= Grassberry River =

River in Saskatchewan, Canada

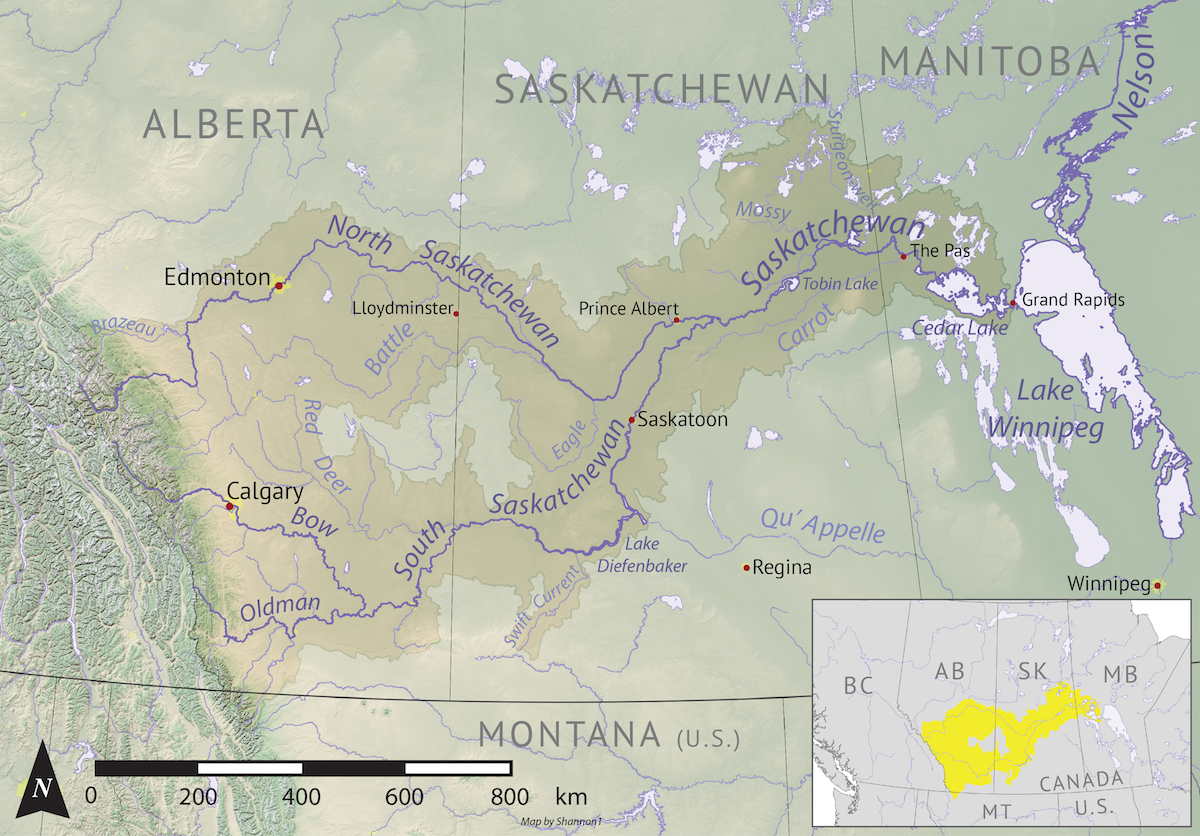
- Saskatchewan River's drainage basin

- Location of the river's mouth in Saskatchewan Grassberry River (Canada)

Location
- Country: Canada
- Province: Saskatchewan

Physical characteristics
- Source: Sarginson Lake
  - location: Northern Saskatchewan Administration District
  - coordinates: 54.6989°N 103.1516°W
- Mouth: Saskatchewan River Delta
  - location: Northern Saskatchewan Administration District
  - coordinates: 54.1209°N 102.8512°W

Basin features
- River system: Saskatchewan River
- Tributaries
  - left: Tulabi Brook; Balsam Brook
- Waterbodies: Limestone Lake; Suggi Lake

Grassberry River is a river in the Canadian province of Saskatchewan. It begins at Sarginson Lake near Deschambault Lake, crosses Highway 106, and flows southward into an arm of the Saskatchewan River in the Saskatchewan River Delta. The Saskatchewan River Delta is the largest inland delta in North America. In the delta, at the river's mouth, are two Indian reserves, Pine Bluff 20A and Pine Bluff 20B.

Lakes along the river's course include Limestone Lake, Hand Lake, Bigstone Lake, Riecke Lake, Acheninni Lake, Suggi Lake, and Windy Lake.

== See also ==
- List of rivers of Saskatchewan
- Hudson Bay drainage basin
