= Namew Lake =

Lake in Saskatchewan and Manitoba, Canada

- Location in Saskatchewan Namew Lake (Canada)
- Location: Northern Saskatchewan; Northern Manitoba
- Coordinates: 54.2367°N 101.9339°W
- Etymology: Indigenous word meaning "Sturgeon"
- Part of: Saskatchewan River drainage basin
- Primary inflows: Sturgeon-Weir River
- Primary outflows: Whitey Channel
- Basin countries: Canada
- Surface area: 19,643 ha (48,540 acres)
- Max. depth: 42.5 m (139 ft)
- Shore length^{1}: 212 km (132 mi)
- Surface elevation: 277 m (909 ft)
- Islands: Kirk Island
- Settlements: Sturgeon Landing
- ^{1} Shore length is not a well-defined measure.

Namew Lake is a large lake along the course of the Sturgeon-Weir River in the Canadian provinces of Saskatchewan and Manitoba. Most of the lake is in Saskatchewan with only the north-eastern corner in Manitoba. The community of Sturgeon Landing, Saskatchewan is on the northern shore at the mouth of the Sturgeon-Weir River. Sturgeon Landing Outfitters is within the community and provides supplies for fishing on the lake. The Namew Lake Mine in Manitoba is situated at the lake's eastern end. Access to the lake is from Namew Lake Road in Manitoba.

Namew is an Indigenous word meaning "Sturgeon".

== Description ==
At 19,643 hectares (48,540 acres) in size and 42.5 metres (139 ft) deep, Namew Lake is a large lake surrounded by boreal forest in Northern Saskatchewan and Northern Manitoba.

The lake is along the course of the Sturgeon-Weir River in the Nelson River drainage basin. The Sturgeon-Weir River, which has its source to the north at Corneille Lake, is a tributary of the Saskatchewan River. The Sturgeon-Weir River enters Namew Lake at the northern end and exits at the southern end via Whitey Narrows and then Cross Lake. Cross Lake connects to Cumberland Lake, which is a lake along the course of the Saskatchewan River in the Saskatchewan River Delta.

== Communities and development ==
Along the northern shore—where the Sturgeon-Weir River flows in—is the community of Sturgeon Landing and Sturgeon Weir 184F Indian reserve of the Peter Ballantyne Cree Nation. Sturgeon Landing Outfitters is an outfitter in Sturgeon Landing that has cabins, a convenience store, and hunting and fishing trips. On the Manitoba side, is Namew Lake Mine. Minerals extracted include copper, gold, silver, platinum, palladium, and zinc.

Access to the lake and its amenities is from Namew Lake Road. Namew Lake Road begins to the east at Manitoba's Highway 10 and provides access to the Manitoba side of the lake. Namew Lake Road ends at the Saskatchewan border where it becomes Saskatchewan's Highway 967. Highway 967 is a 5.3-kilometre (3.3 mi) long highway that runs from the border into Sturgeon Landing.

There are two former airports on the shores of Namew Lake. Sturgeon Landing Airport was located along the Sturgeon-Weir River at the north end of Sturgeon Landing and Namew Lake Airport was located at the western end of the lake.

== Fish species ==
Fish commonly found in Namew Lake include goldeye, northern pike, yellow perch, walleye, cisco, lake whitefish, burbot, white sucker, and longnose sucker.

== See also ==
- List of lakes of Saskatchewan
- List of lakes of Manitoba
