= Yellow Quill 90 =

Indian reserve in Saskatchewan, Canada

Coordinates: 52°21′40″N 103°39′26″W

- Indian reserve
- Yellow Quill Indian Reserve No. 90
- Location in Saskatchewan
- First Nation: Yellow Quill
- Country: Canada
- Province: Saskatchewan

Area
  - Total: 5,858.8 ha (14,477 acres)

Population (2016)
  - Total: 436
  - Density: 7.44/km^{2} (19.3/sq mi)
- Community Well-Being Index: 45

Yellow Quill 90 is an Indian reserve of the Yellow Quill First Nation in Saskatchewan on the eastern shore of Nut Lake. It is about 19 kilometres (12 mi) north-west of Kelvington. In the 2016 Canadian Census, it recorded a population of 436 living in 110 of its 121 total private dwellings. In the same year, its Community Well-Being index was calculated at 45 of 100, compared to 58.4 for the average First Nations community and 77.5 for the average non-Indigenous community.

== See also ==
- List of Indian reserves in Saskatchewan
