= Yellow Quill 90-10 =

Indian reserve in Saskatchewan, Canada

Coordinates: 52°07′31″N 106°39′40″W

- Indian reserve
- Yellow Quill Indian Reserve No. 90-10
- Location in Saskatchewan
- First Nation: Yellow Quill
- Country: Canada
- Province: Saskatchewan

Area
  - Total: 0.2 ha (0.49 acres)

Yellow Quill 90-10 is an Indian reserve of the Yellow Quill First Nation in Saskatchewan.

== See also ==
- List of Indian reserves in Saskatchewan
