= Pisiwiminiwatim 207 =

Indian reserve in Saskatchewan, Canada

Coordinates: 54°43′11″N 103°28′24″W

- Indian reserve
- Pisiwiminiwatim Indian Reserve No. 207
- Location in Saskatchewan
- First Nation: Peter Ballantyne
- Country: Canada
- Province: Saskatchewan

Area
  - Total: 2,876 ha (7,110 acres)

Pisiwiminiwatim 207 is an Indian reserve of the Peter Ballantyne Cree Nation in Saskatchewan. It is about 23 kilometres (14 mi) south of the community of Deschambault Lake on the shores of Deschambault Lake.

== See also ==
- List of Indian reserves in Saskatchewan
