= Nut Lake =

Lake in Saskatchewan, Canada

- Location in Saskatchewan Nut Lake (Canada)
- Location: East-central Saskatchewan
- Coordinates: 52.3667°N 103.7005°W
- Part of: Red Deer River drainage basin
- Primary inflows: Pipestone Creek; Prairie Butte Creek
- River sources: Porcupine Hills
- Primary outflows: Red Deer River
- Basin countries: Canada
- Max. length: 9.5 km (5.9 mi)
- Surface area: 1,810 ha (4,500 acres)
- Shore length^{1}: 76 km (47 mi)
- Surface elevation: 535 m (1,755 ft)
- ^{1} Shore length is not a well-defined measure.

Nut Lake is a lake in the Canadian province of Saskatchewan. It is about 83 kilometres (52 mi) south-east of the city of Melfort and 21 kilometres (13 mi) north of the town of Kelvington in the RMs of Ponass Lake No. 367 and Kelvington No. 366. Reserves of the Yellow Quill First Nation also border the lake. Nut Lake is the source of the Red Deer River.

Access is from Yellow Quill First Nation Road. The road runs from Highway 756 north along the eastern side of the lake to Highway 349.

== Description ==
Nut Lake covers an area of about 1,810 hectares (4,500 acres), is 9.5 kilometres (5.9 mi) long, and has a shoreline that measures 76 kilometres (47 mi). The western shore borders the RM of Ponass Lake No. 367 while the northern and southern tips of the lake touch the boundaries of the RM of Kelvington No. 366. The eastern shore borders Yellow Quill 90 Indian reserve and small parts Yellow Quill 90-9 reserve border the southern end of the lake. The main band office for the Yellow Quill First Nation is at the end of an arm of the lake in the south-east corner.

Nut Lake is the source of the Red Deer River. The river leaves the lake from the northern end and flows generally eastward into the province of Manitoba and Lake Winnipegosis. Nut Lake has two main inflows, Pipestone Creek and Prairie Butte Creek. Pipestone Creek begins to the south-east near Nut Mountain at the south-western slopes of the Porcupine Hills. Prairie Butte Creek begins to the east at Little Nut Lake. Upstream from Little Nut Lake is Round Lake.

== See also ==
- List of lakes of Saskatchewan
