= Yellow Quill 90-11 =

Indian reserve in Saskatchewan, Canada

Coordinates: 52°21′04″N 103°37′14″W

- Indian reserve
- Yellow Quill Indian Reserve No. 90-11
- Location in Saskatchewan
- First Nation: Yellow Quill
- Country: Canada
- Province: Saskatchewan

Area
  - Total: 65.2 ha (161 acres)

Yellow Quill 90-11 is an Indian reserve of the Yellow Quill First Nation in Saskatchewan.

== See also ==
- List of Indian reserves in Saskatchewan
