= Yellow Quill 90-8 =

Indian reserve in Saskatchewan, Canada

Coordinates: 52°23′41″N 103°37′14″W

- Indian reserve
- Yellow Quill Indian Reserve No. 90-8
- Location in Saskatchewan
- First Nation: Yellow Quill
- Country: Canada
- Province: Saskatchewan

Area
  - Total: 64.8 ha (160 acres)

Yellow Quill 90-8 is an Indian reserve of the Yellow Quill First Nation in Saskatchewan. It is about 27 kilometres (17 mi) north of Kelvington.

== See also ==
- List of Indian reserves in Saskatchewan
