= Mistahi Wasahk 209 =

Indian reserve in Saskatchewan, Canada

Coordinates: 56°22′30″N 103°01′58″W

- Indian reserve
- Mistahi Wasahk Indian Reserve No. 209
- Location in Saskatchewan
- First Nation: Peter Ballantyne
- Country: Canada
- Province: Saskatchewan

Area
  - Total: 6,333.4 ha (15,650 acres)

Mistahi Wasahk 209 is an Indian reserve of the Peter Ballantyne Cree Nation in Saskatchewan. It is adjacent to and east of, Southend 200. The reserve sits at the southern end of Reindeer Lake at Deep Bay crater.

== See also ==
- List of Indian reserves in Saskatchewan
