= Southend, Saskatchewan =

Northern settlement in Saskatchewan, Canada

Southend
- Northern settlement
- Southend Reindeer
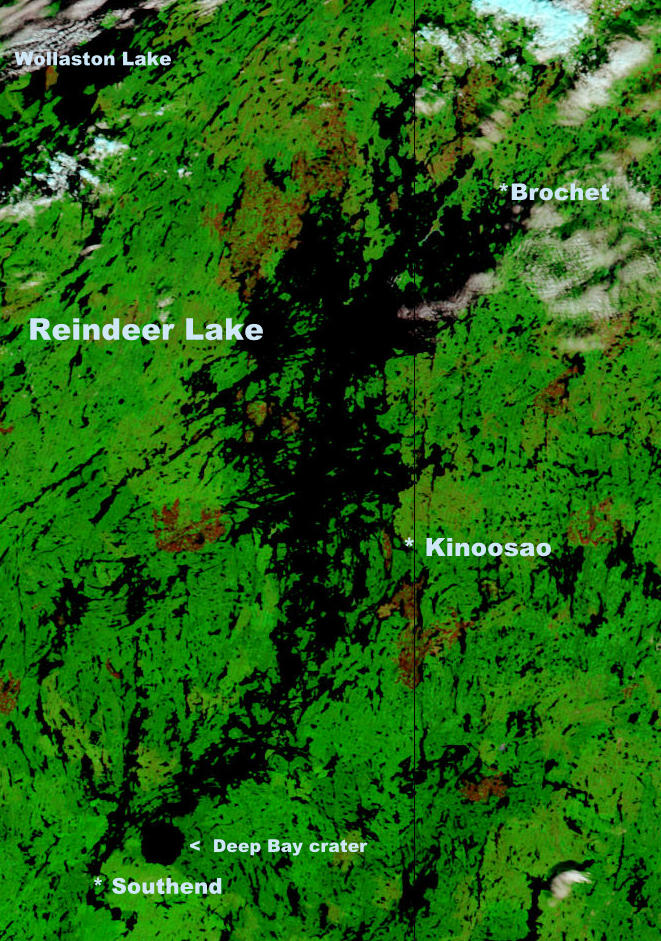
- Location of Southend on a NASA satellite map of Reindeer Lake

- Location within Saskatchewan
- Coordinates: 56.3296°N 103.2426°W
- Country: Canada
- Province: Saskatchewan
- Census division: 18
- Rural municipality: Northern Saskatchewan Administration District

Government
  - Fed. riding: Desnethé—Missinippi—Churchill River
  - Prov. riding: Cumberland
- Time zone: CST
  - Summer (DST): CST
- Postal code: S0J 2L0
- Area codes: 306 and 639
- Highway(s): 102
- Waterway(s): Reindeer Lake

Southend (Woods Cree: ᐚᐹᑎᑯᒋᐘᓄᕽ, romanized: wâpâtikociwanohk) is a community in north-eastern Saskatchewan, Canada. It is situated on Big Island at the southern end of Reindeer Lake — the ninth largest lake in Canada. The community is the terminus of Highway 102 and is about 221 kilometres (137 mi) north-east of La Ronge.

The community consists of the northern settlement of Southend with a population of 35, and Southend 200 and Southend 200A, Indian reserves of the Peter Ballantyne Cree Nation, with a combined population of 1,052 in 2021.

Its economy is dependent on hunting, trapping, and fishing, as well as cultural events and supporting mines in the north.

== History ==
Fur trade posts were established on Reindeer Lake as early as 1792. Reindeer River Post (1792, 1795) at the lake's outlet was a North West Company Post. Reindeer Lake Post (or Clapham House) (1798–1892) on the western shore at Sucker Point, opposite Deep Bay, was a Hudson's Bay Company (HBC) post.

In the early 1900s, the Revillon Frères set up a network of fur-trading posts in Canada, including a post on the southern tip of Reindeer Lake. This post, called South Reindeer Lake, was acquired by the Hudson's Bay Company in 1936. Around 1950, the post was renamed to Southend, to match the name of the community. In 1959, the post became part of the HBC Northern Stores Department. HBC divested this department in 1987 to The North West Company, which still operates a Northern Store in Southend.

In February 1980, two sounding Black Brant 5B rockets were launched from Southend. They reached an altitude of about 156 kilometres (97 mi).

== Transportation ==
- Highway 102
- Southend/Hans Ulricksen Field Aerodrome
- Southend Water Aerodrome

== Media ==
- CBKA-FM

== See also ==
- List of communities in Saskatchewan
