= Wally Dion =

First Nations artist from Canada

- Born: 1976 (age 49–50); Saskatoon, Saskatchewan
- Citizenship: Yellow Quill First Nation and Canadian
- Education: University of Saskatchewan (BFA, 2004)
- Alma mater: Rhode Island School of Design (MFA)
- Website: wallydion.com

Wally Dion (born 1976) is a Canadian artist from the Yellow Quill First Nation who lives in Upstate New York. Many of his works reimagine the form of the quilt through non-traditional materials.

== Early and personal life ==
Wally Dion is a Sauteaux and a member of the Yellow Quill First Nation. He was born in Saskatoon, Saskatchewan in 1976. He grew up in Saskatoon. He attended the University of Saskatchewan, graduating with a BFA in 2004. He later earned an MFA at the Rhode Island School of Design.

== Work ==
Dion's earlier quilts were made from repurposed circuit boards.

Dion's ongoing series Grass Quilts, which began in 2022, involves using transparent and translucent fabric to make quilts, which are meant to be exhibited outdoors in the wind. The first piece in the series was born from an artist residence in Wanuskewin Park. It was originally intended to be a layered piece, with different elements symbolizing prairie grass and the reintroduction of bison; due to time constraints, Dion pivoted instead to a single layer. The series is meant to illustrate how ecosystems are composed of multiple fragile pieces.

Dion has also worked with printmaking, painting, and sculpture.

== Personal ==
Dion is based out of Binghamton, New York.

== Exhibitions ==
=== Solo ===
- skodenstoodis, University of Saskatchewan (May–August 2022)

=== Group ===
- Before and after the Horizon: Anishinaabe Artists of the Great Lakes, National Museum of the American Indian (2013-2014)
- Connective Tissue: New Approaches to Fiber in Contemporary Native Art, IAIA Museum of Contemporary Native Arts (2017)
- The Art of the People: Contemporary Anishinaabe Artists, Muskegon Museum of Art (2020)
- Remai Modern
- Host, Bonavista Biennale (2023)
- un/tangling, un/covering, un/doing, University of the Fraser Valley (2024)
- Stitching the Revolution: Quilts as Agents of Change, Mattatuck Museum (2024)
- Objects USA, R & Company (2024)
- Manual Assembly , The Joan and Martin Goldfarb Gallery of York University (2024)

== Collections ==
Dion's works are held in multiple collections, including:

- Saskatchewan Arts Board ("Star Blanket" (2006))
- Portland Art Museum ("Green Star Quilt" (2019))
