= Sandy Bay, Saskatchewan =

Northern village in Saskatchewan, Canada

Sandy Bay
- Northern village
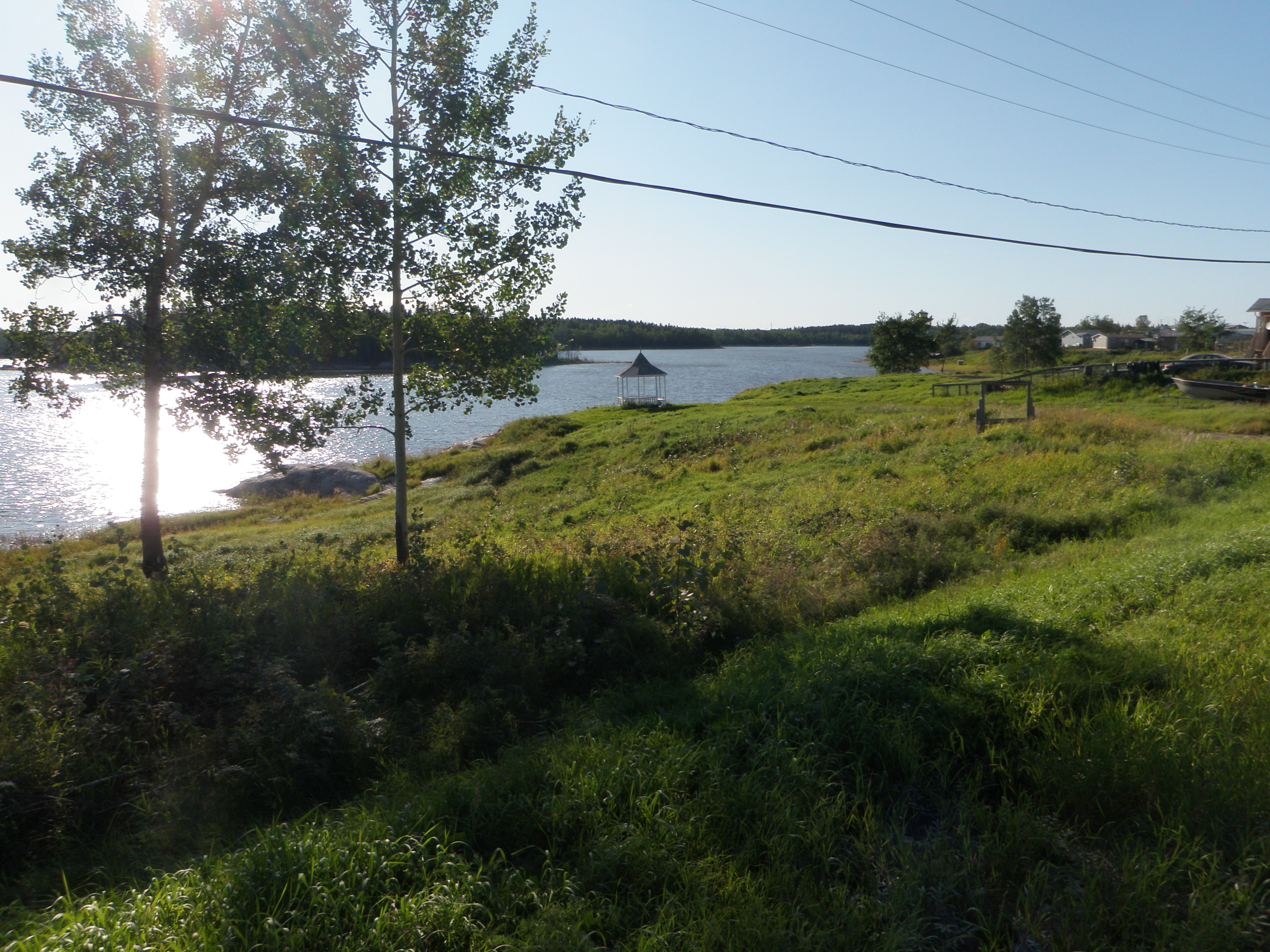
- Main Beach on the Churchill River

- Location of Sandy Bay in Saskatchewan Sandy Bay (Canada)
- Coordinates: 55.315°N 102.186°W
- Country: Canada
- Province: Saskatchewan
- District: Northern Saskatchewan Administration District
- Census division: 18
- Time zone: CST
- Area code: 306

Sandy Bay is a northern village in the boreal forest of northern Saskatchewan, Canada. It is situated on the shore of Wasawakasik Lake — which is a lake along the course of the Churchill River — about 70 kilometres (43 mi) north of the community of Pelican Narrows and 91 kilometres (57 mi) northwest of Creighton and Flin Flon. The community consists of two parts the Northern Village of Sandy Bay and the Wapaskokimaw 202 reserve of the Peter Ballantyne Cree Nation. Access is via Highway 135 and the Hanson Lake Road.

The community has a health clinic, community resource centre, pre-school, K-12 school (Hector Thiboutot School), and a day-care. Sandy Bay has a population of about 1,200, of whom about one quarter are members of the Peter Ballantyne Cree Nation.

== History ==
Sandy Bay grew around the hydroelectric power station that was built in the late 1920s to supply power for the smelters and mines in Flin Flon, Manitoba. The community was initially situated further downstream along the Churchill River, but the residents were encouraged to relocate near the proposed site of the Island Falls Hydroelectric Station to provide a source of labour for its construction. The community then grew as the generating station altered traditional lifestyles. In 1965 Sandy Bay became a Local Community Authority. In 1966 the Island Falls Hydroelectric Station switched to an automatic system and the majority of jobs were lost. An all-weather road was built into the community in 1967 and other services followed. In the 1980s Sandy Bay was designated as a northern village.

The dam is presently operated by SaskPower and is now totally automated. Tourism is now the major industry in the area. There is a local store in the community, but other supplies and groceries can be purchased in Flin Flon, two hours by highway.

== Demographics ==
In the 2021 Census of Population conducted by Statistics Canada, Sandy Bay had a population of 671 living in 161 of its 214 total private dwellings, a change of 17.3% from its 2016 population of 572. With a land area of 11.42 km^{2} (4.41 sq mi), it had a population density of 58.8/km^{2} (152.2/sq mi) in 2021.

Canada census – Sandy Bay, Saskatchewan community profile

	2011
Population	1,233 (+4.9% from 2006)
Land area	14.85 km^{2} (5.73 sq mi)
Population density	83.0/km^{2} (215/sq mi)
Median age	17.4 (M: 15.9, F: 18.7)
Private dwellings	256 (total)
Median household income	$20,512 (Single Parent)

References: 2011

== Climate ==
Sandy Bay (Island Falls Station)

Climate chart (precipitation, max. and min. temperature)
J	F	M	A	M	J	J	A	S	O	N	D
17 −16 −25	15 −11 −20	18 −3 −14	23 7 −4	44 16 4	72 21 10	75 24 13	62 22 12	57 14 6	35 6 0	21 −5 −11	24 −14 −21
- █ Average max. and min. temperatures in °C
- █ Precipitation totals in mm
- Source: The Weather Network
Imperial conversion
J	F	M	A	M	J	J	A	S	O	N	D
0.7 3 −12	0.6 13 −4	0.7 28 8	0.9 45 25	1.7 60 39	2.8 70 51	3 75 56	2.4 72 54	2.2 58 43	1.4 44 31	0.8 23 12	0.9 7 −6
- █ Average max. and min. temperatures in °F
- █ Precipitation totals in inches

Sandy Bay has warm summers and cold winters. The average daytime high does not exceed 25 °C, but it is common to have heat waves where the temperature will reach 30 °C to 35 °C. In the winter the average daytime low does not dip below - 25 °C, but is it common to get cold fronts that bring the air temperature to -40 °C.

The majority of the precipitation occurs during the summer months, mainly June and July. The average annual precipitation is 460mm. During the summer months it is common for the rain to fall in large amounts during short periods of time. Lightning and Thunder Storms are almost a daily occurrence in the summer evenings. With heavy amounts of rain, the lakes, rivers and streams fill up fast and can cause problems.

In the summer of 2011 the Sandy Bay and Pelican Narrows region received a large amount of rain over a three-day period. The rivers overflowed and the main road was washed out in several places. The roads were impassable. The communities were cut off from regular services and no one could leave. The Hansen Lake Road, Highway 106, was washed out and became impassable. The provincial Ministry of Transportation worked around the clock to fix the roads and had them open within a few days.

The hottest day on record was on July 21, 1929 when the daytime high reached 40 °C. The coldest day on record was on January 15, 1930 when the daytime low reached -46.1 °C. The most rain, in a single day, was on August 22, 1936 when 77mm of rain fell. The day with the most snow was on November 28, 1973 when 28 cm of snow fell.

== Sandy Bay Memorial Beach ==
The Sandy Bay Memorial Beach is a community based project in memory of the children who have drowned in the Churchill River. In the summer of 2011 the community came together and decided to build a safe recreational area where the children can swim. The beach provides a controlled swimming environment and some of the safety features are floating docks, buoys, and an emergency access ramp which are not common in Aboriginal northern communities. The community is planning on having lifeguards working in the summer months and it will be the perfect spot for the whole family to swim. This project has created new jobs for the community and gives youth work experience. The Hector Thiboutot School joined the project to teach the students about water safety and about playing near frozen rivers/lakes in the winter.

== See also ==
- List of communities in Saskatchewan
- List of villages in Saskatchewan
- List of Indian reserves in Saskatchewan
