= Zagime Anishinabek =

First Nation in Saskatchewan, Canada

- Band No. 364
- People: Saulteaux
- Treaty: Treaty 4
- Headquarters: Grenfell
- Province: Saskatchewan

Land
- Main reserve: Sakimay 74
- Reserves: Shesheep 74A; Little Bone 74B; Minoahchak 74C; Sakimay 74-1; Sakimay 74-2; Sakimay 74-3; Sakimay 74-4; Sakimay 74-5; Sakimay 74-6; Sakimay 74-7; Sakimay 74-9; Sakimay 74-10; Sakimay 74-11; Sakimay 74-12; Sakimay 74-14; Sakimay 74-16; Sakimay 74-17
- Land area: 129.013 km^{2} (49.812 sq mi)

Population (2019)
- On reserve: 281
- Off reserve: 1502
- Total population: 1783

Government
- Chief: Lynn Acoose

Tribal Council
- Yorkton Tribal Administration

The Zagime Anishinabek (formerly known as the Sakimay First Nation) are a Saulteaux band government in southern Saskatchewan, Canada. In September 2016, they became a signatory of the Buffalo Treaty.

Their reserves include:

- Little Bone 74B
- Minoahchak 74C
- Sakimay 74
- Sakimay 74-1
- Sakimay 74-2
- Sakimay 74-3
- Sakimay 74-4
- Sakimay 74-5
- Sakimay 74-6
- Sakimay 74-7
- Sakimay 74-9
- Sakimay 74-10
- Sakimay 74-11
- Sakimay 74-12
- Sakimay 74-14
- Sakimay 74-16
- Sakimay 74-17
- Shesheep 74A
- Treaty Four Reserve Grounds 77, shared with 32 other bands.

== Chief and council ==
Chief: Lynn Acoose

Councillors:

- Paula Acoose
- Tamara Peepeetch
- Sarah Rain
- Dennis Peepeetch
- Amber Sangwais
- Huey Acoose
- Randall Sparvier

== See also ==
- List of Indian reserves in Saskatchewan
