= Yellow Quill 90-9 =

Indian reserve in Saskatchewan, Canada

Coordinates: 52°17′16″N 103°40′40″W

- Indian reserve
- Yellow Quill Indian Reserve No. 90-9
- Location in Saskatchewan
- First Nation: Yellow Quill
- Country: Canada
- Province: Saskatchewan

Area
  - Total: 7,082.7 ha (17,502 acres)

Population (2016)
  - Total: 50
  - Density: 0.71/km^{2} (1.8/sq mi)

Yellow Quill 90-9 is an Indian reserve of the Yellow Quill First Nation in Saskatchewan, Canada. Part of the reserve is on the shores of Nut Lake. In the 2016 Canadian Census, it recorded a population of 50 living in 14 of its 15 total private dwellings.

== See also ==
- List of Indian reserves in Saskatchewan
