= Chief Joseph Custer Reserve =

Indian reserve in Saskatchewan, Canada

Coordinates: 53°11′30″N 105°46′38″W

- Indian reserve
- Chief Joseph Custer Indian Reserve
- Location in Saskatchewan
- First Nation: Peter Ballantyne
- Country: Canada
- Province: Saskatchewan

Area
  - Total: 23 ha (57 acres)

The Chief Joseph Custer Reserve is an Indian reserve of the Peter Ballantyne Cree Nation in Saskatchewan. It is located in the city of Prince Albert, making it an urban reserve.

== See also ==
- List of Indian reserves in Saskatchewan
