= Limestone Lake (Saskatchewan) =

Lake in Saskatchewan, Canada

- Location in Saskatchewan Limestone Lake (Canada)
- Location: Northern Administration District, Saskatchewan
- Coordinates: 54.6334°N 103.2171°W
- Part of: Saskatchewan River drainage basin
- Primary inflows: Grassberry River
- Primary outflows: Grassberry River
- Basin countries: Canada
- Surface area: 3,645 ha (9,010 acres)
- Max. depth: 6 m (20 ft)
- Shore length^{1}: 68 km (42 mi)
- Surface elevation: 321 m (1,053 ft)
- Settlements: None
- ^{1} Shore length is not a well-defined measure.

Limestone Lake is a lake in the Canadian province of Saskatchewan. It is in the Northern Saskatchewan Administration District and access is from Highway 106. The lake is at the northern limit of the Mid-boreal Lowland ecoregion within the Saskatchewan River watershed. Limestone Lake is along the course of Grassberry River, which flows south into Saskatchewan River Delta. Grassberry Creek flows into the southern end of Limestone Lake.

== Limestone Lake Recreation Site ==
Limestone Lake Recreation Site (54.6807°N 103.1888°W) is a provincial recreation site at the northern end of Limestone Lake. There is free camping, a boat launch, and boat rentals. The site is associated with Northern Lights Lodge, which leases the nearby Deschambault Lake (South East Arm) Recreation Site.

== Fish species ==
Fish commonly found in Limestone Lake include burbot, cisco, lake whitefish, northern pike, walleye, white sucker, and yellow perch.

== See also ==
- List of lakes of Saskatchewan
- Tourism in Saskatchewan
