= Waskwaynikapik 228 =

Indian reserve in Saskatchewan, Canada

Coordinates: 54°50′38″N 102°36′00″W

- Indian reserve
- Waskwaynikapik Indian Reserve No. 228
- Location in Saskatchewan
- First Nation: Peter Ballantyne
- Country: Canada
- Province: Saskatchewan

Area
  - Total: 1,381.8 ha (3,415 acres)

Waskwaynikapik 228 is an Indian reserve of the Peter Ballantyne Cree Nation in Saskatchewan. It is along the course of the Sturgeon-Weir River and access is from Highway 106.

== See also ==
- List of Indian reserves in Saskatchewan
