= List of Indian reserves in Saskatchewan =

The following is the List of Indian reserves in Saskatchewan, Canada. There are over 700 Indian reserves in Saskatchewan.

== A ==
- Ahtahkakoop 104
- Amisk Lake 184
- Amiskosakahikan 210
- Asimakaniseekan Askiy 102A
- Asimakaniseekan Askiy 102B
- Assiniboine 76
- Atim Ka-mihkosit Reserve

== B ==
- Barkwell Bay 192I
- Beardy's 97 and Okemasis 96
- Beardy's & Okemasis' 96 & 97-A
- Beardy's & Okemasis' 96 & 97-B
- Beardy's & Okemasis' 96 & 97-C
- Beauval Forks 192O
- Big Island Lake Cree Territory
- Big River 118
- Big River 118A
- Birch Portage 184A
- Bittern Lake 218
- Budd's Point 20D
- Buffalo River Dene Nation 193

== C ==
- Cable Bay 192M
- Cable Bay 192N
- Canoe Lake 165
- Canoe Lake 165A
- Canoe Lake 165B
- Carrot River 29A
- Carry the Kettle 76-1
- Carry the Kettle 76-2
- Carry the Kettle 76-3
- Carry the Kettle 76-4
- Carry the Kettle 76-5
- Carry the Kettle 76-6
- Carry the Kettle 76-7
- Carry the Kettle 76-8
- Carry the Kettle 76-9
- Carry the Kettle 76-10
- Carry the Kettle 76-11
- Carry the Kettle 76-12
- Carry the Kettle 76-13
- Carry the Kettle 76-14
- Carry the Kettle 76-15
- Carry the Kettle 76-17
- Carry the Kettle 76-18
- Carry the Kettle 76-19
- Carry the Kettle 76-20
- Carry the Kettle 76-21
- Carry the Kettle 76-22
- Carry the Kettle 76-23
- Carry the Kettle 76-24
- Carry the Kettle 76-25
- Carry the Kettle 76-28
- Carry the Kettle 76-29
- Carry the Kettle 76-30
- Carry the Kettle 76-31
- Carry the Kettle 76-32
- Carry the Kettle 76-33
- Carry the Kettle 76-34
- Carry the Kettle 76-35
- Carry the Kettle 76-36
- Carry the Kettle 76-37
- Carry the Kettle 76-38
- Carry the Kettle 76-40
- Carry the Kettle 76-41
- Carry the Kettle 76-42
- Carry the Kettle 76-43
- Carry the Kettle 76-44
- Carry the Kettle 76-45
- Carry the Kettle 76-46
- Carry the Kettle 76-47
- Carry the Kettle 76-48
- Carry the Kettle 76-49
- Carry the Kettle 76-50
- Carry the Kettle 76-51
- Carry the Kettle 76-52
- Carry the Kettle 76-53
- Carry the Kettle 76-54
- Carry the Kettle 76-55
- Carry the Kettle 76-56
- Carry the Kettle 76-57
- Carry the Kettle 76-58
- Carry the Kettle 76-59
- Carry the Kettle 76-60
- Carry the Kettle 76-61
- Carry the Kettle 76-62
- Carry the Kettle 76-63
- Carry the Kettle 76-64
- Carry the Kettle 76-65
- Carry the Kettle 76-66
- Carry the Kettle 76-67
- Carry the Kettle 76-69
- Carry the Kettle 76-70
- Carry the Kettle 76-71
- Carry the Kettle 76-72
- Carry the Kettle 76-73
- Carry the Kettle 76-74
- Carry the Kettle 76-75
- Carry the Kettle 76-76
- Carry the Kettle 76-77
- Carry the Kettle 76-78
- Carry the Kettle 76-79
- Carry the Kettle 76-80
- Carry the Kettle 76-81
- Carry the Kettle 76-82
- Carry the Kettle 76-84
- Carry the Kettle 76-86
- Carry the Kettle 76-87
- Carry the Kettle 76-88
- Carry the Kettle 76-89
- Carry the Kettle 76-91
- Carry the Kettle 76-110
- Chicken 224
- Chicken 225
- Chicken 226
- Chief Joseph Custer Reserve
- Chief Philip Morin 232
- Chitek Lake 191
- Churchill Lake 193A
- Clearwater River Dene 221
- Clearwater River Dene 222
- Clearwater River Dene 223
- Cote 64
- Cowessess 73
- Cowessess 73A
- Cree Lake 192G
- Cumberland House Cree Nation 20
- Cumberland 100A

== D ==
- Day Star 87
- Denare Beach Indian Settlement
- Deschambault Lake Indian Settlement
- Dipper Rapids 192C

== E ==
- Eagles Lake 165C
- Elak Dase 192A
- English River 192H

== F ==
- Fishing Lake 89
- Fishing Lake 89A
- Fishing Lake 89D1
- Flatstone Lake 192L
- Flying Dust 105
- Flying Dust 105D
- Flying Dust 105E
- Flying Dust 105F
- Flying Dust 105H
- Flying Dust 105I
- Flying Dust 105J
- Flying Dust 105L
- Flying Dust 105O
- Fond du Lac 227
- Fond du Lac 228
- Fond du Lac 229
- Fond du Lac 231
- Fond du Lac 232
- Fond du Lac 233
- Four Portages 157C
- Fox Point 157D
- Fox Point 157E

== G ==
- George Gordon First Nation 86
- George Gordon First Nation 86-3
- George Gordon First Nation 86-4
- George Gordon First Nation 86-5
- Gordon 86
- Gladue Lake 105B
- Gold Eagle Reserve
- Grandmother's Bay 219
- Grasswoods 192J
- Grizzly Bear's Head 110 & Lean Man 111

== H ==
- Haultain Lake 192K
- Haylands 75A

== I ==
- Île-à-la-Crosse 192E

== J ==
- James Smith 100

== K ==
- Kahkewistahaw 72
- Kahkewistahaw 72A-1
- Kahkewistahaw 72A-2
- Kahkewistahaw 72B
- Kahkewistahaw 72C
- Kahkewistahaw 72D
- Kahkewistahaw 72E
- Kahkewistahaw 72F
- Kahkewistahaw 72G
- Kahkewistahaw 72H
- Kahkewistahaw 72I
- Kahkewistahaw 72J
- Kahkewistahaw 72K
- Kahkewistahaw 72L
- Kahkewistahaw 72M
- Kahkewistahaw 72P
- Kahkewistahaw 72Q
- Kahkewistahaw 72W
- Kahkewistahaw 72X
- Kawacatoose 88
- Keeseekoose 66
- Keeseekoose 66-CA-01
- Keeseekoose 66-CA-02
- Keeseekoose 66-CA-03
- Keeseekoose 66-CA-04
- Keeseekoose 66-CA-05
- Keeseekoose 66-CA-06
- Keeseekoose 66-CA-08
- Keeseekoose 66-CH-01
- Keeseekoose 66-CH-03
- Keeseekoose 66-CH-04
- Keeseekoose 66-CO-01
- Keeseekoose 66-CO-02
- Keeseekoose 66-KE-01
- Keeseekoose 66-KE-02
- Keeseekoose 66-KE-03
- Keeseekoose 66-KE-04
- Keeseekoose 66-KE-05
- Keeseekoose 66-KE-06
- Keeseekoose 66-SA-01
- Keeseekoose 66-SA-02
- Keeseekoose 66-ST-01
- Keeseekoose 66-ST-02
- Keeseekoose 66-ST-03
- Keeseekoose 66-ST-04
- Kimosom Pwatinahk 203
- Kinistin Pwatinahk 203
- Kinistin 91
- Kinistin 91A
- Kinoosao-Thomas Clarke 204
- Kipahigan Sakahikan 222
- Kiskaciwan 208
- Kiskinwuhumatowin
- Kistapinan 211
- Kistapinânihk 231
- Kitsakie 156B
- Knee Lake 192B

== L ==
- La Plonge 192
- Lac la Hache 220
- Last Mountain Lake 80A
- Lake Pitihkwakew 102B
- Leaf Rapids 192P
- Little Black Bear 84
- Little Black Bear 84SC
- Little Bone 74B
- Little Hills 158
- Little Hills 158A
- Little Hills 158B
- Little Pine 116
- Little Red River 106C
- Little Red River 106D
- Lucky Man Reserve

== M ==
- Makaoo 120
- Makwa Lake 129
- Makwa Lake 129A
- Makwa Lake 129B
- Makwa Lake 129C
- Manawanstawayak 230
- Maskikopawiscikosik 229
- Mawdsley Lake 192R
- McKay 209
- Meadow Lake 105A
- Meadow Lake 105C
- Min-a-he-quo-sis 116A
- Min-a-he-quo-sis 116C
- Ministikwan 161
- Ministikwan 161A
- Minoahchak 74C
- Mirond Lake 184E
- Mistahi Wasahk 209
- Mistik Reserve
- Mistawasis 103
- Mistawasis 103A
- Mistawasis 103B
- Mistawasis 103C
- Mistawasis 103D
- Mistawasis 103E
- Mistawasis 103F
- Mistawasis 103G
- Mistawasis 103H
- Mistawasis 103I
- Mistawasis 103J
- Mistawasis 103L
- Montreal Lake 106
- Montreal Lake 106B
- Moosomin 112A
- Moosomin 112B
- Moosomin 112E
- Moosomin 112F
- Moosomin 112G
- Moosomin 112H
- Moosomin 112J
- Moosomin 112K
- Moosomin 112L
- Moosomin 112M
- Moosomin 112N
- Moosomin 112P
- Moosomin 112S
- Morin Lake 217
- Mosquito 109
- Mosquito-Grizzly Bear's Head-Lean Man
- Muscowpetung 80
- Muskeg Lake 102
- Muskeg Lake 102B
- Muskeg Lake 102C
- Muskeg Lake 102D
- Muskeg Lake 102E
- Muskeg Lake 102F
- Muskeg Lake 102G
- Muskeg Lake 102H
- Muskeg Lake 102J
- Muskeg Lake 102K
- Muskeg Lake 102L
- Muskeg Lake 102M
- Muskoday Reserve
- Muskoday 99A
- Muskoday 99B
- Muskowekwan 85
- Muskowekwan 85A
- Muskowekwan 85-1
- Muskowekwan 85-2
- Muskowekwan 85-2A
- Muskowekwan 85-3
- Muskowekwan 85-4
- Muskowekwan 85-6
- Muskowekwan 85-7
- Muskowekwan 85-8
- Muskowekwan 85-9
- Muskowekwan 85-10
- Muskowekwan 85-11
- Muskowekwan 85-12
- Muskowekwan 85-13
- Muskowekwan 85-14
- Muskowekwan 85-15
- Muskowekwan 85-16
- Muskowekwan 85-17
- Muskowekwan 85-18
- Muskowekwan 85-19
- Muskowekwan 85-20
- Muskowekwan 85-21
- Muskowekwan 85-22
- Muskowekwan 85-23
- Muskowekwan 85-24
- Muskowekwan 85-25
- Muskowekwan 85-26
- Muskowekwan 85-27
- Muskowekwan 85-28
- Muskowekwan 85-29
- Muskowekwan 85-30
- Muskowekwan 85-31
- Muskowekwan 85-32
- Muskowekwan 85-33
- Muskowekwan 85-34
- Muskowekwan 85-35
- Muskowekwan 85-36
- Muskowekwan 85-37
- Muskowekwan 85-38
- Muskowekwan 85-39
- Muskowekwan 85-40
- Muskowekwan 85-41
- Muskowekwan 85-42
- Muskowekwan 85-43
- Muskowekwan 85-44
- Muskowekwan 85-45
- Muskowekwan 85-46
- Muskowekwan 85-47
- Muskowekwan 85-48
- Muskowekwan 85-49
- Muskowekwan 85-50
- Muskowekwan 85-51
- Muskowekwan 85-52
- Muskowekwan 85-53
- Muskowekwan 85-54
- Muskowekwan 85-55
- Muskowekwan 85-56
- Muskowekwan 85-57
- Muskowekwan 85-58
- Muskowekwan 85-59
- Muskowekwan 85-60
- Muskowekwan 85-61
- Muskowekwan 85-62
- Muskowekwan 85-63
- Muskowekwan 85-64
- Muskowekwan 85-65
- Muskowekwan 85-66
- Muskowekwan 85-67
- Muskowekwan 85-68
- Muskowekwan 85-69
- Muskowekwan 85-70
- Muskowekwan 85-71
- Muskowekwan 85-72
- Muskowekwan 85-73
- Muskowekwan 85-74
- Muskwaminiwatim 225

== N ==
- Nakaway Ahkeeng Reserve
- Nakiskatowaneek 227
- Nekaneet Cree Nation
- Nemekus Sakahikan 221
- Northern Lights 220

== O ==
- Ocean Man 69
- Ocean Man 69A
- Ocean Man 69B
- Ocean Man 69C
- Ocean Man 69D
- Ocean Man 69E
- Ocean Man 69F
- Ocean Man 69G
- Ocean Man 69H
- Ocean Man 69I
- Ocean Man 69N
- Ocean Man 69S
- Ocean Man 69U
- Ocean Man 69X
- Ochapowace 71-1
- Ochapowace 71-2
- Ochapowace 71-3
- Ochapowace 71-4
- Ochapowace 71-5
- Ochapowace 71-6
- Ochapowace 71-7
- Ochapowace 71-8
- Ochapowace 71-9
- Ochapowace 71-10
- Ochapowace 71-11
- Ochapowace 71-12
- Ochapowace 71-13
- Ochapowace 71-14
- Ochapowace 71-15
- Ochapowace 71-16
- Ochapowace 71-17
- Ochapowace 71-18
- Ochapowace 71-19
- Ochapowace 71-20
- Ochapowace 71-21
- Ochapowace 71-22
- Ochapowace 71-23
- Ochapowace 71-24
- Ochapowace 71-25
- Ochapowace 71-26
- Ochapowace 71-27
- Ochapowace 71-28
- Ochapowace 71-29
- Ochapowace 71-30
- Ochapowace 71-31
- Ochapowace 71-32
- Ochapowace 71-33
- Ochapowace 71-34
- Ochapowace 71-35
- Ochapowace 71-36
- Ochapowace 71-37
- Ochapowace 71-38
- Ochapowace 71-39
- Ochapowace 71-40
- Ochapowace 71-41
- Ochapowace 71-42
- Ochapowace 71-43
- Ochapowace 71-44
- Ochapowace 71-45
- Ochapowace 71-46
- Ochapowace 71-47
- Ochapowace 71-48
- Ochapowace 71-49
- Ochapowace 71-50
- Ochapowace 71-51
- Ochapowace 71-52
- Ochapowace 71-53
- Ochapowace 71-54
- Ochapowace 71-55
- Ochapowace 71-56
- Ochapowace 71-57
- Ochapowace 71-59
- Ochapowace 71-60
- Ochapowace 71-61
- Ochapowace 71-62
- Ochapowace 71-63
- Ochapowace 71-64
- Ochapowace 71-65
- Ochapowace 71-66
- Ochapowace 71-67
- Ochapowace 71-68
- Ochapowace 71-69
- Ochapowace 71-70
- Ochapowace 71-71
- Ochapowace 71-72
- Ochapowace 71-73
- Ochapowace 71-74
- Ochapowace 71-75
- Ochapowace 71-76
- Ochapowace 71-77
- Ochapowace 71-78
- Ochapowace 71-79
- Ochapowace 71-80
- Ochapowace 71-82
- Ochapowace 71-83
- Ochapowace 71-84
- Ochapowace 71-86
- Ochapowace 71-87
- Ochapowace 71-88
- Ochapowace 71-89
- Ochapowace 71-91
- Ochapowace 71-92
- Ochapowace 71-93
- Ochapowace 71-94
- Ochapowace 71-95
- Ochapowace 71-96
- Ochapowace 71-97
- Ochapowace 71-98
- Ochapowace 71-99
- Ochapowace 71-100
- Ochapowace 71-101
- Ochapowace 71-102
- Ochapowace 71-103
- Ochapowace 71-104
- Ochapowace 71-105
- Ochapowace 71-106
- Ochapowace 71-107
- Ochapowace 71-108
- Ochapowace 71-109
- Ochapowace 71-110
- Ochapowace 71-112
- Ochapowace 71-115
- Ochapowace 71-116
- Ochapowace 71-117
- Ochapowace 71-118
- Ochapowace 71-119
- Ochapowace 71-120
- Ochapowace 71-121
- Ochapowace 71-122
- Ochapowace 71-123
- Ochapowace 71-124
- Ochapowace 71-125
- Ochapowace 71-126
- Ochapowace 71-127
- Ochapowace 71-129
- Ochapowace 71-130
- Ochapowace 71-131
- Ochapowace 71-132
- Okanese 82
- Okanese 82A
- Okanese 82B
- Okanese 82C
- Okanese 82D
- Okanese 82E
- Okanese 82F
- Okanese 82G
- Okanese 82H
- Okanese 82I
- Okanese 82J
- Okanese 82K
- Okanese 82L
- Okanese 82M
- Okanese 82N
- Okanese 82O
- Okanese 82P
- Okanese 82Q
- Okanese 82R
- Okanese 82S
- Okanese 82T
- Okanese 82U
- Okanese 82V
- Okanese 82W
- Okanese 82X
- Okanese 82Y
- Okanese 82Z
- Okanese 82AA
- Okanese 82BB
- Okanese 82CC
- Okanese 82DD
- Okanese 82EE
- Okanese 82FF
- Okanese 82GG
- Okanese 82HH
- Old Fort 157B
- One Arrow 95
- One Arrow 95-1A
- One Arrow 95-1B
- One Arrow 95-1C
- One Arrow 95-1D
- One Arrow 95-1E
- One Arrow 95-1F
- One Arrow 95-1G
- One Arrow 95-1H
- One Arrow 95-1I
- One Arrow 95-1J
- Onion Lake 119-1
- Onion Lake 119-2

== P ==
- Pasqua 79
- Peepeekisis 81
- Pelican Lake 191A
- Pelican Lake 191B
- Pelican Lake 191C
- Pelican Lake 191D
- Pelican Narrows 184B
- Pelican Narrows 206
- Peter Ballantyne Cree Nation
- Pheasant Rump 68
- Pheasant Rump 68A
- Pheasant Rump 68B
- Pheasant Rump 68C
- Pheasant Rump 68D
- Pheasant Rump 68E
- Pheasant Rump 68F
- Pheasant Rump 68H
- Piapot 75
- Piapot 75E
- Piapot 75F
- Piapot 75G
- Piapot 75H
- Piapot 75I
- Piapot 75J
- Piapot 75K
- Piapot 75T
- Piapot Urban Reserve
- Pine Bluff 20A
- Pine Bluff 20B
- Pinehouse Lake Indian Settlement
- Pisiwiminiwatim 207
- Poorman 88
- Potato River 156A
- Poundmaker 114
- Poundmaker 114-1A
- Poundmaker 114-2A
- Poundmaker 114-2B
- Poundmaker 114-2C
- Poundmaker 114-3A
- Poundmaker 114-3B
- Poundmaker 114-4A
- Poundmaker 114-5A
- Poundmaker 114-5B
- Poundmaker 114-6A2
- Poundmaker 114-6A3
- Poundmaker 114-6B2
- Poundmaker 114-6C2
- Poundmaker 114-7A
- Poundmaker 114-8A
- Poundmaker 114-9
- Poundmaker 114-9A
- Poundmaker 114-10A
- Poundmaker 114-11A
- Poundmaker 114-12
- Poundmaker 114-13
- Poundmaker 114-15
- Poundmaker 114-15C
- Poundmaker 114-16
- Poundmaker 114-17
- Poundmaker 114-17A
- Poundmaker 114-18A
- Poundmaker 114-18B
- Poundmaker 114-19
- Poundmaker 114-21
- Poundmaker 114-22
- Poundmaker 114-28
- Poundmaker 114-29
- Primeau Lake 192F

== R ==
- Red Earth 29
- Red Pheasant 108
- Roadside 165F

== S ==
- Sabitawasis Beach 89 C-1
- Sakimay 74
- Sakimay 74A
- Sakimay 74B
- Sakimay 74C
- Sakimay 74-1
- Sakimay 74-2
- Sakimay 74-3
- Sakimay 74-4
- Sakimay 74-5
- Sakimay 74-6
- Sakimay 74-7
- Sakimay 74-9
- Sakimay 74-10
- Sakimay 74-11
- Sakimay 74-12
- Sakimay 74-14
- Sakimay 74-16
- Sakimay 74-17
- Sandy Bay Indian Settlement
- Sandy Narrows 184C
- Saulteaux 159
- Saulteaux 159A
- Saulteaux 159B
- Saulteaux 159C
- Saulteaux 159D
- Saulteaux 159E
- Saulteaux 159F
- Saulteaux 159G
- Saulteaux 159H
- Saulteaux 159I
- Saulteaux 159J
- Saulteaux 159L
- Saulteaux 159M
- Saulteaux 159N
- Saulteaux 159O
- Saulteaux 159P
- Saulteaux 159Q
- Saulteaux 159R
- Saulteaux 159S
- Saulteaux 159T
- Saulteaux 159U
- Saulteaux 159V
- Saulteaux 159W
- Saulteaux 159X
- Saulteaux 159Y
- Saulteaux 159Z
- Saulteaux 159AA
- Saulteaux 159BB
- Saulteaux 159CC
- Saulteaux 159DD
- Saulteaux 159EE
- Saulteaux 159FF
- Saulteaux 159GG
- Saulteaux 159HH
- Saulteaux 159II
- Saulteaux 159JJ
- Saulteaux 159KK
- Saulteaux 159LL
- Saulteaux 159MM
- Saulteaux 159NN
- Seekaskootch 119
- Shesheep 74A
- Shoal Lake 28A
- Slush Lake 192Q
- Sokatisewin Sakahikan 224
- Sounding Sky Reserve
- Southend 200
- Southend 200A
- Standing Buffalo 78
- Stanley 157
- Stanley 157A
- Star Blanket 83
- Star Blanket 83B
- Star Blanket 83C
- Star Blanket 83D
- Star Blanket 83E
- Star Blanket 83F
- Star Blanket 83G
- Star Blanket 83H
- Star Blanket 83I
- Star Blanket 83J
- Star Blanket 83K
- Star Blanket 83L
- Sturgeon Lake 101
- Sturgeon Lake 101A
- Sturgeon Lake 101B
- Sturgeon Lake 101C
- Sturgeon Lake 101D
- Sturgeon Lake 101E
- Sturgeon Lake 101J
- Sturgeon Weir 184F
- Sturgeon Weir 205
- Sucker River 156C
- Sweetgrass 113
- Sweetgrass 113A
- Sweetgrass 113B
- Sweetgrass 113-C7
- Sweetgrass 113-C19
- Sweetgrass 113-D12
- Sweetgrass 113-E22
- Sweetgrass 113-F16
- Sweetgrass 113-G7
- Sweetgrass 113-H1
- Sweetgrass 113-I4
- Sweetgrass 113-J3
- Sweetgrass 113-K32
- Sweetgrass 113-L6
- Sweetgrass 113-M16
- Sweetgrass 113-N27
- Sweetgrass 113-O28
- Sweetgrass 113-P2
- Sweetgrass 113-S6

== T ==
- Thomas Morin Reserve
- The Key 65
- Thunderchild First Nation 115B
- Thunderchild First Nation 115C
- Thunderchild First Nation 115D
- Thunderchild First Nation 115E
- Thunderchild First Nation 115F
- Thunderchild First Nation 115G
- Thunderchild First Nation 115H
- Thunderchild First Nation 115I
- Thunderchild First Nation 115J
- Thunderchild First Nation 115K
- Thunderchild First Nation 115L
- Thunderchild First Nation 115M
- Thunderchild First Nation 115N
- Thunderchild First Nation 115Q
- Thunderchild First Nation 115R
- Thunderchild First Nation 115S
- Thunderchild First Nation 115T
- Thunderchild First Nation 115U
- Thunderchild First Nation 115V
- Thunderchild First Nation 115W
- Thunderchild First Nation 115X
- Thunderchild First Nation 115Z
- Tipamahto Aski 95A
- Treaty Four Reserve Grounds 77
- Turnor Lake 193A
- Turnor Lake 193B
- Turnor Lake 194

== W ==
- Wahpaton 94A
- Wahpaton 94B
- Wapachewunak 192D
- Wapaskokimaw 202
- Waskwaynikapik 228
- Waskwiatik Sakahikan 223
- Waterhen 130
- Wa-pii-moos-toosis 83A
- Wepuskow Sahgaiechan 165D
- White Bear 70
- Whitecap 94
- Willow Cree Reserve
- Witchekan Lake 117
- Witchekan Lake 117D
- Wood Mountain 160
- Woody Lake 184D

== Y ==
- Yellow Quill 90
- Yellow Quill 90-8
- Yellow Quill 90-9
- Yellow Quill 90-10
- Yellow Quill 90-11
- Yellow Quill 90-18

== See also ==
- List of rural municipalities in Saskatchewan
- List of communities in Saskatchewan
- List of Indian reserves in Canada
