= Witchekan Lake 117 =

Indian reserve in Saskatchewan, Canada

Coordinates: 53°27′59″N 107°37′51″W

- Indian reserve
- Witchekan Lake Indian Reserve No. 117
- Location in Saskatchewan
- First Nation: Witchekan Lake
- Country: Canada
- Province: Saskatchewan

Area
  - Total: 6,839.8 ha (16,902 acres)

Population (2016)
  - Total: 687
  - Density: 10.0/km^{2} (26.0/sq mi)

Witchekan Lake 117 is an Indian reserve of the Witchekan Lake First Nation in Saskatchewan. The reserve is on the western shore of Witchekan Lake. It is about 90 kilometres (56 mi) north-east of North Battleford. In the 2016 Canadian Census, it recorded a population of 10 living in 3 of its 3 total private dwellings.

== See also ==
- List of Indian reserves in Saskatchewan
- Witchekan Lake 117D
