= Northern Lights 220 =

Indian reserve in Saskatchewan, Canada

Coordinates: 53°10′49″N 105°45′21″W

- Indian reserve
- Northern Lights Indian Reserve No. 220
- Location in Saskatchewan
- First Nation: Peter Ballantyne
- Country: Canada
- Province: Saskatchewan

Area
  - Total: 2 ha (4.9 acres)

Northern Lights 220 is an Indian reserve of the Peter Ballantyne Cree Nation in Saskatchewan. It is in the city of Prince Albert.

== See also ==
- List of Indian reserves in Saskatchewan
