= Suggi Lake =

Lake in Saskatchewan, Canada

- Location in Saskatchewan Suggi Lake (Canada)
- Location: Northern Administration District, Saskatchewan
- Coordinates: 54.3667°N 102.7838°W
- Part of: Saskatchewan River drainage basin
- Primary inflows: Grassberry River
- Primary outflows: Grassberry River
- Basin countries: Canada
- Surface area: 12,106.2 ha (29,915 acres)
- Surface elevation: 292 m (958 ft)
- Islands: Scheelhaase Island
- Settlements: None

Suggi Lake is a lake in the Canadian province of Saskatchewan. Suggi is Cree for "pelican". The lake is about 50 kilometres (31 mi) north-west of Cumberland House in the Northern Saskatchewan Administration District. There is no road access to the lake and there are no communities along its shores.

Suggi Lake is an important habitat for American white pelicans and is part of an Important Bird Area (IBA) of Canada. Scheelhaase Island Wildlife Refuge (54.3501°N 102.8171°W), which encompasses Scheelhaase Island near the middle of the lake, is a 5-hectare (12-acre) provincial wildlife refuge that is important for migratory birds.

== Description ==
Suggi Lake is situated along the course of Grassberry River, which is a tributary of the Saskatchewan River. The Grassberry River, which begins at Sarginson Lake to the north, enters Suggi Lake on the northern shore and flows out at the eastern end. From the eastern end of the lake, Grassberry River flows directly into Windy Lake and then carries on in a south-west direction where it flows into the Saskatchewan River Delta. Suggi Lake is in the boreal forest ecozone and most of it is surrounded by muskeg and bogs. The south-western shore of the lake has a sandy loam soil.

== Suggi Lake IBA ==
Suggi Lake (SK 104) Important Bird Area (IBA) of Canada encompasses all of Suggi Lake, the western edge of Windy Lake, and much of the surrounding landscape totalling an area of 299.78 km^{2} (115.75 sq mi). The lake is important for many colonial nesting birds, including the American white pelican, double-crested cormorant, great blue heron, California gull, ring-billed gull, herring gull, and the common tern. Two long, skinny islands in the western part of the lake are especially important for American white pelicans.

== See also ==
- List of lakes of Saskatchewan
- List of protected areas of Saskatchewan
