= Cowessess 73A =

Indian reserve in Saskatchewan, Canada

Coordinates: 50°32′20″N 102°34′13″W

- Indian reserve
- Cowessess Indian Reserve No. 73A
- Location in Saskatchewan
- First Nation: Cowessess
- Country: Canada
- Province: Saskatchewan

Area
  - Total: 257.1 ha (635 acres)

Cowessess 73A is an Indian reserve of the Cowessess First Nation in Saskatchewan. It is 31 kilometres west of Esterhazy.

== See also ==
- List of Indian reserves in Saskatchewan
