= Sakimay 74 =

Indian reserve in Saskatchewan, Canada

Coordinates: 50°33′16″N 102°47′48″W

- Indian reserve
- Sakimay Indian Reserve No. 74
- Location in Saskatchewan
- First Nation: Zagime Anishinabek
- Country: Canada
- Province: Saskatchewan

Area
  - Total: 8,751.1 ha (21,624 acres)

Population (2016)
  - Total: 147
  - Density: 1.68/km^{2} (4.35/sq mi)
- Community Well-Being Index: 52

Sakimay 74 is an Indian reserve of the Zagime Anishinabek in Saskatchewan. It is about 16 kilometres (9.9 mi) north-west of Broadview. In the 2016 Canadian Census, it recorded a population of 147 living in 46 of its 170 total private dwellings. In the same year, its Community Well-Being index was calculated at 52 of 100, compared to 58.4 for the average First Nations community and 77.5 for the average non-Indigenous community.

== See also ==
- List of Indian reserves in Saskatchewan
