= Flying Dust 105I =

Indian reserve in Saskatchewan, Canada

Coordinates: 49°43′04″N 103°04′38″W

- Indian reserve
- Flying Dust Indian Reserve No. 105I
- Location in Saskatchewan
- First Nation: Flying Dust
- Country: Canada
- Province: Saskatchewan

Area
  - Total: 191.5 ha (473 acres)

Flying Dust 105I is an Indian reserve of the Flying Dust First Nation in Saskatchewan.

== See also ==
- List of Indian reserves in Saskatchewan
