= Birch Portage 184A =

Indian reserve in Saskatchewan, Canada

Coordinates: 54°53′05″N 102°35′46″W

- Indian reserve
- Birch Portage Indian Reserve No. 184A
- Location in Saskatchewan
- First Nation: Peter Ballantyne
- Country: Canada
- Province: Saskatchewan

Area
  - Total: 1,844.2 ha (4,557 acres)

Birch Portage 184A is an Indian reserve of the Peter Ballantyne Cree Nation in Saskatchewan. It is about 30 miles northwest of Flin Flon.

== See also ==
- List of Indian reserves in Saskatchewan
