= Nemekus Sakahikan 221 =

Indian reserve in Saskatchewan, Canada

Coordinates: 55°21′09″N 102°17′02″W

- Indian reserve
- Nemekus Sakahikan Indian Reserve No. 221
- Location in Saskatchewan
- First Nation: Peter Ballantyne
- Country: Canada
- Province: Saskatchewan

Area
  - Total: 92.9 ha (230 acres)

Nemekus Sakahikan 221 is an Indian reserve of the Peter Ballantyne Cree Nation in Saskatchewan. It is near Tocher Lake.

== See also ==
- List of Indian reserves in Saskatchewan
