= Witchekan Lake First Nation =

Canadian First Nation

Witchekan Lake First Nation (Cree: ᐑᒌᑲᐣ ᓵᑲᐦᐃᑲᓂᕽ wîhcîkan sâkahikanihk, meaning: at the stinking Lake) is a Cree First Nation in Saskatchewan, Canada. Their reserves include:

- Witchekan Lake 117
- Witchekan Lake 117D
