= Flying Dust 105O =

Indian reserve in Saskatchewan, Canada

Coordinates: 49°46′38″N 103°12′32″W

- Indian reserve
- Flying Dust Indian Reserve No. 105O
- Location in Saskatchewan
- First Nation: Flying Dust
- Country: Canada
- Province: Saskatchewan

Area
  - Total: 124.6 ha (308 acres)

Flying Dust 105O is an Indian reserve of the Flying Dust First Nation in Saskatchewan.

== See also ==
- List of Indian reserves in Saskatchewan
