= Little Black Bear First Nation =

First Nation in Saskatchewan, Canada

- Band No. 379
- People: Assiniboine; Cree
- Treaty: Treaty 4
- Headquarters: Goodeve
- Province: Saskatchewan

Land
- Main reserve: Little Black Bear 84
- Reserve: Little Black Bear 84SC
- Land area: 79.017 km^{2} (30.509 sq mi)

Population (2019)
- On reserve: 212
- Off reserve: 380
- Total population: 592

Government
- Chief: Clarence Bellegarde

Tribal Council
- File Hills Qu'Appelle Tribal Council

Little Black Bear First Nation (Cree: ᑲᐢᑭᑌᐤ ᒪᐢᑿ ᒪᐢᑯᓯᐢ kaskitêw-maskwa-maskosis) is a Cree and Assiniboine First Nation in southern Saskatchewan, Canada. Their reserves include:

- Little Black Bear 84
- Little Black Bear 84SC
- Treaty Four Reserve Grounds 77, shared with 32 other bands.
