= Sokatisewin Sakahikan 224 =

Indian reserve in Saskatchewan, Canada

Coordinates: 55°25′02″N 102°28′36″W

- Indian reserve
- Sokatisewin Sakahikan Indian Reserve No. 224
- Location in Saskatchewan
- First Nation: Peter Ballantyne
- Country: Canada
- Province: Saskatchewan

Area
  - Total: 406.4 ha (1,004 acres)

Sokatisewin Sakahikan 224 is an Indian reserve of the Peter Ballantyne Cree Nation in Saskatchewan. It is near Sokatisewin Lake, which is a lake along the course of the Churchill River. Highway 135 passes through the reserve.

== See also ==
- List of Indian reserves in Saskatchewan
