= Sturgeon Weir 205 =

Indian reserve in Saskatchewan, Canada

Coordinates: 54°16′49″N 101°48′56″W

- Indian reserve
- Sturgeon Weir Indian Reserve No. 205
- Location in Saskatchewan
- First Nation: Peter Ballantyne
- Country: Canada
- Province: Saskatchewan

Area
  - Total: 26.3 ha (65 acres)

Sturgeon Weir 205 is an Indian reserve of the Peter Ballantyne Cree Nation in Saskatchewan. It is adjacent to the east side of Sturgeon Weir 184F. Sturgeon Weir primarily corresponds to the settlement of Sturgeon Landing, located directly next to the Manitoba border at the mouth of the Sturgeon-Weir River on Namew Lake. It is accessible by road year round, though only through neighbouring Manitoba, via the short Saskatchewan Highway 967 and Sturgeon Landing Road.

== See also ==
- List of Indian reserves in Saskatchewan
