= Sweetgrass 113-M16 =

Indian reserve in Saskatchewan, Canada

Coordinates: 52°47′20″N 108°32′52″W

- Indian reserve
- Sweetgrass Indian Reserve No. 113-M16
- Location in Saskatchewan
- First Nation: Sweetgrass
- Country: Canada
- Province: Saskatchewan

Area
  - Total: 276.4 ha (683 acres)

Population (2016)
  - Total: 0
  - Density: 0.0/km^{2} (0.0/sq mi)

Sweetgrass 113-M16 is an Indian reserve of the Sweetgrass First Nation in Saskatchewan. It is about 11 kilometres (6.8 mi) west of North Battleford. In the 2016 Canadian Census, it recorded a population of 0 living in 1 of its 1 total private dwellings.

== See also ==
- List of Indian reserves in Saskatchewan
