= Woody Lake 184D =

Indian reserve in Saskatchewan, Canada

Coordinates: 55°13′37″N 103°11′10″W

- Indian reserve
- Woody Lake Indian Reserve No. 184D
- Location in Saskatchewan
- First Nation: Peter Ballantyne
- Country: Canada
- Province: Saskatchewan

Area
  - Total: 677.1 ha (1,673 acres)

Woody Lake 184D is an Indian reserve of the Peter Ballantyne Cree Nation in Saskatchewan. It is about 97 kilometres (60 mi) north-west of Flin Flon, and on the southern portion of the eastern shore of Wood Lake.

== See also ==
- List of Indian reserves in Saskatchewan
