= Cowessess 73 =

Indian reserve in Saskatchewan, Canada

Coordinates: 50°34′55″N 102°40′17″W

- Indian reserve
- Cowessess Indian Reserve No. 73
- Location in Saskatchewan
- First Nation: Cowessess
- Country: Canada
- Province: Saskatchewan

Area
  - Total: 41,927.2 ha (103,604 acres)

Population (2016)
  - Total: 540
  - Density: 1.3/km^{2} (3.3/sq mi)
- Community Well-Being Index: 63

Cowessess 73 is an Indian reserve of the Cowessess First Nation in Saskatchewan. It is 13 kilometres (8.1 mi) north-west of Broadview. In the 2016 Canadian Census, it recorded a population of 540 living in 190 of its 214 total private dwellings. In the same year, its Community Well-Being index was calculated at 63 of 100, compared to 58.4 for the average First Nations community and 77.5 for the average non-Indigenous community.

In June 2021, anomalies in the earth suspected of containing the remains of 751 children were found at the former Marieval Indian residential school in Marieval, part of the Canadian Indian residential school system, the most found in Canada to date.

== See also ==
- List of Indian reserves in Saskatchewan
