= Pelican Narrows 206 =

Indian reserve in Saskatchewan, Canada

Coordinates: 55°11′17″N 102°52′54″W

- Indian reserve
- Pelican Narrows Indian Reserve No. 206
- Location in Saskatchewan
- First Nation: Peter Ballantyne
- Country: Canada
- Province: Saskatchewan

Area
  - Total: 1,744.2 ha (4,310 acres)

Pelican Narrows 206 is an Indian reserve of the Peter Ballantyne Cree Nation in Saskatchewan. It is about 5 kilometres (3.1 mi) north of the village of Pelican Narrows on the eastern shore of Pelican Lake.

== See also ==
- List of Indian reserves in Saskatchewan
