= Flying Dust First Nation =

Cree First Nations, Saskatchewan, Canada

Coordinates: 54°08′14.47″N 108°24′6.09″W

- Band No. 395
- Kopahawakenum
- People: Cree
- Treaty: Treaty 6
- Headquarters: Meadow Lake
- Province: Saskatchewan

Land
- Main reserve: Flying Dust 105
- Reserves: Flying Dust 105D; Flying Dust 105E; Flying Dust 105F; Flying Dust 105H; Flying Dust 105I; Flying Dust 105J; Flying Dust 105L; Flying Dust 105O; Gladue Lake 105B; Meadow Lake 105A; Meadow Lake 105C
- Land area: 94.00

Population (2021)
- On reserve: 592
- Off reserve: 937
- Total population: 1,529

Government
- Chief: Tyson Bear

Tribal Council
- Meadow Lake Tribal Council

Website
- flyingdust.net

The Flying Dust First Nation (Cree: ᑳ ᐅᐦᐹᐘᐦᑳᐢᑕᕽ kâ-ohpâwahkâstahk) is a Cree First Nation band government located adjacent to the city of Meadow Lake in Saskatchewan, Canada. Highway 55 goes through the band's reserve community.

== Indian reserves ==
The band governs twelve reserves:

- Flying Dust 105 - 37.57 km^{2} (14.51 sq mi)
- Flying Dust 105D - 24.771 km^{2} (9.564 sq mi)
- Flying Dust 105E - 4.37 km^{2} (1.69 sq mi)
- Flying Dust 105F - 13.001 km^{2} (5.020 sq mi)
- Flying Dust 105H - 1.266 km^{2} (0.489 sq mi)
- Flying Dust 105I - 1.915 km^{2} (0.739 sq mi)
- Flying Dust 105J - 5.031 km^{2} (1.942 sq mi)
- Flying Dust 105L - 1.278 km^{2} (0.493 sq mi)
- Flying Dust 105O - 1.246 km^{2} (0.481 sq mi)
- Gladue Lake 105B - 0.978 km^{2} (0.378 sq mi)
- Meadow Lake 105A - 2.573 km^{2} (0.993 sq mi)
- Meadow Lake 105C - 0.002 km^{2} (0.00077 sq mi)

== Demographics ==
Canada census – Flying Dust First Nation 105 community profile

	2021	2011
Population	679 (+17.7% from 2016)	506 (-18.3% from 2006)
Land area	36.09 km^{2} (13.93 sq mi)	36.81 km^{2} (14.21 sq mi)
Population density	18.8/km^{2} (49/sq mi)	13.7/km^{2} (35/sq mi)
Median age	27.8 (M: 24.6, F: 31.4)	22.2 (M: 20.7, F: 22.9)
Private dwellings	228 (total) 207 (occupied)	157 (total)
Median household income	$77,000

References: 2021 2011

Registered Population Year by Year
2003	2004	2005	2006	2007	2008	2009	2010	2011	2012	2013	2014	2015	2016	2017	2018	2019	2020
991	1000	1040	1064	1081	1117	1145	1159	1209	1271	1311	1338	1356	1371	1405	1426	1471	1497

== Government ==
The Flying Dust First Nation is governed by a chief and four councillors. Flying Dust is a member of the Meadow Lake Tribal Council, whose offices are located on the reserve.

== Community services and enterprises ==
With 1,529 members (592 living on-reserve and 937 living off-reserve) the community has developed a reputation as a progressive and strong community. Facilities on-reserve include the Kopahawakenum Community School (Pre-K-8), a health clinic, an elders building, an administration building, a bank, a community hall, a community church, a health office, a radio station, a youth centre, infrastructure/maintenance compound, daycare, a hockey arena, gas station and convenience store. The community hosted the 2003 Saskatchewan First Nations Summer Games, as well as their first annual Pow wow in 2005.

The Flying Dust First Nation has developed several business partnerships to increase its business portfolios to Property Development, Oil & Gas & Forestry. It also has a great economic stability. It manages a 12,000-acre (49 km^{2}) Farming, Sand and Gravel Operation. Flying Dust is a treaty land entitlement band with the capability of purchasing 6,788 more acres of land. The Flying Dust has a long-standing partnership with the town of Meadow Lake and they have worked jointly on several major projects in the region over the last few decades.
