= Manawanstawayak 230 =

Indian reserve in Saskatchewan, Canada

Coordinates: 55°21′09″N 103°22′31″W

- Indian reserve
- Manawanstawayak Indian Reserve No. 230
- Location in Saskatchewan
- First Nation: Peter Ballantyne
- Country: Canada
- Province: Saskatchewan

Area
  - Total: 116.1 ha (287 acres)

Manawanstawayak 230 is an Indian reserve of the Peter Ballantyne Cree Nation in Saskatchewan.

== See also ==
- List of Indian reserves in Saskatchewan
