= Makwa Lake 129C =

Indian reserve in Saskatchewan, Canada

Coordinates: 54°02′54″N 109°05′52″W

- Indian reserve
- Makwa Lake Indian Reserve No. 129C
- Location in Saskatchewan
- First Nation: Makwa Sahgaiehcan
- Country: Canada
- Province: Saskatchewan

Area
  - Total: 191 ha (470 acres)

Population (2016)
  - Total: 10
  - Density: 5.2/km^{2} (14/sq mi)

Makwa Lake 129C is an Indian reserve of the Makwa Sahgaiehcan First Nation in Saskatchewan. It is about 95 miles north-west of North Battleford. In the 2016 Canadian Census, it recorded a population of 10 living in 4 of its 5 total private dwellings.

== See also ==
- List of Indian reserves in Saskatchewan
