= Sweetgrass First Nation =

Cree First Nation reserve in Canada

Coordinates: 52°49′02″N 108°33′05″W

- wîhkaso-kisêyin
- People: Cree
- Treaty: Treaty 6
- Headquarters: Cut Knife
- Province: Saskatchewan

Land
- Main reserve: Sweetgrass 113
- Land area: 205.73 km^{2} (79.43 sq mi)

Population (2019)
- On reserve: 749
- Total population: 2051

Government
- Chief: Lori Whitecalf
- Council: Donovan Arcand; Rod Atcheynum; Ray Fox; Hazen Paskimin; Trina Albert; Isaac Thomas

Tribal Council
- Battlefords Agency Tribal Chiefs Inc.

Website
- sweetgrassfirstnation.ca

The Sweetgrass First Nation (Cree: ᐑᐦᑲᓱᑭᓭᔨᐣ, wîhkaso-kisêyin) is a Cree First Nation reserve in Cut Knife, Saskatchewan, Canada. Their territory is 35 kilometres west of Battleford.

== History ==
The Cree (nêhiyawak) occupy Saskatchewan from the northern woodlands to the southern plains. Southern Cree groups moved onto the prairies in 1740 and became middlemen in the fur trade, forming an alliance with the Saulteaux and Assiniboine in the Iron Confederacy. After the Cree maintained positive relations with European traders and held their trading advantage through the late 1800s, they became the dominant indigenous group in the northern section of North America.

The reserve was established when Chief Sweetgrass signed Treaty 6 on September 9, 1876, with the Fort Pitt Indians. Chief Sweetgrass was killed six months after signing Treaty 6, after which Sweetgrass's son, Apseenes (Young Sweet Grass), succeeded him. Apseenes was unsuccessful in leading the band so Wah-wee-kah-oo-tah-mah-hote (Strikes him on the back) became Chief after he signed Treaty 6 in 1876 at Fort Carlton. Wah-wee-kah-oo-tah-mah-hote served as Chief between 1876 and 1883 but was deposed and Apseenes took over as Chief.

In August 2022, they became a signatory of the Buffalo Treaty.

== Culture ==
The Cree believe that humans have an intimate relationship with their environment. For example, hunters have pawâkanak (dream helpers) which lead them to game. The Cree also valued oral story telling and wâhkotowin (kinship) which is important for growing the connection with the Spirit of Nêhiyawêwin. Cree elders have found that their environment is capable of healing the mind and spirit. One Sweetgrass First Nation Elder, Archie Weenie, believes that land and plants have the power and energy to communicate with people which serves as a means of survival.

== Population ==
As of December 31, 2019, the Sweetgrass First Nation consists of 2051 registered band members. 749 people, including non-first nation people and people from other first nations, currently live on the reserve. The nation is currently led by Chief Lori Whitecalf.

== Lands ==
After Wah-wee-kah-oo-tah-mah-hote signed Treaty 6 at Fort Carlton on August 28, 1876, a reserve was established west of Battleford in 1884. Here, melded band members maintained crops and livestock while selling wood and hay to support their economy. The band currently controls 20,573.80 hectares of land with the largest block being 26 kilometers west of North Battleford.

=== Land use ===
38% of Sweetgrass First Nation land is used for cropland, 21% is native grassland, 34% is tree cover, and 2% constitutes small bodies of water and marshes. Other classes of land include forage and treed areas and other uses include residential areas.

=== Reserves ===
The Sweetgrass Nation currently controls the following reserves:

- Sweetgrass 113
- Sweetgrass 113A
- Sweetgrass 113B
- Sweetgrass 113-C7
- Sweetgrass 113-C19
- Sweetgrass 113-D12
- Sweetgrass 113-E22
- Sweetgrass 113-F16
- Sweetgrass 113-G7
- Sweetgrass 113-H1
- Sweetgrass 113-I4
- Sweetgrass 113-J3
- Sweetgrass 113-K32
- Sweetgrass 113-L6
- Sweetgrass 113-M16
- Sweetgrass 113-N27
- Sweetgrass 113-P2
- Sweetgrass 113-S6

== Government ==
The Sweetgrass First Nation is governed by an elected seven-member Chief and Council. The nation is a member of a tribal council--the Battlefords Agency Tribal Chiefs (BATC). As of May 2025, Sweetgrass First Nation is represented on BATC committees by Chief Lori Whitecalf (BATC Executive Council, and BATC Investments - Chair) and Councillors Trina Albert (BATC Social Development, BATC Employment & Training, BATC Athletics), Donovan Arcand (BATC Investments), Kelsey Pooyak (BATC Housing), and Isaac Thomas (BATC Community Development Corporation).

=== Chiefs ===
List of historic chiefs:

- Sweetgrass (1876)
- Wah-wee-kah-oo-tah-mah-hote (1876–1883)
- Apseenes (1884–1886)
- Harry Atcheynum (1920–1924)
- Sam Swimmer (1925–1964)
- Andrew Swimmer (1956–1957)
- Ben Atcheynum (1957–1958)
- James Favel (1958–1959)
- Solomon Albert (1959–1960)
- John Weenie (1961–1962)
- Adam Paskemin (1963–1964)
- Ben Atcheynum (1965–1966)
- Joseph Weenie (1967–1970)
- Ben Atcheynum (1971–1972)
- Stephen Pooyak (1972–1973)
- Ben Weenie (1973–1974)
- Stephen Pooyak (1974–1979)
- Gordon Albert (1979–1982)
- Roderick Atcheynum (1983–1984)
- Don Pooyak (1985–1988)
- Edward Wayne Standinghorn (1989–1999)
- Tommy Whitecalf (2000–2003)
- Rod Atcheynum Jr. (2003–2005)
- Edward Wayne Standinghorn (2005–2011)
- Lori Whitecalf (2011–2017)
- Laurence Paskemin (2017–2019)
- Lori Whitecalf (2019–present)

== Economic development ==
According to the Sweetgrass First Nation 2020–2021 Annual Report, the band has planned to increase source revenues, focusing on revenues from investments made on urban reserve. The band was approved for $160,000 in funding from Indigenous Services Canada to be used for site infrastructure. The band also increased employment by partnering with the BATC Atoskewin Success Centre to build two tiny homes which are now being occupied by tenants.
