= Sweetgrass 113 =

Indian reserve in Saskatchewan, Canada

Coordinates: 52°45′18″N 108°41′27″W

- Indian reserve
- Sweetgrass Indian Reserve No. 113
- Location in Saskatchewan
- First Nation: Sweetgrass
- Country: Canada
- Province: Saskatchewan

Area
  - Total: 15,683 ha (38,750 acres)

Population (2016)
  - Total: 643
  - Density: 4.10/km^{2} (10.6/sq mi)
- Community Well-Being Index: 55

Sweetgrass 113 is an Indian reserve of the Sweetgrass First Nation in Saskatchewan. It is about 26 kilometres (16 mi) west of North Battleford. In the 2016 Canadian Census, it recorded a population of 643 living in 169 of its 181 total private dwellings. In the same year, its Community Well-Being index was calculated at 55 of 100, compared to 58.4 for the average First Nations community and 77.5 for the average non-Indigenous community.

== See also ==
- List of Indian reserves in Saskatchewan
