= Mistik Reserve =

Indian reserve in Saskatchewan, Canada

Coordinates: 54°51′54″N 103°22′35″W

- Indian reserve
- Mistik Indian Reserve
- Location in Saskatchewan
- First Nation: Peter Ballantyne
- Country: Canada
- Province: Saskatchewan

Area
  - Total: 1,639.9 ha (4,052 acres)

The Mistik Reserve is an Indian reserve of the Peter Ballantyne Cree Nation in Saskatchewan on the shores of Deschambault Lake.

== See also ==
- List of Indian reserves in Saskatchewan
