= Little Bone 74B =

Indian reserve in Saskatchewan, Canada

Coordinates: 51°01′47″N 102°25′48″W

- Indian reserve
- Little Bone Indian Reserve No. 74B
- Location in Saskatchewan
- First Nation: Zagime Anishinabek
- Country: Canada
- Province: Saskatchewan

Area
  - Total: 190.3 ha (470 acres)

Population (2016)
  - Total: 24
  - Density: 13/km^{2} (33/sq mi)

Little Bone 74B is an Indian reserve of the Zagime Anishinabek in Saskatchewan. It is in Townships 23 and 24, Ranges 3 and 4, west of the Second Meridian. In the 2016 Canadian Census, it recorded a population of 24 living in 8 of its 8 total private dwellings.

== See also ==
- List of Indian reserves in Saskatchewan
