= Flying Dust 105 =

Indian reserve in Saskatchewan, Canada

- Indian reserve
- Flying Dust Indian Reserve No. 105
- Location in Saskatchewan
- Coordinates: 54°09′26″N 108°23′10″W
- First Nation: Flying Dust
- Country: Canada
- Province: Saskatchewan

Area
  - Total: 3,757 ha (9,280 acres)

Population (2016)
  - Total: 577
  - Density: 15.4/km^{2} (39.8/sq mi)
- Community Well-Being Index: 63

Flying Dust 105 is an Indian reserve of the Flying Dust First Nation in Saskatchewan. It is less than a kilometre north-west of Meadow Lake. In the 2016 Canadian Census, it recorded a population of 577 living in 169 of its 187 total private dwellings. In the same year, its Community Well-Being index was calculated at 63 of 100, compared to 58.4 for the average First Nations community and 77.5 for the average non-Indigenous community.

== See also ==
- List of Indian reserves in Saskatchewan
