= Muskeg River 20C =

Coordinates: 54°03′55″N 102°39′11″W

- Indian reserve
- Muskeg River Indian Reserve No. 20C
- Location in Saskatchewan
- First Nation: Cumberland House
- Country: Canada
- Province: Saskatchewan

Area
  - Total: 95.1 ha (235 acres)

Muskeg River 20C is an Indian reserve of the Cumberland House Cree Nation in Saskatchewan. It is in Township 58, Range 5, west of the Second Meridian.
