= Waskwiatik Sakahikan 223 =

Indian reserve in Saskatchewan, Canada

Coordinates: 55°21′33″N 102°27′03″W

- Indian reserve
- Waskwiatik Sakahikan Indian Reserve No. 223
- Location in Saskatchewan
- First Nation: Peter Ballantyne
- Country: Canada
- Province: Saskatchewan

Area
  - Total: 871.4 ha (2,153 acres)

Waskwiatik Sakahikan 223 is an Indian reserve of the Peter Ballantyne Cree Nation in Saskatchewan. It is on Oskotim Lake.

== See also ==
- List of Indian reserves in Saskatchewan
