= Muskwaminiwatim 225 =

Indian reserve in Saskatchewan, Canada

Coordinates: 54°40′29″N 103°43′10″W

- Indian reserve
- Muskwaminiwatim Indian Reserve No. 225
- Location in Saskatchewan
- First Nation: Peter Ballantyne
- Country: Canada
- Province: Saskatchewan

Area
  - Total: 2,606.3 ha (6,440 acres)

Muskwaminiwatim 225 is an Indian reserve of the Peter Ballantyne Cree Nation in Saskatchewan. It is near Ballantyne Bay on Deschambault Lake. The southern boundary of the reserve runs along the Ballantyne River.

== See also ==
- List of Indian reserves in Saskatchewan
