= Meadow Lake 105A =

Indian reserve in Saskatchewan, Canada

Coordinates: 54°02′33″N 108°31′20″W

- Indian reserve
- Meadow Lake Indian Reserve No. 105A
- Location in Saskatchewan
- First Nation: Flying Dust
- Country: Canada
- Province: Saskatchewan

Area
  - Total: 257.3 ha (636 acres)

Population (2016)
  - Total: 0
  - Density: 0.0/km^{2} (0.0/sq mi)

Meadow Lake 105A is an Indian reserve of the Flying Dust First Nation in Saskatchewan. It is 7 miles south-west of Meadow Lake. In the 2016 Canadian Census, it recorded a population of 0 living in 0 of its 1 total private dwellings.

== See also ==
- List of Indian reserves in Saskatchewan
