= Deschambault Lake (Saskatchewan) =

Lake in Saskatchewan, Canada

- Location in Saskatchewan Deschambault Lake (Canada)
- Location: Northern Administration District, Saskatchewan
- Coordinates: 54°47′N 103°25′W
- Part of: Saskatchewan River drainage basin
- Primary inflows: Ballantyne River; Deschambault River
- River sources: Cub Hills
- Primary outflows: Channel to Pelican Lake
- Catchment area: 7,356 km^{2} (2,840 sq mi)
- Basin countries: Canada
- Surface area: 542 km^{2} (209 sq mi)
- Average depth: 6.2 m (20 ft)
- Max. depth: 22.4 m (73 ft)
- Water volume: 3,350,000 dam^{3} (2,720,000 acre⋅ft)
- Residence time: 4.7 years
- Shore length^{1}: 680 km (420 mi)
- Surface elevation: 322 m (1,056 ft)
- Frozen: October to May
- Islands: McIntyre Island; Robertson Island; Carey Island; Tower Island
- Settlements: Deschambault Lake
- ^{1} Shore length is not a well-defined measure.

Deschambault Lake /dəˈʃæmboʊ/ is a freshwater lake in the north-eastern region of the Canadian province of Saskatchewan. The identically named community of Deschambault Lake resides on its shore. There are also four Indian reserves on the lake — Kimosom Pwatinahk 203, Mistik Reserve, Pisiwiminiwatim 207, and Muskwaminiwatim 225 — and a provincial recreation site. Deschambault Lake is the ninth largest lake in Saskatchewan.

Access to Deschambault Lake and its amenities is from Highways 106 and 911.

== Description ==
Deschambault Lake is a large lake divided into two sections by the Deschambault Channel. The western section is known as Ballantyne Bay. While several rivers flow into the lake, Deschambault and Ballantyne Rivers are the primary inflows. Other significant ones include Puskwakan River and Palf Creek. Deschambault River begins at Wapawekka Lake and drains the nearby Wapawekka Hills. Ballantyne River begins at Big Sandy Lake and drains the Cub Hills. Deschambault Lake and its catchment are part of the Sturgeon-Weir River drainage basin. The Sturgeon-Weir River is a tributary of the Saskatchewan River.

== Parks and recreation ==
The provincial Deschambault Lake (South East Arm) Recreation Site (54.7062°N 103.2346°W) is situated on the Southeast Arm of Deschambault Lake. It is leased by Northern Lights Lodge, which also has a facility at the neighbouring Limestone Lake. Northern Lights Lodge is a fishing lodge with a campground, cabins, and access to the lake for fishing. There is also a dock and boats for rent.

Deschambault Lake Resort is on the eastern shore of Ballantyne Bay. The resort has a motel, cabins, and a campground. There is access to the lake for fishing, boating, and swimming.

The Puskwakau River enters Deschambault Lake at the south end of Ballantyne Bay. Puskwakau River Recreation Site (54.5104°N 103.5278°W) is just upstream from the river's mouth where Highway 106 crosses it. The park has a small campground and access to the river for fishing.

== Fish species ==
Fish commonly found in Deschambault Lake include burbot, cisco, lake whitefish, longnose sucker, northern pike, walleye, white sucker, and yellow perch.

== See also ==
- List of lakes of Saskatchewan
- Tourism in Saskatchewan
