= Gladue Lake 105B =

Indian reserve in Saskatchewan, Canada

Coordinates: 54°27′06″N 108°14′41″W

- Indian reserve
- Gladue Lake Indian Reserve No. 105B
- Location in Saskatchewan
- First Nation: Flying Dust
- Country: Canada
- Province: Saskatchewan

Area
  - Total: 97.8 ha (242 acres)

Gladue Lake 105B is an Indian reserve of the Flying Dust First Nation in Saskatchewan, Canada. It is in Township 63, Range 15, west of the Third Meridian, in the Jarvis Lake area.

== See also ==
- List of Indian reserves in Saskatchewan
