= Cowessess First Nation =

Saulteaux First Nations band government in Canada

- Band No. 361
- People: Saulteaux, Cree
- Treaty: Treaty 4
- Headquarters: Cowessess
- Province: Saskatchewan

Land
- Main reserve: Cowessess 73
- Reserve: Cowessess 73A
- Land area: 421.843 km^{2} (162.874 sq mi)

Population (2019)
- On reserve: 846
- Off reserve: 3,449
- Total population: 4,295

Government
- Chief: Erica Beaudin

Website
- cowessessfn.com

Cowessess First Nation (Ojibwe: Gaa-awaazhishiid) is a Saulteaux First Nations band government in southern Saskatchewan, Canada. The band's main reserve is Cowessess 73, one of several adjoining Indigenous communities in the Qu'Appelle Valley. The band also administers Cowessess 73A, near Esterhazy, and Treaty Four Reserve Grounds 77, which is shared with 32 other bands.

== History ==
The First Nation is named for Chief Cowessess (Ka-wezauce, "Little Boy", or "Little Child"), who was the leader of a mixed band of Plains Cree, Saulteaux and Métis. They were nomadic bison hunters, ranging from Leech Lake (Saskatchewan) as far southwest as the Milk River basin in Montana. In September 1874, Cowessess signed Treaty 4 at Fort Qu'Appelle, ceding his group's Indigenous title to the British Crown. They continued to roam until 1878-79, when they began farming near Maple Creek in the Cypress Hills. In 1880, a reserve was surveyed for them at Crooked Lake, in the Qu'Appelle Valley. Cowessess himself remained in the Cypress Hills until spring 1883, but Headman Louis O'Soup led a dissident group which settled on the reserve.

The community was originally known as Crooked Lake Mission, until it was granted a post office by the name Marieval in 1908.

=== Marieval Indian Residential School ===
The Missionary Oblates of Mary Immaculate built a log schoolhouse in 1880. In 1898, a residential school opened, operated by the Sisters of St. Joseph of St. Hyacinthe. As in the wider Canadian Indian residential school system, physical and sexual abuse were widespread. Parents of the Cowessess reserve petitioned for a non-sectarian day school as early as 1949, but were dismissed. The federal government took control of the building in 1968, and the school passed to First Nation control in 1981. The school closed in 1997 and was demolished in 1999.

Although local management improved conditions somewhat, abusive practices continued into the 1990s. Amber K. K. Pelletier, who attended the Marieval residence from 1993 to 1997, was the youngest survivor interviewed by the Truth and Reconciliation Commission of Canada.

In June 2021, using ground-penetrating radar, the Cowessess First Nation located 751 unmarked graves on the Marieval school site.

=== Reserve surrender ===
Almost immediately, white settlers near Cowessess began petitioning to have the southern portion of the reserve surrendered for sale. In the 1890s, these requests were refused by the Indian agent, who was concerned about the First Nation's ability to increase its stock. Residents and territorial legislators unsuccessfully sent appeals to Ottawa in 1899 and 1902. Under Frank Oliver's ministry, reserve surrenders were actively pursued by the federal government, and approval to issue a surrender document was given in October 1906. The band held a vote on January 29, 1907. With 15 members in favour, and 14 against, with the deciding vote cast by the English interpreter, the land was subdivided in May.

In 1981, the Cowessess First Nation submitted a specific claim to the federal government, challenging the surrender on the grounds of fraud, fiduciary duty, and unconscionable conduct. Almost 75% of the First Nation's open arable land had been lost, leaving it unable to support itself. Allegations were also raised about the role of the band's English interpreter, who had a vested interest in the surrender. While Cowessess' earlier claims were rejected, the First Nation has been able to participate in Saskatchewan's umbrella Treaty Land Entitlement process, expanding its reserve lands through a modern willing-seller buyback process.

=== Buffalo Treaty ===
In August 2023, they became a signatory to the Buffalo Treaty.
