= Cumberland House Cree Nation =

First Nation in Saskatchewan, Canada

- Band No. 350
- ᑳ ᒥᓂᐢᑎᑯ ᒥᓇᐦᐃᑯᐢᑳᕽ kâ-ministiko-minahikoskâhk
- People: Swampy Cree
- Treaty: Treaty 5
- Headquarters: Cumberland House
- Province: Saskatchewan

Land
- Main reserve: Cumberland House 20
- Reserves: Pine Bluff 20A; Pine Bluff 20B; Muskeg River 20C; Budd's Point 20D
- Land area: 21.458 km^{2} (8.285 sq mi)

Population (2019)
- On reserve: 912
- Off reserve: 837
- Total population: 1749

Government
- Chief: Rene Chaboyer

Tribal Council
- Prince Albert Grand Council

Website
- chcn.ca

Cumberland House Cree Nation (Swampy Cree: ᑳ ᒥᓂᐢᑎᑯ ᒥᓇᐦᐃᑯᐢᑳᕽ, romanized: kâ-ministiko-minahikoskâhk, lit. 'Spruce Island') is a Swampy Cree First Nations band government in Saskatchewan, Canada. Their reserves include:

- Budd's Point 20D
- Cumberland House Cree Nation 20
- Muskeg River 20C
- Pine Bluff 20A
- Pine Bluff 20B

On September 7, 1876, Chief John Cochrane, along with councillors Albert Flett and Peter Chapman signed the Adhesion to Treaty Five at The Pas, Manitoba, on behalf of those residing in the territories of "Cumberland Island, Sturgeon River, Angling River, Pine Bluff, Beaver Lake and the Ratty Country," in an amalgamation known as the "Cumberland Band." John Cochrane served as Chief of the band until his death in the winter of 1879-1880. On September 2, 1880, Albert Flett was elected Chief. Peter Chapman resigned as councillor, and two new councillors were elected; John Harcus and William Head.Albert Flett served two consecutive terms, with Councillors Thomas Ballendine and Philip Canada being elected in 1883. On August 23, 1886, Samuel Greenleaf was elected Chief along with Councillors Philip Canada and Jeremiah Crane.

By 1884, Councillor Philip Canada and “about ten families who, for some time, have farmed at Pine Island Bluff, some 20 miles northwest of Cumberland House” asked for a reserve at that location. However, a reserve at Pine Bluff was not surveyed until September 1912. Henry Budd also requested permission in 1884 “to settle on a piece of land good for farming between Cumberland and Birch River Reserves. This area later became known as Budd’s Point and a reserve of 640 acres was surveyed there in 1926.

On August 14th, 1889, Albert Flett was selected, without election, as Chief, along with Councillors Jeremiah Crane and Samuel Greenleaf. Three years later, on August 5th, 1892, Jeremiah Crane was elected Chief for three years, along with Councillors Joseph Paul and George Cook. When the next election was held on August 5th, 1895, Albert Flett was again elected as Chief, with Joseph Paul and George Cook remaining in their positions as councillors.

In October of 1896, Chief Albert Flett was sent from Cumberland to the Selkirk Asylum for the Insane in Southern Manitoba. During Chief Flett's time in Selkirk, Jeremiah Crane assumed position as "Acting Councillor" in place of the Chief, although it is currently unclear if he was elected into this position. In June 1897, a letter was sent to the Superintendent of Indian Affairs which stated that Chief Flett was "totally unfit to case for himself and that there is no present prospect of his recovery," and the minister recommended that Chief Flett be deposed as Chief of the Cumberland Band of Indians. Chief Flett died in Selkirk in November 1901, and the position of Chief remained vacant for several years.
