= Witchekan Lake 117D =

Indian reserve in Saskatchewan, Canada

Coordinates: 53°30′13″N 107°37′31″W

- Indian reserve
- Witchekan Lake Indian Reserve No. 117D
- Location in Saskatchewan
- First Nation: Witchekan Lake
- Country: Canada
- Province: Saskatchewan

Area
  - Total: 1,061.5 ha (2,623 acres)

Population (2016)
  - Total: 325
  - Density: 30.6/km^{2} (79.3/sq mi)
- Community Well-Being Index: 46

Witchekan Lake 117D is an Indian reserve of the Witchekan Lake First Nation in Saskatchewan. It is about 16 kilometres (9.9 mi) north of Spiritwood. In the 2016 Canadian Census, it recorded a population of 325 living in 73 of its 80 total private dwellings. In the same year, its Community Well-Being index was calculated at 46 of 100, compared to 58.4 for the average First Nations community and 77.5 for the average non-Indigenous community.

== See also ==
- List of Indian reserves in Saskatchewan
- Witchekan Lake 117
