= Saskatchewan Highway 911 =

Provincial highway in Saskatchewan, Canada

Highway 911

Route information
- Maintained by Ministry of Highways and Infrastructure
- Length: 31 km (19 mi)

Major junctions
- South end: Highway 106 south of Deschambault Lake
- North end: Kistapiskow Road at Deschambault Lake

Location
- Country: Canada
- Province: Saskatchewan

Highway system
- Provincial highways in Saskatchewan
← Highway 910	→ Highway 912

Highway 911 is a provincial highway in the north-east region of the Canadian province of Saskatchewan. It runs from Highway 106 to a dead end at Deschambault Lake. It is about 31 kilometres (19 mi) long.

== See also ==
- Roads in Saskatchewan
- Transportation in Saskatchewan
