= Little Black Bear 84 =

Indian reserve in Saskatchewan, Canada

Coordinates: 50°59′54″N 103°22′47″W

- Indian reserve
- Little Black Bear Indian Reserve No. 84
- Location in Saskatchewan
- First Nation: Little Black Bear
- Country: Canada
- Province: Saskatchewan

Area
  - Total: 6,860 ha (17,000 acres)

Population (2016)
  - Total: 137
  - Density: 2.00/km^{2} (5.17/sq mi)
- Community Well-Being Index: 51

Little Black Bear 84 is an Indian reserve of the Little Black Bear First Nation in Saskatchewan. It is about 19 kilometres (12 mi) east of Fort Qu'Appelle. In the 2016 Canadian Census, it recorded a population of 137 living in 34 of its 43 total private dwellings. In the same year, its Community Well-Being index was calculated at 51 of 100, compared to 58.4 for the average First Nations community and 77.5 for the average non-Indigenous community.

== See also ==
- List of Indian reserves in Saskatchewan
