= Sweetgrass 113-L6 =

Indian reserve in Saskatchewan, Canada

Coordinates: 52°40′35″N 107°35′23″W

- Indian reserve
- Sweetgrass Indian Reserve No. 113-L6
- Location in Saskatchewan
- First Nation: Sweetgrass
- Country: Canada
- Province: Saskatchewan

Area
  - Total: 513.5 ha (1,269 acres)

Population (2016)
  - Total: 0
  - Density: 0.0/km^{2} (0.0/sq mi)

Sweetgrass 113-L6 is an Indian reserve of the Sweetgrass First Nation in Saskatchewan. It is about 47 kilometres (29 mi) east of North Battleford. In the 2016 Canadian Census, it recorded a population of 0 living in 0 of its 0 total private dwellings.

== See also ==
- List of Indian reserves in Saskatchewan
