= Big Sandy Lake (Saskatchewan) =

Lake in Saskatchewan, Canada

- Location in Saskatchewan Big Sandy Lake (Canada)
- Location: Northern Administration District, Saskatchewan
- Coordinates: 54.4501°N 104.1004°W
- Part of: Saskatchewan River drainage basin
- River sources: Cub Hills
- Primary outflows: Ballantyne River
- Basin countries: Canada
- Surface area: 8,083.5 ha (19,975 acres)
- Average depth: 10 m (33 ft)
- Max. depth: 12.2 m (40 ft)
- Shore length^{1}: 53.4 km (33.2 mi)
- Surface elevation: 395 m (1,296 ft)
- Settlements: None
- ^{1} Shore length is not a well-defined measure.

Big Sandy Lake is a lake in the Saskatchewan River watershed in the Canadian province of Saskatchewan. The lake is north-east of Narrow Hills Provincial Park at the eastern base of the Cub Hills in the Northern Administration District. It is situated in the Mid-Boreal Uplands Ecoregion in a boreal forest of pine, birch, aspen, and spruce.

Along the northern shore of Big Sandy Lake is an outfitter and a provincial recreation site. Access is from the Hanson Lake Road.

== Description ==
At about 10 metres (33 ft) deep, and with a surface area of 8,083.5 hectares (19,975 acres), Big Sandy Lake is a relatively shallow lake for its size. Several creeks and rivers flow into the lake from the slopes of the Cub Hills, nearby smaller lakes, and surrounding muskeg. Some of those lakes include Jayjay, Minnow, Warne, Floren, and Beck. Ballantyne River flows out of Big Sandy Lake from its eastern shore and heads east flowing into Deschambault Lake. Big Sandy Lake is in the Sturgeon-Weir River drainage basin, which is a tributary of the Saskatchewan River.

== Outfitter and recreation site ==
Big Sandy Lake Recreation Site (54.4849°N 104.1854°W) has a campground with 13 campsites and the outfitters, Big Sandy Lake Outdoor Adventures, has cabin rentals. The outfitter leases and operates the 430-hectare recreation site from the provincial government. The campground and cabins have access to washrooms, showers, and laundry. At the lake, there is a boat launch and fish cleaning station. Other activities at the site include hiking, ATVing, and, in the winter, snowmobiling.

== Fish species ==
Fish commonly found in Big Sandy Lake include walleye, northern pike, whitefish, cisco, white sucker, and yellow perch. In 2010, the lake was stocked with 40,000 walleye.

== See also ==
- List of lakes of Saskatchewan
- Tourism in Saskatchewan
- List of protected areas of Saskatchewan
