= Sandy Narrows 184C =

Indian reserve in Saskatchewan, Canada

Coordinates: 55°02′23″N 103°03′17″W

- Indian reserve
- Sandy Narrows Indian Reserve No. 184C
- Location in Saskatchewan
- First Nation: Peter Ballantyne
- Country: Canada
- Province: Saskatchewan

Area
  - Total: 1,077.7 ha (2,663 acres)

Sandy Narrows 184C is an Indian reserve of the Peter Ballantyne Cree Nation in Saskatchewan. It is on the shores of Pelican Lake, about 80 kilometres (50 mi) north-west of Flin Flon.

== See also ==
- List of Indian reserves in Saskatchewan
