= Minoahchak 74C =

Indian reserve in Saskatchewan, Canada

Coordinates: 51°02′42″N 102°25′00″W

- Indian reserve
- Minoahchak Indian Reserve No. 74C
- Location in Saskatchewan
- First Nation: Zagime Anishinabek
- Country: Canada
- Province: Saskatchewan

Area
  - Total: 408.7 ha (1,010 acres)

Minoahchak 74C is an Indian reserve of the Zagime Anishinabek in Saskatchewan.

== See also ==
- List of Indian reserves in Saskatchewan
