= Flying Dust 105F =

Indian reserve in Saskatchewan, Canada

Coordinates: 54°03′18″N 108°05′46″W

- Indian reserve
- Flying Dust Indian Reserve No. 105F
- Location in Saskatchewan
- First Nation: Flying Dust
- Country: Canada
- Province: Saskatchewan

Area
  - Total: 1,300.1 ha (3,213 acres)

Flying Dust 105F is an Indian reserve of the Flying Dust First Nation in Saskatchewan.

== See also ==
- List of Indian reserves in Saskatchewan
