= Mirond Lake 184E =

Indian reserve in Saskatchewan, Canada

Coordinates: 55°11′41″N 102°48′39″W

- Indian reserve
- Mirond Lake Indian Reserve No. 184E
- Location in Saskatchewan
- First Nation: Peter Ballantyne
- Country: Canada
- Province: Saskatchewan

Area
  - Total: 601.8 ha (1,487 acres)

Mirond Lake 184E is an Indian reserve of the Peter Ballantyne Cree Nation in Saskatchewan. It is 77 kilometres (48 mi) north-west of Flin Flon, on the north-eastern shore of Mirond Lake.

== See also ==
- List of Indian reserves in Saskatchewan
