= Little Black Bear 84SC =

Indian reserve in Saskatchewan, Canada

Coordinates: 51°02′03″N 103°24′32″W

- Indian reserve
- Little Black Bear Indian Reserve No. 84SC
- Location in Saskatchewan
- First Nation: Little Black Bear
- Country: Canada
- Province: Saskatchewan

Area
  - Total: 1,041.7 ha (2,574 acres)

Little Black Bear 84SC is an Indian reserve of the Little Black Bear First Nation in Saskatchewan.

== See also ==
- List of Indian reserves in Saskatchewan
