= Flying Dust 105H =

Indian reserve in Saskatchewan, Canada

Coordinates: 49°52′34″N 102°58′21″W

- Indian reserve
- Flying Dust Indian Reserve No. 105H
- Location in Saskatchewan
- First Nation: Flying Dust
- Country: Canada
- Province: Saskatchewan

Area
  - Total: 126.6 ha (313 acres)

Flying Dust 105H is an Indian reserve of the Flying Dust First Nation in Saskatchewan.

== See also ==
- List of Indian reserves in Saskatchewan
