= Ballantyne River =

River in Saskatchewan, Canada

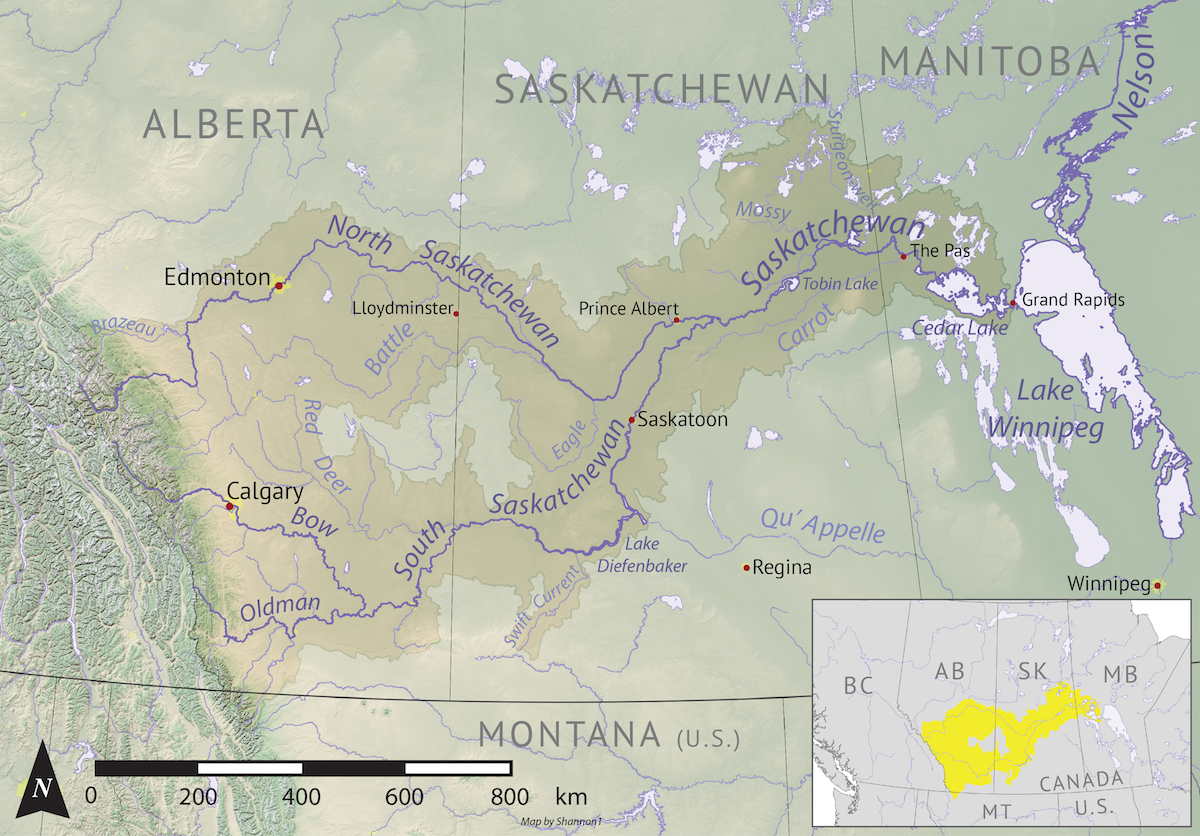
- Map of the Saskatchewan River drainage basin

- Location of river's mouth in Saskatchewan Ballantyne River (Canada)

Location
- Country: Canada
- Province: Saskatchewan

Physical characteristics
- Source: Big Sandy Lake
  - location: Northern Administration District
  - coordinates: 54.4492°N 104.0357°W
  - elevation: 395 m (1,296 ft)
- Mouth: Deschambault Lake
  - location: Muskwaminiwatim 225 Indian reserve
  - coordinates: 54.6225°N 103.7011°W
  - elevation: 324 m (1,063 ft)

Basin features
- River system: Nelson River
- Tributaries
  - left: Bear River

Ballantyne River is a river in the Canadian province of Saskatchewan. The river begins at Big Sandy Lake and flows in a north-easterly direction into Deschambault Lake. The river's tributaries originate in the Cub Hills and the river itself is within the Sturgeon-Weir River drainage basin. Bear River is the largest tributary.

== Description ==
Ballantyne River is in Saskatchewan's Northern Administration District and begins at the eastern shore of Big Sandy Lake. From there, it heads east then north where it crosses Hanson Lake Road and meets up with Bear River. Bear River, Ballantyne River's longest tributary, begins at Heart Lake (which is connected to Little Bear Lake) to the west in the Cub Hills. Ballantyne River continues east and flows into Ballantyne Bay of Deschambault Lake. The final leg of the river forms the southern boundary of the Muskwaminiwatim 225 Indian reserve.

Ballantyne River is within the Sturgeon-Weir River drainage basin. The Sturgeon-Weir River is a tributary of the Saskatchewan River which heads east into Manitoba and is a tributary of the Nelson River.

== See also ==
- List of rivers of Saskatchewan
- Hudson Bay drainage basin
