= Flying Dust 105L =

Indian reserve in Saskatchewan, Canada

Coordinates: 49°48′36″N 102°07′50″W

- Indian reserve
- Flying Dust Indian Reserve No. 105L
- Location in Saskatchewan
- First Nation: Flying Dust
- Country: Canada
- Province: Saskatchewan

Area
  - Total: 127.8 ha (316 acres)

Flying Dust 105L is an Indian reserve of the Flying Dust First Nation in Saskatchewan.

== See also ==
- List of Indian reserves in Saskatchewan
