= Amiskosakahikan 210 =

Indian reserve in Saskatchewan, Canada

Coordinates: 54°26′44″N 102°08′41″W

- Indian reserve
- Amiskosakahikan Indian Reserve No. 210
- Location in Saskatchewan
- First Nation: Peter Ballantyne
- Country: Canada
- Province: Saskatchewan

Area
  - Total: 442.6 ha (1,094 acres)

Amiskosakahikan 210 is an Indian reserve of the Peter Ballantyne Cree Nation in Saskatchewan. It is 11 kilometres southwest of Creighton.

== See also ==
- List of Indian reserves in Saskatchewan
