= Maskikopawiscikosik 229 =

Indian reserve in Saskatchewan, Canada

Coordinates: 55°12′45″N 103°02′49″W

- Indian reserve
- Maskikopawiscikosik Indian Reserve No. 229
- Location in Saskatchewan
- First Nation: Peter Ballantyne
- Country: Canada
- Province: Saskatchewan

Area
  - Total: 180.5 ha (446 acres)

Maskikopawiscikosik 229 is an Indian reserve of the Peter Ballantyne Cree Nation in Saskatchewan.

== See also ==
- List of Indian reserves in Saskatchewan
