= Makwa Lake 129B =

Indian reserve in Saskatchewan, Canada

Coordinates: 54°02′47″N 109°13′05″W

- Indian reserve
- Makwa Lake Indian Reserve No. 129B
- Location in Saskatchewan
- First Nation: Makwa Sahgaiehcan
- Country: Canada
- Province: Saskatchewan

Area
  - Total: 3,596.5 ha (8,887 acres)

Population (2016)
  - Total: 982
  - Density: 27.3/km^{2} (70.7/sq mi)
- Community Well-Being Index: 47

Makwa Lake 129B is an Indian reserve of the Makwa Sahgaiehcan First Nation in Saskatchewan. It is about 95 miles north-west of North Battleford. In the 2016 Canadian Census, it recorded a population of 982 living in 226 of its 444 total private dwellings. In the same year, its Community Well-Being index was calculated at 47 of 100, compared to 58.4 for the average First Nations community and 77.5 for the average non-Indigenous community.

== See also ==
- List of Indian reserves in Saskatchewan
