= Whitecap 94 =

Indian reserve in Saskatchewan, Canada

Coordinates: 51°52′48″N 106°42′59″W

- Indian reserve
- Whitecap Indian Reserve No. 94
- Location in Saskatchewan
- First Nation: Whitecap
- Country: Canada
- Province: Saskatchewan

Area
  - Total: 1,894.5 ha (4,681 acres)

Population (2016)
  - Total: 451
  - Density: 23.8/km^{2} (61.7/sq mi)
- Community Well-Being Index: 73

Whitecap 94 is an Indian reserve of the Whitecap Dakota First Nation in Saskatchewan. It is about 29 kilometres (18 mi) south of Saskatoon, near Dundurn, on the eastern bank of the South Saskatchewan River. In the 2016 Canadian Census, it recorded a population of 451 living in 145 of its 166 total private dwellings. In the same year, its Community Well-Being index was calculated at 73 of 100, compared to 58.4 for the average First Nations community and 77.5 for the average non-Indigenous community.

== See also ==
- List of Indian reserves in Saskatchewan
