= Saskatchewan Highway 967 =

Provincial highway in Saskatchewan, Canada

Highway 967

Route information
- Maintained by Ministry of Highways and Infrastructure
- Length: 0.81 km (0.50 mi; 2,700 ft)

Major junctions
- West end: Sturgeon Weir 205 line in Sturgeon Landing
- East end: Sturgeon Landing Road at the Manitoba/Saskatchewan border

Location
- Country: Canada
- Province: Saskatchewan

Highway system
- Provincial highways in Saskatchewan
← Highway 966	→ Highway 968

Highway 967 is a 0.81-kilometre (0.50 mi) long provincial highway in the Canadian province of Saskatchewan. It runs from Sturgeon Landing to the Manitoba border where it continues east into Manitoba as Namew Lake Road. Namew Lake Road follows the north-eastern shore of Namew Lake before heading east to Manitoba Highway 10. For part of the year, Highway 967 is cut off from the rest of the province and its only connection is into Manitoba.

== See also ==
- Roads in Saskatchewan
- Transportation in Saskatchewan
