= Amisk Lake 184 =

Indian reserve in Saskatchewan, Canada

Coordinates: 54°34′54″N 102°24′54″W

- Indian reserve
- Amisk Lake Indian Reserve No. 184
- Location in Saskatchewan
- First Nation: Peter Ballantyne
- Country: Canada
- Province: Saskatchewan

Area
  - Total: 2,072.8 ha (5,122 acres)

Amisk Lake 184 is an Indian reserve of the Peter Ballantyne Cree Nation in Saskatchewan.

== See also ==
- List of Indian reserves in Saskatchewan
