= Shesheep 74A =

Indian reserve in Saskatchewan, Canada

Coordinates: 50°37′23″N 102°45′33″W

- Indian reserve
- Shesheep Indian Reserve No. 74A
- Location in Saskatchewan
- First Nation: Zagime Anishinabek
- Country: Canada
- Province: Saskatchewan

Area
  - Total: 1,426.4 ha (3,525 acres)

Population (2016)
  - Total: 111
  - Density: 7.78/km^{2} (20.2/sq mi)
- Community Well-Being Index: 81

Shesheep 74A is an Indian reserve of the Zagime Anishinabek in Saskatchewan. It is on the left bank of the Qu'Appelle River, at the west end of Crooked Lake. In the 2016 Canadian Census, it recorded a population of 111 living in 56 of its 179 total private dwellings. In the same year, its Community Well-Being index was calculated at 81 of 100, compared to 58.4 for the average First Nations community and 77.5 for the average non-Indigenous community.

== See also ==
- List of Indian reserves in Saskatchewan
