= Thomas Morin Reserve =

Indian reserve in Saskatchewan, Canada

Coordinates: 54°45′14″N 101°53′56″W

- Indian reserve
- Thomas Morin Indian Reserve
- Location in Saskatchewan
- First Nation: Peter Ballantyne
- Country: Canada
- Province: Saskatchewan

Area
  - Total: 0.2 ha (0.49 acres)

The Thomas Morin Reserve is an Indian reserve of the Peter Ballantyne Cree Nation in Saskatchewan. It is within the city of Flin Flon.

== See also ==
- List of Indian reserves in Saskatchewan
