= Makwa Sahgaiehcan First Nation =

Cree First Nation band government

Makwa Sahgaiehcan is a Cree First Nation band government in Loon Lake, Saskatchewan, Canada. Their reserve is northeast of Lloydminster. The English translation of "Makwa Sahgaiehcan" is from Plains Cree language ᒫᑿ ᓵᑲᐦᐃᑲᐣ, mâkwa sâkahikan, meaning "loon lake". It is also the administrative headquarters of the Eagles Lake band government.

The First Nation has reserved for itself four reserves:

- Makwa Lake 129
- Makwa Lake 129A
- Makwa Lake 129B
- Makwa Lake 129C
