= Makwa Lake 129A =

Indian reserve in Saskatchewan, Canada

Coordinates: 54°02′06″N 109°04′46″W

- Indian reserve
- Makwa Lake Indian Reserve No. 129A
- Location in Saskatchewan
- First Nation: Makwa Sahgaiehcan
- Country: Canada
- Province: Saskatchewan

Area
  - Total: 258.2 ha (638 acres)

Makwa Lake 129A is an Indian reserve of the Makwa Sahgaiehcan First Nation in Saskatchewan. It is about 95 miles north-west of North Battleford.

== See also ==
- List of Indian reserves in Saskatchewan
