= McKay 209 =

Indian reserve in Saskatchewan, Canada

Coordinates: 54°44′14″N 105°36′43″W

- Indian reserve
- McKay Indian Reserve No. 209
- Location in Saskatchewan
- First Nation: Peter Ballantyne
- Country: Canada
- Province: Saskatchewan

Area
  - Total: 1,361.3 ha (3,364 acres)

McKay 209 is an Indian reserve of the Peter Ballantyne Cree Nation in Saskatchewan.

== See also ==
- List of Indian reserves in Saskatchewan
