= Chief Philip Morin 232 =

Indian reserve in Saskatchewan, Canada

Coordinates: 53°11′36″N 105°44′18″W

- Indian reserve
- Chief Philip Morin Indian Reserve No. 232
- Location in Saskatchewan
- First Nation: Peter Ballantyne
- Country: Canada
- Province: Saskatchewan

Area
  - Total: 0.2 ha (0.49 acres)

Chief Philip Morin 232 is an Indian reserve of the Peter Ballantyne Cree Nation in Saskatchewan. It is located inside the city of Prince Albert, making it an urban reserve.

== See also ==
- List of Indian reserves in Saskatchewan
