= Nakiskatowaneek 227 =

Indian reserve in Saskatchewan, Canada

Coordinates: 54°49′56″N 102°46′45″W

- Indian reserve
- Nakiskatowaneek Indian Reserve No. 227
- Location in Saskatchewan
- First Nation: Peter Ballantyne
- Country: Canada
- Province: Saskatchewan

Area
  - Total: 257.5 ha (636 acres)

Nakiskatowaneek 227 is an Indian reserve of the Peter Ballantyne Cree Nation in Saskatchewan. It is at the junction of Highway 106 and Highway 135.

== See also ==
- List of Indian reserves in Saskatchewan
