= Meadow Lake 105C =

Indian reserve in Saskatchewan, Canada

Coordinates: 54°07′46″N 108°25′56″W

- Indian reserve
- Meadow Lake Indian Reserve No. 105C
- Location in Saskatchewan
- First Nation: Flying Dust
- Country: Canada
- Province: Saskatchewan

Area
  - Total: 0.2 ha (0.49 acres)

Meadow Lake 105C is an Indian reserve of the Flying Dust First Nation in Saskatchewan. It is Lots 12, 13, and 14, Block 14, northeast quarter of Section 26, Township 59, Range 17, west of the Third Meridian.

== See also ==
- List of Indian reserves in Saskatchewan
