= Flying Dust 105E =

Indian reserve in Saskatchewan, Canada

Coordinates: 54°10′15″N 108°32′53″W

- Indian reserve
- Flying Dust Indian Reserve No. 105E
- Location in Saskatchewan
- First Nation: Flying Dust
- Country: Canada
- Province: Saskatchewan

Area
  - Total: 437 ha (1,080 acres)

Flying Dust 105E is an Indian reserve of the Flying Dust First Nation in Saskatchewan.

== See also ==
- List of Indian reserves in Saskatchewan
