= Flying Dust 105D =

Indian reserve in Saskatchewan, Canada

Coordinates: 54°09′01″N 108°12′53″W

- Indian reserve
- Flying Dust Indian Reserve No. 105D
- Location in Saskatchewan
- First Nation: Flying Dust
- Country: Canada
- Province: Saskatchewan

Area
  - Total: 2,477.1 ha (6,121 acres)

Flying Dust 105D is an Indian reserve of the Flying Dust First Nation in Saskatchewan.

== See also ==
- List of Indian reserves in Saskatchewan
