= Makwa Lake 129 =

Indian reserve in Saskatchewan, Canada

Coordinates: 54°00′27″N 109°18′31″W

- Indian reserve
- Makwa Lake Indian Reserve No. 129
- Location in Saskatchewan
- First Nation: Makwa Sahgaiehcan
- Country: Canada
- Province: Saskatchewan

Area
  - Total: 1,836 ha (4,540 acres)

Population (2016)
  - Total: 15
  - Density: 0.82/km^{2} (2.1/sq mi)

Makwa Lake 129 is an Indian reserve of the Makwa Sahgaiehcan First Nation in Saskatchewan. It is about 151 kilometres (94 mi) north-west of North Battleford. In the 2016 Canadian Census, it recorded a population of 15 living in 5 of its 5 total private dwellings.

== See also ==
- List of Indian reserves in Saskatchewan
