= Cumberland House Cree Nation 20 =

Indian reserve in Saskatchewan, Canada

Coordinates: 53°56′03″N 102°14′09″W

- Indian reserve
- Cumberland House Cree Nation Indian Reserve No. 20
- Location in Saskatchewan
- First Nation: Cumberland House
- Country: Canada
- Province: Saskatchewan

Area
  - Total: 1,622.8 ha (4,010 acres)

Population (2016)
  - Total: 795
  - Density: 49.0/km^{2} (127/sq mi)
- Community Well-Being Index: 51

Cumberland House Cree Nation 20 is an Indian reserve of the Cumberland House Cree Nation in Saskatchewan. The reserve is on Cumberland Island in the Saskatchewan River Delta, about 96 kilometres (60 mi) south-west of Flin Flon.

In the 2016 Canadian Census, it recorded a population of 795 living in 232 of its 235 total private dwellings. In the same year, its Community Well-Being index was calculated at 51 of 100, compared to 58.4 for the average First Nations community and 77.5 for the average non-Indigenous community.

== See also ==
- List of Indian reserves in Saskatchewan
