= Kistapinânihk 231 =

Indian reserve in Saskatchewan, Canada

Coordinates: 53°10′54″N 105°45′42″W

- Indian reserve
- Kistapinânihk Indian Reserve No. 231
- Location in Saskatchewan
- First Nation: Peter Ballantyne
- Country: Canada
- Province: Saskatchewan

Area
  - Total: 0.9 ha (2.2 acres)

Kistapinânihk 231 is an Indian reserve of the Peter Ballantyne Cree Nation in Saskatchewan. It is in the city of Prince Albert.

== See also ==
- List of Indian reserves in Saskatchewan
