= Budd's Point 20D =

Indian reserve in Saskatchewan, Canada

Coordinates: 53°59′14″N 102°07′24″W

- Indian reserve
- Budd's Point Indian Reserve No. 20D
- Location in Saskatchewan
- First Nation: Cumberland House
- Country: Canada
- Province: Saskatchewan

Area
  - Total: 259 ha (640 acres)

Budd's Point 20D is an Indian reserve of the Cumberland House Cree Nation in Saskatchewan. It is 85 kilometres south of Flin Flon.

== See also ==
- List of Indian reserves in Saskatchewan
