= Wapaskokimaw 202 =

Indian reserve in Saskatchewan, Canada

Coordinates: 55°32′11″N 102°18′48″W

- Indian reserve
- Wapaskokimaw Indian Reserve No. 202
- Location in Saskatchewan
- First Nation: Peter Ballantyne
- Country: Canada
- Province: Saskatchewan

Area
  - Total: 64.5 ha (159 acres)

Wapaskokimaw 202 is an Indian reserve of the Peter Ballantyne Cree Nation in Saskatchewan. The reserve is about 90 kilometres (56 mi) north of Creighton on the eastern shore of Wasawakasik Lake. Wasawakasik Lake is a lake along the course of the Churchill River.

== See also ==
- List of Indian reserves in Saskatchewan
