= Sturgeon Weir 184F =

Indian reserve in Saskatchewan, Canada

Coordinates: 54°17′29″N 101°51′18″W

- Indian reserve
- Sturgeon Weir Indian Reserve No. 184F
- Location in Saskatchewan
- First Nation: Peter Ballantyne
- Country: Canada
- Province: Saskatchewan

Area
  - Total: 2,329.4 ha (5,756 acres)

Population (2016)
  - Total: 81
  - Density: 3.5/km^{2} (9.0/sq mi)
- Community Well-Being Index: 51

Sturgeon Weir 184F is an Indian reserve of the Peter Ballantyne Cree Nation in Saskatchewan. It is adjacent to Sturgeon Weir 205 and about 55 kilometres (34 mi) south-east of Flin Flon. In the 2016 Canadian Census, it recorded a population of 81 living in 20 of its 26 total private dwellings. In the same year, its Community Well-Being index was calculated at 51 of 100, compared to 58.4 for the average First Nations community and 77.5 for the average non-Indigenous community.

== See also ==
- List of Indian reserves in Saskatchewan
