= Kimosom Pwatinahk 203 =

Indian reserve in Saskatchewan, Canada

Coordinates: 54°54′26″N 103°21′14″W

- Indian reserve
- Kimosom Pwatinahk Indian Reserve No. 203
- Location in Saskatchewan
- First Nation: Peter Ballantyne
- Country: Canada
- Province: Saskatchewan

Area
  - Total: 766.3 ha (1,894 acres)

Population (2016)
  - Total: 1,061
  - Density: 138.5/km^{2} (358.6/sq mi)
- Community Well-Being Index: 40

Kimosom Pwatinahk 203 is an Indian reserve of the Peter Ballantyne Cree Nation in Saskatchewan. It is on the south shore of the northerly part of Deschambault Lake. In the 2016 Canadian Census, it recorded a population of 1061 living in 199 of its 221 total private dwellings. In the same year, its Community Well-Being index was calculated at 40 of 100, compared to 58.4 for the average First Nations community and 77.5 for the average non-Indigenous community.

== See also ==
- List of Indian reserves in Saskatchewan
