= Deschambault Lake, Saskatchewan =

Community in Saskatchewan, Canada

Deschambault Lake ᑭᒧᓲᒼ-ᑇᑎᓈᕽ kimosôm-pwâtinâhk Kimosom Pwatinahk 203
- Aerial photograph of Deschambault Lake

- Deschambault Lake in Saskatchewan Deschambault Lake (Canada)
- Coordinates: 54°55′00″N 103°22′01″W
- Country: Canada
- Province: Saskatchewan

Government
  - Type: First Nations Band government
  - MLA: Cumberland
  - MP: Desnethé—Missinippi—Churchill River

Area
  - Total: 8.04 km^{2} (3.10 sq mi)

Population (2011)
  - Total: 1,194
  - Density: 148.5/km^{2} (385/sq mi)
- Time zone: UTC−6 (Central Standard Time)
- Area code: 306
- Highways: Hwy 106, Hwy 911

Deschambault Lake (Kimosom Pwatinahk 203) (Woods Cree: ᑭᒧᓲᒼ-ᑇᑎᓈᕽ, romanized: kimosôm-pwâtinâhk), located in the Canadian province of Saskatchewan, is a small community on the shore of Deschambault Lake. The nearest city, Flin Flon, Manitoba, is 140 kilometres (90 mi) east on Highway 106. The community is at the terminus of the 31-kilometre-long (19 mi) Highway 911. Commercial fishing is the main source of income, while other employers include the Kistapiskaw School (K–12) and the local health clinic. It is part of the Peter Ballantyne Cree Nation (PBCN).

== Demographics ==
In the 2021 Census of Population conducted by Statistics Canada, Kimosom Pwatinahk 203 (Deschambault Lake) had a population of 840 living in 159 of its 166 total private dwellings, a change of −19.7% from its 2016 population of 1,046. With a land area of 1.4 km^{2} (0.54 sq mi), it had a population density of 600.0/km^{2} (1,554.0/sq mi) in 2021.

== Profile ==
The community of Deschambault Lake is 340 kilometres (210 mi) north-east of Prince Albert and lies 30 kilometres (19 mi) by gravel off the paved Hanson Lake Road (Highway 106). The closest larger centres are Creighton, and Flin Flon located about 140 kilometres (87 mi) to the east. Most residents of Deschambault regularly travel to these centres for shopping, medical and dental appointments, and recreation activities.

The industries in the community include crafts, trapping, fishing, rice harvesting, and sawmill. People in the community enjoy skating, hockey, snowmobiling, cross-country skiing, boating, camping, and fishing. The Kistapiskaw School offers kindergarten to grade twelve. Two churches are attended in the community, Anglican and Evangelical. There is an ice arena, a restaurant, and two confectionery stores (one with a gas bar).

There is a Royal Canadian Mounted Police detachment with four officers living in the community.

=== Health care ===
The Deschambault Lake Health Centre is open Monday to Friday for public health programs and treatment services, but also provides 24-hour emergency care. Ambulance service comes from Pelican Narrows and will meet a medivac team from the community at the highway junction.

Doctors from Flin Flon visit two days per week. The centre is staffed by four nurses including the nurse in charge. The nurses work with community health staff to deliver all community health programs and treatments. A home-care nurse and home-health aides work to deliver home and community care. There are a holistic health coordinator and holistic health workers whose focus is mental health and addictions. A full-time dental therapist offers services to the community and school from the clinic. The nursing staff and other professionals are provided with furnished accommodations.

== See also ==
- List of Indian reserves in Saskatchewan
- List of communities in Saskatchewan
