= Southend 200 =

Indian reserve in Saskatchewan, Canada

Coordinates: 56°19′53″N 103°11′58″W

- Indian reserve
- Southend Indian Reserve No. 200
- Location in Saskatchewan
- First Nation: Peter Ballantyne
- Country: Canada
- Province: Saskatchewan

Area
  - Total: 4,219.1 ha (10,426 acres)

Population (2016)
  - Total: 917
  - Density: 21.7/km^{2} (56.3/sq mi)
- Community Well-Being Index: 43

Southend 200 is an Indian reserve of the Peter Ballantyne Cree Nation in Saskatchewan about 402 kilometres (250 mi) north-east of Prince Albert. The reserve is at the southern end of Reindeer Lake and is part of the community of Southend.

In the 2016 Canadian Census, it recorded a population of 917 living in 177 of its 206 total private dwellings. In the same year, its Community Well-Being index was calculated at 43 of 100, compared to 58.4 for the average First Nations community and 77.5 for the average non-Indigenous community.

== See also ==
- List of Indian reserves in Saskatchewan
- Southend 200A
