= Peter Ballantyne Cree Nation =

First Nation in Saskatchewan, Canada

- Band No. 355
- ᐊᓯᓃᐢᑳᐏᑎᓂᐘᐠ asinîskâwitiniwak
- People: Cree
- Treaty: Treaty 6
- Headquarters: Prince Albert
- Province: Saskatchewan

Land
- Main reserve: Pelican Narrows 184B
- Reserves: List: Amisk Lake 184; Amiskosakahikan 210; Birch Portage 184A; Chief Joseph Custer; Chief Philip Morin 232; Kimosom Pwatinahk 203; Kinoosao-Thomas Clark 204; Kipahigan Sakihikan 222; Kiskaciwan 208; Kistapinan 211; Kistapinânihk 231; Manawanstawayak 230; Maskikopawiscikosik 229; McKay 209; Mirond Lake 184E; Mistahi Wasahk 209; Mistik; Muskwaminiwatim 225; Nakiskatowaneek 227; Nemekus Sakahikan 221; Northern Lights 220; Pelican Narrows 206; Pisiwiminiwatim 207; Sandy Narrows 184C; Sokatisewin Sakahikan 224; Southend 200; Southend 200A; Sturgeon Weir 184F; Sturgeon Weir 205; Thomas Morin; Wapaskokimaw 202; Waskwaynikapik 228; Waskwiatik Sakihikan 223; Woody Lake 184D
- Land area: 375.764 km^{2} (145.083 sq mi)

Population (2025)
- On reserve: 7620
- On other land: 415
- Off reserve: 5039
- Total population: 13074

Government
- Chief: Peter A. Beatty

Tribal Council
- Prince Albert Grand Council

Website
- peterballantyne.ca

The Peter Ballantyne Cree Nation (Rocky Cree: ᐊᓯᓃᐢᑳᐏᑎᓂᐘᐠ, Asinîskâwitiniwak) is a Woodland Cree First Nation in northern Saskatchewan consisting of eight communities: Denare Beach (Amisk Lake), Deschambault Lake, Kinoosao, Pelican Narrows, Prince Albert (Kiskaciwan), Sandy Bay, Southend and Sturgeon Landing. The administrative centre of Peter Ballantyne Cree Nation is Pelican Narrows and the centralized government of the First Nation is located in Prince Albert, Saskatchewan.

== Government ==
Peter Ballantyne Cree Nation is governed by an Indian Act Chief and Council, elected for three-year terms under the 2014 Election Code.

In 2003 and 2004, work in amending the Election Act was undertaken by staff and a Cree speaking lawyer. PBCN membership consultations were done through utilization of community committees and staff for many months. Membership at the time updated the 1994 Band Custom Election Act; however, the proposed 2004 Election Act did not pass the referendum process with two communities rejecting the new election act.

In August 2013, Chief and Council acquired funding from Indian Northern Affairs of Canada to begin the process again of amending the existing Election Act of 1994. Due to limited funding from the INAC, Chief and Council had suggested the work done in 2003 and 2004 be revisited and taken back to the membership for further consultations and amendments.

The work to amend the 1994 Election Act started in early September 2013. The first round of community meetings with the membership were completed on October 23, 2013. It was expected that the process would be fast-paced in order to meet the amendment deadline date. A tentative date to hold a band wide referendum was slated for January 30, or early February 2014.

The governance workers, Randy Clarke, Loretta Ballantyne, the band lawyer and other staff used input collected from technology such as surveys and the PBCN website as well as the community meetings to gather input from communities. After this process, the first draft of the 2014 Election Act was produced after it had been reviewed by the PBCN lawyer. The last round of consultations took place early December 2013 and it was passed in 2014 through a referendum. It was the membership of PBCN who decided on what amendments would be included in the election code, therefore, it was easily passed by the people.

There are 14 elected councillors, two each from Sandy Bay, Southend, and Deschambault Lake, five from Pelican Narrows, and one each from Denare Beach (Amisk Lake), Prince Albert (Kiskaciwan), and Sturgeon Landing.

=== Past leaders ===
- 2024–2027: Peter A. Beatty
- 2021–2024: Karen Bird
- 2013–2021: Peter A. Beatty
- 2007–2013: Darrell McCallum
- 2005–2007: Harold Linklater
- 2001–2005: Ronald Michel
- 1999–2001: Susan (Linklater) Custer
- 1985–1999: Ronald Michel
- 1979–1985: Joseph Custer
- 1975–1979: Phillip Morin
- 1973–1975: Albert Ratt
- 1971–1973: Arthur Morin
- 1969–1971: Simon Linklater
- 1958–1969: Peter Linklater
- 1956–1957: Simon Linklater
- 1954–1956: vacant
- 1948–1954: Simon Linklater
- 1939–1948: Solomon Merasty
- 1930–1939: Joe Highway
- 1922–1930: Cornelius Ballantyne (Bear)
- 1911–1922: Peter Ballantyne

== Indian reserves ==
Peter Ballantyne Cree Nation has reserved for itself several reserves:

- Amisk Lake 184 (Cree: ᐊᒥᐢᑯ ᓵᑲᐦᐃᑲᐣ, amisko-sâkahikan)
- Amiskosakahikan 210 (Cree: ᐊᒥᐢᑯ ᓵᑲᐦᐃᑲᐣ, amisko-sâkahikan)
- Birch Portage 184A (Cree: ᐘᐢᑿᐩ ᐅᓂᑳᐦᐱᕽ, waskway-onikâhpihk)
- Chief Joseph Custer
- Chief Philip Morin 232
- Denare Beach (settlement) (Cree: ᒨᓇᐦᐃᓲᓂᔮᐚᓂᕽ, mônahisôniyâwânihk)
- Deschambault Lake (settlement) (Cree: ᑭᒧᓲᒼ ᑇᑎᓈᕽ, kimosôm pwâtinâhk)
- Kimosom Pwatinahk 203
- Kinoosao-Thomas Clark 204 (Cree: ᑭᓄᓭᐤ, kinosêw)
- Kipahigan Sakahikan 222 (Cree: ᑭᐸᐦᐃᑲᐣ ᓵᑲᐦᐃᑲᐣ, kipahikan-sâkahikan)
- Kiskaciwan 208 (Cree: ᑮᐢᑲᒋᐚᐣ, kîskaciwân)
- Kistapinan 211 (Cree: ᑭᐢᑕᐱᓈᐣ, kistapinân)
- Kistapinanihk 231 (Cree: ᑭᐢᑕᐱᓈᓂᕽ, kistapinânihk) (Urban Reserve in Prince Albert)
- Manawanstawayak 230 (Cree: ᒪᓈᐚᐣᐢᑕᐚᔭᐠ, manâwânstawâyak
- Maskikopawiscikosik 229 (Cree: ᒪᐢᑭᐦᑭᐩ ᐹᐏᐢᒋᑯᓯᕽ, maskihkiy-pâwiscikosihk
- McKay 209
- Mirond Lake 184E
- Mistahi Wasahk 209 (Cree: ᒥᐢᑕᐦᐃ ᐚᓵᕽ, mistahi wâsâhk)
- Mistik (Cree: ᒥᐢᑎᐠ, mistik)
- Muskwaminiwatim 225 (Cree: ᒪᐢᑿᒥᓂᐊᐧᑎᒼ, maskwaminiwatim)
- Nakiskatowaneek 227 (Cree: ᓇᑭᐢᑳᑐᐏᓂᕽ, nakiskâtowinihk)
- Nemekus Sakahikan 221 (Cree: ᓃᒣᑲᐢ ᓵᑲᐦᐃᑲᐣ, nîmêkas-sâkahikan)
- Northern Lights 220 (Urban Reserve in Prince Albert)
- Pelican Narrows 184B (Cree: ᐅᐹᐘᐦᑯᓯᒋᑲᓂᕽ, opâwahkosicikanihk)
- Pelican Narrows 206 (Cree: ᐅᐹᐘᐦᑯᓯᒋᑲᓂᕽ, opâwahkosicikanihk)
- Pisiwiminiwatim 207 (Cree: ᐲᓯᒥᓂᐊᐧᑎᒼ, pîsiminiwatim)
- Sandy Bay (settlement) (Cree: ᐚᐸᐢᑯᑭᒫᐤ, wâpaskokimâw)
- Sandy Narrows 184C
- Sokatisewin Sakahikan 224 (Cree: ᓰᐦᑲᑎᓭᐏᐣ ᓵᑲᐦᐃᑲᐣ, sîhkatisewin-sâkahikan)
- Southend 200 (Cree: ᐘᐹᑎᑿᒋᐘᓄᕽ, wapâtikwaciwanohk)
- Southend 200A (Cree: ᐘᐹᑎᑿᒋᐘᓄᕽ, wapâtikwaciwanohk)
- Sturgeon Landing (Settlement) (Cree: ᓇᒣᐤ ᓰᐱᐩ, namêw-sîpiy)
- Sturgeon Weir 184F (Cree: ᓇᒣᐤ ᓰᐱᐩ, namêw-sîpiy)
- Sturgeon Weir 205 (Cree: ᓇᒣᐤ ᓰᐱᐩ, namêw-sîpiy)
- Thomas Morin
- Wapaskokimaw 202 (Cree: ᐚᐸᐢᑯᑭᒫᐤ, wâpaskokimâw)
- Waskwaynikapik 228 (Cree: ᐘᐢᑿᐩ ᐅᓂᑳᐦᐱᕽ, waskway-onikâhpihk)
- Waskwiatik Sakahikan 223 (Cree: ᐘᐢᑿᔮᐦᑎᐠ ᓵᑲᐦᐃᑲᐣ, waskwayâhtik-sâkahikan)
- Woody Lake 184D

== Notable people ==
- Rick Harp, co-founder and president of the INDIGENA Creative Group; former host/producer with the Aboriginal Peoples Television Network (APTN); set up mediaINDIGENA.com (an interactive, multimedia magazine dedicated to Indigenous news, views and creative expression); served as artistic director for the Winnipeg Aboriginal Film Festival.
- Gary Merasty from Pelican Narrows, former MP
- Dr. Bonita Beatty from Deschambault Lake
- Judge Gerald M. Morin, the first Cree-speaking indigenous person to be appointed as a judge to the Provincial Court of Saskatchewan
- Cara Merasty from Pelican Narrows; first Cree-speaking female lawyer from the PBCN

== See also ==
- List of Indian reserves in Saskatchewan
