= Pine Bluff 20A =

Indian reserve in Saskatchewan, Canada

Coordinates: 54°06′41″N 102°51′12″W

- Indian reserve
- Pine Bluff Indian Reserve No. 20A
- Location in Saskatchewan
- First Nation: Cumberland House
- Country: Canada
- Province: Saskatchewan

Area
  - Total: 25.5 ha (63 acres)

Pine Bluff 20A is an Indian reserve of the Cumberland House Cree Nation in Saskatchewan. It is about 97 kilometres (60 mi) south-west of Flin Flon, Manitoba, and on the north shore of the Saskatchewan River in the Saskatchewan River Delta.

== See also ==
- List of Indian reserves in Saskatchewan
