= Pine Bluff 20B =

Indian reserve in Saskatchewan, Canada

Coordinates: 54°06′24″N 102°50′17″W

- Indian reserve
- Pine Bluff Indian Reserve No. 20B
- Location in Saskatchewan
- First Nation: Cumberland House
- Country: Canada
- Province: Saskatchewan

Area
  - Total: 143.4 ha (354 acres)

Pine Bluff 20B is an Indian reserve of the Cumberland House Cree Nation in Saskatchewan. It is about 60 kilometres (37 mi) south-west of Flin Flon, and on the north shore of the Saskatchewan River in the Saskatchewan River Delta.

== See also ==
- List of Indian reserves in Saskatchewan
