= Southend 200A =

Indian reserve in Saskatchewan, Canada

Coordinates: 56°19′11″N 103°15′50″W

- Indian reserve
- Southend Indian Reserve No. 200A
- Location in Saskatchewan
- First Nation: Peter Ballantyne
- Country: Canada
- Province: Saskatchewan

Area
  - Total: 278 ha (690 acres)

Population (2016)
  - Total: 128
  - Density: 46.0/km^{2} (119/sq mi)
- Community Well-Being Index: 49

Southend 200A is an Indian reserve of the Peter Ballantyne Cree Nation in Saskatchewan. It is adjacent to the west side of Southend 200. In the 2016 Canadian Census, it recorded a population of 128 living in 30 of its 37 total private dwellings. In the same year, its Community Well-Being index was calculated at 49 out of 100, compared to 58.4 for the average First Nations community and 77.5 for the average non-Indigenous community.

== See also ==
- List of communities in Saskatchewan
