= Yellow Quill First Nation =

Saulteaux band government in Saskatchewan, Canada

Coordinates: 52°21′14″N 103°39′43″W

Yellow Quill First Nation (Ojibwe: Ozaawiigwanong) (formerly Nut Lake Band of Saulteaux) is a Saulteaux First Nation band government in Saskatchewan, Canada. Their reserve is twenty kilometres northwest of Kelvington. The Yellow Quill First Nation is a signatory of Treaty No. 4, which was signed by Chief Yellow-quill on August 24, 1876.

Total registered population in October 2007, was 2,522, of which the on-reserve population was 800+ members, and off-reserve population was 1600+ members. The First Nation is a member of the Saskatoon Tribal Council and have their urban offices in Saskatoon as well as their Tribal Council offices.

== History ==
The First Nation was originally part of the Yellow-quill Saulteaux Band, a Treaty Band named after a Treaty 4 signatory Chief Ošāwaškokwanēpi, whose name means "Green/Blue-quill." However, due to "š" merging with "s" in Nakawēmowin (Saulteaux language), this led to a mistranslation of his name as "Yellow-quill"—"yellow" being osāw-, while "green/blue" being ošāwaško- (or osāwasko- in Saulteaux). Soon after the death of Chief Ošāwaškokwanēpi, the Band divided into three groups, of which the central division about Nut Lake became the Nut Lake Band of Saulteaux, located on the Nut Lake Indian Reserve. In 1989, the Band changed their name to "Yellowquill"—one word—in honour the founding chief; however, when their post office opened in 1993, it was named as "Yellow Quill"—two words.

The flag of the Yellow Quill First Nation.

== Reserves ==
The First Nation have reserved for themselves four reserves:

- 5,858.8 hectares (14,477 acres) Yellowquill Indian Reserve 90 (formerly Nut Lake Indian Reserve 90), which serves as their main Reserve, containing the community of Yellow Quill.
- 64.8 hectares (160 acres) Yellow Quill Indian Reserve 90-8
- 195 hectares (480 acres) Yellow Quill Indian Reserve 90-18
- 37.1 hectares (92 acres) Treaty Four Reserve Grounds 77, which is shared with 32 other First Nations.

In addition, there are 17,000 acres (69 km^{2}) in newly acquired Treaty Land Entitlement lands.

== Governance ==
Yellow Quill have an elected tribal council consisting of a chief and seven councillors. The current council for the three-year-long electoral term ending on November 26, 2026 consists of Chief John Machiskinic and Councilors Terry Moose, Kashtin Nashacappo, Brandon Peequaquat, Charlene Peequaquat, Erin Poochay, Eric Squirrel, and Clarissa Whitehead.

== Services ==
Yellow Quill operates Yellow Quill Health Centre, Nawigizigweyas School (K-12), Yellow Quill Daycare, Robert Neapetung Memorial Water Treatment Plant, Yellow Quill Store, and the Band Office, all of which are on reserve.
