= Division No. 1, Saskatchewan =

Census division in Canada

Coordinates: 49°08′24″N 103°00′36″W

Division No. 1
- Census division in Saskatchewan
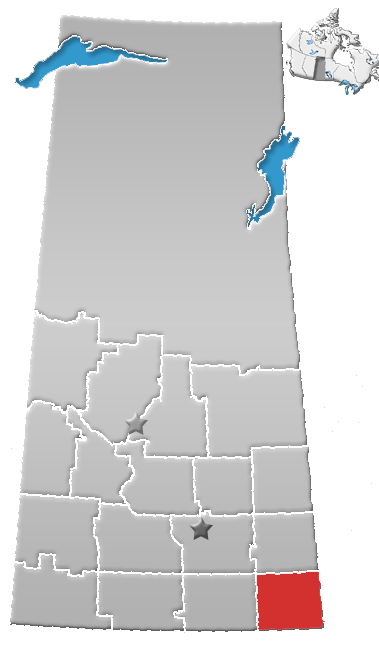
- Country: Canada
- Province: Saskatchewan

Area
  - Total: 14,998.19 km^{2} (5,790.83 sq mi)
- As of 2016

Population (2016)
  - Total: 31,766
  - Density: 2.1180/km^{2} (5.4856/sq mi)

Division No. 1 is one of eighteen census divisions in the province of Saskatchewan, Canada, as defined by Statistics Canada. It is located in the southeast corner of the province, bordering Manitoba and North Dakota. The most populous community in this division is Estevan.

== Demographics ==
In the 2021 Census of Population conducted by Statistics Canada, Division No. 1 had a population of 30,351 living in 12,565 of its 15,608 total private dwellings, a change of −4.5% from its 2016 population of 31,766. With a land area of 14,654.35 km^{2} (5,658.08 sq mi), it had a population density of 2.1/km^{2} (5.4/sq mi) in 2021.

Knowledge of languages in Division No. 1 (1991−2021)
Language	2021		2011		2001		1991	
Language	Pop.	%	Pop.	%	Pop.	%	Pop.	%
English	29,770	99.9%	30,815	99.77%	29,740	99.87%	31,750	99.94%
Tagalog	1,160	3.89%	170	0.55%	10	0.03%	35	0.11%
French	1,045	3.51%	1,185	3.84%	1,570	5.27%	1,705	5.37%
German (Note: Combined responses of the High German languages, including Standard German, Pennsylvania German, Swiss German, and Yiddish.)	200	0.67%	385	1.25%	425	1.43%	805	2.53%
Ukrainian	140	0.47%	105	0.34%	185	0.62%	275	0.87%
Spanish	135	0.45%	50	0.16%	90	0.3%	35	0.11%
Hindustani (Note: Combined responses of Hindi and Urdu as they form mutually intelligible registers of the Hindustani language.)	120	0.4%	30	0.1%	0	0%	35	0.11%
Russian	105	0.35%	160	0.52%	0	0%	20	0.06%
Chinese (Note: Combined responses of the Chinese languages, including Mandarin, Cantonese, Min Nan, Hakka, Wu (Shanghainese), Min Dong, Chinese, n.o.s., and Chinese languages, n.i.e..)	80	0.27%	50	0.16%	35	0.12%	15	0.05%
Cree (Note: Combined responses of the Cree-Innu languages, previously categorized under "Cree" in past censuses.)	50	0.17%	65	0.21%	95	0.32%	125	0.39%
Punjabi	45	0.15%	0	0%	10	0.03%	0	0%
Arabic	35	0.12%	0	0%	0	0%	10	0.03%
Dutch	25	0.08%	45	0.15%	35	0.12%	75	0.24%
Hungarian	15	0.05%	25	0.08%	120	0.4%	130	0.41%
Italian	15	0.05%	0	0%	10	0.03%	10	0.03%
Vietnamese	10	0.03%	0	0%	30	0.1%	0	0%
Persian (Note: Combined responses of Iranian Persian, Dari, and Persian (Farsi), n.o.s., as they form mutually intelligible registers of the Persian language)	10	0.03%	0	0%	0	0%	0	0%
Polish	0	0%	0	0%	15	0.05%	50	0.16%
Portuguese	0	0%	0	0%	20	0.07%	0	0%
Greek	0	0%	0	0%	10	0.03%	10	0.03%
Total responses	29,800	98.18%	30,790	98.27%	29,780	98.49%	31,770	98.72%
Total population	30,351	100%	31,333	100%	30,238	100%	32,181	100%

== Census subdivisions ==
The following census subdivisions (municipalities or municipal equivalents) are located within Saskatchewan's Division No. 1.

=== Cities ===
- Estevan

=== Towns ===
- Alameda
- Arcola
- Bienfait
- Carlyle
- Carnduff
- Lampman
- Oxbow
- Redvers
- Stoughton
- Wawota

=== Villages ===
- Alida
- Carievale
- Fairlight
- Forget
- Frobisher
- Gainsborough
- Glen Ewen
- Heward
- Kennedy
- Kenosee Lake
- Kisbey
- Manor
- Maryfield
- North Portal
- Roche Percee
- Storthoaks

=== Rural municipalities ===
- RM No. 1 Argyle
- RM No. 2 Mount Pleasant
- RM No. 3 Enniskillen
- RM No. 4 Coalfields
- RM No. 5 Estevan
- RM No. 31 Storthoaks
- RM No. 32 Reciprocity
- RM No. 33 Moose Creek
- RM No. 34 Browning
- RM No. 35 Benson
- RM No. 61 Antler
- RM No. 63 Moose Mountain
- RM No. 64 Brock
- RM No. 65 Tecumseh
- RM No. 91 Maryfield
- RM No. 92 Walpole
- RM No. 93 Wawken
- RM No. 94 Hazelwood
- RM No. 95 Golden West

=== Indian reserves ===
- Ocean Man First Nation
  - Ocean Man 69
  - Ocean Man 69A
  - Ocean Man 69B
  - Ocean Man 69C
  - Ocean Man 69E
  - Ocean Man 69F
  - Ocean Man 69G
  - Ocean Man 69H
  - Ocean Man 69I
- Pheasant Rump Nakota First Nation
  - Pheasant Rump 68
- White Bear First Nation
  - White Bear 70

== See also ==
- List of census divisions of Saskatchewan
- List of communities in Saskatchewan
