= List of Canadian tornadoes in 2025 =

Canadian tornadoes of 2025
- Timespan: April 12 – September 5
- Maximum rated tornado: EF2 tornado: 19 tornadoes on 12 different days
- Tornadoes: 92
- Fatalities: 0

This page documents all tornadoes confirmed by Environment Canada and the University of Western Ontario's Northern Tornadoes Project (NTP) in Canada throughout 2025.

== Background ==
Canada is one of the most tornado-prone countries on the planet, averaging 60 per year. While most of these are typically brief and weak, some can be violent and very destructive. Tornadoes in Canada most often occur in the Prairies, southern Ontario, and southern Quebec, where the typical tornado season occurs in the summer months.

Data on Canadian tornadoes, in addition to other weather phenomena such as downbursts, is collected by the Northern Tornadoes Project (NTP). The number of recorded tornadoes in Canada has increased significantly in recent years due to their work. In late 2025, an AI tool was introduced to help identify tornadoes that touch down in the remote forests of Canada. The NTP surveys and rates tornadoes and other wind events that occur in Canada; they are rated using a modified version of the Enhanced Fujita Scale (EF-Scale) known as the Canadian Enhanced Fujita Scale (sometimes abbreviated as the CEF-Scale). (Note: All tornado ratings given by the NTP use the Canadian EF-Scale, even if it is shown as "EF" rather than "CEF".)

== Season summary ==
The 2025 Canadian tornado season began with a weak landspout tornado in mid-April; only weak tornadoes touched down from then to mid-June. From June 19—22, a destructive storm system swept across the Northern United States and parts of Canada. The system produced 12 tornadoes across Saskatchewan, including two EF2-rated tornadoes. On July 12, three EF2 tornadoes caused significant forest damage in northwestern Ontario. Severe storms struck Saskatchewan and Alberta on August 20, producing several strong downbursts and one weak tornado.

2025 Tornado Strengths
EFU (Note: The NTP rating for a torndao that does no known damage is EF0-default, which is equivalent to EFU on the American EF Scale.)	EF0	EF1	EF2	EF3	EF4	EF5
22	15	36	19	0	0	0

== April ==
=== April 12 event ===
List of confirmed tornadoes – Saturday, April 12, 2025 (Note: All dates are based on the local time zone where the tornado touched down; however, all times are in Coordinated Universal Time for consistency.)
EF#	Location	Region	Province	Start coord.	Time (UTC)	Path length	Max. width
EFU	N of Rolling Hills	Newell	AB	50.26°N 111.82°W	23:22	0.76 km (0.47 mi)	50 m (55 yd)
EFU	A weak landspout tornado was recorded, tracking through croplands. No damage was reported.						

=== April 29 event ===
List of confirmed tornadoes – Tuesday, April 29, 2025
EF#	Location	Region	Province	Start coord.	Time (UTC)	Path length	Max. width
EF1	NE of Dorval-Lodge	Abitibi-Témiscamingue	QC	47.4940°N 76.9706°W	18:45	2.91 km (1.81 mi)	160 m (170 yd)
EF1	Satellite imagery showed tornado damage paths through forested areas. Minor downburst damage was also identified in the area.						
EF1	E of Luksville	Outaouais	QC	45.5582°N 75.9556°W	21:45	2.93 km (1.82 mi)	210 m (230 yd)
EF1	Satellite imagery showed tornado damage paths through forested areas.						
EF1	N of Saint-Zénon	Lanaudière	QC	46.6161°N 73.8850°W	23:30	6.74 km (4.19 mi)	600 m (660 yd)
EF1	A tornado damaged roofs and trees and destroyed a barn.						
EF1	SW of La Tuque	Mauricie	QC	47.1376°N 73.0523°W	23:30	2.93 km (1.82 mi)	240 m (260 yd)
EF1	Satellite imagery showed tornado damage paths through forested areas.						

=== April 30 event ===
List of confirmed tornadoes – Wednesday, April 30, 2025
EF#	Location	Region	Province	Start coord.	Time (UTC)	Path length	Max. width
EFU	SE of Tourond	Eastman	MB	49.53°N 96.95°W	23:03	2.90 km (1.80 mi)	Unknown
EFU	A weak landspout tornado was recorded. No damage was reported; its path length was estimated by a witness.						

== May ==
=== May 15 event ===
List of confirmed tornadoes – Thursday, May 15, 2025
EF#	Location	Region	Province	Start coord.	Time (UTC)	Path length	Max. width
EFU	S of Sperling	Pembina Valley	MB	49.46°N 97.73°W	23:05	Unknown	Unknown
EFU	A weak landspout tornado was recorded. No damage was reported.						

=== May 16 event ===
List of confirmed tornadoes – Friday, May 16, 2025
EF#	Location	Region	Province	Start coord.	Time (UTC)	Path length	Max. width
EF0	S of Lakeside	Oxford	ON	43.1618°N 81.0049°W	07:00	3.60 km (2.24 mi)	160 m (170 yd)
EF0	A tornado damaged trees and a power pole northwest of Woodstock.						

=== May 21 event ===
List of confirmed tornadoes – Wednesday, May 21, 2025
EF#	Location	Region	Province	Start coord.	Time (UTC)	Path length	Max. width
EFU	NE of Vanderhoof	Interior Plateau	BC	54.037°N 123.940°W	20:34	Unknown	Unknown
EFU	A weak landspout tornado was recorded. No damage was reported.						

=== May 26 event ===
List of confirmed tornadoes – Monday, May 26, 2025
EF#	Location	Region	Province	Start coord.	Time (UTC)	Path length	Max. width
EF1	S of Atmore to Rossian	Northern Alberta	AB	54.8007°N 112.5610°W	01:00	21.20 km (13.17 mi)	300 m (330 yd)
EF1	A tornado damaged homes and trees along a long but somewhat narrow path. The roof of one home was partially removed.						
EF1	Avenir area	Northern Alberta	AB	54.9945°N 112.2772°W	01:25	6.43 km (4.00 mi)	370 m (400 yd)
EF1	This tornado started near the end of the previous tornado's path, uprooting many trees along its path.						

== June ==
=== June 2 event ===
List of confirmed tornadoes – Monday, June 2, 2025
EF#	Location	Region	Province	Start coord.	Time (UTC)	Path length	Max. width
EFU	S of Cut Knife (1st tornado)	Cut Knife	SK	52.68°N 109.06°W	21:30	Unknown	Unknown
EFU	A weak landspout tornado was recorded. No damage was reported.						
EFU	S of Cut Knife (2nd tornado)	Cut Knife	SK	52.67°N 109.05°W	21:35	Unknown	Unknown
EFU	A weak landspout tornado was recorded. No damage was reported.						

=== June 10 event ===
List of confirmed tornadoes – Tuesday, June 10, 2025
EF#	Location	Region	Province	Start coord.	Time (UTC)	Path length	Max. width
EF2	NW of Saguenay	Saguenay–Lac-Saint-Jean	QC	49.5758°N 72.6020°W	19:40	3.63 km (2.26 mi)	280 m (310 yd)
EF2	Satellite imagery showed tornado damage paths through forested areas.						

=== June 13 event ===
List of confirmed tornadoes – Friday, June 13, 2025
EF#	Location	Region	Province	Start coord.	Time (UTC)	Path length	Max. width
EFU	S of Coleville	Oakdale	SK	51.68°N 109.23°W	00:00	Unknown	Unknown
EFU	A weak landspout tornado was recorded. No damage was reported.						
EFU	Southern Red Deer	Red Deer	AB	52.21°N 113.79°W	14:30	Unknown	Unknown
EFU	A tornado was observed; no damage was reported.						
EFU	N of Rivière Qui Barre	Sturgeon	AB	53.79°N 113.86°W	22:50	Unknown	Unknown
EFU	A tornado was observed; no damage was reported.						

=== June 14 event ===
List of confirmed tornadoes – Saturday, June 14, 2025
EF#	Location	Region	Province	Start coord.	Time (UTC)	Path length	Max. width
EFU	E of Hepburn	Laird	SK	52.52°N 106.71°W	21:41	Unknown	Unknown
EFU	A weak cone tornado was recorded. No damage was reported.						

=== June 15 event ===
List of confirmed tornadoes – Sunday, June 15, 2025
EF#	Location	Region	Province	Start coord.	Time (UTC)	Path length	Max. width
EFU	E of Didsbury	Mountain View	AB	51.68°N 114.04°W	21:30	Unknown	Unknown
EFU	A tornado was recorded; no damage was reported.						

=== June 19 event ===
Saskatchewan events associated with the tornado outbreak and derecho of June 19–22, 2025.

List of confirmed tornadoes – Thursday, June 19, 2025
EF#	Location	Region	Province	Start coord.	Time (UTC)	Path length	Max. width
EF0	N of Lefebvre	Centre-du-Québec	QC	45.7309°N 72.4440°W	19:20	5.84 km (3.63 mi)	230 m (250 yd)
EF0	A tornado caused minor tree damage.						
EF1	Danville	Estrie	QC	45.7574°N 72.1751°W	19:45	14.00 km (8.70 mi)	400 m (440 yd)
EF1	Homes, trailers, trees, and a barn were damaged by this tornado that struck the Danville area.						
EF1	Saint-Évariste-de-Forsyth area	Chaudière-Appalaches	QC	45.9212°N 71.0092°W	21:25	7.26 km (4.51 mi)	120 m (130 yd)
EF1	A tornado affected forested areas.						
EFU	S of Hirsch	Coalfields	SK	49.14°N 102.59°W	22:23	Unknown	Unknown
EFU	A brief tornado was recorded, causing no reported damage.						
EF0	S of Frobisher (1st tornado)	Coalfields	SK	49.1364°N 102.4524°W	22:40	Unknown	Unknown
EF0	A weak tornado caused minor tree damage.						
EF2	S of Frobisher (2nd tornado)	Coalfields	SK	49.1325°N 102.4179°W	22:45	12.50 km (7.77 mi)	650 m (710 yd)
EF2	A strong tornado damaged power poles, oil tanks, grain bins, and trees.						
EF2	E of Kronau (1st tornado)	Lajord	SK	50.3185°N 104.2235°W	23:04	9.46 km (5.88 mi)	680 m (740 yd)
EF2	This tornado damaged a well-constructed home, many farm vehicles, and vegetation in a rural area.						
EF0	E of Kronau (2nd tornado)	Lajord	SK	50.315°N 104.170°W	23:10	Unknown	Unknown
EF0	The same storm produced a second, weaker tornado which damaged vegetation and a grain bin.						
EF1	SW of Saint-Marcel	Chaudière-Appalaches	QC	46.8705°N 70.1242°W	23:20	1.28 km (0.80 mi)	160 m (170 yd)
EF1	Satellite imagery showed tornado damage paths through forested areas.						
EF1	Blackstrap Lake	Dundurn	SK	51.8386°N 106.3793°W	23:25	4.25 km (2.64 mi)	210 m (230 yd)
EF1	Two residences near the northeastern shore of the lake were damaged by this tornado.						
EFU	S of Vibank	Francis	SK	50.28°N 103.94°W	23:51	Unknown	Unknown
EFU	A tornado was recorded, causing no reported damage.						
EFU	NE of Young	Morris	SK	51.80°N 105.64°W	00:18	Unknown	Unknown
EFU	A tornado was recorded, causing no reported damage.						
EF1	N of Dysart	Touchwood	SK	51.1400°N 104.1156°W	02:10	5.30 km (3.29 mi)	220 m (240 yd)
EF1	A tornado caused damage to trees and a shed, additionally causing minor shingle damage to a roof near South Touchwood.						
EF1	S of Hubbard	Ituna Bon Accord	SK	51.0960°N 103.4340°W	03:00	11.30 km (7.02 mi)	890 m (970 yd)
EF1	This tornado damaged trees, a rural home and farm buildings, and an RV.						

=== June 21 event ===
List of confirmed tornadoes – Saturday, June 21, 2025
EF#	Location	Region	Province	Start coord.	Time (UTC)	Path length	Max. width
EFU	SW of Glenbain	Glen Bain	SK	49.83°N 107.05°W	20:55	Unknown	Unknown
EFU	A brief tornado caused no known damage.						
EFU	N of Cabri	Riverside	SK	50.65°N 108.46°W	22:15	Unknown	Unknown
EFU	A brief tornado caused no known damage.						

=== June 23 event ===
List of confirmed tornadoes – Monday, June 23, 2025
EF#	Location	Region	Province	Start coord.	Time (UTC)	Path length	Max. width
EF0	Saint-Raphaël	Chaudière-Appalaches	QC	49.7872°N 70.7827°W	01:10	5.97 km (3.71 mi)	550 m (600 yd)
EF0	Several barns and trees were damaged by this tornado.						
EF1	S of Notre-Dame-du-Rosaire	Chaudière-Appalaches	QC	46.7757°N 70.4072°W	01:35	1.75 km (1.09 mi)	160 m (170 yd)
EF1	A tornado affected forested areas.						
EF1	W of Gouin Reservoir (1st tornado)	Mauricie	QC	48.4647°N 75.4900°W	21:00	2.57 km (1.60 mi)	380 m (420 yd)
EF1	A tornado affected forested areas.						
EF2	W of Gouin Reservoir (2nd tornado)	Mauricie	QC	48.3975°N 75.5880°W	21:00	10.6 km (6.6 mi)	680 m (740 yd)
EF2	Another tornado affected nearby forested areas.						
EF1	E of Wemotaci	Mauricie	QC	47.9149°N 73.5056°W	22:30	1.90 km (1.18 mi)	110 m (120 yd)
EF1	Satellite imagery showed tornado damage paths through forested areas.						
EF1	NE of Wemotaci	Mauricie	QC	48.2033°N 73.5234°W	22:30	2.42 km (1.50 mi)	170 m (190 yd)
EF1	Satellite imagery showed tornado damage paths through forested areas.						

=== June 27 event ===
List of confirmed tornadoes – Friday, June 27, 2025
EF#	Location	Region	Province	Start coord.	Time (UTC)	Path length	Max. width
EFU	E of Rumsey	Starland	AB	51.85°N 112.72°W	19:15	Unknown	Unknown
EFU	A tornado was observed; no damage was reported.						

=== June 29 event ===
List of confirmed tornadoes – Sunday, June 29, 2025
EF#	Location	Region	Province	Start coord.	Time (UTC)	Path length	Max. width
EF0	SE of Stockholm	Fertile Belt	SK	50.5617°N 102.2127°W	03:00	0.63 km (0.39 mi)	70 m (77 yd)
EF0	This weak tornado cut a short path through a forested area.						

=== June 30 event ===
List of confirmed tornadoes – Monday, June 30, 2025
EF#	Location	Region	Province	Start coord.	Time (UTC)	Path length	Max. width
EF0	S of Lucan	Middlesex	ON	43.1711°N 81.3937°W	19:23	1.91 km (1.19 mi)	100 m (110 yd)
EF0	A weak tornado damaged a farm property and nearby vegetation.						

== July ==
=== July 2 event ===
List of confirmed tornadoes – Wednesday, July 2, 2025
EF#	Location	Region	Province	Start coord.	Time (UTC)	Path length	Max. width
EF2	NE of Lac La Biche	Lac La Biche	AB	54.8579°N 111.6589°W	23:10	1.32 km (0.82 mi)	190 m (210 yd)
EF2	AI-assisted satellite imagery review identified a tornado damage path in forested areas near Jackson Lake						
EF1	E of Lac La Biche	Lac La Biche	AB	54.7508°N 111.6525°W	23:25	5.43 km (3.37 mi)	520 m (570 yd)
EF1	AI-assisted satellite imagery review identified a tornado damage path in forested areas near Shaw Lake						
EF2	N of Lodgepole	Brazeau	AB	53.1488°N 115.3281°W	23:30	3.36 km (2.09 mi)	600 m (660 yd)
EF2	A strong tornado caused tree damage as it moved slowly along a crescent-shaped path.						

=== July 5 event ===
List of confirmed tornadoes – Saturday, July 5, 2025
EF#	Location	Region	Province	Start coord.	Time (UTC)	Path length	Max. width
EF1	NE of Amos	Abitibi-Témiscamingue	QC	48.8188°N 77.7255°W	21:40	4.35 km (2.70 mi)	140 m (150 yd)
EF1	Satellite imagery showed tornado damage paths through forested areas.						
EF1	NW of Obedjiwan	Mauricie	QC	48.7270°N 75.1821°W	00:10	3.32 km (2.06 mi)	140 m (150 yd)
EF1	Satellite imagery showed tornado damage paths through forested areas.						

=== July 9 event ===
List of confirmed tornadoes – Wednesday, July 9, 2025
EF#	Location	Region	Province	Start coord.	Time (UTC)	Path length	Max. width
EF1	W of Rocky Mountain House	Clearwater	AB	52.2891°N 115.4071°E	20:55	5.67 km (3.52 mi)	320 m (350 yd)
EF1	A tornado snapped trees in a forested area near Strachan.						

=== July 10 event ===
List of confirmed tornadoes – Saturday, July 12, 2025
EF#	Location	Region	Province	Start coord.	Time (UTC)	Path length	Max. width
EF2	W of Pikangikum First Nation	Kenora	ON	51.5588°N 93.3545°W	17:05	4.70 km (2.92 mi)	210 m (230 yd)
EF2	AI-assisted satellite imagery review identified a tornado damage path in forested areas at Storey Lake						

=== July 12 event ===
List of confirmed tornadoes – Saturday, July 12, 2025
EF#	Location	Region	Province	Start coord.	Time (UTC)	Path length	Max. width
EF2	SE of Gowganda	Timiskaming	ON	47.4455°N 80.5097°W	21:50	11.5 km (7.1 mi)	1,080 m (1,180 yd)
EF2	A strong tornado affected forested areas near Trethewey Lake.						
EF2	S of Elk Lake	Timiskaming	ON	47.5660°N 80.4122°W	22:05	3.68 km (2.29 mi)	340 m (370 yd)
EF2	Another strong tornado was produced by the same supercell as the previous one, causing more tree damage in forested areas near Crane Creek.						
EF2	S of Kirkland Lake	Timiskaming	ON	48.0210°N 79.9979°W	23:00	9.27 km (5.76 mi)	600 m (660 yd)
EF2	A third tornado affected rural forested areas.						
EF1	NE of Fugèreville	Abitibi-Témiscamingue	QC	47.4361°N 79.1574°W	00:25	1.30 km (0.81 mi)	90 m (98 yd)
EF1	Satellite imagery showed tornado damage paths through forested areas.						

=== July 17 event ===
List of confirmed tornadoes – Thursday, June 17, 2025
EF#	Location	Region	Province	Start coord.	Time (UTC)	Path length	Max. width
EF1	NE of Otter Lake	Outaouais	QC	45.9856°N 76.2844°W	16:30	2.58 km (1.60 mi)	320 m (350 yd)
EF1	Satellite imagery showed tornado damage paths through forested areas.						

=== July 20 event ===
List of confirmed tornadoes – Sunday, June 20, 2025
EF#	Location	Region	Province	Start coord.	Time (UTC)	Path length	Max. width
EFU	E of Bradwell	Blucher	SK	51.94°N 106.17°W	00:50	Unknown	Unknown
EFU	A weak tornado was spotted over open fields.						
EFU	SW of Elstow	Blucher	SK	51.95°N 106.12°W	01:20	Unknown	Unknown
EFU	A brief tornado touched down, causing no reported damage.						

=== July 22 event ===
List of confirmed tornadoes – Tuesday, June 22, 2025
EF#	Location	Region	Province	Start coord.	Time (UTC)	Path length	Max. width
EF1	W of Kakagi Lake	Kenora	ON	49.2284°N 93.6291°W	19:20	1.33 km (0.83 mi)	190 m (210 yd)
EF1	AI-assisted satellite imagery review identified a tornado damage path in forested areas near Otterskin Lake						
EF2	E of Ignace	Kenora	ON	49.3877°N 91.2139°W	22:35	9.43 km (5.86 mi)	400 m (440 yd)
EF2	AI-assisted satellite imagery review identified a tornado damage path in forested areas near Wink Lake.						
EF1	W of Ignace	Kenora	ON	49.3294°N 92.3230°W	01:40	1.07 km (0.66 mi)	180 m (200 yd)
EF1	Satellite imagery showed tornado damage paths through forested areas. Another area of uncategorized wind damage was found east of this track.						

=== July 26 event ===
List of confirmed tornadoes – Saturday, July 26, 2025
EF#	Location	Region	Province	Start coord.	Time (UTC)	Path length	Max. width
EF2	W of Thunder Bay	Thunder Bay	ON	48.4105°N 90.3730°W	19:55	7.99 km (4.96 mi)	400 m (440 yd)
EF2	Satellite imagery showed tornado damage paths through forested areas.						
EF0	S of Goderich	Huron	ON	43.6727°N 81.6544°W	22:55	6.24 km (3.88 mi)	190 m (210 yd)
EF0	This tornado caused damage to a barn, a coverall building, and trees north of Porter's Hill.						
EF0	SE of Blyth	Huron	ON	43.6704°N 81.4352°W	23:30	4.68 km (2.91 mi)	330 m (360 yd)
EF0	A tornado caused tree and crop damage near Harlock.						

=== July 27 event ===
List of confirmed tornadoes – Sunday, July 27, 2025
EF#	Location	Region	Province	Start coord.	Time (UTC)	Path length	Max. width
EF2	NE of Mine Centre	Rainy River	ON	48.7882°N 92.5134°W	18:10	5.58 km (3.47 mi)	260 m (280 yd)
EF2	A strong tornado caused extensive tree damage as it moved through forested areas.						
EF1	N of Atikokan	Rainy River	ON	48.9284°N 91.5784°W	19:15	3.33 km (2.07 mi)	220 m (240 yd)
EF1	AI-assisted satellite imagery review identified a tornado damage path in forested areas near Finlayson Lake.						
EF1	SW of Gull Bay First Nation	Thunder Bay	ON	49.7006°N 89.3332°W	21:50	2.52 km (1.57 mi)	230 m (250 yd)
EF1	AI-assisted satellite imagery review identified a tornado damage path in forested areas near Candide Lake.						
EF1	W of Gull Bay First Nation	Thunder Bay	ON	49.7913°N 89.3363°W	21:50	4.98 km (3.09 mi)	210 m (230 yd)
EF1	AI-assisted satellite imagery review identified a tornado damage path in forested areas near Log Lake.						

=== July 28 event ===
List of confirmed tornadoes – Monday, June 28, 2025
EF#	Location	Region	Province	Start coord.	Time (UTC)	Path length	Max. width
EF2	S of White River (1st tornado)	Algoma	ON	48.5210°N 85.3236°W	05:25	9.61 km (5.97 mi)	670 m (730 yd)
EF2	Satellite imagery showed tornado damage paths through forested areas.						
EF1	S of White River (2nd tornado)	Algoma	ON	48.3680°N 85.2455°W	05:35	4.77 km (2.96 mi)	510 m (560 yd)
EF1	Satellite imagery showed tornado damage paths through forested areas.						
EF1	NE of Chapleau (1st tornado)	Sudbury	ON	47.9528°N 82.9993°W	07:35	3.50 km (2.17 mi)	210 m (230 yd)
EF1	Satellite imagery showed tornado damage paths through forested areas. The parent supercell would go on to produce another tornado nearby.						
EF1	NE of Chapleau (2nd tornado)	Sudbury	ON	47.9527°N 82.8970°W	07:45	7.16 km (4.45 mi)	350 m (380 yd)
EF1	Satellite imagery showed tornado damage paths through forested areas.						
EF1	NW of Chapleau	Sudbury	ON	47.9090°N 82.7168°W	07:55	4.06 km (2.52 mi)	250 m (270 yd)
EF1	Satellite imagery showed tornado damage paths through forested areas.						

== August ==
=== August 3 event ===
List of confirmed tornadoes – Sunday, August 3, 2025
EF#	Location	Region	Province	Start coord.	Time (UTC)	Path length	Max. width
EF1	NW of L'Étape	Capitale-Nationale	QC	47.7388°N 71.4704°W	21:05	5.73 km (3.56 mi)	310 m (340 yd)
EF1	Satellite imagery showed tornado damage paths through forested areas.						
EF0	NE of Hardisty (1)	Flagstaff	AB	52.7061°N 111.2455°W	22:30	3.43 km (2.13 mi)	80 m (87 yd)
EF0	Witnesses captured video and photos of a tornado northeast of Hardisty, causing minor tree damage and damage to crops. A private citizen captured drone imagery of the damage path, and satellite imagery review revealed parts of the damage path as well.						
EF0	NE of Hardisty (2)	Flagstaff	AB	52.7508°N 111.3306°W	22:45	3.27 km (2.03 mi)	100 m (110 yd)
EF0	Witnesses captured video and photos of a funnel cloud north of Hardisty, where a path of crop damage was discovered during satellite imagery review.						
EF0	NE of Kinsella	Beaver	AB	52.8713°N 111.4643°W	23:15	6.43 km (4.00 mi)	60 m (66 yd)
EF0	Witnesses captured video and photos of a funnel cloud south of Kinsella, where tree damage was later reported. Satellite imagery review revealed the damage path through cropland.						

=== August 5 event ===
List of confirmed tornadoes – Tuesday, August 5, 2025
EF#	Location	Region	Province	Start coord.	Time (UTC)	Path length	Max. width
EFU	Grande-Clairière area	Westman	MB	49.50°N 100.70°W	01:45	Unknown	Unknown
EFU	A weak tornado was recorded; no damage was found.						
EFU	E of Gray	Lajord	SK	50.16°N 104.38°W	01:55	Unknown	Unknown
EFU	A brief tornado touched down, causing no known damage.						

=== August 6 event ===
List of confirmed tornadoes – Wednesday, August 6, 2025
EF#	Location	Region	Province	Start coord.	Time (UTC)	Path length	Max. width
EF0	Birds Hill Provincial Park	Springfield, St. Clements	MB	49.9969°N 96.8999°W	22:06	4.1 km (2.5 mi)	270 m (300 yd)
EF0	A narrow path of minor tree damage was produced by this tornado.						
EF0	N of Dugald	Springfield	MB	49.9007°N 96.8575°W	22:30	4.24 km (2.63 mi)	70 m (77 yd)
EF0	Another tornado caused minor tree and crop damage.						

=== August 7 event ===
List of confirmed tornadoes – Thursday, August 7, 2025
EF#	Location	Region	Province	Start coord.	Time (UTC)	Path length	Max. width
EFU	N of Barnwell	Taber	AB	49.82°N 112.33°W	00:29	Unknown	Unknown
EFU	A tornado was recorded; no damage was reported.						
EF1	SW of Eabametoong	Kenora	ON	51.1358°N 88.412°W	28:30	4.98 km (3.09 mi)	350 m (380 yd)
EF1	AI-assisted satellite imagery review identified a tornado damage path in forested areas near Greensides Lake.						

=== August 8 event ===
List of confirmed tornadoes – Friday, August 8, 2025
EF#	Location	Region	Province	Start coord.	Time (UTC)	Path length	Max. width
EF2	W of Red Lake	Kenora	ON	51.2162°N 93.5501°W	17:50	3.72 km (2.31 mi)	310 m (340 yd)
EF2	AI-assisted satellite imagery review identified a tornado damage path in forested areas near Anderson Lake.						

=== August 13 event ===
List of confirmed tornadoes – Wednesday, August 13, 2025
EF#	Location	Region	Province	Start coord.	Time (UTC)	Path length	Max. width
EF1	N of Cookson	Shellbrook	ON	53.6314°N 106.3101°W	18:45	2.85 km (1.77 mi)	330 m (360 yd)
EF1	AI-assisted satellite imagery review identified a tornado damage path in forested areas near Hunters Lake						

=== August 14 event ===
List of confirmed tornadoes – Wednesday, August 13, 2025
EF#	Location	Region	Province	Start coord.	Time (UTC)	Path length	Max. width
EF1	E of Pikangikum	Kenora	ON	51.6514°N 92.6474°W	20:55	3.35 km (2.08 mi)	160 m (170 yd)
EF1	AI-assisted satellite imagery review identified a tornado damage path in forested areas near Coathup Lake						

=== August 16 event ===
List of confirmed tornadoes – Saturday, August 16, 2025
EF#	Location	Region	Province	Start coord.	Time (UTC)	Path length	Max. width
EF1	NW of Sudbury	Sudbury	ON	46.7555°N 81.7176°W	00:50	4.98 km (3.09 mi)	350 m (380 yd)
EF1	Satellite imagery showed tornado damage paths through forested areas.						

=== August 20 event ===
List of confirmed tornadoes – Wednesday, August 20, 2025
EF#	Location	Region	Province	Start coord.	Time (UTC)	Path length	Max. width
EF0	Buffer Lake area	Grant	SK	52.4352°N 105.9812°W	03:15	0.74 km (0.46 mi)	150 m (160 yd)
EF0	Amid storms in the area, a brief tornado touched down, damaging grain bins, trees, and crops.						

=== August 21 event ===
List of confirmed tornadoes – Thursday, August 21, 2025
EF#	Location	Region	Province	Start coord.	Time (UTC)	Path length	Max. width
EF2	S of Cumberland House	Northern Saskatchewan Administration District	ON	53.6883°N 102.421°W	01:30	2.58 km (1.60 mi)	460 m (500 yd)
EF2	AI-assisted satellite imagery review identified a tornado damage path in forested areas near Wapisew Lake.						

== September ==
=== September 5 event ===
List of confirmed tornadoes – Friday, September 5, 2025
EF#	Location	Region	Province	Start coord.	Time (UTC)	Path length	Max. width
EF2	E of Rouyn-Noranda	Abitibi-Témiscamingue	QC	48.1859°N 78.7437°W	20:15	12.8 km (8.0 mi)	530 m (580 yd)
EF2	Satellite imagery showed tornado damage paths through forested areas.						
EF2	NW of Authier-Nord	Abitibi-Témiscamingue	QC	48.9038°N 78.7509°W	20:45	3.77 km (2.34 mi)	280 m (310 yd)
EF2	Satellite imagery showed tornado damage paths through forested areas.						
EF2	E of Senneterre	Abitibi-Témiscamingue	QC	48.359°N 77.1333°W	21:50	26.7 km (16.6 mi)	490 m (540 yd)
EF2	Satellite imagery showed tornado damage paths through forested areas.						
EF2	NE of Senneterre	Abitibi-Témiscamingue	QC	48.617°N 76.851°W	22:15	3.48 km (2.16 mi)	390 m (430 yd)
EF2	Satellite imagery showed tornado damage paths through forested areas.						

== See also ==
- Weather of 2025
- List of North American tornadoes and tornado outbreaks
