= Pheasant Rump Nakota First Nation =

Indian reserve in Saskatchewan, Canada

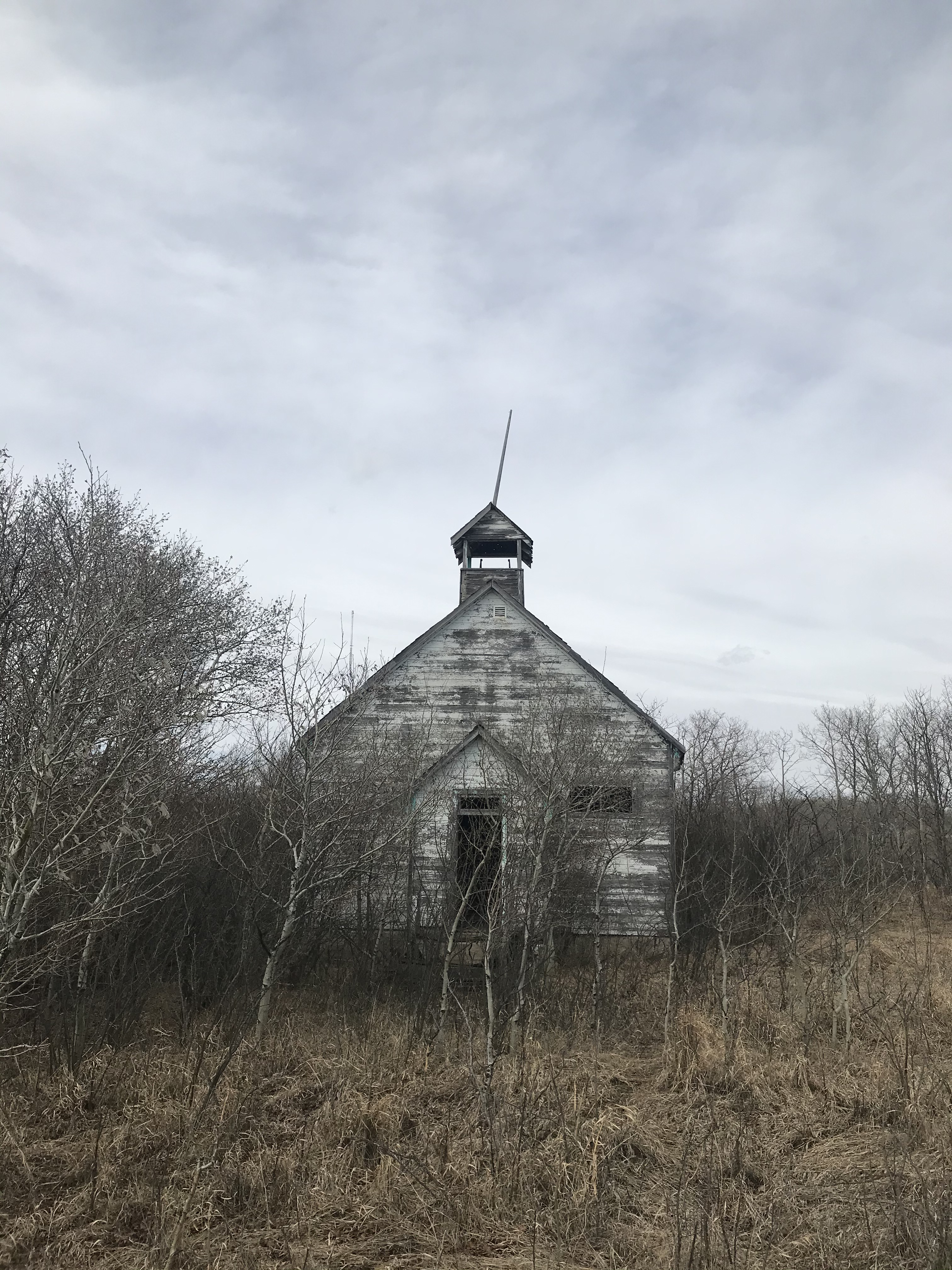
Old school in Warmley

The Pheasant Rump Nakota First Nation (Assiniboine: Šiyónidè oyáde) is a First Nation in the Canadian province of Saskatchewan, who reside on the Pheasant Rump 68 Indian reserve near Kisbey. This band government contains three nations, which are Nakoda. The main community on the reserve lands is Warmley.

Signatories to Treaty 4 in 1876, the First Nation's reserve was established in 1881. In September 2016, they became a signatory of the Buffalo Treaty.

== See also ==
- List of Indian reserves in Saskatchewan
