= Pheasant Rump 68 =

Indian reserve in Saskatchewan, Canada

Coordinates: 49°47′02″N 102°43′12″W

- Indian reserve
- Pheasant Rump Indian Reserve No. 68
- Location in Saskatchewan
- First Nation: Pheasant Rump
- Country: Canada
- Province: Saskatchewan

Area
  - Total: 5,444.5 ha (13,454 acres)

Population (2016)
  - Total: 56
  - Density: 1.0/km^{2} (2.7/sq mi)

Pheasant Rump 68 is an Indian reserve of the Pheasant Rump Nakota First Nation in Saskatchewan. It is about 10 kilometres (6.2 mi) north of Kisbey. In the 2016 Canadian Census, it recorded a population of 56 living in 11 of its 18 total private dwellings.

== See also ==
- List of Indian reserves in Saskatchewan
