= Rural Municipality of Brock No. 64 =

Rural municipality in Saskatchewan, Canada

Brock No. 64
- Rural municipality
- Rural Municipality of Brock No. 64
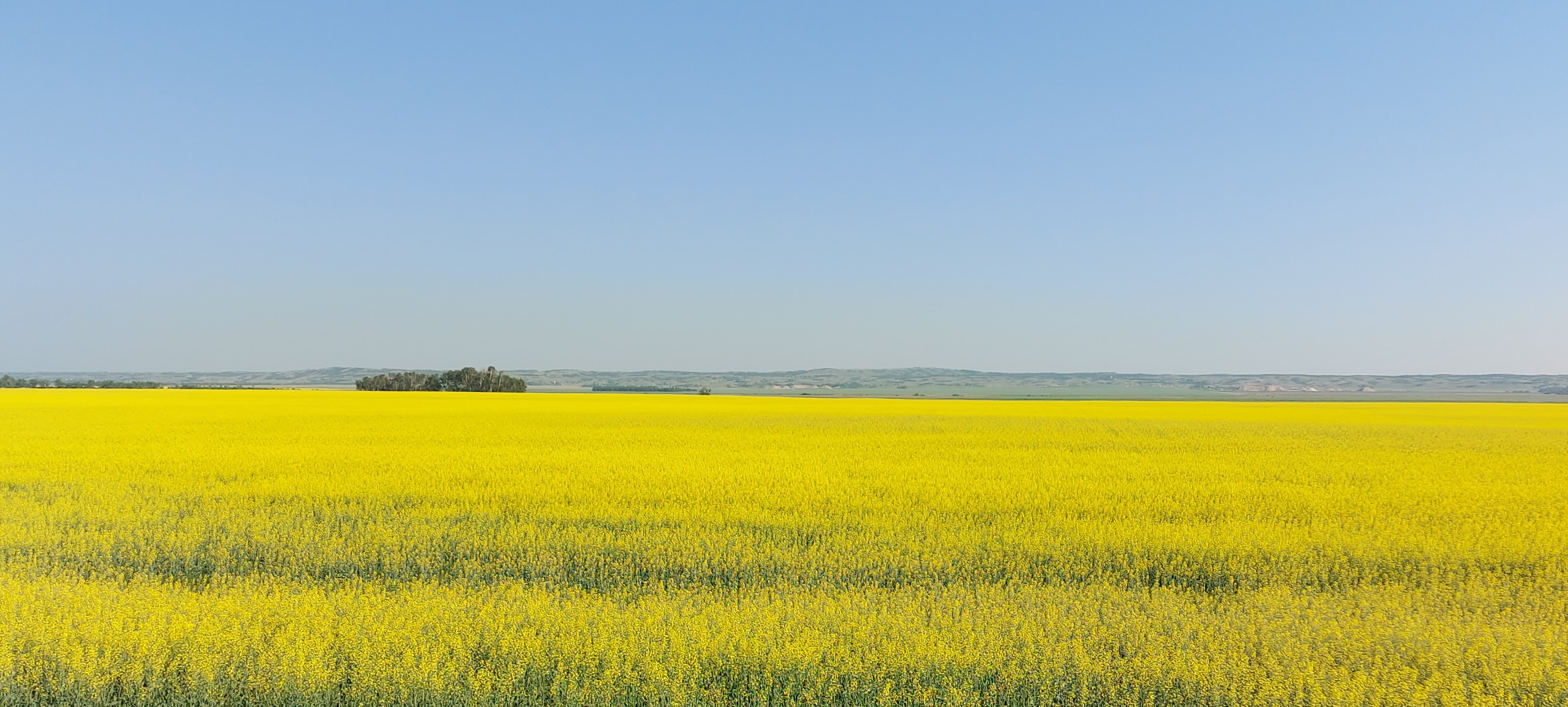
- Moose Mountain Upland is visible across a canola field in the RM of Brock No. 64

- Location of the RM of Brock No. 64 in Saskatchewan
- Coordinates: 49.682°N 102.656°W
- Country: Canada
- Province: Saskatchewan
- Census division: 1
- SARM division: 1
- Federal riding: Souris—Moose Mountain
- Provincial riding: Cannington
- Formed: December 12, 1910

Government
  - Reeve: Paul Cameron
  - Governing body: RM of Brock No. 64 Council
  - Administrator: Miranda Debusschere
  - Office location: Kisbey

Area (2016)
  - Land: 797.13 km^{2} (307.77 sq mi)

Population (2016)
  - Total: 267
  - Density: 0.3/km^{2} (0.78/sq mi)
- Time zone: CST
  - Summer (DST): CST
- Postal code: S0C 1L0
- Area codes: 306 and 639

The Rural Municipality of Brock No. 64 (2016 population: 267) is a rural municipality (RM) in the Canadian province of Saskatchewan within Census Division No. 1 and SARM Division No. 1. It is located in the southeast portion of the province.

== History ==
The RM of Brock No. 64 incorporated as a rural municipality on December 12, 1910.

== Geography ==
=== Communities and localities ===
The following urban municipalities are surrounded by the RM.

Towns

- Arcola

Villages

- Kisbey

The following unincorporated communities are located within the RM.

Unincorporated hamlets

- Armilla

== Demographics ==
Population history (1981–2016)
Year	Pop.	±%
1981	400	—
1986	361	−9.8%
1991	329	−8.9%
1996	356	+8.2%
2001	383	+7.6%
2006	279	−27.2%
2011	238	−14.7%
2016	267	+12.2%
Source: Statistics Canada via Saskatchewan Bureau of Statistics

In the 2021 Census of Population conducted by Statistics Canada, the RM of Brock No. 64 had a population of 252 living in 109 of its 121 total private dwellings, a change of −5.6% from its 2016 population of 267. With a land area of 784.64 km^{2} (302.95 sq mi), it had a population density of 0.3/km^{2} (0.8/sq mi) in 2021.

In the 2016 Census of Population, the RM of Brock No. 64 recorded a population of 267 living in 115 of its 122 total private dwellings, a 12.2% change from its 2011 population of 238. With a land area of 797.13 km^{2} (307.77 sq mi), it had a population density of 0.3/km^{2} (0.9/sq mi) in 2016.

== Government ==
The RM of Brock No. 64 is governed by an elected municipal council and an appointed administrator that meets on the second Tuesday of every month. The reeve of the RM is Paul Cameron while its administrator is Miranda Debusschere. The RM's office is located in Kisbey.

== See also ==
- List of rural municipalities in Saskatchewan
- List of communities in Saskatchewan

Media related to Rural Municipality of Brock No. 64 at Wikimedia Commons
