= Bienfait =

Town in Saskatchewan, Canada

Bienfait, Saskatchewan
- Town
- Downtown

- Location of Bienfait in Saskatchewan Bienfait, Saskatchewan (Canada)
- Coordinates: 49.1465°N 102.7956°W
- Country: Canada
- Province: Saskatchewan
- Census division: 1
- Post office established: 1893
- Village: Apr 16, 1912
- Town: March 1, 1957

Government
  - Mayor: Ken Bonokoski

Area
  - Total: 3.09 km^{2} (1.19 sq mi)

Population (2011)
  - Total: 780
  - Density: 252.4/km^{2} (654/sq mi)
- Postal code: S0C 0M0
- Area code: 306

Bienfait /ˈbiːnfeɪt/ is a town in Saskatchewan on Highway 18 that is 14 kilometres (8.7 mi) east of Estevan. It is surrounded by the RM of Coalfields.

For services, Bienfait has one K–8 school, a gas station, a curling rink and an ice rink, which is where the Bienfait Coalers of the Big 6 Hockey League play. The Coalers have won the Lincoln Trophy 15 times, which is the most of any team.

The Bienfait Museum is in the old CPR Station on the east end of town. The original location for the station was on the CPR line on the north side of town.

== History ==
Bienfait was incorporated as the Village of Bienfait on April 16, 1912. It became a town on March 1, 1957, and was named by the Canadian Pacific Railway after Antoine Charles Bienfait, a banker with Adolphe Boissevain & Company of Amsterdam since the firm had been involved in the sale of Canadian Pacific shares in Europe.

In 1931, striking coal miners marched from Bienfait to nearby Estevan, which resulted in the Estevan Riot.

=== Train / Caboose Lot ===
On the north side of town on Railway Avenue at the head of Main Street, sits a Manitoba & Saskatchewan Coal Company (M&S) Locomotive #3522, which is on the Canadian Register of Historic Places. The M & S Locomotive was built in 1907 and used to transport coal from the mines to Bienfait to market until 1968. It was one of the last commercially-functioning steam engines in Canada.

The town of Bienfait acquired the locomotive in 1968 and the caboose in 2000. The caboose is an old Canadian National Railway caboose. This site was added to the list of historic places in Saskatchewan on March 28, 2002.

== Demographics ==
In the 2021 Census of Population conducted by Statistics Canada, Bienfait had a population of 668 living in 284 of its 355 total private dwellings, a change of −12.3% from its 2016 population of 762. With a land area of 3.05 km^{2} (1.18 sq mi), it had a population density of 219.0/km^{2} (567.2/sq mi) in 2021.

Canada census – Bienfait community profile

	2021	2011
Population	668 (-12.3% from 2016)	780 (+4.3% from 2006)
Land area	3.05 km^{2} (1.18 sq mi)	3.09 km^{2} (1.19 sq mi)
Population density	218.7/km^{2} (566/sq mi)	252.4/km^{2} (654/sq mi)
Median age	36.4 (M: 36.4, F: 36.4)	33.2 (M: 33.6, F: 32.6)
Private dwellings	355 (total) 284 (occupied)	330 (total)
Median household income	$88,000

References: 2021 2011

== Gallery ==
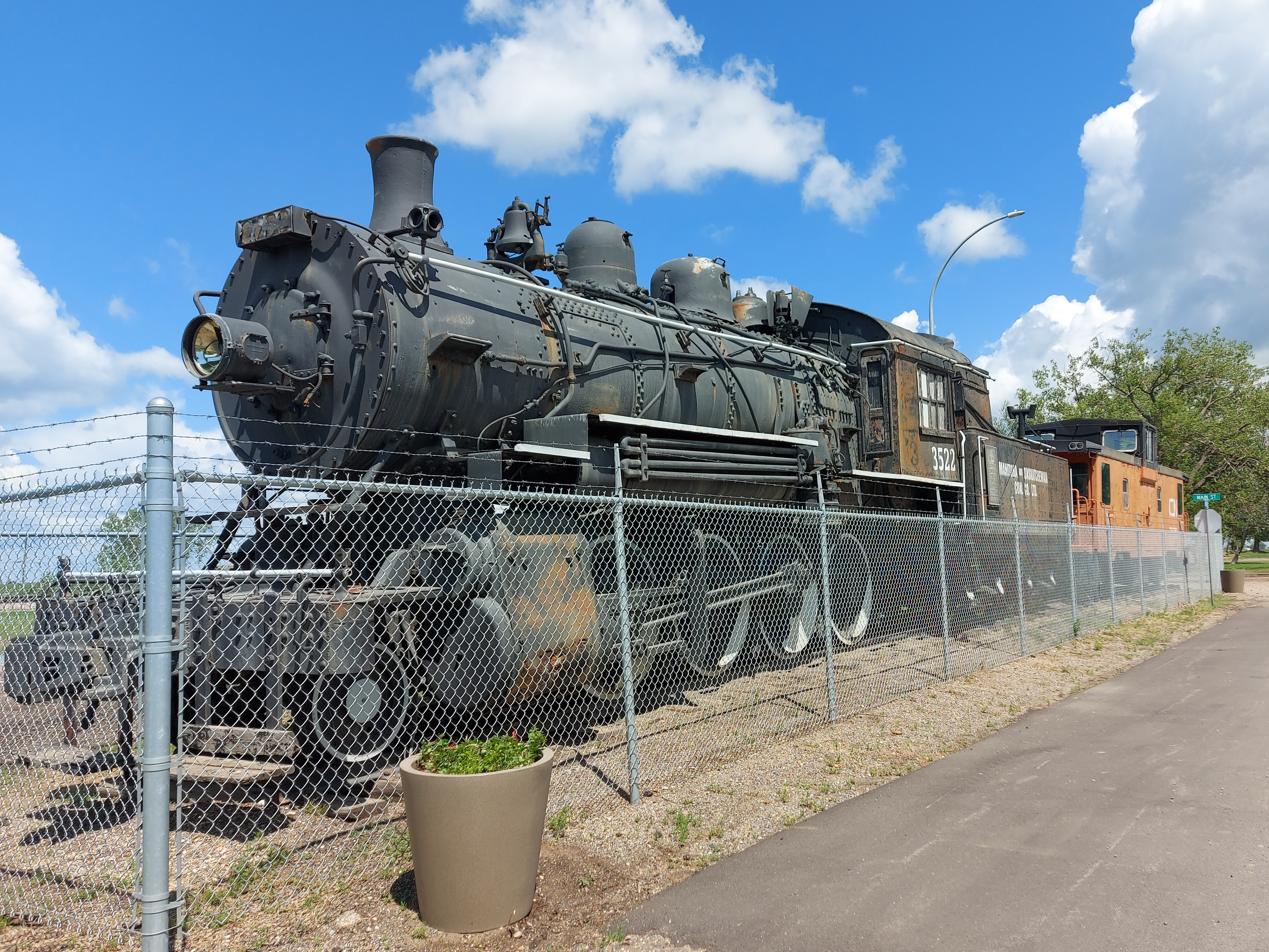
M&S Locomotive in Bienfait

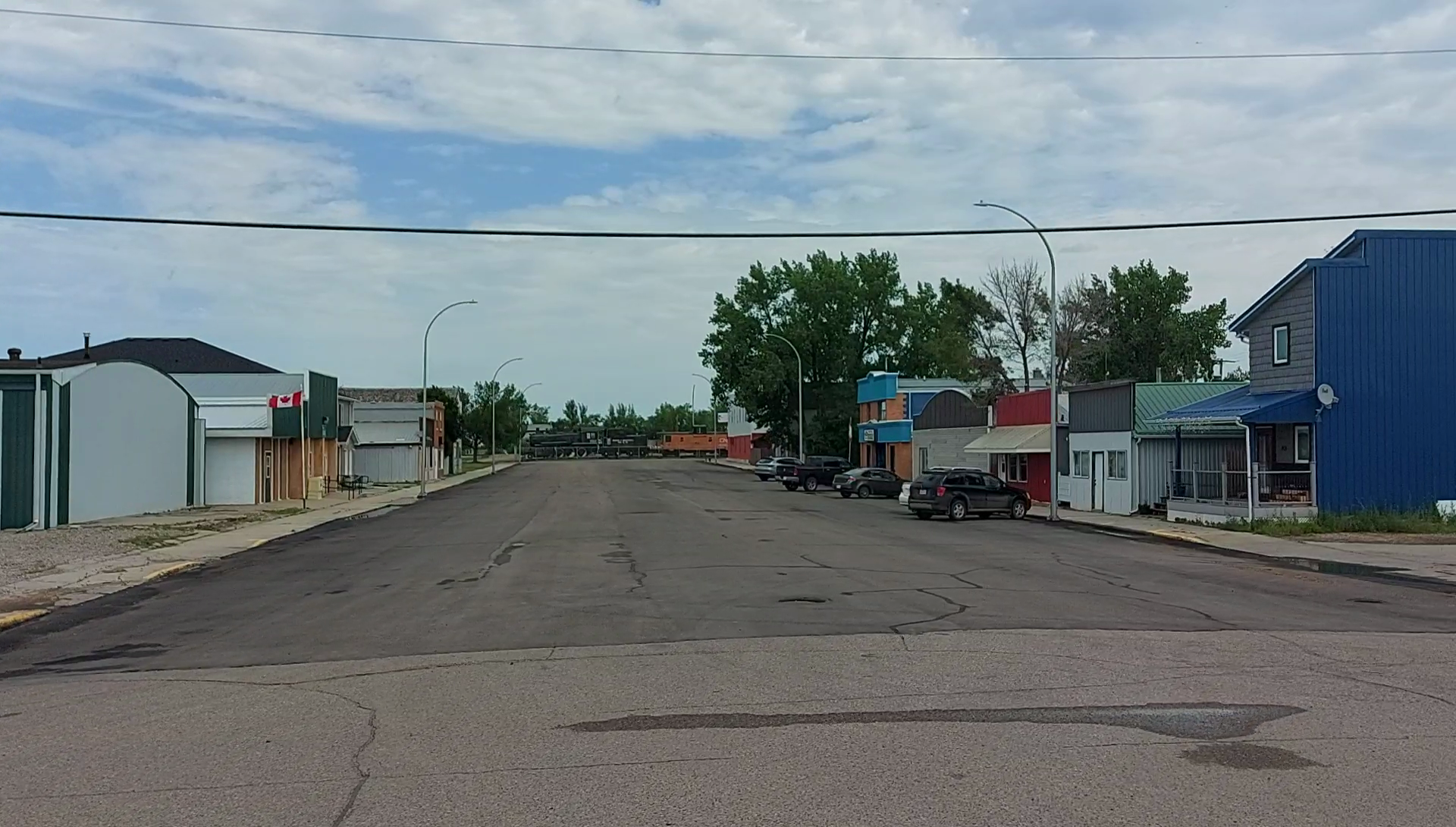
Main Street Bienfait, looking north with the locomotive at the end of the road

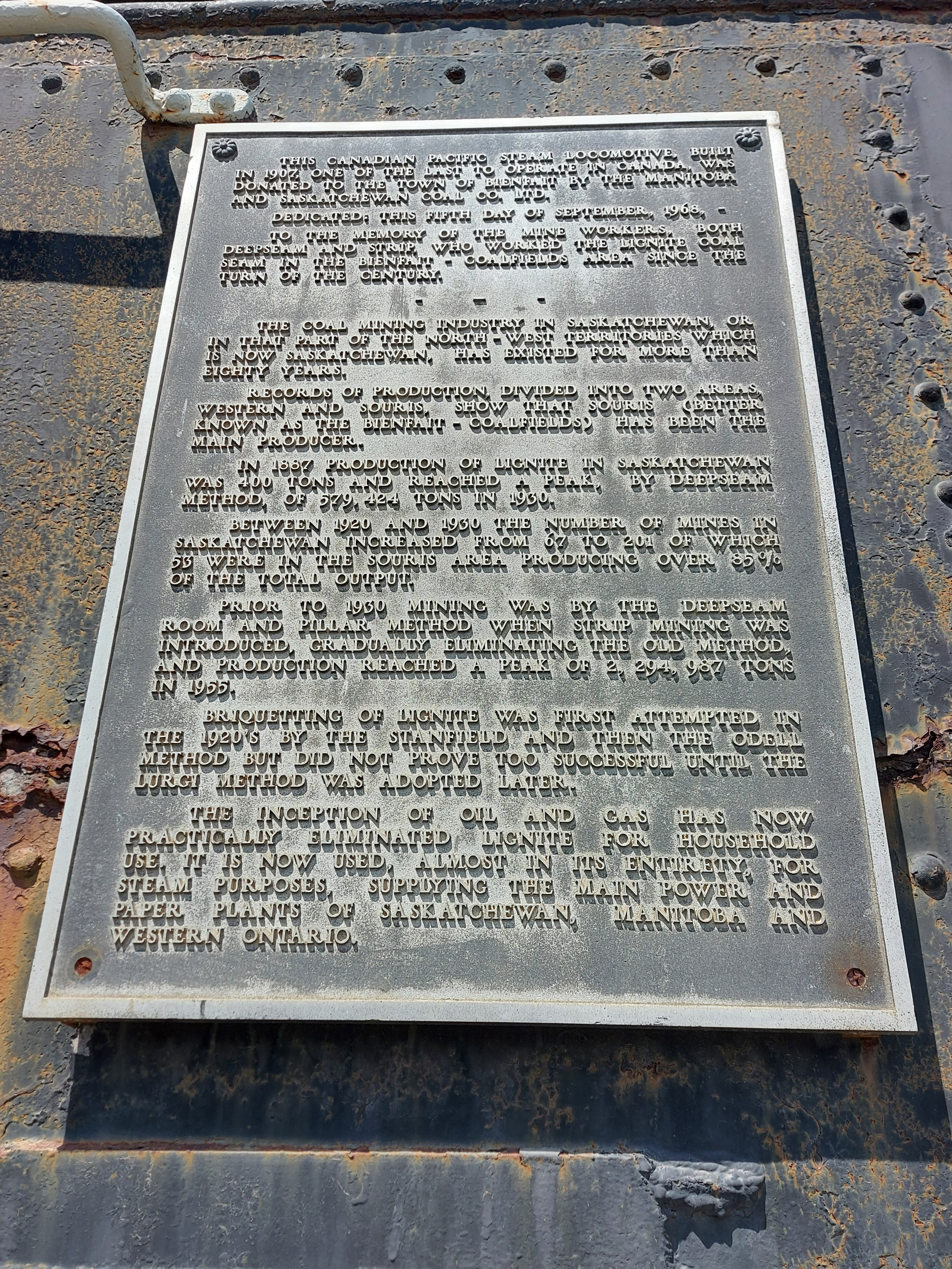
M&S Locomotive plaque

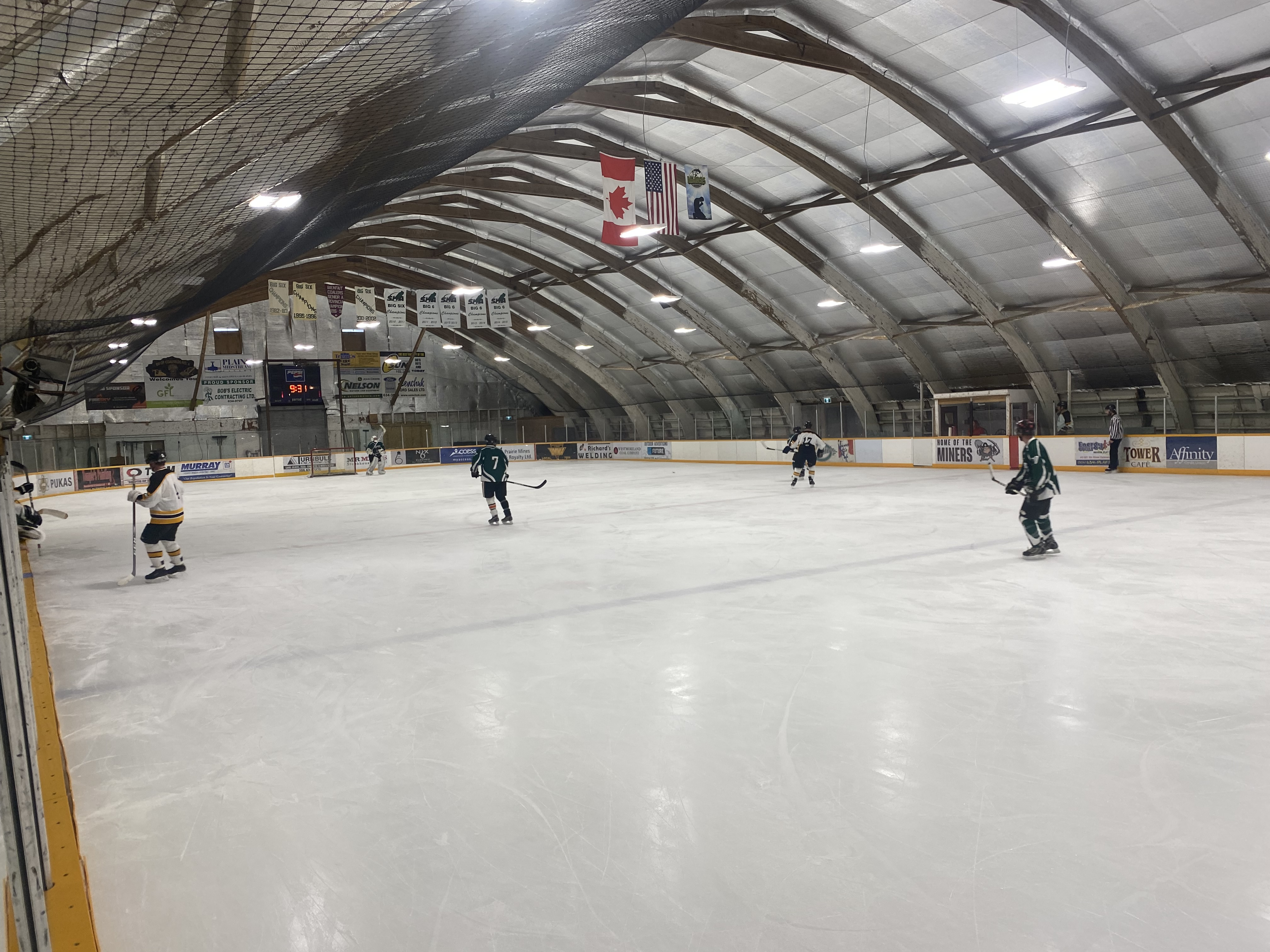
Bienfait Memorial Arena

== Notable people ==
- Andy Shauf — Singer-songwriter and guitarist

== See also ==
- List of communities in Saskatchewan
- List of towns in Saskatchewan
- Coal mining in Saskatchewan
