= Ocean Man 69D =

Indian reserve in Saskatchewan, Canada

Coordinates: 49°50′11″N 102°53′58″W

- Indian reserve
- Ocean Man Indian Reserve No. 69D
- Location in Saskatchewan
- First Nation: Ocean Man
- Country: Canada
- Province: Saskatchewan

Area
  - Total: 192.2 ha (475 acres)

Population (2016)
  - Total: 5
  - Density: 2.6/km^{2} (6.7/sq mi)

Ocean Man 69D is an Indian reserve of the Ocean Man First Nation in Saskatchewan. In the 2016 Canadian Census, it recorded a population of 5 living in 2 of its 2 total private dwellings.

== See also ==
- List of Indian reserves in Saskatchewan
