= Ocean Man 69N =

Indian reserve in Saskatchewan, Canada

Coordinates: 49°48′11″N 102°52′31″W

- Indian reserve
- Ocean Man Indian Reserve No. 69N
- Location in Saskatchewan
- First Nation: Ocean Man
- Country: Canada
- Province: Saskatchewan

Area
  - Total: 128.8 ha (318 acres)

Ocean Man 69N is an Indian reserve of the Ocean Man First Nation in Saskatchewan.

== See also ==
- List of Indian reserves in Saskatchewan
