= Hirsch, Saskatchewan =

Hamlet in Saskatchewan, Canada

Hirsch
- Hamlet
- Location within Saskatchewan Location within Canada
- Coordinates: 49.1753°N 102.5931°W
- Country: Canada
- Province: Saskatchewan
- Census division: Division No. 1
- Rural municipality: RM of Coalfields No. 4
- Post office founded: 1893
- Elevation: 574 m (1,883 ft)
- Time zone: CST
- Postal code: S0C 0Y0
- Area code: 306
- Highways: Highway 18

Hirsch is a hamlet in the Rural Municipality of Coalfields No. 4 in the Canadian province of Saskatchewan. It is about 29 kilometres (18 mi) east of the city of Estevan along Highway 18. The post office originally opened on 1 December 1893 with the town misspelled as "Hirsh". It closed on 31 March 1970.

== History ==
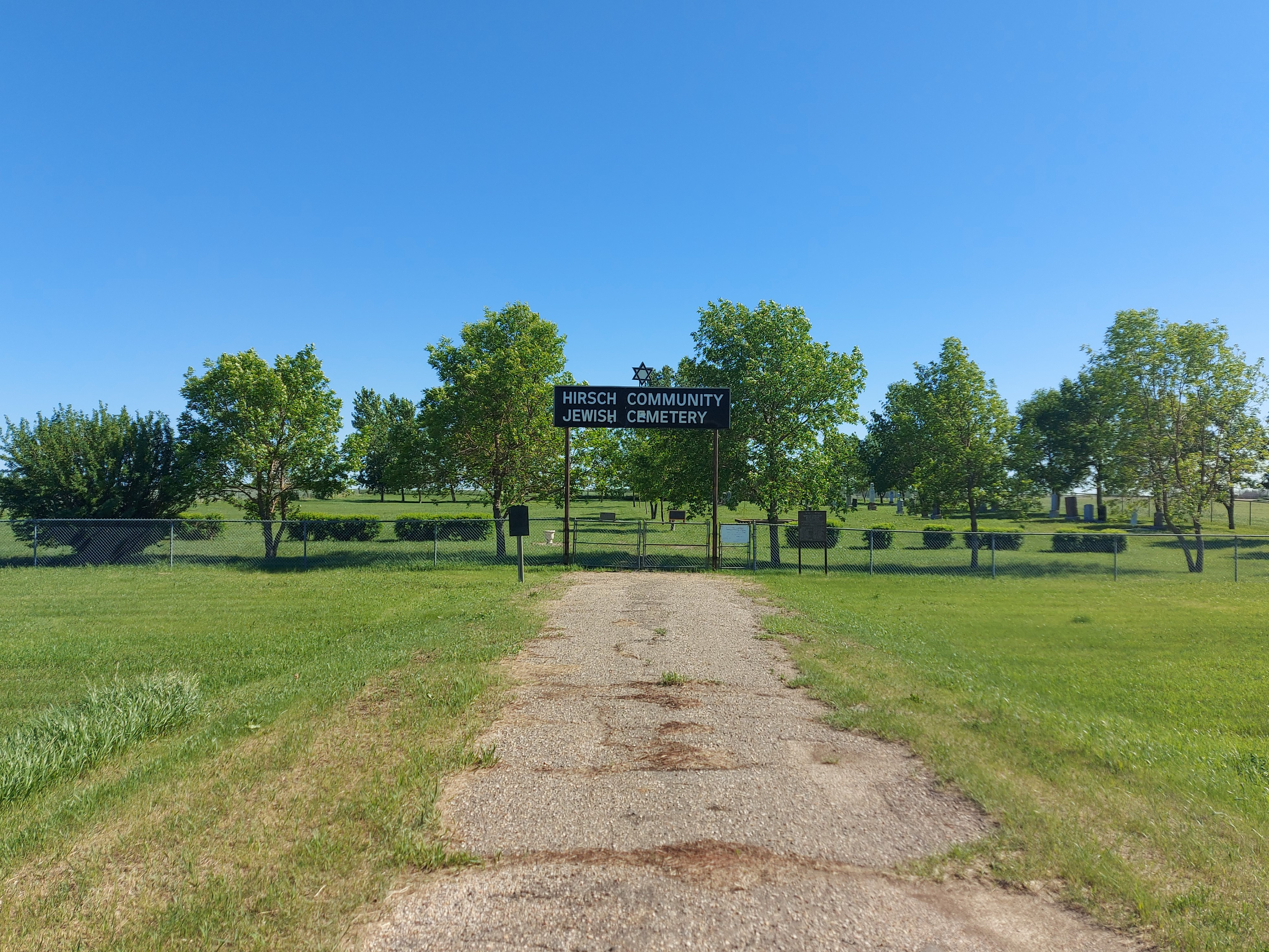
Hirsch Jewish Cemetery near Hirsch

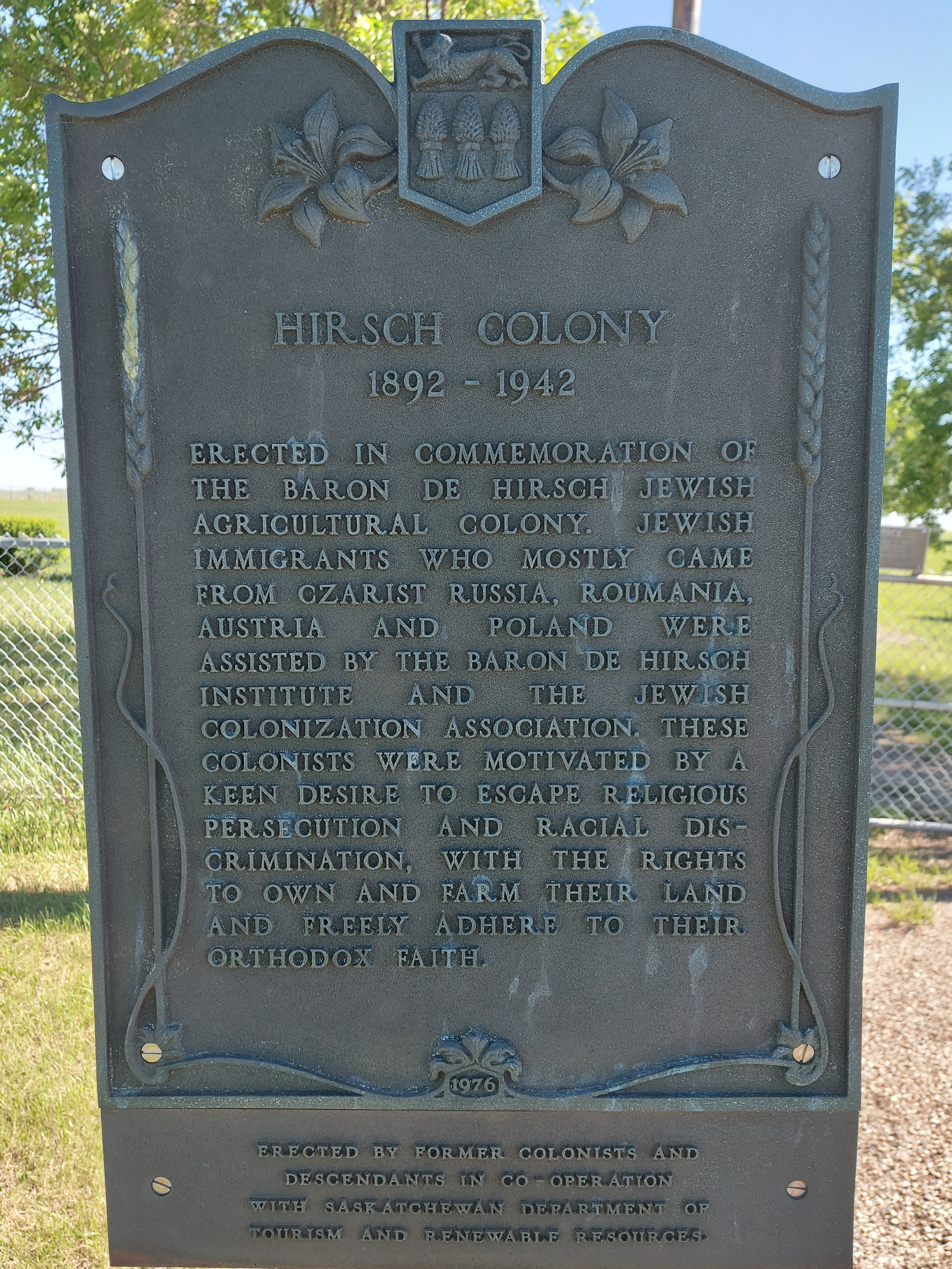
Plaque at Hirsch Cemetery

Hirsch was founded in May 1892 by Jewish settlers as part of the activities of the Baron Maurice de Hirsch Foundation and the Jewish Colonization Association (JCA). It was the first settlement of the JCA and was named after the founder of the foundation, one of the most important Jewish philanthropists of the 19th century.

In Hebrew religion and custom, the dead of the community are afforded great respect and a proper cemetery must be built before other needs are attended to. Therefore, even before the first synagogue was built, the early settlers were setting aside land for a cemetery. A colonist, Mr. Blank, paced off an acre of his quarter section for a cemetery. Almost ninety years after the first settlers arrived, descendants, neighbours, and friends of the Hirsch Colonists attended the consecration and designation of the Hirsch Cemetery as a Saskatchewan historic site. The Hirsch Jewish Cemetery can be found along Highway 18, just west of Hirsch. The original synagogue still exists but has been converted into a home.

During the Dust Bowl crisis of the 1930s, most Jewish families left Hirsch and moved to nearby Winnipeg.

The place is best known for the autobiography of Mrs. Zellickson (also: Zelickson), first name unknown, who immigrated in 1891 and wrote extensively about life on the prairies in 1925, especially about the role of women in it. In 1925 she responded to a discussion in the magazine Nor'-West Farmer on the topic of what a woman's work was worth.

== See also ==
- List of communities in Saskatchewan
- List of hamlets in Saskatchewan
- Jewish Colony
