= Roche Percee =

Village in Saskatchewan, Canada

- Village
- Location of Roche Percee Roche Percee (Canada)
- Coordinates: 49°02′27″N 102°28′50″W
- Country: Canada
- Province: Saskatchewan
- Region: Southeast
- Census division: Division No. 1
- Rural Municipality: Coalfields No. 4
- Post Office Established: August 1, 1890

Population (2021)
  - Total: 75
- Time zone: UTC−6 (CST)
- Area code: 306

Roche Percee /rɒʃ pərˈseɪ/ (2021 population: 75) is a village in the Canadian province of Saskatchewan within the RM of Coalfields No. 4 and Census Division No. 1. The village is near the Canada–United States border, just off Highway 39. Roche Percee is about 20 kilometres (12 mi) east of Estevan in the Souris River valley.

== History ==
=== Early settlement ===
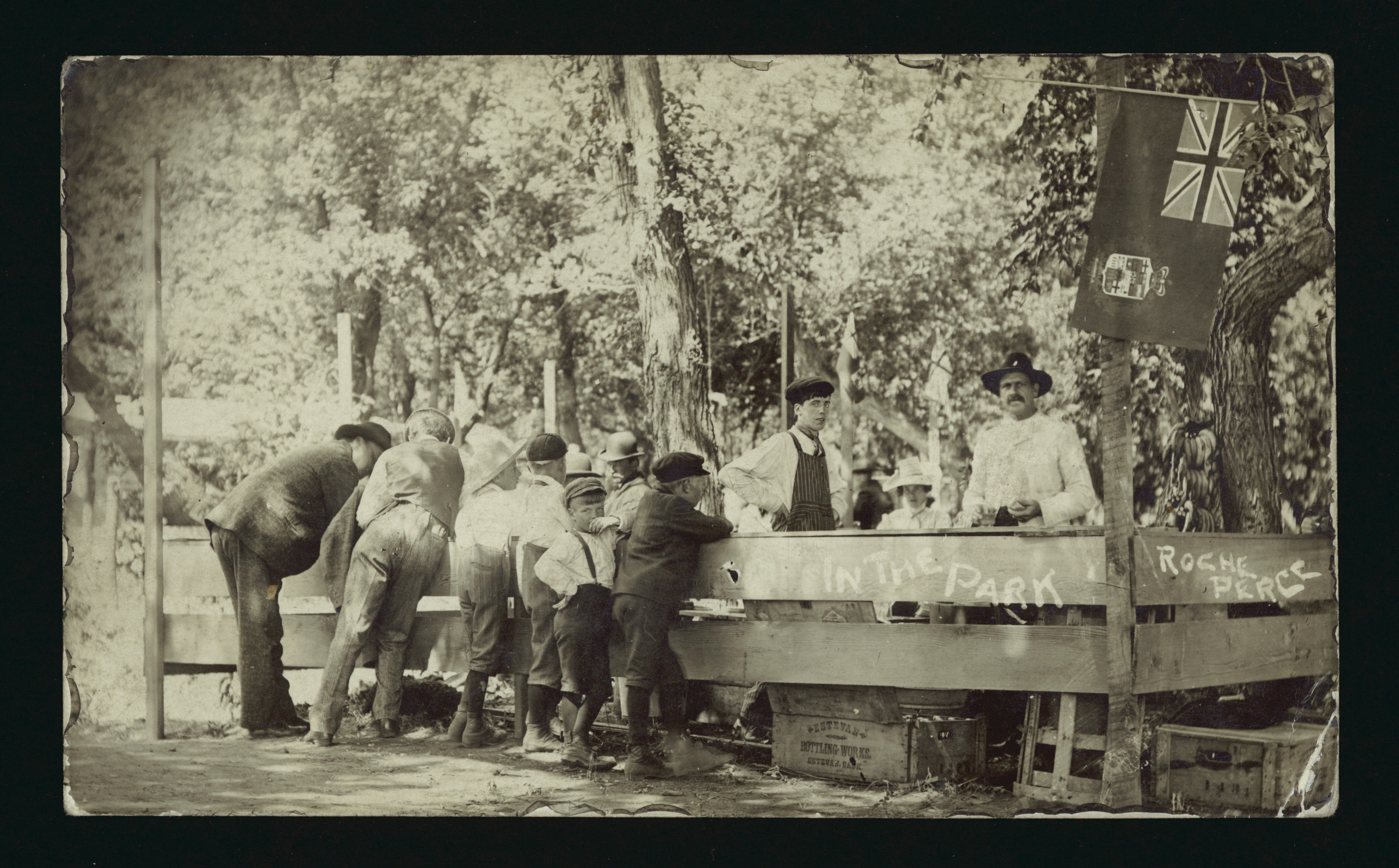
Postcard of a stall at Roche Percee Park, c. 1910 to 1925

In 1872, the Boundary Commission travelled through this area while surveying the Canada–United States border between Canada and the United States. During the 1874 March West trek of the North-West Mounted Police, the force established its first camp (called Short Creek Camp) at this location. Short Creek is a tributary of the Souris River and it meets the river on the west side of Roche Percee.

In 1890, the federal government opened a post office serving the Roche Percee area, under the name of "Coalfields". Renamed "Roche Percée" in 1896, it closed in 1897, but re-opened in 1905. It permanently closed in 1970.

The community began being served by the Soo Line in 1893, permitting the coal mines in the region to become operational. Roche Percee incorporated as a village on January 12, 1909.

=== Rock formations ===
La Roche Percee Provincial Historic Site is located nearby. Referred to by local residents as "the Rocks", it has large sandstone deposits in which some caves have formed. The name of the village comes from the Métis French name of the rock formations. Another similar formation Percé Rock is in Quebec.

In 2010, the provincial government signed an agreement with Southeast Tour & Trails Inc. to restore Roche Percee Park after being closed for over a decade.

=== 2011 Flood ===
In 2011, flooding on the Souris River inundated the village, forcing its residents to evacuate. Of the 64 homes in Roche Percee, 28 were damaged beyond repair, and had to be demolished.

== Demographics ==
Population history (1981–2016)
Year	Pop.	±%
1981	142	—
1986	159	+12.0%
1991	154	−3.1%
1996	149	−3.2%
2001	162	+8.7%
2006	149	−8.0%
2011	153	+2.7%
2016	110	−28.1%
Source: Statistics Canada via Saskatchewan Bureau of Statistics

In the 2021 Census of Population conducted by Statistics Canada, Roche Percee had a population of 75 living in 36 of its 48 total private dwellings, a change of −31.8% from its 2016 population of 110. With a land area of 2.87 km^{2} (1.11 sq mi), it had a population density of 26.1/km^{2} (67.7/sq mi) in 2021.

In the 2016 Census of Population, the Village of Roche Percee recorded a population of 110 living in 45 of its 50 total private dwellings, a −39.1% change from its 2011 population of 153. With a land area of 2.83 km^{2} (1.09 sq mi), it had a population density of 38.9/km^{2} (100.7/sq mi) in 2016.

== Gallery ==
Plaque at Roche Percee

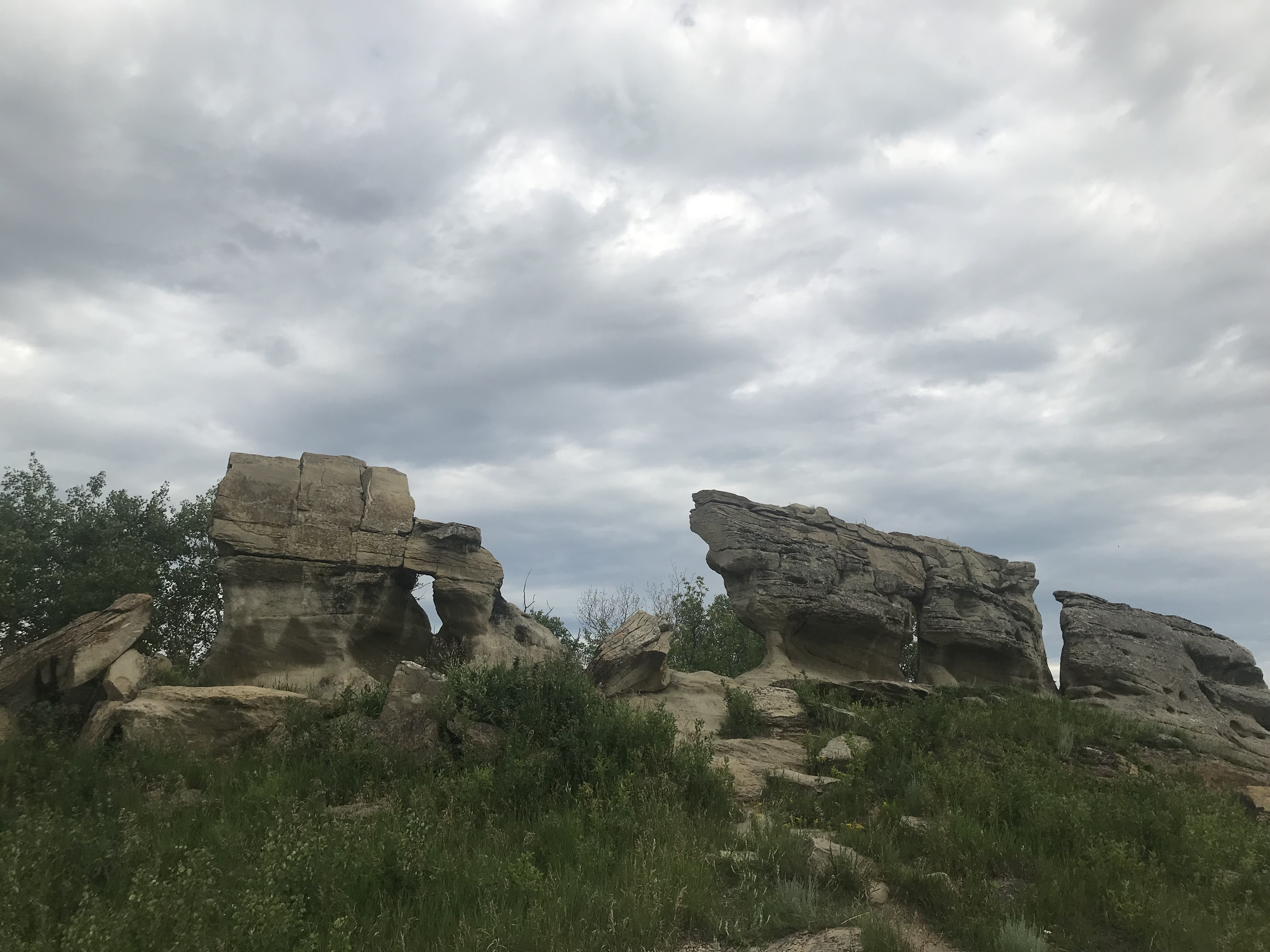
Entry at Roche Percee

Cave at Roche Percee

View from the top at Roche Percee

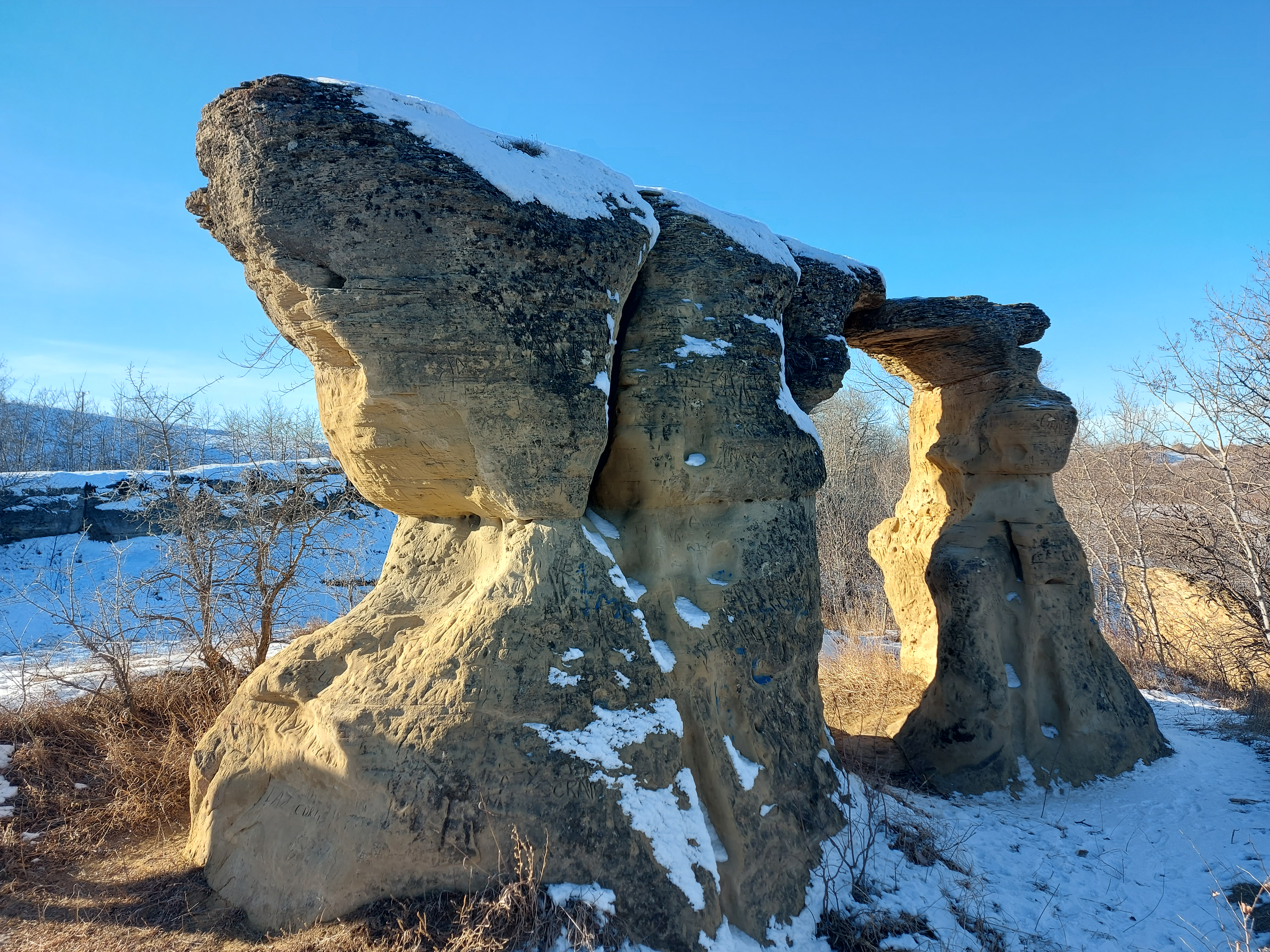
The rocks of Roche Percee in winter

== See also ==
- List of villages in Saskatchewan
- Roche Percee Recreation Site
