= Ocean Man 69X =

Indian reserve in Saskatchewan, Canada

Coordinates: 49°49′55″N 102°56′57″W

- Indian reserve
- Ocean Man Indian Reserve No. 69X
- Location in Saskatchewan
- First Nation: Ocean Man
- Country: Canada
- Province: Saskatchewan

Area
  - Total: 64.7 ha (160 acres)

Ocean Man 69X is an Indian reserve of the Ocean Man First Nation in Saskatchewan.

== See also ==
- List of Indian reserves in Saskatchewan
