= Ocean Man 69S =

Indian reserve in Saskatchewan, Canada

Coordinates: 49°48′28″N 102°53′19″W

- Indian reserve
- Ocean Man Indian Reserve No. 69S
- Location in Saskatchewan
- First Nation: Ocean Man
- Country: Canada
- Province: Saskatchewan

Area
  - Total: 194.6 ha (481 acres)

Ocean Man 69S is an Indian reserve of the Ocean Man First Nation in Saskatchewan.

== See also ==
- List of Indian reserves in Saskatchewan
