= Big 6 Hockey League =

Ice hockey league in Saskatchewan, Canada

- Current season, competition or edition: 2026–27
- Sport: Ice hockey
- Founded: 1959
- First season: 1959–60
- President: Dustin Graham
- No. of teams: 9
- Country: Canada
- Region: Saskatchewan
- Most recent champion: Moosomin Rangers (3rd title)
- Most titles: Bienfait Coalers (15)
- Website: www.bigsixhockey.com

The Big 6 Hockey League is a senior men's ice hockey league in south-eastern Saskatchewan, Canada. As of the 2026–27 season, there are nine teams in the league. The league began in 1959–60 with four teams: the Bienfait Coalers, Frobisher Flyers, Glen Ewen Eagles, and Oxbow Aces.

The teams compete for the Lincoln Trophy. The Bienfait Coalers have been the most successful team in league history with 15 championships.

Select regular season and playoff games from around the league are broadcast on Estevan radio station CJSL.

== Teams ==
=== Current teams ===
Current teams as of the 2026–27 season.

Team	City	Arena	Joined	Most recent title
Carlyle Cougars	Carlyle, Saskatchewan	Carlyle Sports Arena	1965	2000–01
Carnduff Red Devils	Carnduff, Saskatchewan	Carnduff Centennial Arena	1969	2021–22
Kipling/Windthorst Oil Kings	Kipling, Saskatchewan	Kipling Arena	2018	0 titles
Midale Mustangs	Midale, Saskatchewan	Harry O. Memorial Arena	2004	2009–10
Moosomin Rangers	Moosomin, Saskatchewan	Mike Schwean Arena	2021	2025–26
Oxbow Huskies	Oxbow, Saskatchewan	Oxbow Arena	2004	0 titles
Redvers Rockets	Redvers, Saskatchewan	Redvers Recreation Centre	2004	2024–25
Wawota Flyers	Wawota, Saskatchewan	Wawota Forum	2003	2016–17
Bienfait Coalers	Bienfait, Saskatchewan	Bienfait Memorial Arena	2026	2014–15

Teams of the Big 6 Hockey League

Wawota Flyers: Team initially joined in 1971, but disbanded and rejoined in 2003
Bienfait Coalers: Team initially joined in 1959, but disbanded in 2024 and rejoined in the 2026 season

== Defunct teams ==
- Arcola/Kisbey Combines
- Estevan Bears
- Frobisher Oil Kings
- Lampman Imperials
- Midale Miners
- Oxbow Aces
- Storthoaks Red Wings
- White Bear Eagles
- Weyburn Devils
- Yellow Grass Wheat Kings

== Championships ==
Year	Winning team	Losing team	Games	Notes
1959–60	Bienfait Coalers	Frobisher Oil Kings	3–1	
1960–61	Midale Miners	Bienfait Coalers	3–0	
1961–62	Bienfait Coalers	Frobisher Oil Kings	3–1	1 Tie
1962–63	Bienfait Coalers	Frobisher Oil Kings	3–1	
1963–64	Arcola / Kisbey Combines	Oxbow Aces	3–0	
1964–65	Arcola / Kisbey Combines	Bienfait Coalers	3–2	
1965–66	Carlyle Cougars	Arcola / Kisbey Combines	3–1	
1966–67	Arcola / Kisbey Combines	Carlyle Cougars	3–1	
1967–68	Arcola / Kisbey Combines	Storthoaks Red Wings	3–0	
1968–69	Carlyle Cougars	Bienfait Coalers	3–1	
1968–70	Carnduff Red Devils	Storthoaks Red Wings	4–0	
1970–71	Bienfait Coalers	Carlyle Cougars	3–1	
1971–72	Wawota Flyers	Carlyle Cougars	3–1	
1972–73	Wawota Flyers	Arcola / Kisbey Combines	3–0	
1973–74	Wawota Flyers	Carnduff Red Devils	4–1	
1974–75	Wawota Flyers	Bienfait Coalers	3–2	
1975–76	Bienfait Coalers	Wawota Flyers	3–2	
1976–77	Bienfait Coalers	Carnduff Red Devils	3–2	
1977–78	Bienfait Coalers	Wawota Flyers	3–0	
1978–79	Carnduff Red Devils	Wawota Flyers	4–0	
1979–80	Carnduff Red Devils	Wawota Flyers	3–0	
1980–81	Lampman Imperials	Wawota Flyers	3–0	
1981–82	Wawota Flyers	Arcola / Kisbey Combines	4–3	
1982–83	Bienfait Coalers	Midale Mustangs	4–2	
1983–84	Carnduff Red Devils	Bienfait Coalers	4–0	
1984–85	Estevan Bears	Bienfait Coalers	4–1	
1985–86	Estevan Bears	Arcola / Kisbey Combines	4–1	
1986–87	Estevan Bears	Carlyle Cougars	4–0	
1987–88	Carnduff Red Devils	Arcola / Kisbey Combines	4–2	
1988–89	Carlyle Cougars	Carnduff Red Devils	4–1	
1989–90	Carnduff Red Devils	Arcola / Kisbey Combines	4–0	
1990–91	Carnduff Red Devils	Carlyle Cougars	4–0	
1991–92	Carlyle Cougars	Carnduff Red Devils	4–2	
1992–93	Carnduff Red Devils	Carlyle Cougars	4–3	
1993–94	Carnduff Red Devils	Bienfait Coalers	4–0	
1994–95	Carlyle Cougars	Carnduff Red Devils	4–1	
1995–96	Bienfait Coalers	Carlyle Cougars	4–1	
1996–97	Carlyle Cougars	Bienfait Coalers	4–0	
1997–98	Arcola / Kisbey Combines	White Bear Eagles	4–2	
1998–99	Carlyle Cougars	Bienfait Coalers	4–2	
1999–2000	Carlyle Cougars			
2000–01	Carlyle Cougars			
2001–02	Bienfait Coalers			
2002–03	Weyburn Devils	Moosomin Rangers		
2003–04	Moosomin Rangers			
2004–05	Wawota Flyers	Weyburn Devils		
2005–06	Weyburn Devils	Wawota Flyers	3–2	
2006–07	Carnduff Red Devils	Carlyle Cougars	4–3	
2007–08	Midale Mustangs	Carnduff Red Devils	4–1	
2008–09	Midale Mustangs	Redvers Rockets	4–1	
2009–10	Midale Mustangs	Bienfait Coalers	4–0	
2010–11	Bienfait Coalers	Midale Mustangs	4–3	
2011–12	Bienfait Coalers	Midale Mustangs	4–2	
2012–13	Bienfait Coalers	Arcola / Kisbey Combines	4–0	
2013–14	Bienfait Coalers	Midale Mustangs	4–0	
2014–15	Bienfait Coalers	Wawota Flyers	4–1	
2015–16	Wawota Flyers	Bienfait Coalers	4–1	
2016–17	Wawota Flyers	Yellow Grass Wheat Kings	4–0	
2017–18	Redvers Rockets	Carnduff Red Devils	3–0	
2018–19	Yellow Grass Wheat Kings	Carnduff Red Devils	3–0	
2019–20	Carnduff Red Devils vs Redvers Rockets			Championship cancelled due to COVID-19
2020–21				Season cancelled due to COVID-19
2021–22	Carnduff Red Devils	Redvers Rockets	3–1	
2022–23	Redvers Rockets	Moosomin Rangers	3–0	
2023–24	Moosomin Rangers	Redvers Rockets	3–0	
2024–25	Redvers Rockets	Moosomin Rangers	3–0	
2025–26	Moosomin Rangers	Redvers Rockets	3–2	

== See also ==
- List of ice hockey leagues
- Highway Hockey League
- Sport in Saskatchewan § Team sports
