= Ocean Man 69A =

Indian reserve in Saskatchewan, Canada

Coordinates: 49°53′46″N 103°09′17″W

- Indian reserve
- Ocean Man Indian Reserve No. 69A
- Location in Saskatchewan
- First Nation: Ocean Man
- Country: Canada
- Province: Saskatchewan

Area
  - Total: 257.2 ha (636 acres)

Population (2016)
  - Total: 0
  - Density: 0.0/km^{2} (0.0/sq mi)

Ocean Man 69A is an Indian reserve of the Ocean Man First Nation in Saskatchewan. In the 2016 Canadian Census, it recorded a population of 0 living in 0 of its 0 total private dwellings.

== See also ==
- List of Indian reserves in Saskatchewan
