= Ocean Man 69 =

Indian reserve in Saskatchewan, Canada

Coordinates: 49°50′44″N 103°04′10″W

- Indian reserve
- Ocean Man Indian Reserve No. 69
- Location in Saskatchewan
- First Nation: Ocean Man
- Country: Canada
- Province: Saskatchewan

Area
  - Total: 1,937.9 ha (4,789 acres)

Population (2016)
  - Total: 185
  - Density: 9.55/km^{2} (24.7/sq mi)
- Community Well-Being Index: 48

Ocean Man 69 is an Indian reserve of the Ocean Man First Nation in Saskatchewan. It is about 20 kilometres (12 mi) north-east of Stoughton. In the 2016 Canadian Census, it recorded a population of 185 living in 56 of its 61 total private dwellings. In the same year, its Community Well-Being index was calculated at 48 of 100, compared to 58.4 for the average First Nations community and 77.5 for the average non-Indigenous community.

== See also ==
- List of Indian reserves in Saskatchewan
