= Ocean Man 69H =

Indian reserve in Saskatchewan, Canada

Coordinates: 49°51′25″N 102°52′17″W

- Indian reserve
- Ocean Man Indian Reserve No. 69H
- Location in Saskatchewan
- First Nation: Ocean Man
- Country: Canada
- Province: Saskatchewan

Area
  - Total: 616.1 ha (1,522 acres)

Population (2016)
  - Total: 5
  - Density: 0.81/km^{2} (2.1/sq mi)

Ocean Man 69H is an Indian reserve of the Ocean Man First Nation in Saskatchewan. In the 2016 Canadian Census, it recorded a population of 5 living in 3 of its 3 total private dwellings.

== See also ==
- List of Indian reserves in Saskatchewan
