= Ocean Man 69I =

Indian reserve in Saskatchewan, Canada

Coordinates: 49°51′53″N 102°54′52″W

- Indian reserve
- Ocean Man Indian Reserve No. 69I
- Location in Saskatchewan
- First Nation: Ocean Man
- Country: Canada
- Province: Saskatchewan

Area
  - Total: 131.1 ha (324 acres)

Population (2016)
  - Total: 5
  - Density: 3.8/km^{2} (9.9/sq mi)

Ocean Man 69I is an Indian reserve of the Ocean Man First Nation in Saskatchewan. In the 2016 Canadian Census, it recorded a population of 5 living in 1 of its 1 total private dwellings.

== See also ==
- List of Indian reserves in Saskatchewan
