= Ocean Man 69C =

Indian reserve in Saskatchewan, Canada

Coordinates: 49°52′35″N 103°03′18″W

- Indian reserve
- Ocean Man Indian Reserve No. 69C
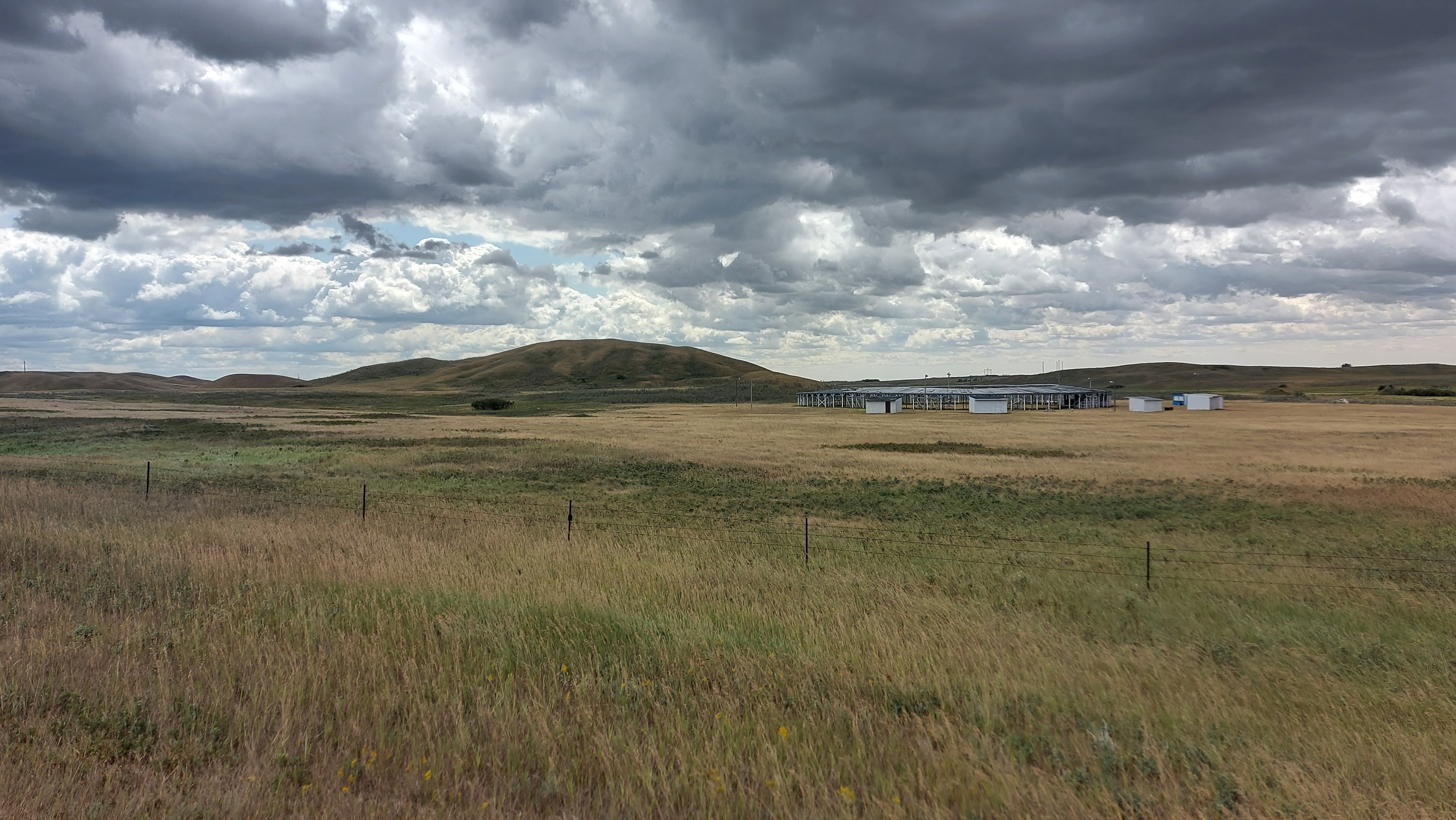
- Lost Horse Hills on the reserve

- Location in Saskatchewan
- First Nation: Ocean Man
- Country: Canada
- Province: Saskatchewan

Area
  - Total: 299.7 ha (741 acres)

Population (2016)
  - Total: 0
  - Density: 0.0/km^{2} (0.0/sq mi)

Ocean Man 69C is an Indian reserve of the Ocean Man First Nation in Saskatchewan. In the 2016 Canadian Census, it recorded a population of 0 living in 0 of its 0 total private dwellings.

== See also ==
- List of Indian reserves in Saskatchewan
