= Rural Municipality of Coalfields No. 4 =

Rural municipality in Saskatchewan, Canada

Coalfields No. 4
- Rural municipality
- Rural Municipality of Coalfields No. 4
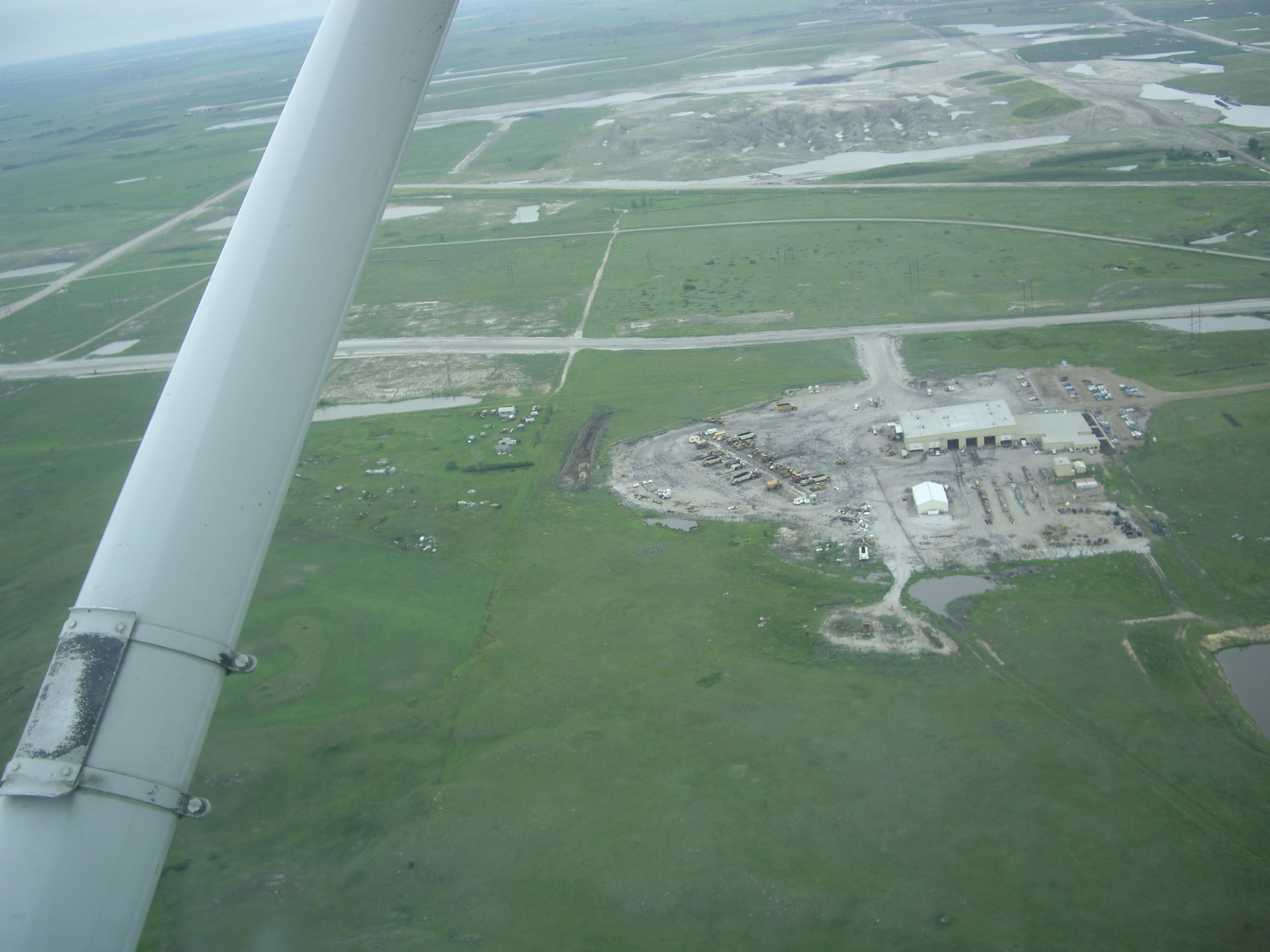

- Location of the RM of Coalfields No. 4 in Saskatchewan
- Coordinates: 49.150°N 102.657°W
- Country: Canada
- Province: Saskatchewan
- Census division: 1
- SARM division: 1
- Federal riding: Souris—Moose Mountain
- Provincial riding: Estevan
- Formed: January 1, 1913

Government
  - Reeve: Arnold Jahn
  - Governing body: RM of Coalfields No. 4 Council
  - Administrator: Monica Kovach
  - Office location: Bienfait

Area (2021)
  - Land: 818.16 km^{2} (315.89 sq mi)

Population (2021)
  - Total: 330
  - Density: 0.4/km^{2} (1.0/sq mi)
- Time zone: CST
  - Summer (DST): CST
- Postal code: S0C 0M0
- Area codes: 306 and 639
- Website: rmofcoalfields.com

The Rural Municipality of Coalfields No. 4 (2016 population: 368) is a rural municipality (RM) in the Canadian province of Saskatchewan within Census Division No. 1 and SARM Division No. 1. Located in the southeast portion of the province, it is adjacent to the United States, neighbouring Burke County, North Dakota.

== History ==
The RM of Coalfields No. 4 was incorporated as a rural municipality on January 1, 1913.

== Geography ==
The Souris River is the only major river in the RM. It travels from Roche Percée in the west straight across to the east into the neighbouring RM of Enniskillen No. 3. There are no notable lakes in the RM of Coalfields.

=== Communities and localities ===
The following urban municipalities are surrounded by the RM.

Towns:

- Bienfait

Villages:

- Frobisher
- North Portal
- Roche Percee

The following unincorporated communities are within the RM:

- Deborah
- Hirsch
- Pinto
- Taylorton

== Transportation ==
The two major highways to travers the RM of Coalfields No. 4 are Highway 18 and Highway 39. Municipal highways include Highway 604, Highway 605, Highway 703, and Highway 704.

== Demographics ==
Population history
Year	Pop.	±%
1981	494	—
1986	498	+0.8%
1991	440	−11.6%
1996	419	−4.8%
2001	415	−1.0%
2006	396	−4.6%
2011	382	−3.5%
2016	368	−3.7%
2021	330	−10.3%
Source: Statistics Canada via Saskatchewan Bureau of Statistics

In the 2021 Census of Population conducted by Statistics Canada, the RM of Coalfields No. 4 had a population of 330 living in 133 of its 157 total private dwellings, a change of −10.3% from its 2016 population of 368. With a land area of 818.16 km^{2} (315.89 sq mi), it had a population density of 0.4/km^{2} (1.0/sq mi) in 2021.

In the 2016 Census of Population, the RM of Coalfields No. 4 recorded a population of 368 living in 148 of its 183 total private dwellings, a −3.7% change from its 2011 population of 382. With a land area of 819.52 km^{2} (316.42 sq mi), it had a population density of 0.4/km^{2} (1.2/sq mi) in 2016.

== Government ==
The RM of Coalfields No. 4 is governed by an elected municipal council and an appointed administrator that meets on the third Thursday of every month. The reeve of the RM is Arnold Jahn. The councillors are as follows: Division 1 - Heather Brokenshire, Division 2 - Brett McKenzie, Division 3 - Jody Dukart, Division 4 - Braden McKnight, Division 5 - Dalan Wheeler, Division 6 - Terry Sernick. The administrator is Monica Kovach. The RM's office is in Bienfait.

== Roche Percee Recreation Site ==
Roche Percee Recreation Site (49.0762°N 102.7485°W) is a provincial campground in the RM of Coalfields along the Souris River. The park is treed and has a campground with 13 campsites and three picnic areas. The campground has non-electric sites, non-potable water, sewer disposal, and portable toilets. It is downstream and east of the village of Roche Percee and access is from Highway 39.

== Gallery ==
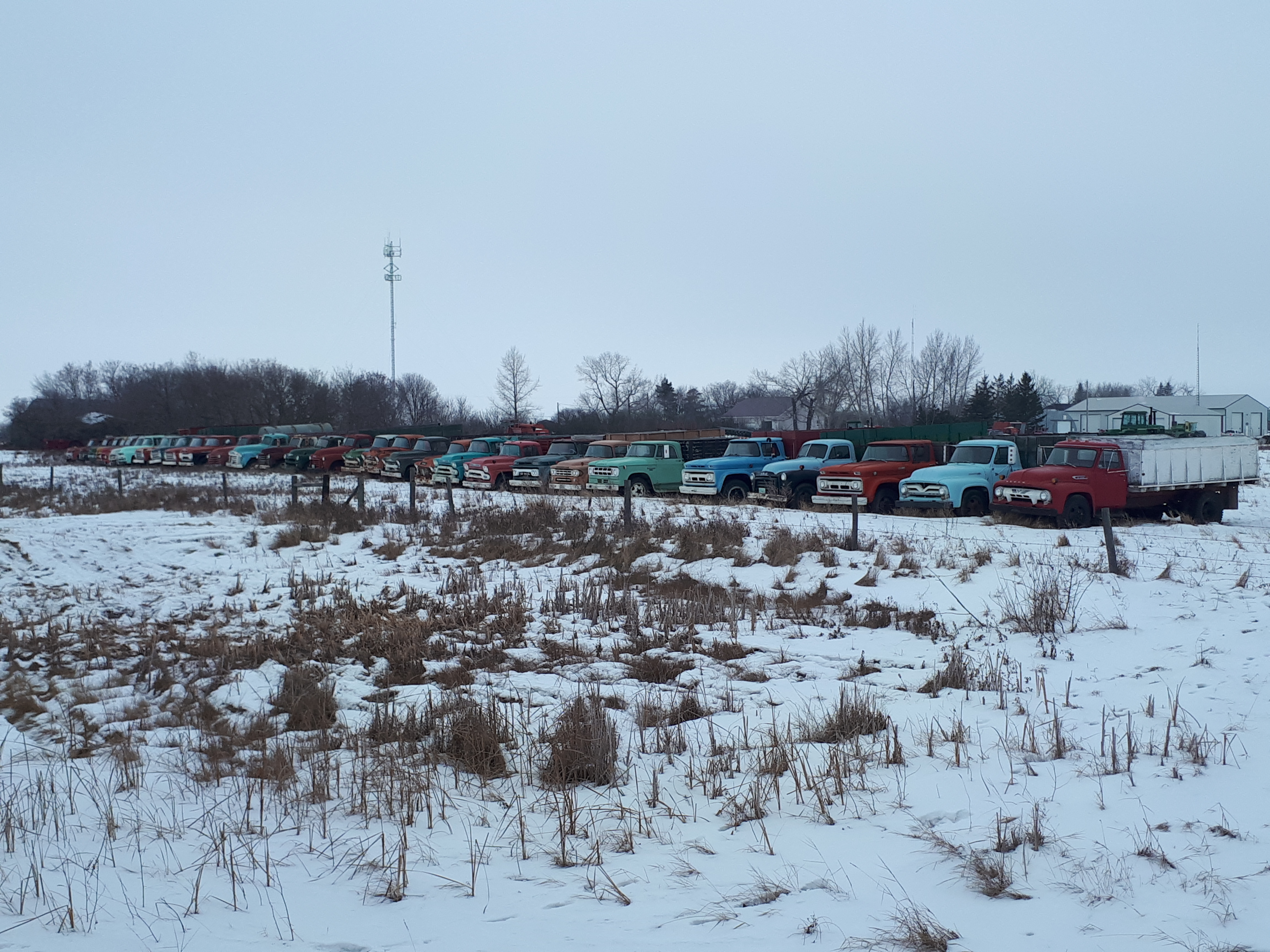
Old cars lined up near Hirsch

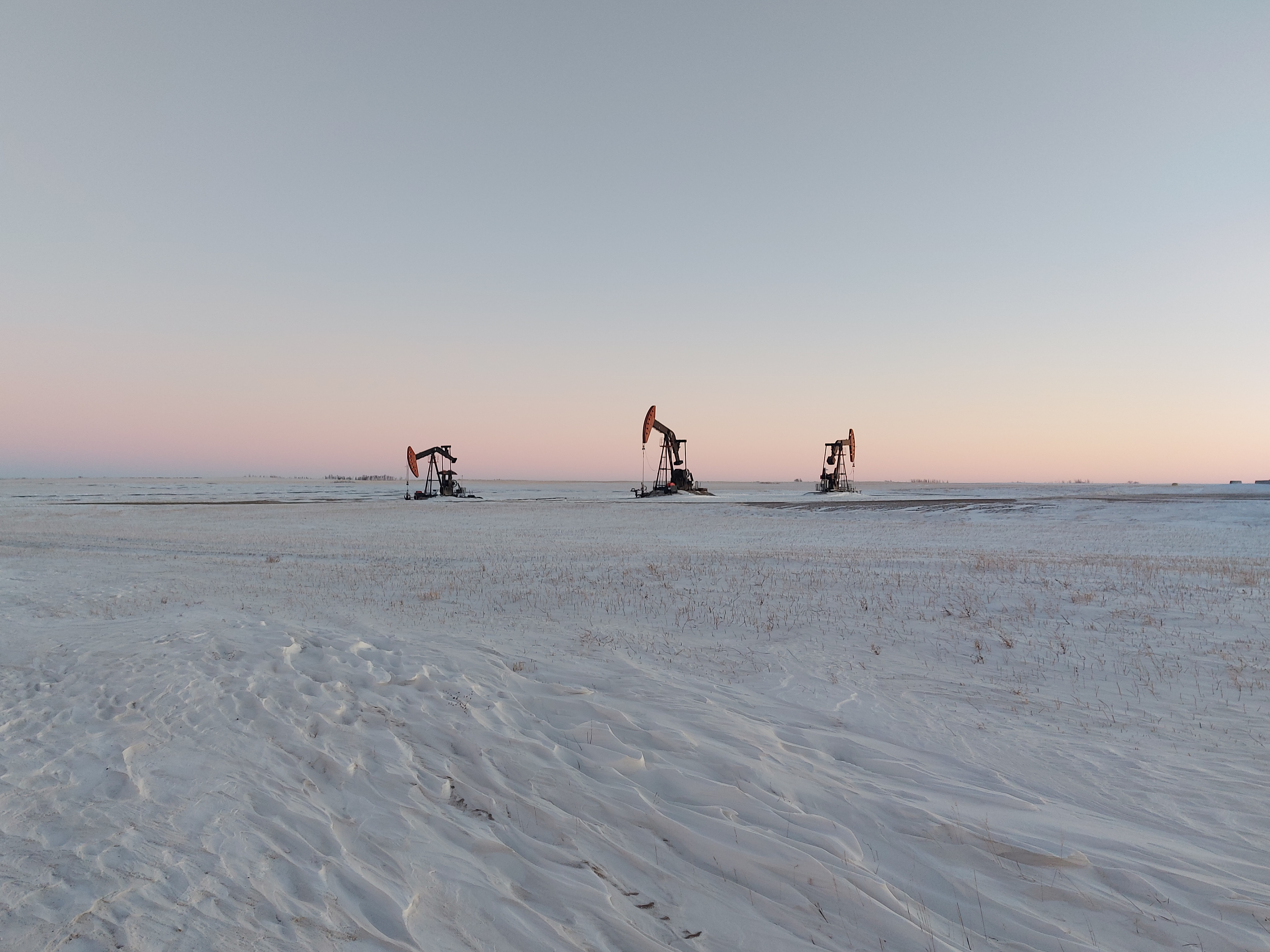
Pumpjacks at dusk on New Year's Day 2022

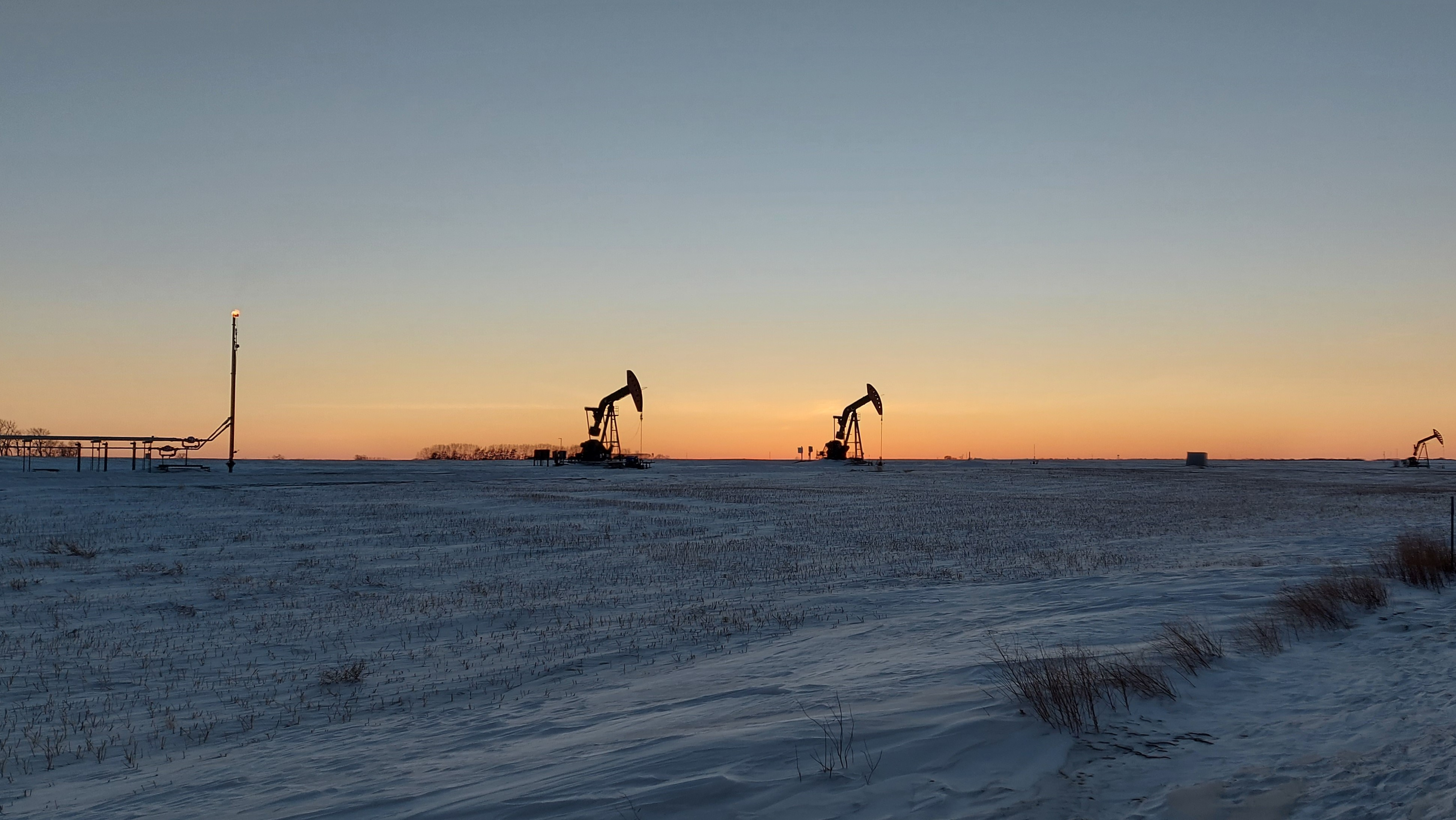
Silhouettes of pumpjacks at dusk on New Year's Day 2022

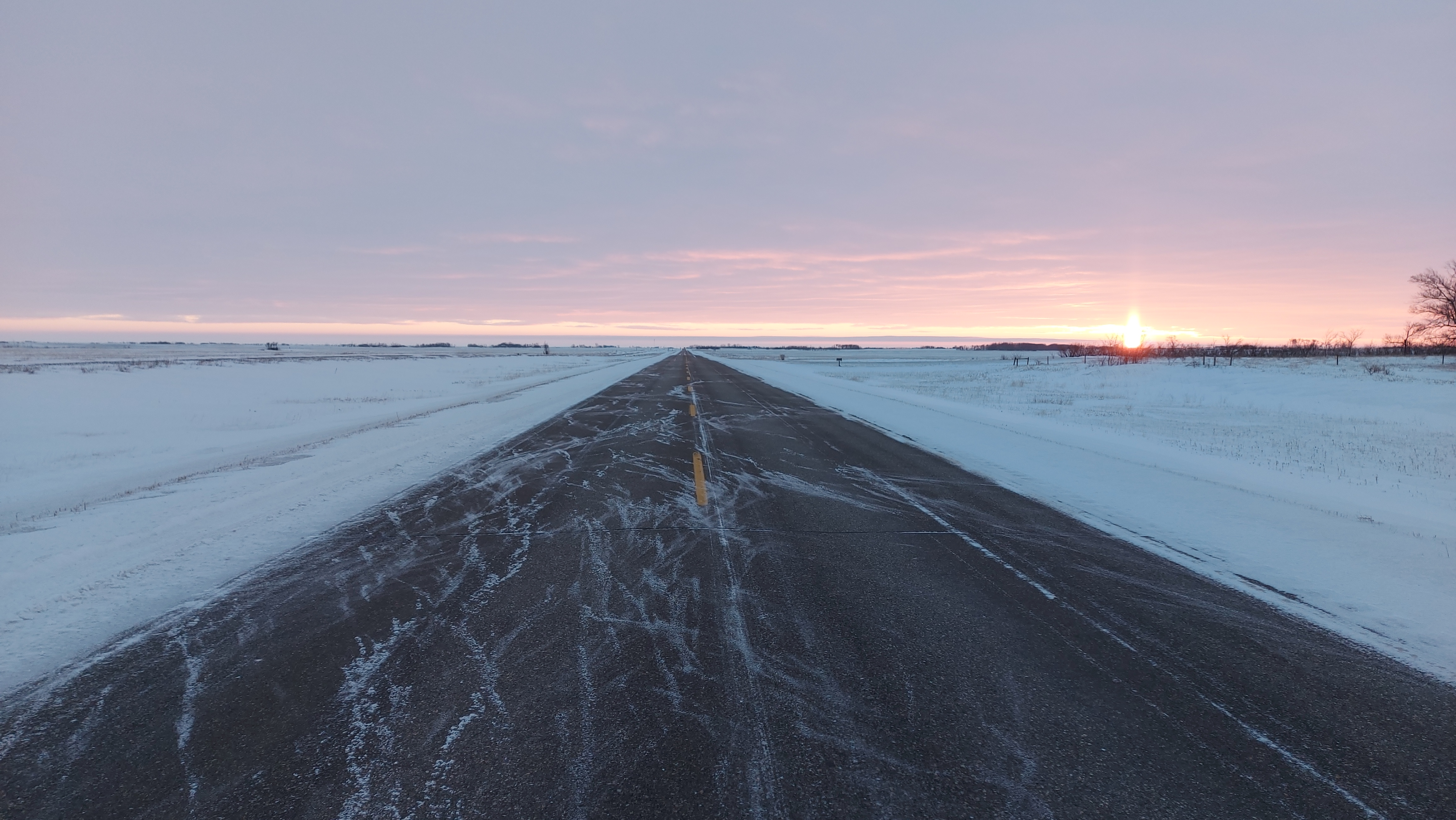
Highway 18 at dawn in winter

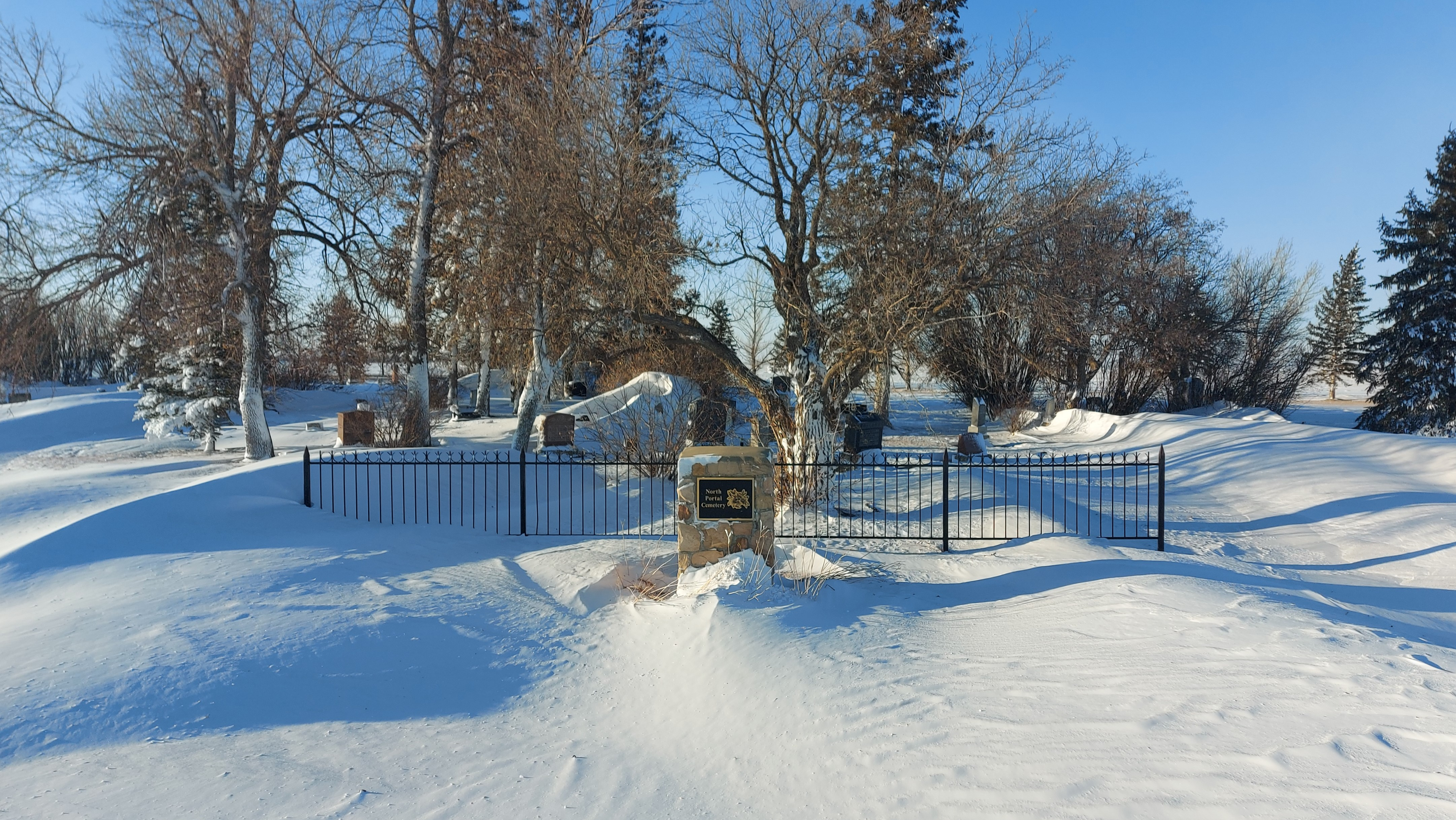
North Portal Cemetery

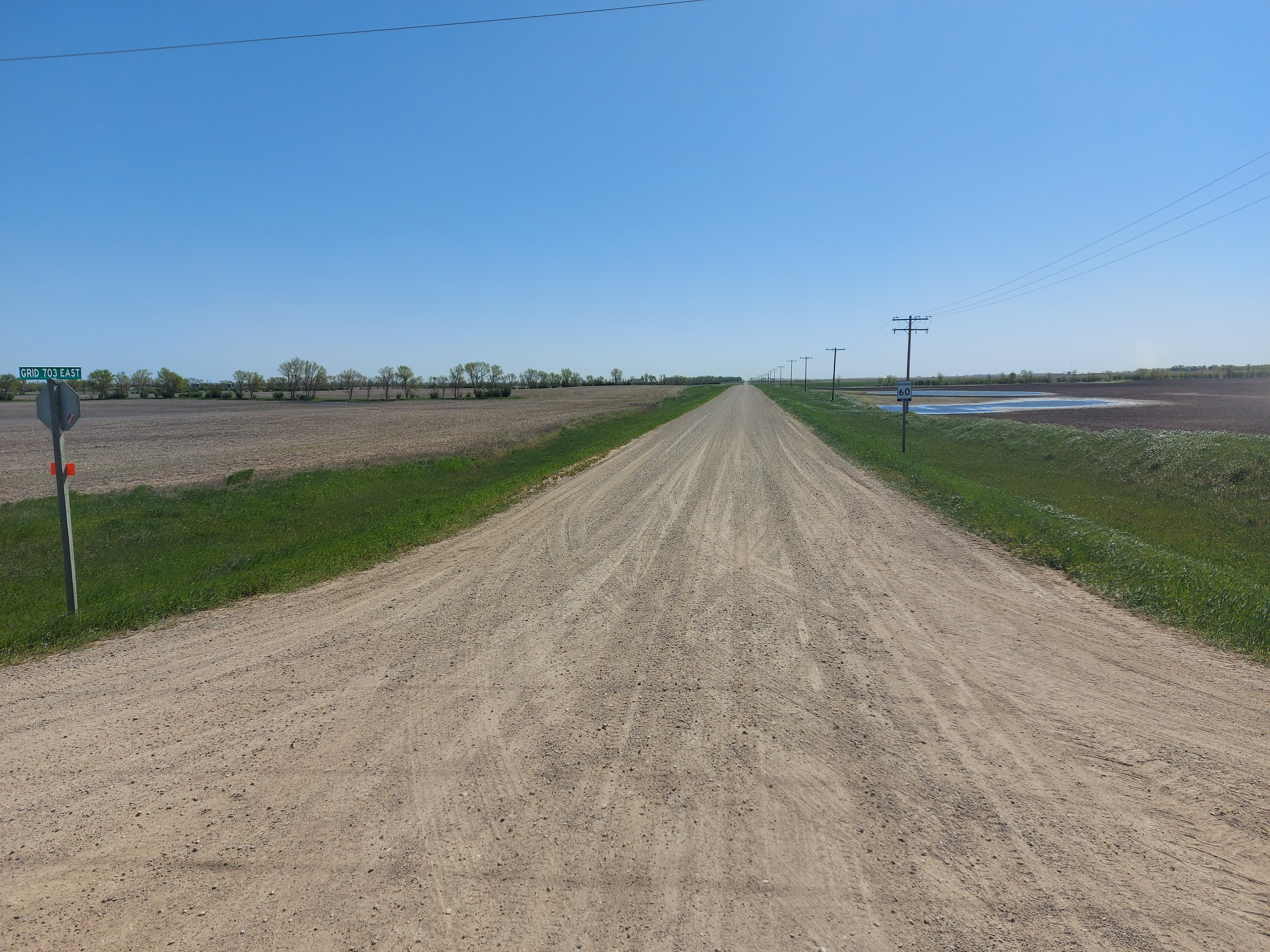
Highway 703 intersecting 604

== See also ==
- List of rural municipalities in Saskatchewan
- Coal mining in Saskatchewan
