= Frobisher, Saskatchewan =

Village in Saskatchewan, Canada

Frobisher
- Village
- Village of Frobisher
- Downtown Frobisher

- Location of Frobisher in Saskatchewan Frobisher (Canada)
- Coordinates: 49.200°N 102.450°W
- Country: Canada
- Province: Saskatchewan
- Region: Southeast
- Census division: 1
- Rural Municipality: Coalfields No. 4
- Post office Founded: 1902-02-01

Government
  - Type: Municipal
  - Governing body: Frobisher Village Council
  - Mayor: Kyla MacCuish
  - Administrator: Holley Odgers
  - MLA: Dan D'Autremont
  - MP: Robert Kitchen

Area
  - Total: 1.35 km^{2} (0.52 sq mi)

Population (2016)
  - Total: 160
  - Density: 118.5/km^{2} (307/sq mi)
- Time zone: UTC-6 (CST)
- Postal code: S0C 0Y0
- Area code: 306
- Highways: Highway 18 Highway 604

Frobisher (2016 population: 160) is a village in the Canadian province of Saskatchewan within the Rural Municipality of Coalfields No. 4 and Census Division No. 1. It has an elevation of 576 metres (1,890 ft) above sea level.

Frobisher is located along Highway 18, in the heart of south-east Saskatchewan's oil patch. Many pumpjacks and oil batteries are found in the area. Within the village, there are oil field related businesses, a post office, a restaurant/convenience store, and Frobisher United Church.

== History ==
Frobisher was originally known as Frobyshire but due to an error in the original village plans, it had to be renamed. In 1903, there were four grain elevators, each with a capacity of 25,000 bushels, one of which still stands. Frobisher was built at the cross-roads of two rail lines, the Canadian Pacific Railway Souris Line and the Grand Trunk Regina-Boundary Branch Line. The Grand Trunk line was a Canadian National Railway line, which is now gone as CN had issued a notice of discontinuance for the section which went from Northgate to Lampman on 16 October 2007. Frobisher was incorporated as a village on July 4, 1904.

== Parks and recreation ==
The closest park to Frobisher is Moose Creek Regional Park, 27 kilometres east. The park is located along the east side of Grant Devine Reservoir.Frobisher has an ice rink, the Frobisher Flyers were among the four founding teams of the Big 6 Hockey League. The Flyers never won a championship.

== Demographics ==
Population history (1981–2016)
Year	Pop.	±%
1981	166	—
1986	187	+12.7%
1991	158	−15.5%
1996	165	+4.4%
2001	149	−9.7%
2006	145	−2.7%
2011	166	+14.5%
2016	160	−3.6%
Source: Statistics Canada via Saskatchewan Bureau of Statistics

In the 2021 Census of Population conducted by Statistics Canada, Frobisher had a population of 127 living in 54 of its 71 total private dwellings, a change of −20.6% from its 2016 population of 160. With a land area of 1.43 km^{2} (0.55 sq mi), it had a population density of 88.8/km^{2} (230.0/sq mi) in 2021.

In the 2016 Census of Population, the Village of Frobisher recorded a population of 160 living in 65 of its 88 total private dwellings, a −3.8% change from its 2011 population of 166. With a land area of 1.35 km^{2} (0.52 sq mi), it had a population density of 118.5/km^{2} (307.0/sq mi) in 2016.

== See also ==
- List of communities in Saskatchewan
- List of villages in Saskatchewan
