= Ocean Man 69E =

Indian reserve in Saskatchewan, Canada

Coordinates: 49°49′33″N 102°55′49″W

- Indian reserve
- Ocean Man Indian Reserve No. 69E
- Location in Saskatchewan
- First Nation: Ocean Man
- Country: Canada
- Province: Saskatchewan

Area
  - Total: 387.8 ha (958 acres)

Population (2016)
  - Total: 0
  - Density: 0.0/km^{2} (0.0/sq mi)

Ocean Man 69E is an Indian reserve of the Ocean Man First Nation in Saskatchewan. In the 2016 Canadian Census, it recorded a population of zero with no private dwellings.

== See also ==
- List of Indian reserves in Saskatchewan
