= Ocean Man 69B =

Indian reserve in Saskatchewan, Canada

Coordinates: 49°53′04″N 103°08′56″W

- Indian reserve
- Ocean Man Indian Reserve No. 69B
- Location in Saskatchewan
- First Nation: Ocean Man
- Country: Canada
- Province: Saskatchewan

Area
  - Total: 47.4 ha (117 acres)

Ocean Man 69B is an Indian reserve of the Ocean Man First Nation in Saskatchewan.

== See also ==
- List of Indian reserves in Saskatchewan
