= Ocean Man First Nation =

First Nations organization in Saskatchewan, Canada

- Band No. 408
- People: Nêhiyaw (Cree), Nakota (Assiniboine), Anishinaabe (Saulteaux)
- Treaty: Treaty 4
- Headquarters: Stoughton
- Province: Saskatchewan

Land
- Main reserve: Ocean Man 69
- Reserves: Ocean Man 69A; Ocean Man 69B; Ocean Man 69C; Ocean Man 69D; Ocean Man 69E; Ocean Man 69F; Ocean Man 69G; Ocean Man 69H; Ocean Man 69I; Ocean Man 69N; Ocean Man 69S; Ocean Man 69U; Ocean Man 69X
- Land area: 45.768 km^{2} (17.671 sq mi)

Population (2019)
- On reserve: 146
- Off reserve: 415
- Total population: 561

Government
- Chief: Ernest Standingready

Tribal Council
- Yorkton Tribal Administration

The Ocean Man First Nation (Cree: ᑭᐦᒋᑲᒦᐏᔨᐣ kihcikamîwiyin) is an Assiniboine, Cree, and Saulteaux band government in southeastern Saskatchewan, Canada. Chief Kitchi-Kah-Me-Win (Great Seaman or Ocean Man, also spelt Kicheekahmenin, Kickekamewin)(Cree: ᑭᐦᒋᑲᒦᐏᔨᐣ kihcikamîwiyin) signed Treaty 4 on September 9, 1875.

In 1901, Ocean Man band was forced to amalgamate with White Bear Reserve. In the 1970s Ocean Man descendants were part of a land claim launched against the federal government that saw the successful re-establishment of Ocean Man First Nation in September 1990.

The late Laura Big Eagle became the first Chief of the re-established Ocean Man and remained Chief until her last breath. In 1997, Ocean Man was the only First Nation in Canada with an elected all women Chief and Council. In September 2016, they became signatories to the Buffalo Treaty.

According to 2016 Statistics Canada "Population Profile", there were 215 on-reserve residents, about half of which were Cree, and about another half were Assiniboine.

== Reserves ==
- Ocean Man 69
- Ocean Man 69A
- Ocean Man 69B
- Ocean Man 69C
- Ocean Man 69D
- Ocean Man 69E
- Ocean Man 69F
- Ocean Man 69G
- Ocean Man 69H
- Ocean Man 69I
- Ocean Man 69N
- Ocean Man 69S
- Ocean Man 69U
- Ocean Man 69X
- Ocean Man 69Q (New land added to the First Nation, just outside Regina)
- Treaty Four Reserve Grounds 77 (shared between 33 First Nations)
