= Kisbey =

Village in Saskatchewan, Canada

- Village
- Village of Kisbey
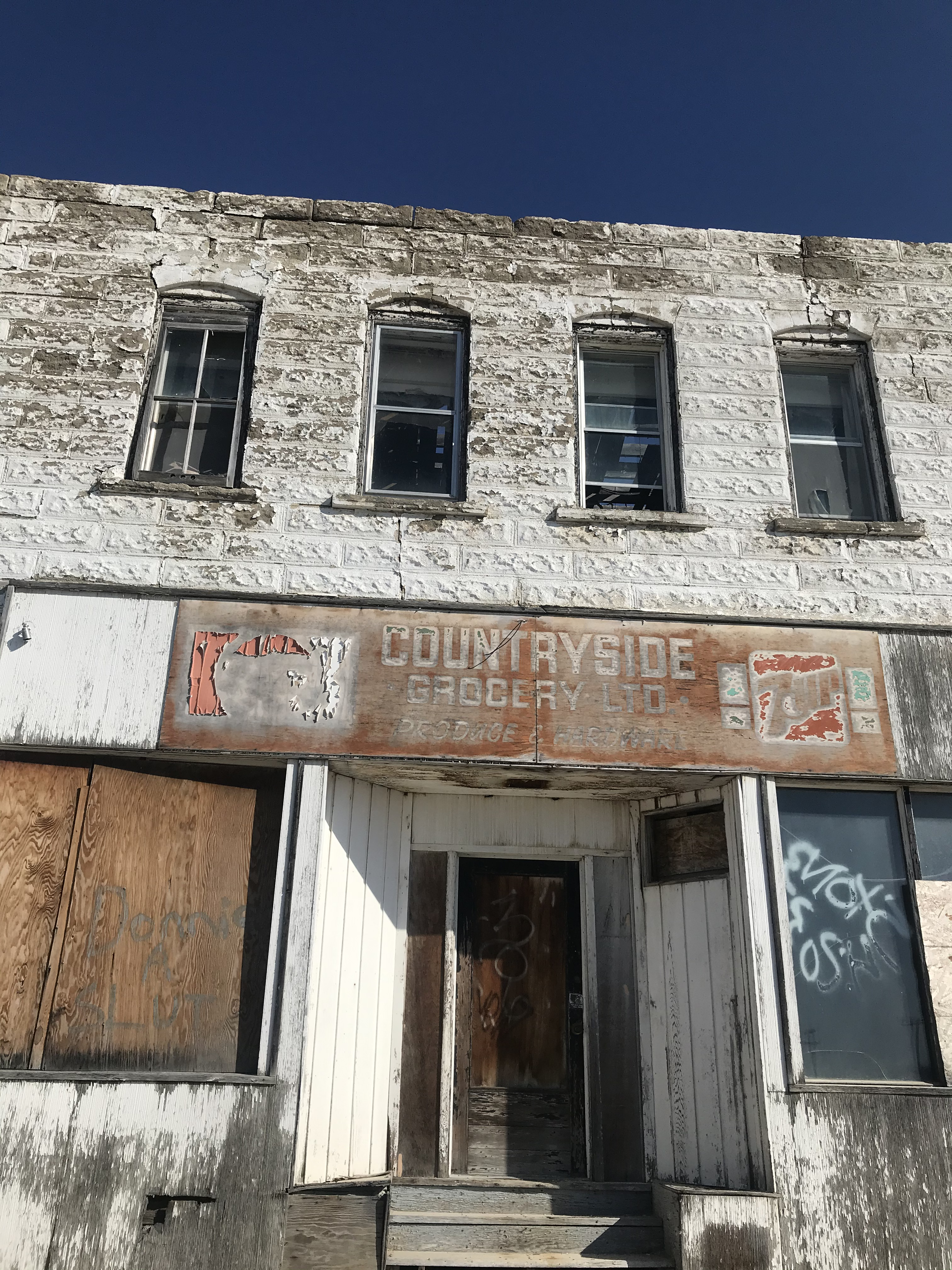
- Old storefront in Kisbey

- Location of Kisbey in Saskatchewan Kisbey (Canada)
- Coordinates: 49.642°N 102.674°W
- Country: Canada
- Province: Saskatchewan
- Region: Southeast
- Census division: 1
- Rural Municipality: Brock No. 64

Government
  - Type: Municipal
  - Governing body: Kisbey Village Council
  - Mayor: Kalvin Nankivell
  - Administrator: Judy Graham
  - MP: Robert Kitchen
  - MLA: Dan D'Autremont

Area
  - Total: 2.77 km^{2} (1.07 sq mi)

Population (2021)
  - Total: 158
  - Density: 57/km^{2} (150/sq mi)
- Time zone: UTC-6 (CST)
- Postal code: S0C 1L0
- Area code: 306
- Highways: Highway 13 Highway 605
- Railways: (Pulled)

Kisbey (2016 population: 153) is a village in the Canadian province of Saskatchewan within the Rural Municipality of Brock No. 64 and Census Division No. 1. The village took its name from Richard Claude Kisbey (d. 1941), an Irish immigrant who settled in Estevan.

== History ==
Kisbey incorporated as a village on May 8, 1907.

== Demographics ==
Population history (1971–2021)
Year	Pop.	±%
1971	260	—
1976	252	−3.1%
1981	228	−9.5%
1986	234	+2.6%
1991	219	−6.4%
1996	209	−4.6%
2001	199	−4.8%
2006	185	−7.0%
2011	217	+17.3%
2016	153	−29.5%
2021	158	+3.3%
Source: Statistics Canada via Saskatchewan Bureau of Statistics

In the 2021 Census of Population conducted by Statistics Canada, Kisbey had a population of 158 living in 77 of its 95 total private dwellings, a change of 3.3% from its 2016 population of 153. With a land area of 2.69 km^{2} (1.04 sq mi), it had a population density of 58.7/km^{2} (152.1/sq mi) in 2021.

In the 2016 Census of Population, the Village of Kisbey recorded a population of 153 living in 83 of its 95 total private dwellings, a −41.8% change from its 2011 population of 217. With a land area of 2.77 km^{2} (1.07 sq mi), it had a population density of 55.2/km^{2} (143.1/sq mi) in 2016.

== Sports ==
The Arcola/Kisbey Combines of the senior men's Big 6 Hockey League play at the local ice rink.

== See also ==
- List of communities in Saskatchewan
- List of villages in Saskatchewan
