= First Nations in Saskatchewan =

Native Canadian band governments

First Nations in Saskatchewan constitute many Native Canadian band governments. First Nations ethnicities in the province include the Cree, Assiniboine, Saulteaux, Lakota, Dene and Dakota. Historically, the Atsina and Blackfoot could also be found at various times.

"In 1992, the federal and provincial governments signed a historic land claim agreement with Saskatchewan First Nations. Under the Agreement, the First Nations received money to buy land on the open market. As a result, about 761,000 acres have been turned into reserve land and many First Nations continue to invest their settlement dollars in urban areas."

== List of band governments ==
=== Treaty 4 ===
Nation	Main reserves	Population (2019)			
Nation	Main reserves	Total	On reserve	On other land	Off reserve
Carry the Kettle Nakoda First Nation	Assiniboine 76	2,921	892	0	2,029
Cote First Nation	Cote 64	4,061	1,074	0	2,987
Cowessess First Nation	Cowessess 73	4,295	846	0	3,449
Day Star First Nation	Day Star 87	530	170	0	360
Fishing Lake First Nation	Fishing Lake 89	1,842	508	0	1,334
George Gordon First Nation	Gordon 86	3,752	1,191	0	2,561
Kahkewistahaw First Nation	Kahkewistahaw 72	2,105	607	0	1,498
Kawacatoose First Nation	Poorman 88	3,250	1,157	1	2,092
Keeseekoose First Nation	Keeseekoose 66	2,525	711	0	1,814
Kinistin Saulteaux Nation	Kinistin 91	1,089	339	0	750
Little Black Bear First Nation	Little Black Bear 84	592	212	0	380
Muscowpetung Saulteaux Nation	Muscowpetung 80	1,475	330	0	1,145
Muskowekwan First Nation	Muskowekwan 85	1,963	579	0	1,384
Nekaneet Cree Nation	Nekaneet Reserve	542	215	1	325
Ocean Man First Nation	Ocean Man 69	561	146	0	415
Ochapowace Nation	Ochapowace 71	1,890	642	1	1,247
Okanese First Nation	Okanese 82				
Pasqua First Nation	Pasqua 79				
Peepeekisis Cree Nation	Peepeekisis 81				
Pheasant Rump Nakota First Nation	Pheasant Rump 68				
Piapot First Nation	Piapot 75				
Standing Buffalo Dakota Nation	Standing Buffalo 78				
Star Blanket Cree Nation	Star Blanket 83				
The Key First Nation	The Key 65				
White Bear First Nation	White Bear 70				
Wood Mountain Dakota Sioux Nation	Wood Mountain 160				
Yellow Quill First Nation	Yellow Quill 90				
Zagime Anishinabek	Sakimay 74				

=== Treaty 5 ===
Nation	Main reserves	Population (2019)			
Nation	Main reserves	Total	On reserve	On other land	Off reserve
Cumberland House Cree Nation	Cumberland House Cree Nation 20	1,749	912	0	837
Red Earth Cree Nation	Red Earth 29	1,892	1,586	0	306
Shoal Lake Cree Nation	Shoal Lake 28A	1,119	874	1	244

=== Treaty 6 ===
Nation	Main reserves	Population (2019)			
Nation	Main reserves	Total	On reserve	On other land	Off reserve
Ahtahkakoop Cree Nation	Ahtahkakoop 104	3,670	1,876	3	1,791
Beardy's and Okemasis' Cree Nation	Beardy's 97 and Okemasis 96	3,538	1,354	0	2,184
Big Island Lake Cree Nation	Big Island Lake Cree Territory	1,266	887	0	379
Big River First Nation	Big River 118	3,618	2,451	0	1,167
Flying Dust First Nation	Flying Dust 105				
Island Lake First Nation					
James Smith Cree Nation	James Smith 100				
Lac La Ronge Indian Band	Little Red River 106C; Lac la Ronge 156; Sucker River 156C; Stanley 157; Morin Lake 217; Grandmother's Bay 219	11,177	6,818	179	4,180
Little Pine First Nation	Little Pine 116				
Lucky Man Cree Nation	Lucky Man Reserve				
Makwa Sahgaiehcan First Nation	Makwa Lake 129				
Mistawasis Nêhiyawak	Mistawasis 103				
Montreal Lake Cree Nation	Montreal Lake 106				
Moosomin First Nation	Moosomin 112				
Mosquito, Grizzly Bear's Head, Lean Man First Nations	Mosquito 109; Grizzly Bear's Head 110 and Lean Man 111				
Muskeg Lake Cree Nation	Muskeg Lake 102				
Muskoday First Nation	Muskoday				
One Arrow First Nation	One Arrow 95				
Onion Lake Cree Nation	Seekaskootch 119; Makaoo 120				
Pelican Lake First Nation	Chitek Lake 191				
Peter Ballantyne Cree Nation	Pelican Narrows 184B				
Poundmaker Cree Nation	Poundmaker 114				
Red Pheasant Cree Nation	Red Pheasant 108				
Saulteaux First Nation	Saulteaux 159				
Sweetgrass First Nation	Sweet Grass 113				
Sturgeon Lake First Nation	Sturgeon Lake 101				
Thunderchild First Nation	Thunderchild 115B				
Wahpeton Dakota Nation	Wahpeton 94				
Waterhen Lake First Nation	Waterhen 130				
Witchekan Lake First Nation	Witchekan Lake 117				

=== Treaty 8 ===
Nation	Main reserves	Population (2019)			
Nation	Main reserves	Total	On reserve	On other land	Off reserve
Black Lake Denesuline First Nation	Chicken 224	2,255	1,638	0	617
Clearwater River Dene Nation	Clearwater River	2,309	986	0	1,323
Fond du Lac Dene Nation	Fond du Lac 227	2,128	1,133	0	995

=== Treaty 10 ===
Nation	Main reserves	Population (2019)			
Nation	Main reserves	Total	On reserve	On other land	Off reserve
Birch Narrows Dene Nation	Turnor Lake 194	833	439	0	394
Buffalo River Dene Nation	Buffalo River Dene Nation 193	1,499	798	0	701
Canoe Lake First Nation	Canoe Lake 165				
English River First Nation	La Plonge 192; Wapachewunak 192D	1,625	778	0	847
Hatchet Lake Dene Nation	Lac la Hache 220				

== Demographics ==
=== Knowledge of language ===
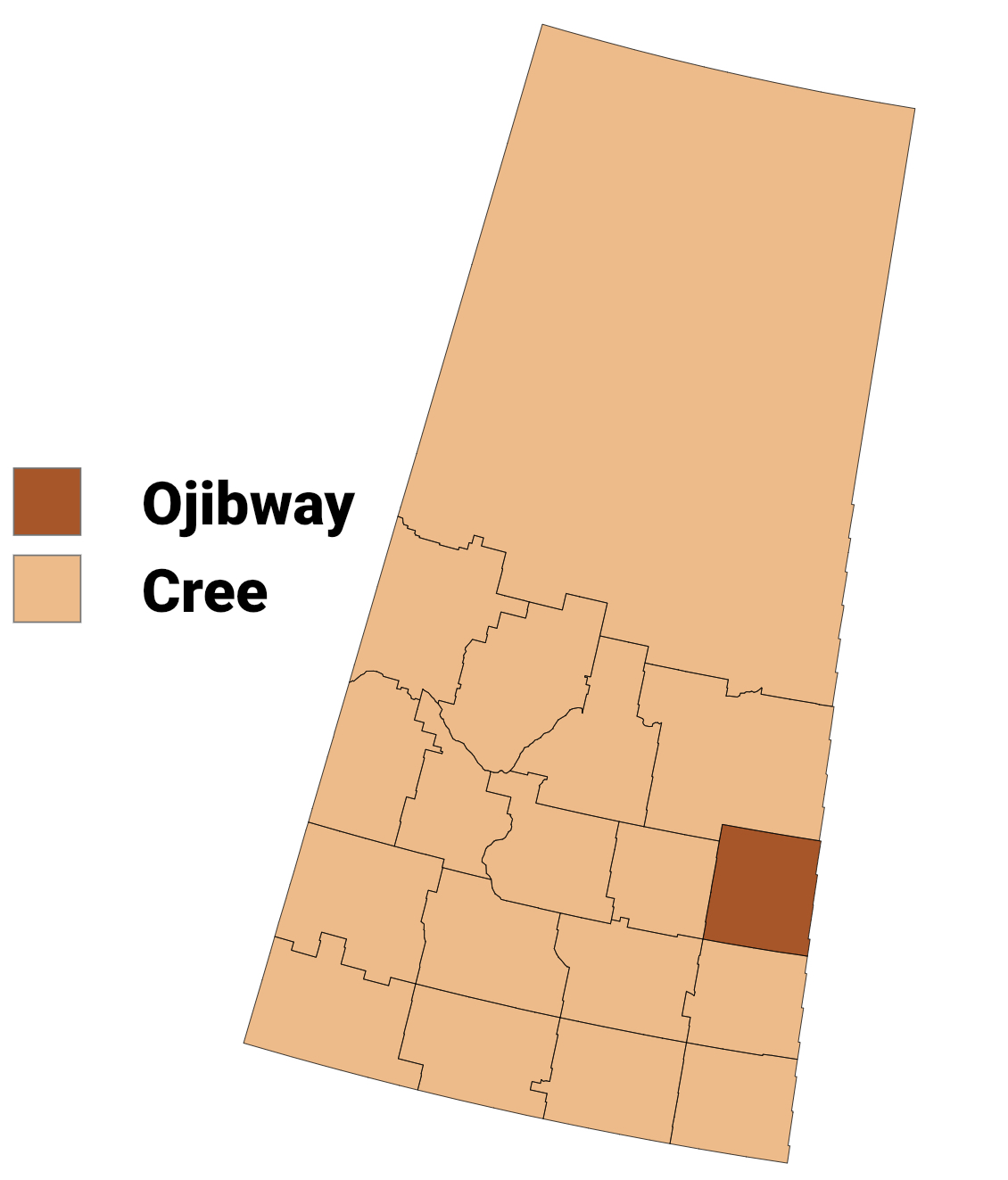
Largest First Nations knowledge of language in Saskatchewan, 2021 census

== See also ==
- Politics of Saskatchewan
