= Nemeiben Lake (Saskatchewan) =

Lake in Saskatchewan, Canada

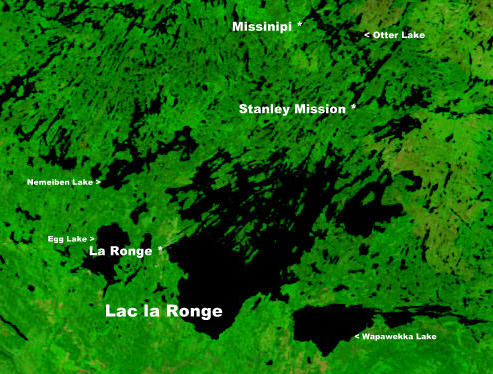
- NASA image of Lac la Ronge with Nemeiben Lake to the west (left)

- Location in Saskatchewan Nemeiben Lake (Canada)
- Location: Northern Saskatchewan Administration District
- Coordinates: 55.3052°N 105.5076°W
- Type: Glacial lake
- Etymology: Cree word meaning "Sucker"
- Part of: Churchill River drainage basin
- Primary inflows: Miller Channel
- River sources: Canadian Shield
- Primary outflows: Nemeiben Creek
- Basin countries: Canada
- Surface area: 15,112 ha (37,340 acres)
- Max. depth: 129 m (423 ft)
- Shore length^{1}: 466 km (290 mi)
- Surface elevation: 372 m (1,220 ft)
- Islands: Thornson Island; McBeth Island; Whitmire Island; Lindskog Island
- Settlements: Nemeiben Lake
- ^{1} Shore length is not a well-defined measure.

Nemeiben Lake is a large glacial lake in the Canadian Shield of Northern Saskatchewan, Canada. Nemeiben is Cree for "sucker". The lake, which is part of the Churchill River drainage basin, is surrounded by coniferous forest and has a subarctic climate. Nemeiben Lake — the only community at the lake — is at the southern tip of Bell Bay. A portion of Lac La Ronge Provincial Park runs along the lake's eastern shore. Nemeiben Lake Campground is near the community on the eastern shore of Bell Bay. Access to the lake and its amenities is from Highway 102.

In 2015 and 2025, large wild fires swept the area destroying homes and burning the forest.

== Description ==
Nemeiben Lake is the 42nd largest lake in Saskatchewan. It is an irregularly shaped lake with many islands, bays, and peninsulas. The lake sits at an elevation of 372 metres (1,220 ft), covers an area of 15,112 hectares (37,340 acres), has a shoreline measuring 466 kilometres (290 mi), and is 129 metres (423 ft) deep. Miller Channel, which flows in from Head Lake, is its primary inflow. Nemeiben Creek flows out of Nemeiben Lake at the eastern end and into Lac la Ronge. Lac la Ronge is connected to the Churchill River via Rapid River.

Bell Bay, at the lake's southern end, was named after Frank Harvergail Currie Bell. He died in a training accident in Farnham, Quebec in 1941.

== Forest fires ==
In 2015, a large forest fire swept through the area. It burnt large swathes of forest around the lake and destroyed many homes in the hamlet of Nemeiben Lake. In 2025, the Pisew Fire approached the lake. It forced the evacuation of the residents and campers in the area. The community itself escaped the blaze but the fire scorched the surrounding forest and several cabins around the lake were burnt.

== Fish species ==
Fish commonly found in Nemeiben Lake include walleye, lake trout, northern pike, cisco, longnose sucker, white sucker, burbot, lake whitefish, and yellow perch.

== See also ==
- List of lakes of Saskatchewan
- Tourism in Saskatchewan
- 2015 Canadian wildfires
- 2025 Canadian wildfires
