= Ronge =

Ronge may refer to:

- Rongé Island, Antarctica
- Johannes Ronge (1813–1887), German priest, principal founder of the New Catholics
- Bertha Ronge (1818–1863), education and religious activist, wife of Johannes
- Maximilian Ronge (1874–1953), military intelligence chief in the Austro-Hungarian Empire
- Barry Ronge, South African journalist, writer and broadcaster
- Walter Ronge, U.S. soccer player

== See also ==
- La Ronge, Saskatchewan, Canada
- Lac la Ronge, Saskatchewan
- Lac La Ronge First Nation
- La Ronge Ice Wolves, a junior ice hockey team
- La Ronge Water Aerodrome
- La Ronge (Barber Field) Airport
- Air Ronge, Saskatchewan
