= Missinipe =

Community in Saskatchewan, Canada

Missinipe Misi-nipiy (Cree)
- Northern settlement
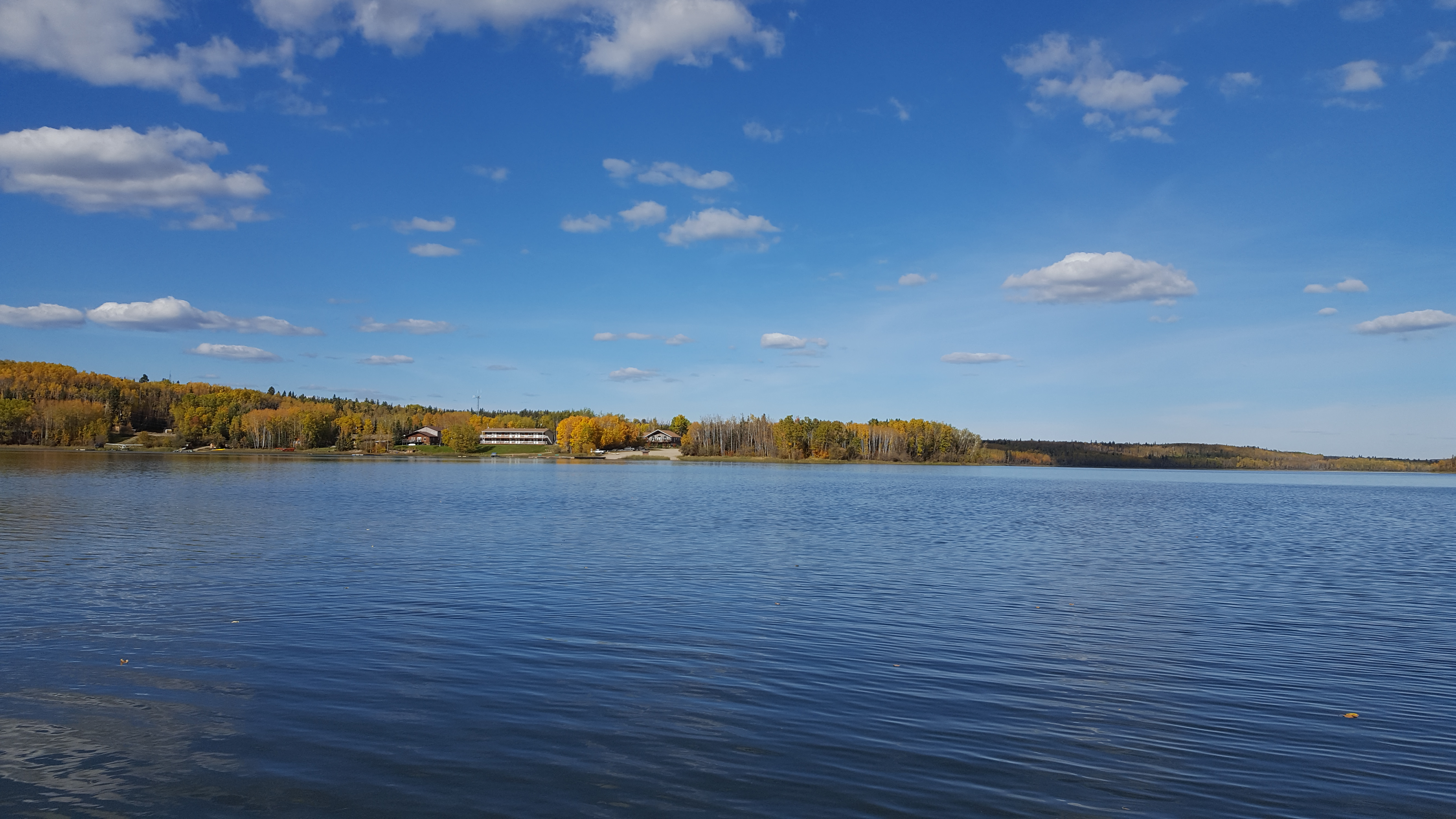
- South view of Missinipe

- Location within Saskatchewan Location within Canada
- Coordinates: 55°36′19″N 104°46′49″W
- Country: Canada
- Province: Saskatchewan
- Treaty: Treaty 10
- District: Northern Saskatchewan Administration District
- Census division: Division No. 18
- Dissolved (northern settlement): October 1, 2009

Government
  - Chairman: Leo Jacobsen
  - MP: Gary Vidal (CPC)
  - MLA: Doyle Vermette (NDP)

Area (2021)(
  - Land: 1.5 km^{2} (0.58 sq mi)

Population (2021)
  - Total: 27
- Time zone: UTC−06:00 (CST)

Missinipe (Woodland Cree: Misi-nipiy or Mahttawi-sipiy), meaning "big water" or "difficult river", is a northern settlement in northern Saskatchewan along the western shore of Otter Lake. The northern settlement is 80 kilometres (50 mi) north of La Ronge along Highway 2 within the Northern Saskatchewan Administration District and the provincial Census Division No. 18.

== History ==
Missinipe was previously incorporated as a northern hamlet. It disorganized from northern hamlet status to become a northern settlement under the jurisdiction of the Northern Saskatchewan Administration District on October 1, 2009.

=== Etymology ===
There are two similar explanations for the name of the settlement. According to Bill Barry's Geographic Names of Saskatchewan, the name Missinipe comes from the word Misi-nipiy, which is the Woodland Cree name for the nearby Churchill River and means "big water". Tourism Saskatchewan confirms that the community's etymological origins come from the Churchill River but states that the word is instead Mahttawi-sipiy, meaning "difficult river".

== Geography ==
Missinipe is 80 km (50 mi) north of La Ronge and 320 km (200 mi) north of the nearest city, Prince Albert. Along Highway 102, the northern settlement is between Sucker River Indian Reserve 156C and Brabant Lake. The community of Grandmother's Bay, an extension of the Lac La Ronge First Nation, lies approximately 5 miles to the northeast, directly across Otter Lake.

== Demographics ==
In the 2021 Census of Population conducted by Statistics Canada, Missinipe had a population of 27 living in 10 of its 29 total private dwellings, a change of 440% from its 2016 population of 5. With a land area of 1.5 km^{2} (0.58 sq mi), it had a population density of 18.0/km^{2} (46.6/sq mi) in 2021.

== Attractions ==
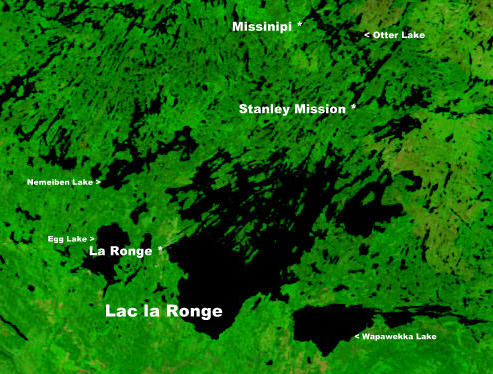
Location of Missinipe north of Lac la Ronge

As a result of its status as a main access point to the Churchill River, Missinipe is home to a float plane service, a canoe outfitter, and fishing outfitters. While generally empty during winter, the community is home to a seasonally operated general store, tourist cabins and other accommodations in the summer months. Tourism brings in seasonal campers, birdwatchers, and fishers, among others.

There are provincial campgrounds 5 km north at Otter Rapids, 7 km north at the Devil Lake Provincial Recreation Site, and 1.5 km south of Missinipe. There is also a provincial campground within the community itself, as Missinipe is nearby Lac La Ronge Provincial Park.

== Transportation ==
The community may be accessed by Highway 102 or by float plane.

== See also ==
- List of communities in Northern Saskatchewan
- List of communities in Saskatchewan
