= Tom Roberts (journalist) =

Tom Roberts (born ca. 1950) is a retired Canadian radio host and journalist.

Roberts was born in Stanley Mission, Saskatchewan to a northern Cree family who made their living as trappers, fishers, and tour guides. The family's trapline was at Forbes Lake, a remote lake about 50 kilometres north of Otter Lake. Dissatisfied with trapping, Roberts left to pursue studies in La Ronge and Yorkton, eventually finding work as an airfreight radio operator and a Cree–English translator. This experience led to him being offered a job as a broadcast radio announcer by the Department of Northern Saskatchewan. Roberts's Cree-language broadcasts became the first indigenous-language programming in Saskatchewan.

In 1982, premier Grant Devine's government dissolved the Department and cancelled its communications program, and the following year Roberts joined CBC Radio. Roberts became the host of Keewatin Country, a one-hour news magazine broadcast weekdays at noon. He remained in this position until his retirement in 2010.

In 2003, Roberts was awarded the Women of the Dawn's First Nations Award for journalism.
