= Otter Lake (Saskatchewan) =

Lake in Saskatchewan, Canada

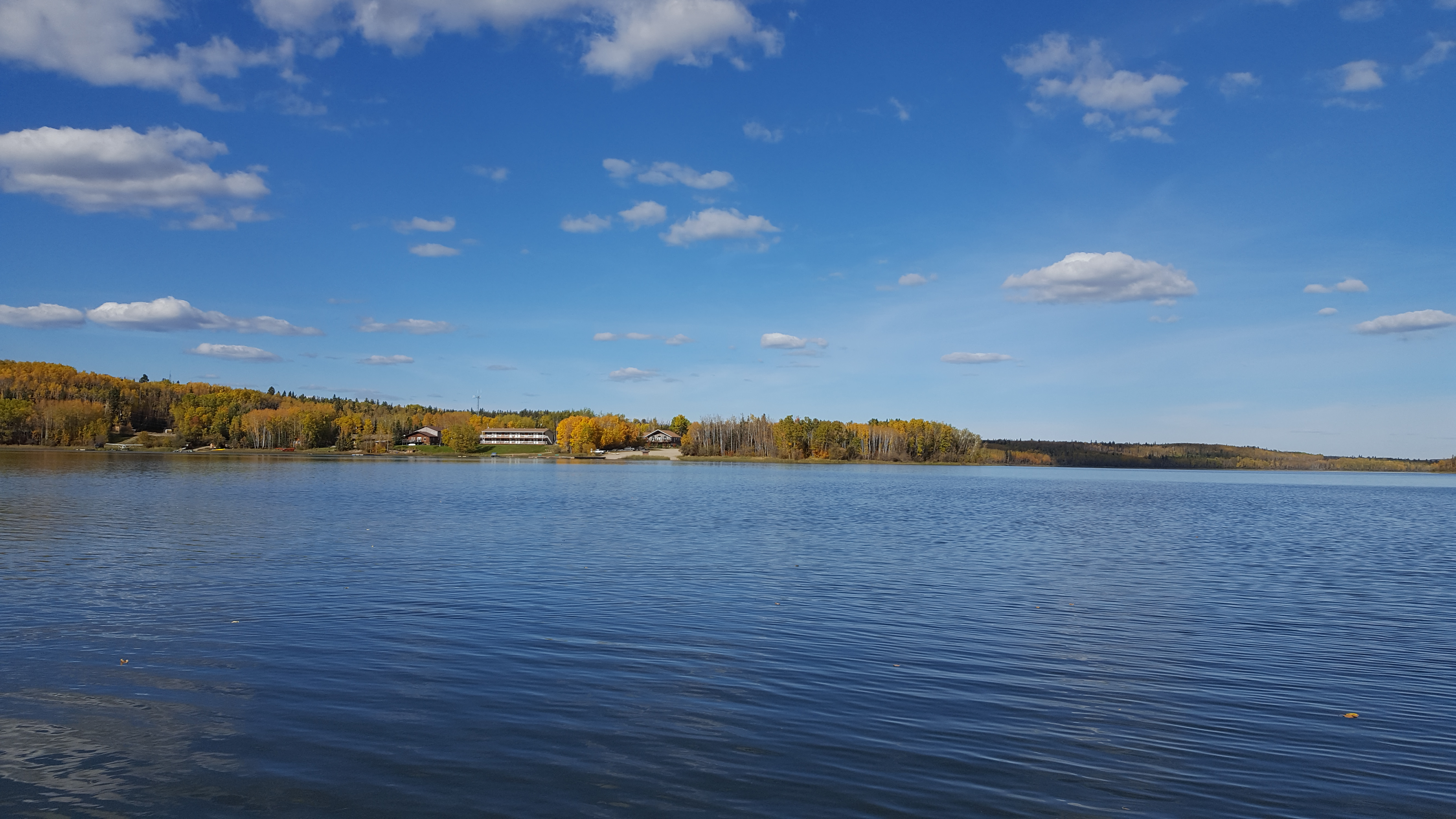
- Otter Lake with Missinipe

- Location in Saskatchewan Otter Lake (Canada)

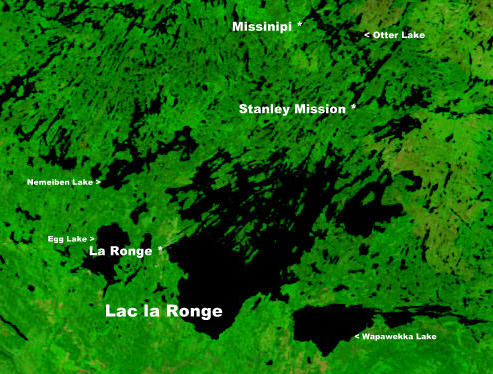
- NASA image showing Otter Lake north of Lac la Ronge
- Location: Northern Administration District, Saskatchewan
- Coordinates: 55°35′N 104°40′W
- Part of: Churchill River drainage basin
- Primary inflows: Churchill River
- Primary outflows: Churchill River
- Basin countries: Canada
- Max. length: 16 km (10 mi)
- Max. width: 14.5 km (9 mi)
- Islands: Biden Island; Taylor Island; Paul Island; Bennett Island; Ball Island; Sibbald Island; Isbister Island; Utie Island; Gus Island; Naheyow Island; Neesokat Island
- Settlements: Missinipe; Grandmother's Bay

Otter Lake is a lake in the province of Saskatchewan, Canada. It is about 80 kilometres (50 mi) north of La Ronge and is accessible from Highway 102. The lake is part of the Churchill River system. The Churchill River runs through the lake. Upstream along the Churchill is Devil Lake and downstream is Mountain Lake. The lake is approximately 16 km (10 mi) long and 14.5 km (9 mi) at its widest point.

== Access ==
The hamlet of Missinipe is located on the western shore of Otter Lake while Grandmother's Bay Indian reserve is located on the north shore of the lake. The lake is on the north side of Lac La Ronge Provincial Park and one of the park's four RV parks is located on the east shore. Two of the streets in Missinipe are part of the RV park. Missinipe is the Woodland Cree name for the Churchill River.

== Fish species ==
Fish found in the lake include walleye, sauger, yellow perch, northern pike, lake trout, lake whitefish, cisco, burbot, white sucker, and longnose sucker.

== See also ==
- List of lakes of Saskatchewan
