= Stanley Mission =

Community in Saskatchewan, Canada

Stanley Mission ᐋᒪᒋᐑᐢᐱᒧᐏᓂᕽ âmaciwîspimowinihk
- Community
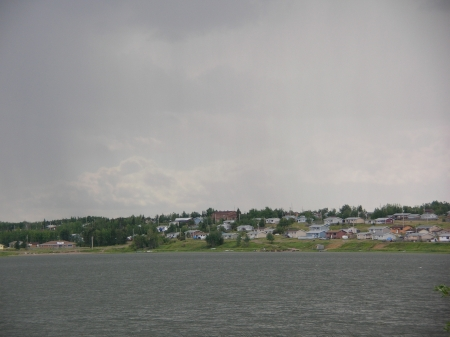
- Stanley Mission across the Churchill River

- Location of Stanley Mission Stanley Mission (Canada)
- Coordinates: 55°24′45″N 104°34′08″W
- Country: Canada
- Province: Saskatchewan
- District: Northern Administration District
- Founded: 1851

Government
  - Type: Canadian First Nation (Indian band)
  - Chief: Tammy Cook-Searson
- Elevation: 377 m (1,237 ft)
- Time zone: UTC−06:00 (CST)
- Postal code: S0J 2P0
- Area code: 306
- Website: Stanley Mission

Stanley Mission (Woods Cree: ᐋᒪᒋᐑᐢᐱᒧᐏᓂᕽ, romanized: âmaciwîspimowinihk, lit. 'at the place for shooting arrows up a cliff') is a First Nations settlement in the boreal forest northern Saskatchewan, Canada. Its location is on the banks of the Churchill River, 80 kilometres (50 mi) northeast of the town of La Ronge, 305 kilometres (190 mi) north of Prince Albert. Access is provided by Highway 915.

The community consists of the northern settlement of Stanley Mission with a population of 124 and Stanley 157, an Indian reserve of the Lac La Ronge Indian Band band government with a population of 1,634.

== History ==
People have lived in the area for thousands of years. Across the river at the original site of Stanley Mission is Holy Trinity Anglican Church, built between 1854 and 1860. It is the oldest standing building in Saskatchewan.

The community was founded in 1851. The name was derived from Stanley Park, a now-former manor house in Selsley, Gloucestershire, England, which had been the home of the wife of the Rev. Robert Hunt, an Anglican missionary.

== Demographics ==
In the 2021 Census of Population conducted by Statistics Canada, Stanley Mission had a population of 104 living in 34 of its 42 total private dwellings, a change of 9.5% from its 2016 population of 95. With a land area of 0.28 km^{2} (0.11 sq mi), it had a population density of 371.4/km^{2} (962.0/sq mi) in 2021.

== Attractions ==
The community has three stores, a band office, a health office, elementary and high schools, a post-secondary learning centre, a community hall, arena (ice skating and hockey), and other services. It is an access point to the northern parts of Lac La Ronge Provincial Park, several tourist fishing camps, and a major recreational canoe route, formerly part of the voyageurs trade routes used by the Hudson's Bay Company and North West Company. It is the closest road access to Nistowiak Falls, one of the tallest in Saskatchewan. There are ancient pictograph sites in the vicinity. Otter Rapids 5 kilometres (3.1 mi) north of the settlement of Missinipe (Missinipi) are the next landmarks and community along Highway 102, to the north on the Churchill River (Missinipeis also the Woodland Cree name for the Churchill River).

== Notable people ==
- Tom Roberts, journalist

== See also ==
- List of population centres in Saskatchewan
