= Nemeiben Lake =

Communuty in Saskatchewan, Canada

Coordinates: 55.196°N 105.196°W

Location of Nemeiben Lake in Saskatchewan

Nemeiben Lake is a hamlet in north-central Saskatchewan, Canada. It is 17 kilometres (11 mi) north-west of the town of La Ronge on Nemeiben Lake in the Northern Saskatchewan Administration District. It is adjacent to the boundary of Lac La Ronge Provincial Park and near Nemeiben Lake Campground at the southern end of Bell Bay. The community is surrounded by coniferous forest and has a subarctic climate. Access is from a 7-kilometre (4.3 mi) long gravel road that connects to Highway 102.

Nemeiben Lake is a popular camping destination, with Nemeiben Lake Campground being a short distance to the north of the community on the eastern shore of Bell Bay. The campground has 52 campsites, lake access for boating and fishing, and a 1.5-kilometre (0.93 mi) long interpretive walking trail.

In June 2015, a forest fire burnt many homes in Nemeiben Lake, as well as much of the surrounding forest. In June 2025, the Pisew Fire approached the hamlet and an evacuation order was issued. While the fire did not reach the community, several other cabins around the lake were destroyed.

== See also ==
- List of communities in Saskatchewan
- 2015 Canadian wildfires
- 2025 Canadian wildfires
