= Four Portages 157C =

Indian reserve in Saskatchewan, Canada

Coordinates: 55°16′33″N 104°47′39″W

- Indian reserve
- Four Portages Indian Reserve No. 157C
- Location in Saskatchewan
- First Nation: Lac La Ronge Indian Band
- Country: Canada
- Province: Saskatchewan

Area
  - Total: 0.2 ha (0.49 acres)

Four Portages 157C is an Indian reserve of the Lac La Ronge Indian Band in Saskatchewan. It is about 23 miles (37 km) north-east of La Ronge, and on the north shore of Lac la Ronge.

== See also ==
- List of Indian reserves in Saskatchewan
