= Fox Point 157E =

Indian reserve in Saskatchewan, Canada

Coordinates: 54°58′48″N 104°52′09″W

- Indian reserve
- Fox Point Indian Reserve No. 157E
- Location in Saskatchewan
- First Nation: Lac La Ronge Indian Band
- Country: Canada
- Province: Saskatchewan

Area
  - Total: 4.2 ha (10 acres)

Fox Point 157E is an Indian reserve of the Lac La Ronge Indian Band in Saskatchewan. It is about 18 miles south-east of La Ronge, and on an island near the south shore of Lac la Ronge.

== See also ==
- List of Indian reserves in Saskatchewan
