= Fox Point 157D =

Indian reserve in Saskatchewan, Canada

Coordinates: 54°59′14″N 104°53′52″W

- Indian reserve
- Fox Point Indian Reserve No. 157D
- Location in Saskatchewan
- First Nation: Lac La Ronge Indian Band
- Country: Canada
- Province: Saskatchewan

Area
  - Total: 56.7 ha (140 acres)

Fox Point 157D is an Indian reserve of the Lac La Ronge Indian Band in Saskatchewan. It is about 16 miles south-east of La Ronge, and on the south-west shore of Lac la Ronge.

== See also ==
- List of Indian reserves in Saskatchewan
