= Little Red River =

Little Red River may refer to:

== In the United States ==
- Little Red River (Arkansas)
- Little Red River (Texas)

== In Canada ==
- Little Red River Cree Nation, in Alberta
- Little Red River 106C, an Indian reserve in Saskatchewan
- Little Red River 106D, an Indian reserve in Saskatchewan
- Little Red River (Saskatchewan), a river in central Saskatchewan
