= Lac La Ronge Provincial Park =

Provincial park in Saskatchewan, Canada

- IUCN category II (national park)
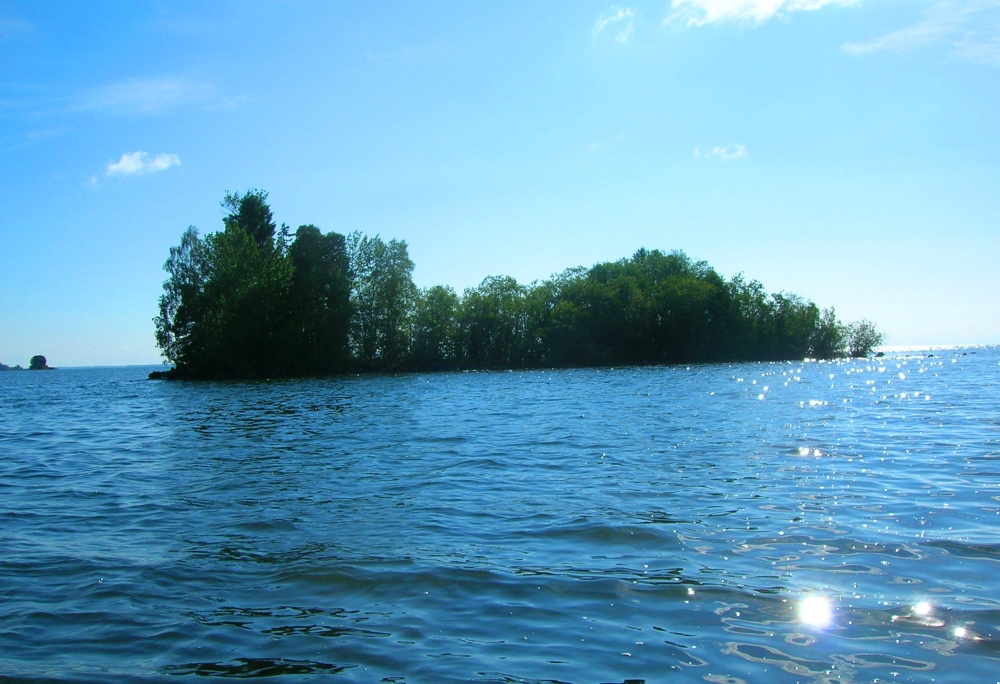
- Island on Lac la Ronge

- Location within Saskatchewan Location within Canada
- Location: Saskatchewan
- Nearest city: La Ronge, Saskatchewan
- Coordinates: 55°16′17″N 104°43′56″W
- Established: 1939
- Governing body: Sask Parks

Lac La Ronge Provincial Park is located in the boreal forest of the north central part of the Canadian province of Saskatchewan within the Canadian Shield. Situated in the Churchill River system, this provincial park has close to 100 lakes and more than 30 canoe routes, many of which follow old fur trade routes. Summer activities include camping, hiking, boating, fishing, and swimming. In the winter, there's cross-country skiing, snowmobiling, and ice fishing. One of Saskatchewan's highest waterfalls is in the park. The Nistowiak Falls are located north of Lac La Ronge along the Rapid River.

A little more than half of Lac La Ronge Provincial Park's area is water with Lac la Ronge being the largest lake. The park boundary begins on the western shore of Lac la Ronge at La Ronge and extends north to the Churchill River. Highway 102 forms this western boundary with one exception. About 13 kilometres (8.1 mi) north of the town of La Ronge, the park goes further west to include a section of Nemeiben Lake. The northern section of the park follows the Churchill River until it goes south to include the eastern shore of Lac la Ronge. Just north of Wapawekka Lake on the eastern shore the park ends.

== Campgrounds ==
There are seven campgrounds throughout the park that offer a variety of different camping experiences. All campgrounds have fire pits, washrooms, and access to potable water.

- Wadin Bay Campground (55.2853°N 105.1666°W) is at Wadin Bay on Lac la Ronge along Highway 102. There is a mix of electric and non-electric sites and there is a sani-dump.
- Churchill River Campground (55.64483°N 104.7355°W) is located at Otter Rapids on the Churchill River. Campsites are on both sides of Highway 102. All sites are non-electric.
- MacKay Lake Campground (55.4548°N 104.8725°W) is a small campground in MacKay Lake. There is beach access, a fish cleaning station, and a boat launch. All campsites are non-electric.
- Devil Lake Campground (55.65974°N 104.7293°W) is a small campground at Devil Lake Recreation Site in Lac La Ronge Provincial Park along Highway 102. Besides the campsites, there is a boat launch, fish cleaning station, and a trail that goes from the campground to Churchill River bridge at Otter Rapids. All campsites are non-electric.
- Nut Point Campground (55.12889°N 105.2616°W) has both electric and non-electric campsites, a sani-dump, playground, and a 15-km walking trail.
- Nemeiben Campground (55.2605°N 105.3718°W) is a campground on Nemeiben Lake. There is a 1.5-km interpretive walking trail, fishing, and other recreational activities. There are a mix of electric and non-electric campsites and a sani-dump station.
- Missinipe Campground (55.6002°N 104.7761°W) is a 15-site campground on the west shore of Otter Lake, near Missinipe. All campsites are electric and there is a sani-dump station.

== Access ==
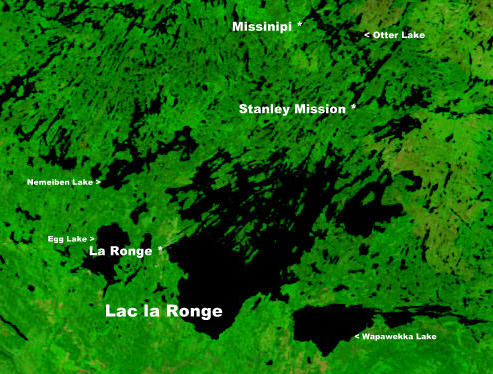
Location of La Ronge on Lac la Ronge

The town of La Ronge, 243 kilometres (151 mi) north of Prince Albert on the west side of Lac la Ronge, is reached by Highway 2. Highway 2 becomes Highway 102 within the community.

The following places in the park are reached from La Ronge on Highway 102 (distances are all from La Ronge).

- 18 kilometres (11 mi) north is the Nemeiben Lake access road.
- 27 kilometres (17 mi) north is Wadin Bay.
- 32 kilometres (20 mi) north is a settlement of the Lac La Ronge First Nation.
- 44 kilometres (27 mi) north is the junction of Highway 915 that leads to Stanley Mission. Across the Churchill River at Stanley Mission is Holy Trinity Anglican Church. It was designated a National Historic Site in 1970.
- 79 kilometres (49 mi) north is Missinipe.

Highway 912 ends in a dead end in the eastern side of the park.

== Flora and fauna ==
Wildlife found in and around the park include wolves, cougars, black bears, moose, deer, elk, antelope, caribou, coyotes, foxes, lynx, gophers, and rabbits. Trees commonly found in the park's rugged landscape are jack pine, spruce, and larch.

Fish species found in the park's largest lake, Lac la Ronge, include walleye, sauger, yellow perch, northern pike, lake trout, lake whitefish, cisco, white sucker, longnose sucker, and burbot.

== See also ==
- List of protected areas of Saskatchewan
- Tourism in Saskatchewan
