= Saskatchewan Highway 915 =

Provincial highway in Saskatchewan, Canada

Highway 915

Route information
- Maintained by Ministry of Highways and Infrastructure
- Length: 36 km (22 mi)

Major junctions
- West end: CanAm Highway / Highway 102 north of La Ronge
- East end: Hunt Street / Hardlotte Street in Stanley Mission

Location
- Country: Canada
- Province: Saskatchewan

Highway system
- Provincial highways in Saskatchewan
← Highway 914	→ Highway 916

Highway 915 is a provincial highway in the north-east region of the Canadian province of Saskatchewan. It runs from the CanAm Highway (Highway 102) to Stanley Mission within the Lac La Ronge First Nation. It is about 36 kilometres (22 mi) long.

For almost its entire length, Highway 915 lies within the Lac La Ronge Provincial Park. An intersection with Anglo Rouyn Road is about 3 kilometres (1.9 mi) from Highway 102.

== See also ==
- Roads in Saskatchewan
- Transportation in Saskatchewan
