= 2015 Canadian wildfires =

Wildfire outbreak

2015 Canadian wildfires were a series of wildfires across Canada and Alaska in June 2015 which spread smoke across most of North America. Over two hundred fires were ablaze across British Columbia, Saskatchewan, and Alberta.

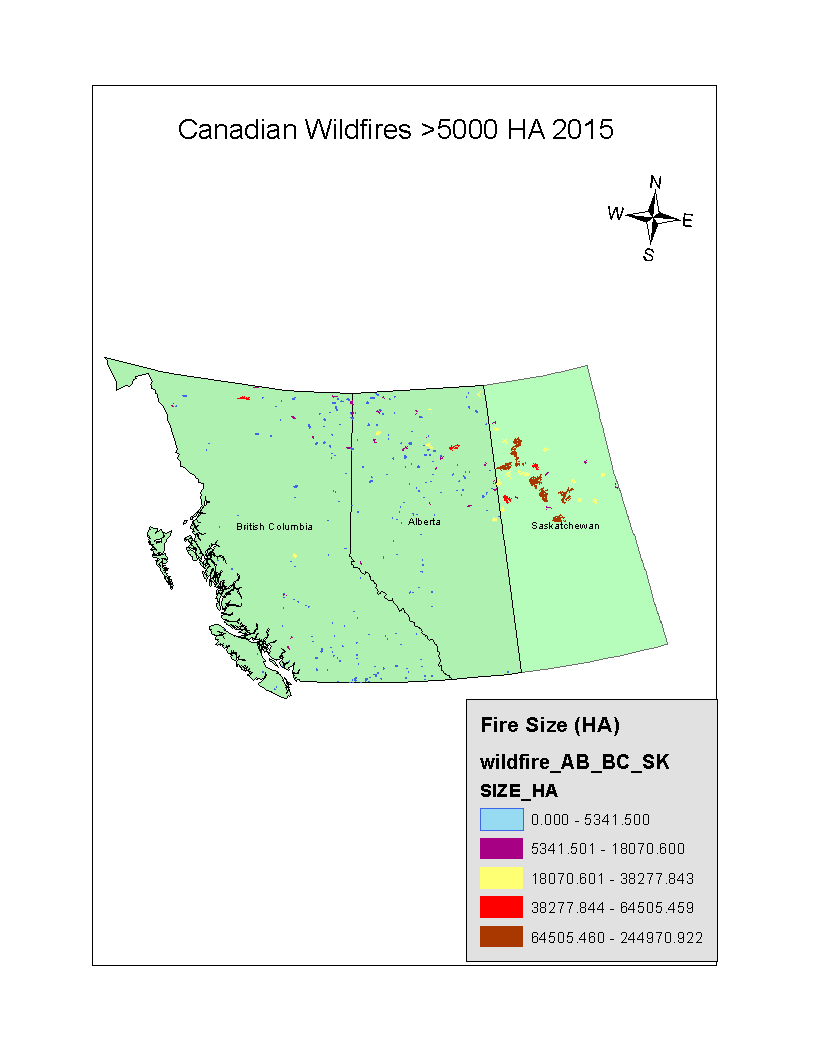

Tens of thousand of people had been evacuated and more than 1,900,000 hectares (4,700,000 acres) of forest had burned. Fire-fighters from Mexico, Western Australia, and New Zealand were sent to assist. The Canadian military also fought the fires. Since the smoke was so dense, warnings had been given across central and Western Canada; additionally, parts of the western United States were also issued air advisories because of the amount of smoke. Wildfires have burned one million hectares (2.4 million acres) in Saskatchewan in the past year according to statistics posted on the Canadian Interagency Forest Fire Centre. The words people have used to describe this natural disaster is "extreme, unprecedented, and historic." A majority of the ecosystem where the fire had been burning consists of boreal forests. Circumstances for catastrophic fires were created as a result of the fuel buildup starting in the 1950s caused fire inhibition. This outcome created a change in the landscape-age mosaic. Initially, this fuel buildup was created for closed canopy ecosystems such as the Pinus ponderosa located in the western United States.

== Causes ==
The major factors of the severe wildfire situation were weather conditions, dead grass, winds and lightning. Dead, dry grass were particularly flammable due to high temperatures and lack of rain. Meanwhile, fires spread very quick with forest fuels in windy situations. Moreover, lightning further deteriorated the situation.

== Wildfire progression ==
The wildfire season in Alberta in 2015 was unprecedented and began earlier than before. It started on 1 March and ended on October 31. By May 21, the wildfire hazard in the High Level Wildfire Management Area (HLWMA) was EXTREME. A fire restriction started in effect. As for July 10, the wildfire hazard dropped because of rain. By October 31, HLWMA had 333 wildfires and totalled 1,773 wildfires recorded, which was such a large figure that only had been exceeded twice since 1990, with 491,802 hectares burned.

Wildfire Hazard
Date	April 24	May 21	July 10	August 11
Level	MODERATE	EXTREME	HIGH	MODERATE

== Response effort ==
=== First responders ===
The 2015 fire season pushed the system to its limit in terms of engaging resources in a situation where other jurisdictions were also demanding resources. Fire suppression cost $198,561,059 in total, mobilising just short of 2000 personnel in the 2015 fire season. As a result, they contained 92.7% of wildfire in the first burning period, and 95.6% in the second burning period. The 2015 Fire season and wildfire management program review concluded that fire suppression was 'well-defined and well-executed'.

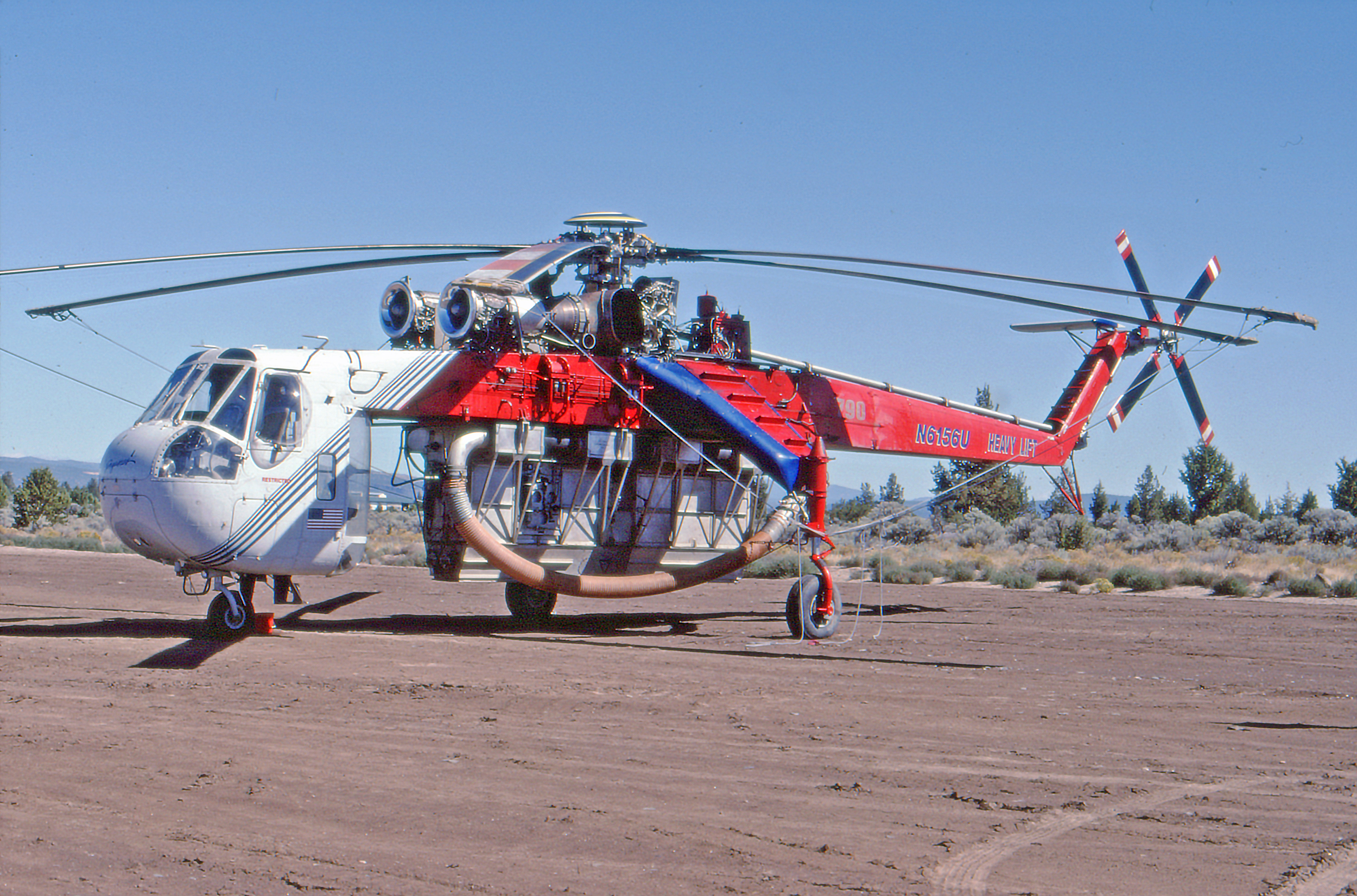
Sikorsky S-64 skycrane

However, more than 13,000 people were forced from their homes due to northern Saskatchewan blazes, according to Red Cross. The Canadian Red Cross, as of the 9th July 2015, had assisted more than 7,800 people in the province's northern region, with a total of 280 trained Red Cross personnel from across Canada on the ground with many others coordinating from a distance. The Saskatchewan government was forced to bring in a Sikorsky S-64 skycrane from Montana, and the deployment of an immediate response team of 500 members from the Canadian Armed Forces.

=== Political response ===
The political response to the wildfires was mixed. Canadian Prime Minister Stephen Harper visited a local crew near West Kelowna, B.C. Speaking to the media on the visit, Harper said "We know these are tough and are sometimes dangerous jobs and these efforts really are appreciated by everybody." Looking forward to the future, Harper told reporters that he had spoken with Premier Christy Clark and Saskatchewan Premier Brad Wall about improving methods of fire fighting.

== Impact ==
=== Provincial ===
All provinces in Canada were impacted by forest fires in the 2015 season but the provinces of British Columbia, Alberta, and Saskatchewan experienced unprecedented numbers of wildfires and hectares burned. The province of Alberta had 306 wildfires early in the season, which was 100 wildfires above historic averages and was the first indicator of an early and above normal forest fire season. Higher than normal winter and early spring temperatures in Alberta, as well as low precipitation averages across all the Western Canadian provinces was noted. The province of Saskatchewan experienced 292 wildfires above the 10-year average for the province.

Forest Fire Statistics 2015
Province	Total Wildfires (including causes)			Total Hectares burned
Province	Lightning	Human	Total	Total Hectares burned
British Columbia	1,235	601	1,836	280,445
Alberta	770	1,016	1,786	492,536
Saskatchewan	379	344	723	1,758,376

=== Socioeconomic ===
During the 2015 wildfires, almost 18,000 people were evacuated in approximately 80 evacuation events. The indigenous peoples make up a large portion of the total number of evacuees - they are disproportionately affected by the wildfires since they often live in remote forest areas. Forests are their main work and food source, and are also important from a cultural standpoint.

The province with the highest number of evacuees for 2015 season was Saskatchewan, including communities of La Ronge, Air Ronge and the Lac La Ronge Indian band where fires forced 13,000 people to leave their homes – making it the largest evacuation in the Saskatchewan history.

In British Columbia, 1,144 homes were evacuated (approximately 3,432 individuals), and over 50 structures were destroyed, the highest number since 2003, throughout the province, with major losses at Puntzi Lake and Rock Creek during 2015 wildfire season.

Wildfires also resulted in road closures which negatively impacted the oilsands, conventional oil, and gas industry in Alberta. Moreover, the damage to the forests and the forestry industry culminated into a total cost of almost $20 million CAD for remedial reforestation and reclamation work funded by the Alberta province.

=== Health ===
Air quality advisories were issued in British Columbia, Alberta, and Saskatchewan due extensive amounts of smoke and particulates in the air. The air quality advisories encouraged the elderly, infants, and individuals living with chronic illness to remain indoors; healthy individuals were encouraged to avoid outdoor strenuous activities to reduce exposure to wildfire smoke. Two wildfire suppression related fatalities occurred during the 2015 Canadian wildfires.

=== Environment ===
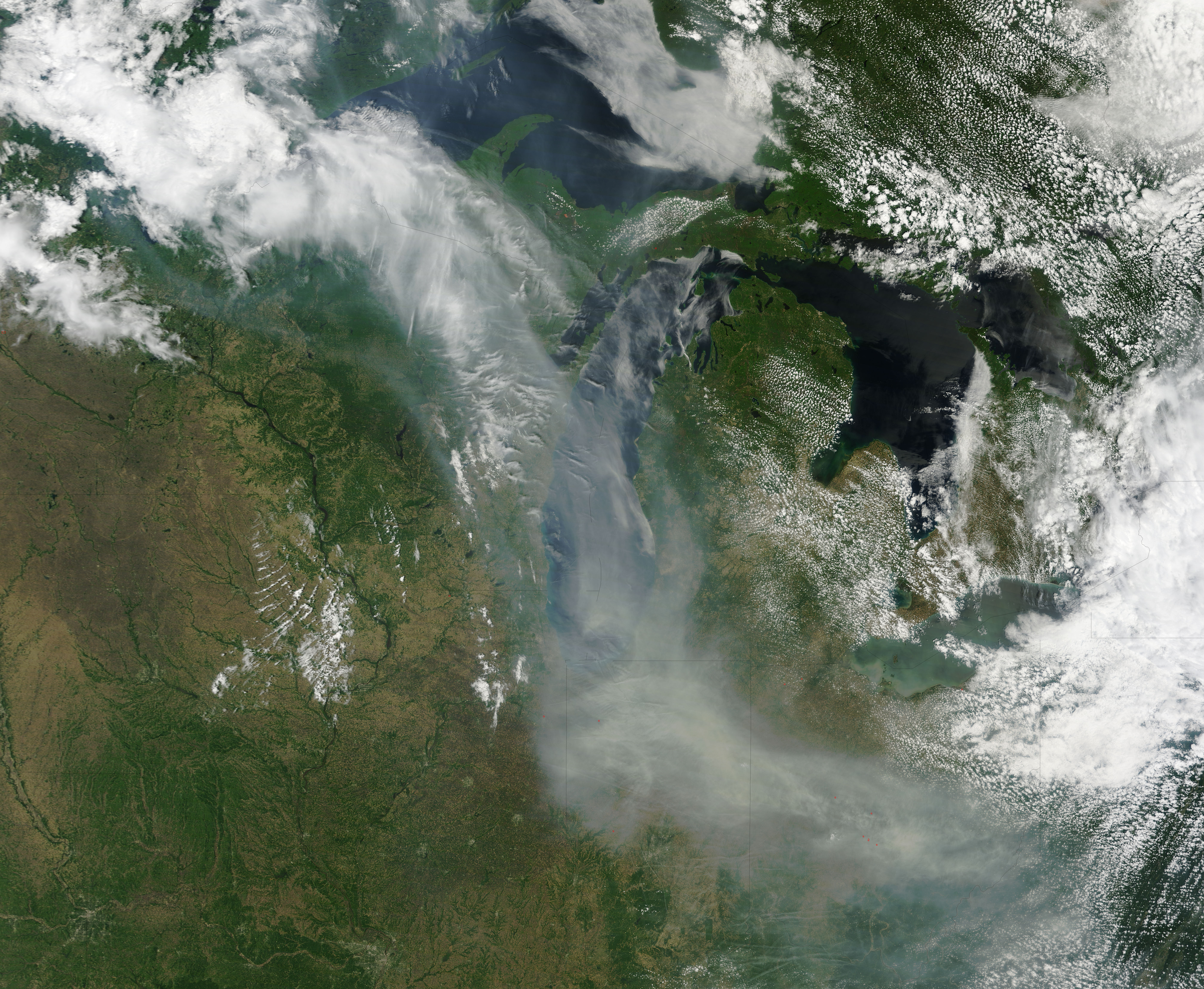
Smoke From Canadian Wildfires Drifts Down to U.S.

Burned soil and tree roots needed a long time to recover with complexly different species. Ashes and deeply burned organic soils which had high heat might smoulder under snow, leading to more fires. Moreover, wildfires produced air pollutants, polluting a quite large area of Canada and the United States.
