= Forbes Lake (Saskatchewan) =

Lake in Saskatchewan, Canada

- Location in Saskatchewan Forbes Lake (Canada)
- Location: Northern Administration District, Saskatchewan
- Coordinates: 55.8166°N 104.76937°W
- Type: Glacial lake
- Part of: Churchill River drainage basin
- River sources: Canadian Shield
- Primary outflows: Weaver River
- Basin countries: Canada
- Surface area: 1,505 ha (3,720 acres)
- Shore length^{1}: 104 km (65 mi)
- Surface elevation: 399 m (1,309 ft)
- Islands: McMillan Island
- Settlements: None
- ^{1} Shore length is not a well-defined measure.

Forbes Lake is a glacial Lake surrounded by boreal forest in the Canadian province of Saskatchewan. The lake is in the Churchill River drainage basin about 85 kilometres (53 mi) north-northeast of La Ronge. Administratively, it is in the Northern Saskatchewan Administration District.

Forbes Lake is an irregularly shaped lake with many bays, peninsulas, and small islands. The outflow, Weaver River, exits the lake at the southern end where it flows into Weaver Lake. Weaver Lake is connected to Bellows Lake, which in turn, is connected to Hayman Lake. Hayman Lake is a lake along the course of the Churchill River.

Two features at Forbes Lake have been named as part of the GeoMemorial Commemorative Naming Program. The program names features in honour of those who lost their lives in the service of Canada. Robertson Bay, at the southern end of the lake, is named after Forbes Robertson. McMillan Island, also at the southern end of the lake, is named after Glen Allan McMillan.

== Fish species ==
Fish commonly found in Forbes Lake include walleye, lake trout, northern pike, and lake whitefish.

== See also ==
- List of lakes of Saskatchewan
