= Little Hills 158B =

Indian reserve in Saskatchewan, Canada

Coordinates: 55°01′25″N 105°25′24″W

- Indian reserve
- Little Hills Indian Reserve No. 158B
- Location in Saskatchewan
- First Nation: Lac La Ronge Indian Band
- Country: Canada
- Province: Saskatchewan

Area
  - Total: 131.2 ha (324 acres)

Little Hills 158B is an Indian reserve of the Lac La Ronge Indian Band in Saskatchewan. It is about 8 miles south-west of La Ronge, and on the south-eastern shore of Bigstone Lake.

== See also ==
- List of Indian reserves in Saskatchewan
