= Lac la Ronge 156 =

Coordinates: 55°04′10″N 105°18′37″W

- Indian reserve
- Lac la Ronge Indian Reserve No. 156
- Location in Saskatchewan
- First Nation: Lac La Ronge
- Country: Canada
- Province: Saskatchewan
- Central office: Town of La Ronge

Government
  - Type: Band
  - Chief: Tammy Cook-Searson

Area
  - Total: 5.85 km^{2} (2.26 sq mi)

Population (2021)
  - Total: 1,349
  - Density: 231/km^{2} (597/sq mi)
- Time zone: UTC-6 (Central Time Zone)
- Postal code: S0J 1L0
- Area code(s): 306, 639, and 474
- Website: llrib.com

Lac la Ronge 156 is an Indian reserve of the Lac La Ronge Indian Band in Saskatchewan. It is 10 kilometres southwest of Lac la Ronge. In the 2021 Canadian Census, it recorded a population of 1,349 residents and 336 private dwellings.

Since 2025, the reserve is the home of the La Ronge Ice Wolves of the Saskatchewan Junior Hockey League (SJHL). The club plays its home games at the Jonas Roberts Memorial Community Centre (JRMCC).

== Sources ==
- "Land Use Mapping1_LAC LA RONGE I.R. 156" (PDF). llrib.com. Lac La Ronge Indian Band.
- "About". jrmccsportsrec.com. JRMCC Sport, Culture and Recreation Department.
