= Little Hills 158A =

Indian reserve in Saskatchewan, Canada

Coordinates: 55°02′40″N 105°27′22″W

- Indian reserve
- Little Hills Indian Reserve No. 158A
- Location in Saskatchewan
- First Nation: Lac La Ronge Indian Band
- Country: Canada
- Province: Saskatchewan

Area
  - Total: 38.3 ha (95 acres)

Little Hills 158A is an Indian reserve of the Lac La Ronge Indian Band in Saskatchewan. It is 6 miles south-west of La Ronge, and on the north bank of the Little Hills River.

== See also ==
- List of Indian reserves in Saskatchewan
