= Potato River 156A =

Indian reserve in Saskatchewan, Canada

Coordinates: 55°01′36″N 105°15′47″W

- Indian reserve
- Potato River Indian Reserve No. 156A
- Location in Saskatchewan
- First Nation: Lac La Ronge Indian Band
- Country: Canada
- Province: Saskatchewan

Area
  - Total: 409.5 ha (1,012 acres)

Potato River 156A is an Indian reserve of the Lac La Ronge Indian Band in Saskatchewan. It is about 6 miles south of La Ronge.

== See also ==
- List of Indian reserves in Saskatchewan
