= Bittern Lake 218 =

Indian reserve in Saskatchewan, Canada

Coordinates: 53°53′28″N 105°49′29″W

- Indian reserve
- Bittern Lake Indian Reserve No. 218
- Location in Saskatchewan
- First Nation: Lac La Ronge
- Country: Canada
- Province: Saskatchewan

Area
  - Total: 6,886 ha (17,020 acres)

Bittern Lake 218 is an Indian reserve of the Lac La Ronge Indian Band in Saskatchewan. It is 8 kilometres east of Prince Albert National Park.

== See also ==
- List of Indian reserves in Saskatchewan
