= Morin Lake 217 =

Indian reserve in Saskatchewan, Canada

Coordinates: 55°06′29″N 105°47′25″W

Morin Lake 217 ᒨᓱᓵᑲᐦᐃᑲᐣᓯᓯᕽ môsosâkahikansisihk
- Indian reserve
- Morin Lake Indian Reserve No. 217
- Location in Saskatchewan
- First Nation: Lac La Ronge
- Country: Canada
- Province: Saskatchewan

Area
  - Total: 14,146.1 ha (34,956 acres)

Population (2016)
  - Total: 577
  - Density: 4.08/km^{2} (10.6/sq mi)
- Community Well-Being Index: 45

Morin Lake 217 (Woods Cree: ᒨᓱᓵᑲᐦᐃᑲᐣᓯᓯᕽ, romanized: môsosâkahikansisihk) is an Indian reserve of the Lac La Ronge Indian Band in Saskatchewan, Canada. It is about 24 kilometres (15 mi) east of Lac la Ronge. The Montreal River runs through the reserve.

In the 2016 Canadian Census, the reserve recorded a population of 577 living in 135 of its 155 total private dwellings. In the same year, its Community Well-Being index was calculated at 45 of 100, compared to 58.4 for the average First Nations community and 77.5 for the average non-Indigenous community.

== See also ==
- List of Indian reserves in Saskatchewan
