= Little Hills 158 =

Indian reserve in Saskatchewan, Canada

Coordinates: 55°03′00″N 105°25′28″W

- Indian reserve
- Little Hills Indian Reserve No. 158
- Location in Saskatchewan
- First Nation: Lac La Ronge Indian Band
- Country: Canada
- Province: Saskatchewan

Area
  - Total: 517.2 ha (1,278 acres)

Population (2016)
  - Total: 0
  - Density: 0.0/km^{2} (0.0/sq mi)

Little Hills 158 is an Indian reserve of the Lac La Ronge Indian Band in Saskatchewan. In the 2016 Canadian Census, it recorded a population of 0 living in 0 of its 0 total private dwellings.

== See also ==
- List of Indian reserves in Saskatchewan
