= Old Fort 157B =

Indian reserve in Saskatchewan, Canada

Coordinates: 55°16′53″N 104°36′21″W

- Indian reserve
- Old Fort Indian Reserve No. 157B
- Location in Saskatchewan
- First Nation: Lac La Ronge Indian Band
- Country: Canada
- Province: Saskatchewan

Area
  - Total: 5.4 ha (13 acres)

Old Fort 157B is an Indian reserve of the Lac La Ronge Indian Band in Saskatchewan.

== See also ==
- List of Indian reserves in Saskatchewan
