= List of population centres in Saskatchewan =

A population centre, in Canadian census data, is a populated place, or a cluster of interrelated populated places, which meets the demographic characteristics of an urban area, having a population of at least 1,000 people and a population density of no fewer than 400 persons per square km^{2}.

The term was first introduced in the 2011 Canadian census; prior to that, Statistics Canada used the term urban area.

In the 2021 Census of Population, Statistics Canada listed 63 population centres in the province of Saskatchewan.

== List ==
The below table is a list of those population centres in Saskatchewan from the 2021 Census of Population as designated, named, and delineated by Statistics Canada.

Rank	Population centre	Size group	Population (2021)	Population (2016)	Change	Land area (km^{2})	Population density
1	Saskatoon	Large urban	264,637	245,904	+7.6%	134.63	1,965.7/km^{2}
2	Regina	Large urban	224,996	214,664	+4.8%	105.61	2,130.4/km^{2}
3	Prince Albert	Medium	36,768	35,102	+4.7%	21.37	1,720.5/km^{2}
4	Moose Jaw	Medium	32,813	32,993	−0.5%	22.14	1,482.1/km^{2}
5	Lloydminster	Medium	31,582	31,400	+0.6%	24.43	1,292.8/km^{2}
6	Swift Current	Small	16,304	16,264	+0.2%	14.69	1,109.9/km^{2}
7	Yorkton	Small	15,969	16,046	−0.5%	10.68	1,495.2/km^{2}
8	North Battleford	Small	13,649	14,135	−3.4%	8.67	1,574.3/km^{2}
9	Warman	Small	12,362	10,961	+12.8%	7.65	1,615.9/km^{2}
10	Weyburn	Small	10,883	10,755	+1.2%	8.51	1,278.8/km^{2}
11	Estevan	Small	10,629	11,316	−6.1%	9.43	1,127.1/km^{2}
12	Martensville	Small	10,499	9,645	+8.9%	5.48	1,915.9/km^{2}
13	Melfort	Small	5,718	5,778	−1.0%	4.33	1,320.6/km^{2}
14	La Ronge	Small	5,317	5,709	−6.9%	8.76	607.0/km^{2}
15	Humboldt	Small	5,313	5,194	+2.3%	3.48	1,526.7/km^{2}
16	Meadow Lake	Small	5,141	5,266	−2.4%	3.28	1,567.4/km^{2}
17	White City	Small	4,713	4,264	+10.5%	6.32	745.7/km^{2}
18	Nipawin	Small	4,147	4,016	+3.3%	3.37	1,230.6/km^{2}
19	Melville	Small	4,075	4,127	−1.3%	2.84	1,434.9/km^{2}
20	Battleford	Small	3,651	3,750	−2.6%	2.14	1,706.1/km^{2}
21	Kindersley	Small	2,938	3,052	−3.7%	1.79	1,641.3/km^{2}
22	Tisdale	Small	2,878	3,136	−8.2%	2.8	1,027.9/km^{2}
23	Moosomin	Small	2,478	2,548	−2.7%	1.93	1,283.9/km^{2}
24	Unity	Small	2,406	2,475	−2.8%	2.42	994.2/km^{2}
25	Rosetown	Small	2,384	2,331	+2.3%	1.89	1,261.4/km^{2}
26	Pilot Butte	Small	2,364	1,871	+26.3%	2.75	859.6/km^{2}
27	Assiniboia	Small	2,333	2,389	−2.3%	2.39	976.2/km^{2}
28	Esterhazy	Small	2,191	2,367	−7.4%	2.47	887.0/km^{2}
29	Maple Creek	Small	2,151	2,074	+3.7%	1.57	1,370.1/km^{2}
30	Pelican Narrows	Small	2,133	2,281	−6.5%	2.73	781.3/km^{2}
31	Outlook	Small	2,112	2,065	+2.3%	2.82	748.9/km^{2}
32	Biggar	Small	2,045	2,165	−5.5%	1.51	1,354.3/km^{2}
33	La Loche	Small	2,009	1,913	+5.0%	1.55	1,296.1/km^{2}
34	Stanley Mission 157	Small	1,987	1,935	+2.7%	2.69	738.7/km^{2}
35	Fort Qu'Appelle	Small	1,866	1,920	−2.8%	2.09	892.8/km^{2}
36	Indian Head	Small	1,819	1,824	−0.3%	1.73	1,051.4/km^{2}
37	Watrous	Small	1,817	1,865	−2.6%	1.96	927.0/km^{2}
38	Lumsden	Small	1,800	1,824	−1.3%	4.09	440.1/km^{2}
39	Regina Beach	Small	1,790	1,629	+9.9%	2.72	658.1/km^{2}
40	Shaunavon	Small	1,769	1,699	+4.1%	1.73	1,022.5/km^{2}
41	Canora	Small	1,763	1,725	+2.2%	1.66	1,062.0/km^{2}
42	Balgonie	Small	1,736	1,745	−0.5%	1.34	1,295.5/km^{2}
43	Dalmeny	Small	1,703	1,769	−3.7%	1.5	1,135.3/km^{2}
44	Wynyard	Small	1,667	1,732	−3.8%	1.66	1,004.2/km^{2}
45	Kamsack	Small	1,659	1,775	−6.5%	1.6	1,036.9/km^{2}
46	Carlyle	Small	1,519	1,503	+1.1%	2.16	703.2/km^{2}
47	Rosthern	Small	1,475	1,488	−0.9%	1.68	878.0/km^{2}
48	Langham	Small	1,349	1,319	+2.3%	0.88	1,533.0/km^{2}
49	Hudson Bay	Small	1,332	1,368	−2.6%	1.3	1,024.6/km^{2}
50	Shellbrook	Small	1,330	1,277	+4.2%	1.41	943.3/km^{2}
51	Lanigan	Small	1,277	1,245	+2.6%	1.83	697.8/km^{2}
52	Osler	Small	1,251	1,237	+1.1%	1.62	772.2/km^{2}
53	Wadena	Small	1,127	1,139	−1.1%	1.48	761.5/km^{2}
54	Carnduff	Small	1,125	1,023	+10.0%	0.97	1,159.8/km^{2}
55	Wilkie	Small	1,124	1,149	−2.2%	1.51	744.4/km^{2}
56	Waldheim	Small	1,113	1,080	+3.1%	0.99	1,124.2/km^{2}
57	Sandy Bay – Wapaskokimaw 202	Small	1,104	910	+21.3%	2.68	411.9/km^{2}
58	Macklin	Small	1,098	1,193	−8.0%	0.76	1,444.7/km^{2}
59	Foam Lake	Small	1,070	1,022	+4.7%	1.41	758.9/km^{2}
60	Birch Hills	Small	1,066	1,033	+3.2%	2.39	446.0/km^{2}
61	Oxbow	Small	1,051	1,126	−6.7%	1.19	883.2/km^{2}
62	Davidson	Small	1,039	1,038	+0.1%	1.8	577.2/km^{2}
63	Delisle	Small	1,024	1,038	−1.3%	1.08	948.1/km^{2}
64	Caronport	Small	1,008	984	+2.4%	0.99	1,018.2/km^{2}

== See also ==
- List of the largest population centres in Canada
