= Air Ronge =

Village in Saskatchewan, Canada

- Northern village
- Location within Saskatchewan Location within Canada
- Coordinates: 55°5′13.9″N 105°19′54.6″W
- Country: Canada
- Province: Saskatchewan
- District: Northern Saskatchewan Administration District
- Northern village: 1977

Government
  - Type: Mayor–council
  - Mayor: Julie Baschuk
  - MLA Cumberland: Jordan McPhail
  - MP Desnethé— Missinippi— Churchill River: Buckley Belanger

Area
  - Land: 6 km^{2} (2.3 sq mi)

Population (2021)
  - Total: 1,365
  - Density: 230/km^{2} (590/sq mi)
- Time zone: UTC−6 (Central Standard Time)
  - Summer (DST): UTC−5
- Postal code: S0J 0B3
- Website: airronge.ca

Air Ronge is a northern village in Saskatchewan, Canada, 235 km north of Prince Albert. It lies on the western shore of Lac la Ronge, and is 3 km south of La Ronge and Lac La Ronge Provincial Park. According to 2006's census, the northern village is currently growing at 8.1%, and is one of the fastest-growing municipalities in Saskatchewan. There are an additional 3,500 people in La Ronge (though Saskatchewan Tourism claims more than 5,000 as of 2011) and 2,000 in the Lac La Ronge First Nation. The community is on the edge of the Canadian Shield. Highway 2 passes through the community.

== Demographics ==
In the 2021 Census of Population conducted by Statistics Canada, Air Ronge had a population of 1,365 living in 434 of its 465 total private dwellings, a change of 13.8% from its 2016 population of 1,199. With a land area of 6 km^{2} (2.3 sq mi), it had a population density of 227.5/km^{2} (589.2/sq mi) in 2021.

Canada census – Air Ronge community profile

	2021	2011
Population	1,365 (+13.8% from 2016)	1,043 (1.1% from 2006)
Land area	6.00 km^{2} (2.32 sq mi)	6.00 km^{2} (2.32 sq mi)
Population density	227.5/km^{2} (589/sq mi)	173.8/km^{2} (450/sq mi)
Median age	29.4 (M: 28.8, F: 30.4)	31.7 (M: 30.1, F: 33.1)
Private dwellings	465 (total) 434 (occupied)	367 (total)
Median household income	$106,000

References: 2021 2011

== See also ==
- List of communities in Saskatchewan
- List of villages in Saskatchewan
