= Carrot River 29A =

Indian reserve in Saskatchewan, Canada

Coordinates: 53°29′42″N 102°52′34″W

- Indian reserve
- Carrot River Indian Reserve No. 29A
- Location in Saskatchewan
- First Nation: Red Earth
- Country: Canada
- Province: Saskatchewan

Area
  - Total: 825.6 ha (2,040 acres)

Population (2016)
  - Total: 829
  - Density: 100/km^{2} (260/sq mi)
- Community Well-Being Index: 40

Carrot River 29A is an Indian reserve of the Red Earth Cree Nation in Saskatchewan. It is 48 miles east of Nipawin. In the 2016 Canadian Census, it recorded a population of 829 living in 127 of its 127 total private dwellings. In the same year, its Community Well-Being index was calculated at 40 of 100, compared to 58.4 for the average First Nations community and 77.5 for the average non-Indigenous community.

== See also ==
- List of Indian reserves in Saskatchewan
