= Brabant Lake =

Northern settlement in Saskatchewan, Canada

Brabant Lake ᐑᐳᐢᑳᐏ ᓵᑲᐦᐃᑲᓂᕽ wîposkâwi-sâkahikanihk
- Indian settlement
- Interactive map of Brabant Lake
- Coordinates: 56°06′58″N 103°45′05″W
- Country: Canada
- Province: Saskatchewan
- District: Northern Administration District

Population
  - Total: 102

Brabant Lake is an Indian settlement of 102 people located in Northern Saskatchewan, Canada. Brabant Lake is 172 kilometres (107 mi) northeast of La Ronge and 45 kilometres (28 mi) southwest of Southend. The community is located on the northern end of Brabant Lake near the mouth of the Waddy River and is accessed by Highway 102. The traditional name of the community in Cree is ᐑᐳᐢᑳᐏ ᓵᑲᐦᐃᑲᓂᕽ wîposkâwi-sâkahikanihk, meaning 'burnt area lake'.

== Geography ==
Brabant is located in the Precambrian Shield in Saskatchewan's Northern Administration District.

== Demographics ==
The community's population in 2016 was 65, composed of Cree people. 35 people declared that their mother tongue is Cree language, 25 declared English, and 5 declared both Cree and English.

== Industry and tourism ==
Trapping, tourism, and mining are the main industries of the area. A local road provides access to Lower Waddy and Upper Waddy lakes. Near the community, on the shore of Brabant Lake, where Waddy River flows in, is a small, free campground with lake access.

== See also ==
- List of communities in Saskatchewan
