= Little Red River 106D =

Indian reserve in Saskatchewan, Canada

Coordinates: 53°33′31″N 106°03′24″W

- Indian reserve
- Little Red River Indian Reserve No. 106D
- Location in Saskatchewan
- First Nation: Lac La Ronge Indian Band
- Country: Canada
- Province: Saskatchewan

Area
  - Total: 2,590 ha (6,400 acres)

Population (2016)
  - Total: 5
  - Density: 0.19/km^{2} (0.50/sq mi)

Little Red River 106D is an Indian reserve of the Lac La Ronge Indian Band in Saskatchewan. It is 25 miles north of Prince Albert, and in Township 53, Range 1, west of the Third Meridian. In the 2016 Canadian Census, it recorded a population of 5 living in 1 of its 3 total private dwellings.

== See also ==
- List of Indian reserves in Saskatchewan
