= Saskatchewan Highway 102 =

Provincial highway in Saskatchewan, Canada

Highway 102
- CanAm Highway
- Highway 102 highlighted in red

Route information
- Maintained by Ministry of Highways and Infrastructure
- Length: 220.9 km (137.3 mi)

Major junctions
- South end: CanAm Highway / Highway 2 in La Ronge
- North end: Southend

Location
- Country: Canada
- Province: Saskatchewan

Highway system
- Provincial highways in Saskatchewan
← Highway 99	→ Highway 106

Highway 102 is a provincial highway in Saskatchewan, Canada. It runs from Highway 2 at La Ronge and Lac La Ronge Provincial Park to Southend, at Reindeer Lake. The entire route is within the Northern Saskatchewan Administration District. The highway is about 221 kilometres (137 mi) long, the majority of which is gravel surface. The CanAm Highway comprises Saskatchewan Highways 35, 39, 6, 3, 2, and 102.

== Major intersections ==
From south to north:

Location	km	mi	Destinations	Notes
La Ronge	0.0	0.0	Highway 2 south / CanAm Highway south / Brown Street – Prince Albert	Highway 102 southern terminus; continues as Highway 2 south
Lac La Ronge Provincial Park	18.8	11.7	Nemeiben Lake Access Road	
	44.4	27.6	Highway 915 east – Stanley Mission	
	85.2	52.9	Grandmother's Bay Access Road	North of Missinipe
Brabant Lake	171.2	106.4		centre
	194.1	120.6	Highway 905 north – Wollaston Lake Landing, Rabbit Lake mine	
Southend	220.9	137.3		Northern terminus of both Highway 102 and the CanAm Highway
1.000 mi = 1.609 km; 1.000 km = 0.621 mi: Route transition

== See also ==
- Transportation in Saskatchewan
- Roads in Saskatchewan
