= Red Earth First Nation =

Cree community in Saskatchewan, Canada

Red Earth Cree Nation
- Band No. 356
- ᑳ ᒥᐦᑿᐢᑮᐘᑳᕽ kâ-mihkwaskîwakâhk
- People: Swampy Cree
- Treaty: Treaty 5
- Headquarters: Red Earth
- Province: Saskatchewan

Land
- Other reserves: Red Earth 29; Carrot River 29A
- Land area: 22.809 km^{2} (8.807 sq mi)

Population (2019)
- On reserve: 1586
- Off reserve: 306
- Total population: 1892

Government
- Chief: Fabian Head

Tribal Council
- Prince Albert Grand Council

Website
- redearthcreenation.com

Red Earth Cree Nation (Cree: ᑳ ᒥᐦᑿᐢᑮᐘᑳᕽ kâ-mihkwaskîwakâhk) is a Cree community in Saskatchewan, Canada. It is located 225 kilometres (140 miles) northeast of Prince Albert. The main settlement of Red Earth is located on the Carrot River and accessed by Highway 55. Nearby to the east is the Shoal Lake First Nation.

== Demographics ==
The total registered population was 1,869 as of October, 2018 with 1,602 members living on reserve. Red Earth First Nation has two reserves "Carrot River 29A" which has an area of 825.60 hectares (2,040.1 acres) at coordinates 53.4950°N 102.8759°W containing the settlement of Red Earth and "Red Earth 29" which has an area of 1,455.30 hectares (3,596.1 acres) at coordinates 53.4412°N 102.8731°W.

== Government ==
Through a Custom Electoral System the members elect a Chief and 4 councillors. The band office is located in the settlement of Red Earth.

== Education ==
Kiwaytinok Elementary School and John William Head Memorial Education Centre offer Kindergarten to Grade 12.
