= Shoal Lake Cree Nation =

First Nation in Saskatchewan, Canada

- Band No. 357
- ᐹᐦᒁᐤ ᓵᑲᐦᐃᑲᓂᕽ pâhkwâw-sâkahikanihk
- People: Swampy Cree
- Treaty: Treaty 5
- Headquarters: Pakwaw Lake
- Province: Saskatchewan

Land
- Other reserve: Shoal Lake 28A
- Land area: 14.79 km^{2} (5.71 sq mi)

Population (2019)
- On reserve: 874
- On other land: 1
- Off reserve: 244
- Total population: 1119

Government
- Chief: Marcel Head
- Council: Berl Whitecap, Edgar Cook, Rayme Whitecap and Rose Sinclair

Tribal Council
- Prince Albert Grand Council

The Shoal Lake Cree Nation (Cree: ᐹᐦᒁᐤ ᓵᑲᐦᐃᑲᓂᕽ pâhkwâw-sâkahikanihk) is a Swampy Cree First Nations band government in Saskatchewan, Canada located 98 kilometres (61 miles) east of Nipawin. The Cree First Nation is on the Carrot River and can be accessed by Highway 55. Nearby to the west is the Red Earth First Nation.

== Demographics ==
The total registered population was 1,081 as of October, 2018 with 889 members living on reserve. Shoal Lake First Nation has one reserve "Shoal Lake 28A" which has an area of 1,479 hectares (3,650 acres) at coordinates 53.4812°N 102.6297°W.

== Government ==
Through a Custom Electoral System the members elect a Chief and 4 councillors. The band office is located in the settlement of Pakwaw Lake on the reserve.

== Education ==
The Wacihk Education Complex in Pakwaw Lake offers kindergarten to grade 12 to about 220 students.
