= Lac la Ronge =

Glacial lake in Saskatchewan, Canada

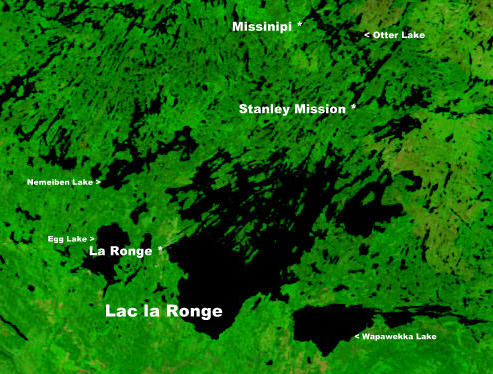
- NASA image of Lac la Ronge

- Location of Lac la Ronge in Saskatchewan Lac la Ronge (Canada)
- Location: Northern Administration District, Saskatchewan
- Coordinates: 55°10′N 105°00′W
- Type: Glacial lake
- Part of: Churchill River drainage basin
- Primary inflows: Montreal River; Bow River; Nemeiben Creek; Nipekamew River; Meeyomoot River
- Primary outflows: Rapid River
- Catchment area: 10,000 km^{2} (3,900 sq mi)
- Basin countries: Canada
- Surface area: 1,413 km^{2} (546 sq mi)
- Average depth: 14.6 m (48 ft)
- Max. depth: 42.1 m (138 ft)
- Water volume: 17.6 km^{3} (14,300,000 acre⋅ft)
- Shore length^{1}: 1,015 km (631 mi)
- Surface elevation: 364 m (1,194 ft)
- Islands: 1,305
- Settlements: La Ronge; Air Ronge; Lac La Ronge First Nation
- ^{1} Shore length is not a well-defined measure.

Lac la Ronge is a glacial lake in the Canadian province of Saskatchewan. It is the fifth largest lake in the province and is approximately 250 kilometres (160 mi) north of Prince Albert, on the edge of the Canadian Shield. La Ronge, Air Ronge, and the Lac La Ronge First Nation are on the western shore. The lake is a popular vacation spot. Recreational activities include fishing, boating, canoeing, hiking, and camping.

== Recreation and access ==
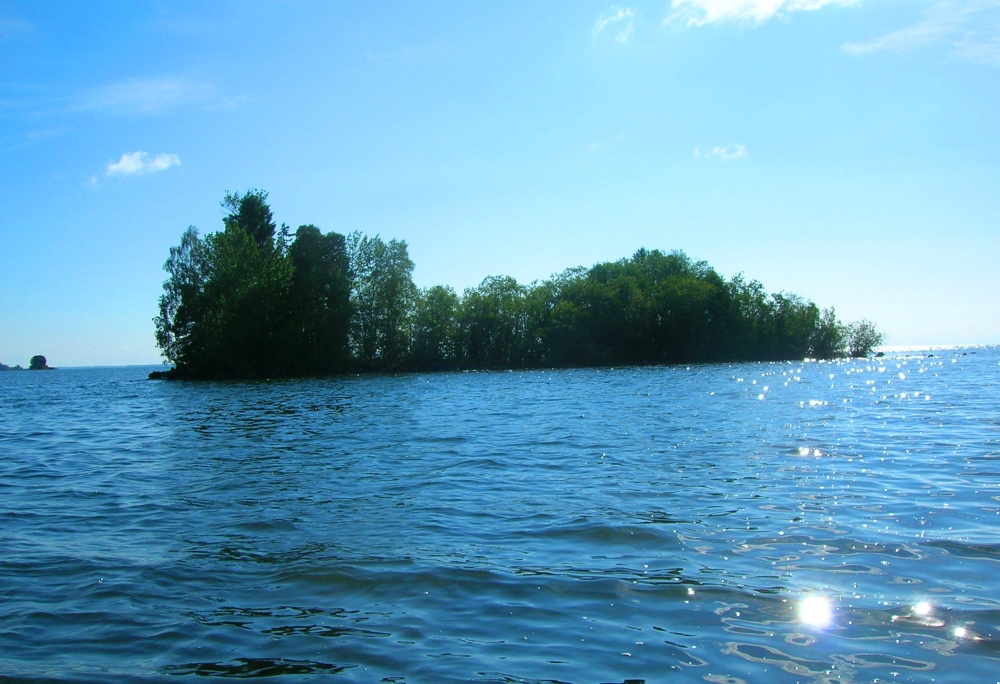
Island on Lac la Ronge

Lac La Ronge Provincial Park extends around the lake on three sides, starting at La Ronge and ending along the east shore. The park contains four RV parks, two of which are on the west shore of the lake, one is in the town of Missinipe (Missinipe is the Woodland Cree name for the Churchill River which is on the south-west shore of Otter Lake, which flows through the north side of the park), and the fourth one is on the east shore of Nemeiben Lake. There is also a hunting and fishing lodge 26 kilometres (16 mi) north of La Ronge. Nistowiak Falls, on the Rapid River, which is the lake's primary outflow into the Churchill River and one of the tallest falls in Saskatchewan can be observed by canoe trails on the north side of the park.

Highway 2 passes the lake on the west side, ending at La Ronge, where it becomes Highway 102. Stanley Mission can be accessed by Highway 915 on the north side of the park. The community is on the shores of the Churchill River across from the Holy Trinity Anglican Church, Saskatchewan's oldest building.

== Lac la Ronge Dam ==
The Lac la Ronge Dam (55.3358°N 104.5346°W), which is an embankment dam, was constructed at the source of the Rapid River in 1966 to regulate the lake's water levels. It is 3.7 metres (12 ft) high and contains four gates. The dam was upgraded in 2007 and a fish ladder was installed. Further upgrades were undertaken between 2017 and 2022 at a cost of $2.7 million. The upgrades included "strengthening the control structure and adding a modern steel structure over the spillway to install and remove stoplogs, along with seepage remediation".

== Island ecology ==
The lake's numerous islands have been the focus of biogeography studies investigating how island size and isolation influence the wildlife inhabiting them. In the northern half of the lake, you'll find over 1,300 ice age-carved granite islands.

== Fish species ==
The lake's large bodied fish species include: walleye, yellow perch, northern pike, lake trout, lake whitefish, cisco, white sucker, longnose sucker, and burbot.

Unlike other lakes in Saskatchewan, in addition to a provincial angling licence, a special angling endorsement was required to fish on Lac la Ronge from 1997 until 2017. The Lac la Ronge endorsement allowed anglers to keep up to four lake trout annually from the lake. It was put in place to reduce the harvest from sport fishing after the collapse of the lake trout population within Lac la Ronge. The endorsement was available free of charge from the Ministry of Environment office in La Ronge. Beginning in 2015, the Ministry also required anglers to keep a "Harvest Ledger", which was given alongside the endorsement to record when Lake Trout were harvested. In May 2017 when the 2017–18 fishing season opened the Saskatchewan Ministry of Environment discontinued the endorsement and "Harvest Ledger" requirement.

Lac la Ronge may now be fished with only a provincial angling licence but has reduced limits for lake trout, northern pike, and walleye, along with the mandatory use of barbless hooks.

== See also ==
- Saskatchewan Water Security Agency
- List of dams and reservoirs in Canada
- List of lakes of Saskatchewan
