= Sawridge 150 =

Sawridge 150 may refer to one of two nearby Indian reserves in Alberta, Canada, both owned by the Sawridge First Nation:

- Sawridge 150G, east of the town of Slave Lake
- Sawridge 150H, west of the town of Slave Lake
