= Grandmother's Bay 219 =

Indian reserve in Saskatchewan, Canada

Coordinates: 55°36′44″N 104°35′59″W

Grandmother's Bay 219 ᑯᐦᑯᒥᓈᓂᕽ kohkominânihk
- Indian reserve
- Grandmother's Bay Indian Reserve No. 219
- Location in Saskatchewan
- First Nation: Lac La Ronge Indian Band
- Country: Canada
- Province: Saskatchewan

Area
  - Total: 4,488.9 ha (11,092 acres)

Population (2016)
  - Total: 342
  - Density: 7.62/km^{2} (19.7/sq mi)
- Community Well-Being Index: 44

Grandmother's Bay 219 (Woods Cree: ᑯᐦᑯᒥᓈᓂᕽ, romanized: kohkominânihk) is an Indian reserve of the Lac La Ronge Indian Band in Saskatchewan. Located on Otter Lake, part of the Churchill River system, it is about 77 kilometres (48 mi) north-east of Lac la Ronge. In the 2016 Canadian Census, it recorded a population of 342 living in 101 of its 115 total private dwellings. In the same year, its Community Well-Being index was calculated at 44 of 100, compared to 58.4 for the average First Nations community and 77.5 for the average non-Indigenous community.

== See also ==
- List of Indian reserves in Saskatchewan
