= Sucker River 156C =

Indian reserve in Saskatchewan, Canada

Coordinates: 55°17′06″N 105°09′59″W

- Indian reserve
- Sucker River Indian Reserve No. 156C
- Location in Saskatchewan
- First Nation: Lac La Ronge Indian Band
- Country: Canada
- Province: Saskatchewan

Area
  - Total: 154.8 ha (383 acres)

Population (2016)
  - Total: 416
  - Density: 269/km^{2} (696/sq mi)
- Community Well-Being Index: 49

Sucker River 156C is an Indian reserve of the Lac La Ronge Indian Band in Saskatchewan. It is at the mouth of the Nemeiben River on Lac la Ronge, about 230 kilometres (140 mi) north of Prince Albert. In the 2016 Canadian Census, it recorded a population of 416 living in 109 of its 124 total private dwellings. In the same year, its Community Well-Being index was calculated at 49 of 100, compared to 58.4 for the average First Nations community and 77.5 for the average non-Indigenous community.

== See also ==
- List of Indian reserves in Saskatchewan
