= Stanley 157 =

Indian reserve in Saskatchewan, Canada

Coordinates: 55°24′14″N 104°34′11″W

- Indian reserve
- Stanley Indian Reserve No. 157
- Location in Saskatchewan
- First Nation: Lac La Ronge Indian Band
- Country: Canada
- Province: Saskatchewan

Area
  - Total: 251.3 ha (621 acres)

Population (2016)
  - Total: 1,840
  - Density: 732/km^{2} (1,900/sq mi)
- Community Well-Being Index: 52

Stanley 157 is an Indian reserve of the Lac La Ronge Indian Band in Saskatchewan. It is adjacent to Stanley Mission. In the 2016 Canadian Census, it recorded a population of 1840 living in 451 of its 466 total private dwellings. In the same year, its Community Well-Being index was calculated at 52 of 100, compared to 58.4 for the average First Nations community and 77.5 for the average non-Indigenous community.

== See also ==
- List of Indian reserves in Saskatchewan
