= Red Earth 29 =

Indian reserve in Saskatchewan, Canada

Coordinates: 53°26′29″N 102°52′24″W

- Indian reserve
- Red Earth Indian Reserve No. 29
- Location in Saskatchewan
- First Nation: Red Earth
- Country: Canada
- Province: Saskatchewan

Area
  - Total: 1,455.3 ha (3,596 acres)

Population (2016)
  - Total: 334
  - Density: 23.0/km^{2} (59.4/sq mi)
- Community Well-Being Index: 40

Red Earth 29 is an Indian reserve of the Red Earth Cree Nation in Saskatchewan. It is about 75 kilometres (47 mi) east of Nipawin. In the 2016 Canadian Census, it recorded a population of 334 living in 61 of its 82 total private dwellings. In the same year, its Community Well-Being index was calculated at 40 of 100, compared to 58.4 for the average First Nations community and 77.5 for the average non-Indigenous community.

== See also ==
- List of Indian reserves in Saskatchewan
