= Shoal Lake 28A =

Indian reserve in Saskatchewan, Canada

Coordinates: 53°29′46″N 102°38′12″W

- Indian reserve
- Shoal Lake Indian Reserve No. 28A
- Location in Saskatchewan
- First Nation: Shoal Lake
- Country: Canada
- Province: Saskatchewan

Area
  - Total: 1,479 ha (3,650 acres)

Population (2016)
  - Total: 424
  - Density: 28.7/km^{2} (74.2/sq mi)
- Community Well-Being Index: 46

Shoal Lake 28A is an Indian reserve of the Shoal Lake Cree Nation in Saskatchewan. It is about 92 kilometres (57 mi) east of Nipawin. In the 2016 Canadian Census, it recorded a population of 424 living in 115 of its 118 total private dwellings. In the same year, its Community Well-Being index was calculated at 46 of 100, compared to 58.4 for the average First Nations community and 77.5 for the average non-Indigenous community.

== See also ==
- List of Indian reserves in Saskatchewan
