= Holy Trinity Anglican Church Provincial Historic Site =

Historic site in Saskatchewan, Canada

Holy Trinity Anglican Church
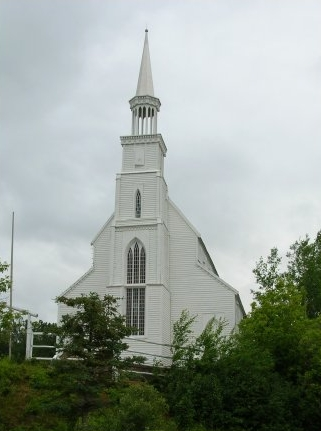
- Front of church from the water 2007

General information
- Architectural style: Carpenter Gothic
- Location: Stanley Mission, Saskatchewan, Canada
- Coordinates: 55°25′3.25″N 104°33′2.5″W
- Construction started: 1854
- Completed: 1860

Technical details
- Structural system: Post and beam, wood frame

Design and construction
- Architect: The Rev. Robert Hunt

National Historic Site of Canada
- Official name: Holy Trinity Church National Historic Site of Canada
- Designated: 1970

Holy Trinity Anglican Church is a national and provincial historic site in Saskatchewan, Canada. It is a Carpenter Gothic style Anglican church located on the banks of the Churchill River across from Stanley Mission. The site is operated by Sask Parks.

Access is by boat from Stanely Mission.

== History ==
Designed by the Rev. Robert Hunt, an English missionary who founded Stanley Mission in 1851 with the permission of the Hudson's Bay Company, it was built between 1854 and 1860 by local Cree craftsmen using locally cut lumber as well as hardware and stained glass that Hunt had brought from England. The church was at one time the centre of an active missionary complex that included nearly 30 supporting buildings and a cemetery. It is currently the oldest standing building in Saskatchewan and the "oldest wood-frame church west of the Red River". Although not the seat of a bishop, it has been called a cathedral because of its massive size with a tall central nave and elaborate spire.

Holy Trinity Anglican Church was designated a National Historic Site of Canada in 1970. It is also a provincially registered historic site as designated by the government of Saskatchewan on August 26, 1981. A ceremony celebrating the church's 150th anniversary was held on June 10, 2010.

== See also ==
- List of protected areas of Saskatchewan
