= Little Red River 106C =

Indian reserve in Saskatchewan, Canada

Coordinates: 53°29′09″N 105°55′39″W

- Indian reserve
- Little Red River Indian Reserve No. 106C
- Location in Saskatchewan
- First Nation: Lac La Ronge Indian Band
- Country: Canada
- Province: Saskatchewan

Area
  - Total: 12,939.3 ha (31,974 acres)

Population (2016)
  - Total: 354
  - Density: 2.74/km^{2} (7.09/sq mi)
- Community Well-Being Index: 48

Little Red River 106C is an Indian reserve of the Lac La Ronge Indian Band in Saskatchewan. It is about 34 kilometres (21 mi) north of Prince Albert. In the 2016 Canadian Census, it recorded a population of 354 living in 88 of its 98 total private dwellings. In the same year, its Community Well-Being index was calculated at 48 of 100, compared to 58.4 for the average First Nations community and 77.5 for the average non-Indigenous community.

== See also ==
- List of Indian reserves in Saskatchewan
