= Woodland Cree =

Ethnic group

Nīhithaw / Īthiniw "Indigenous person" / "human being"
- Person: Woods: Nīhithaw ᓃᐦᐃᖬᐤ; Rocky: Īthiniw ᐁᖨᓂᐤ
- People: W: Nīhithawak ᓃᐦᐃᖬᐘᐠ; R: Īthiniwak ᐁᖨᓂᐘᐠ
- Language: W: Nīhithawīwin ᓃᐦᐃᖬᐑᐏᐣ; R: Īthiniwīwin ᐁᖨᓂᐑᐏᐣ; Hand Talk
- Country: W: Nīhithawīaskiy ᓃᐦᐃᖬᐍᐊᐢᑭᐩ; R: Īthiniwaskiy ᐁᖨᓂᐗᐢᑭᐩ

The Sakāwithiniwak or Woodland Cree, are a Cree people, calling themselves Nîhithaw in their own dialect of the language. They are the largest indigenous group in northern Alberta and are an Algonquian people. Prior to the 18th century, their territory extended west of Hudson Bay, as far north as Churchill. Although in western Northern Saskatchewan and Manitoba, by the 18th century, they acted as middlemen in trade with western tribes. After acquiring guns through trade, they greatly expanded their territory and drove other tribes further west and north.

The Rocky Cree or Asinikaw Īthiniwak are often grouped alongside the Woodland Cree, though many see them as a distinct group of Cree. The Rocky Cree once spoke a distinct "r" dialect of Cree before assimilating into the Woodland "th" dialect.

== Culture ==
Their lodges varied in materials depending upon where they lived. In the southern areas they lived in birch-bark wigwams, and further north, where birch was more stunted, they used coverings of pine boughs and caribou hide over conical structures. There was a clear division of labour among men and women. The men hunted, fished, made canoes, sledges, hunting tools and weapons of war. The women foraged, snared rabbits and other small mammals, tanned hides, cut firewood, made snowshoes, pitched tents, hauled wood, wove fish nets, and made clothing adorned with quill- and bead-work. Coats and blankets were made from woven hare skin or soft caribou fur. In the spring and autumn the Woodland Cree hunted ducks and geese, and ptarmigan in the winter. Like many other tribes that depended upon snowshoe hares for food and clothing, they were affected by the periodic decline in populations, especially in the ninth and tenth years when hares almost altogether disappeared. Winter was a particularly difficult time for the Woodland Cree.

== Post-Contact ==
The Woodland Cree were one of the first Aboriginal nations west of Hudson Bay to trade with European fur traders, as early as the 17th century. They became very closely associated with the fur trade and adapted their clothing and many aspects of their lifestyle and culture to European ways. Considered excellent hunters and trappers, they provided meat and pemmican to the fur trade posts and furs, either directly, or indirectly from trade with other tribes. Marriages or alliances between Cree women and fur traders became an essential link in fur trade negotiations. Because families were on the move most of the time, women in childbirth often had their babies on the trail.

The offspring of this alliance formed the basis of a new nation of people, the Métis, who adopted the lifestyle of their mother's people or of Europeans and received education in order to become clerks and traders for the North West and Hudson's Bay Companies. By 1800, the Cree were well established in Alberta, from Athabasca-Peace delta in the north, along the Peace River and south as far as the Saskatchewan River.

Woodland Cree use legends to convey stories throughout time. Many legends are about aspects of the environment, such as "How the raven stole the sun" and "Deawitchita and the fire rock." It is said that those who tell the legends have the most ikanisha, which means wisdom in woodland cree.

== Woodland Cree historical groups ==
- As'in'i'wa'chi Ni'yaw Nation ('People who live along the Rocky Mountains'); including groups of Dane-zaa (Beaver) as well as Iroquois trappers and voyageurs who came to the territory with the North West Company in the 18th century and intermarried with the First Nation - forerunners of today's Kelly Lake Cree Nation.
  - Rocky Cree / Mountain Cree (Asini Wachi Nīhithawī), Cree groups of the Asini Wachi Wi Iniwak ("People of the rocky [land]') or Asinīwaciwithiniwak ('People who live along the Rocky Mountains'); including groups of Assiniboine, Iroquois, Danezaa, Sekani, Ojibwe and Secwepemc) Primarily gathered in the Rocky Mountain region of Alberta.
- Rocky Cree / Rock Cree. Primarily gathered in northern Saskatchewan and Manitoba. Forerunners of today's Lac La Ronge First Nation, Peter Ballantyne Cree Nation and Montreal Lake Cree Nation
  - Nelson River Cree (Nisichawayasi Nehethowak) (Nisichawayasihk - 'Place, where three rivers meet'), lived from the Upper Nelson River west towards the Sturgeon-Weir River - forerunners of today's Rocky Cree nations of Nisichawayasihk Cree Nation and O-Pipon-Na-Piwin Cree Nation.
  - Churchill River Cree or Minnisippi Cree (Minisipi Īthiniwak - People who live along the Churchill River.) Named after the Cree name for the Churchill River, Minnisippi, which translates to "large body of water.". Forerunners of today's Mathias Colomb First Nation.
  - Asini Pwat-sak (Ye Xa Ya Bine Nakoda or Hebina Assiniboine, Assiniboine groups of the Asini Wachi Wi Iniwak), also known as Strong Wood or Thickwood Assiniboine, including Métis, Secwepemc, Kutenai, and Plains Cree - forerunners of today's Stoney Nakoda Nation, comprising the Wesley's (Goodstoney's), Chiniki and Bearspaw First Nations.
  - Cross Lake Cree (Pimicikamāk - 'flowing across', Pimicikamak Iniwak, Pimicikamāk Nīhithawī - 'People of the Lake that lies Athwart', also Nikikonakos - 'Otter People'), lived at the shores of Cross Lake and at the watershed of the Upper Nelson River, north of today Winnipeg, Manitoba, including Mistowaiau-Wininiwuk - 'Winnepeg People' of the Plains Ojibwe and Assiniboine - forerunners of today's Cross Lake First Nation and Pimicikamak Cree Nation, also known as 'Cross Lake Band', therefore oft confused with the 'Cross Lake First Nation', the Nikikonakos - 'Otter People'.
- Woods Cree / Bush Cree or Sakāwithini(wak) ('Woods-people') or Sakā-Nīhithawīk ('Woods Cree'); including groups of Assiniboine, Iroquois, Chipewyan, Dane-zaa, Slavey, Saulteaux - forerunners of today's Alexander First Nation, Whitefish Lake First Nation, West Moberly First Nations, Saulteau First Nations, Fort Nelson First Nation, Blueberry River First Nations, Fort McMurray First Nation, Fort McKay First Nation
  - Lesser Slave Lake Cree - forerunners of today's Bigstone Cree Nation, Peerless Trout First Nation, Driftpile First Nation, Kapawe'no First Nation, Sawridge First Nation, Sucker Creek Cree First Nation, Swan River First Nation.
  - Athabasca Lake Cree or Āyapāskāwiyiniwak, along the shores of Lake Athabasca, north of Lesser Slave Lake, between the Wabasca River and Peace River - forerunners of today's Bigstone Cree First Nation, Lubicon Lake Nation, Tallcree First Nation, Little Red River Cree Nation, Mikisew Cree First Nation and Woodland Cree First Nation.
  - Woodland / Bush Assiniboine (in Cree: Saka Pwat-sak, Saka Wi Pwacak, Sakbwatsûk - 'Assiniboines of the Woodland'), groups of the Saka Wi Iniwak, including Woodland Cree, Métis, Danezaa, and Iroquois - forerunners of today's Alexis Nakota Sioux First Nation and Paul First Nation.
  - Beaver Lake Cree (Amisk Sakahikan Wi Iniwak - 'People of the Beaver Lake'), lived along the shores of Beaver Lake and Lac La Biche - forerunners of today's Beaver Lake Cree Nation.
  - Beaver River Cree (Amisk Sipi Wi Iniwak, Amisksipiwiyiniwak - 'People of the Beaver River'), lived along the Beaver River, which originates in the Lac La Biche Lake, and enters in the Churchill River.
  - Saki Ta-wa Ininiwak (Sakitawa Wi Iniwak, 'People of the place where the rivers flow out/meet'), the name for the Île-à-la-Crosse, lived between the Beaver River and Île-à-la-Crosse, including many Métis - forerunners of today's Canoe Lake Cree Nation.

== See also ==
- Cree
- First Nations in Alberta
- List of Indian reserves in Saskatchewan
- RAVEN (Respecting Aboriginal Values & Environmental Needs)
