= Northern Saskatchewan Administration District =

- Unincorporated area
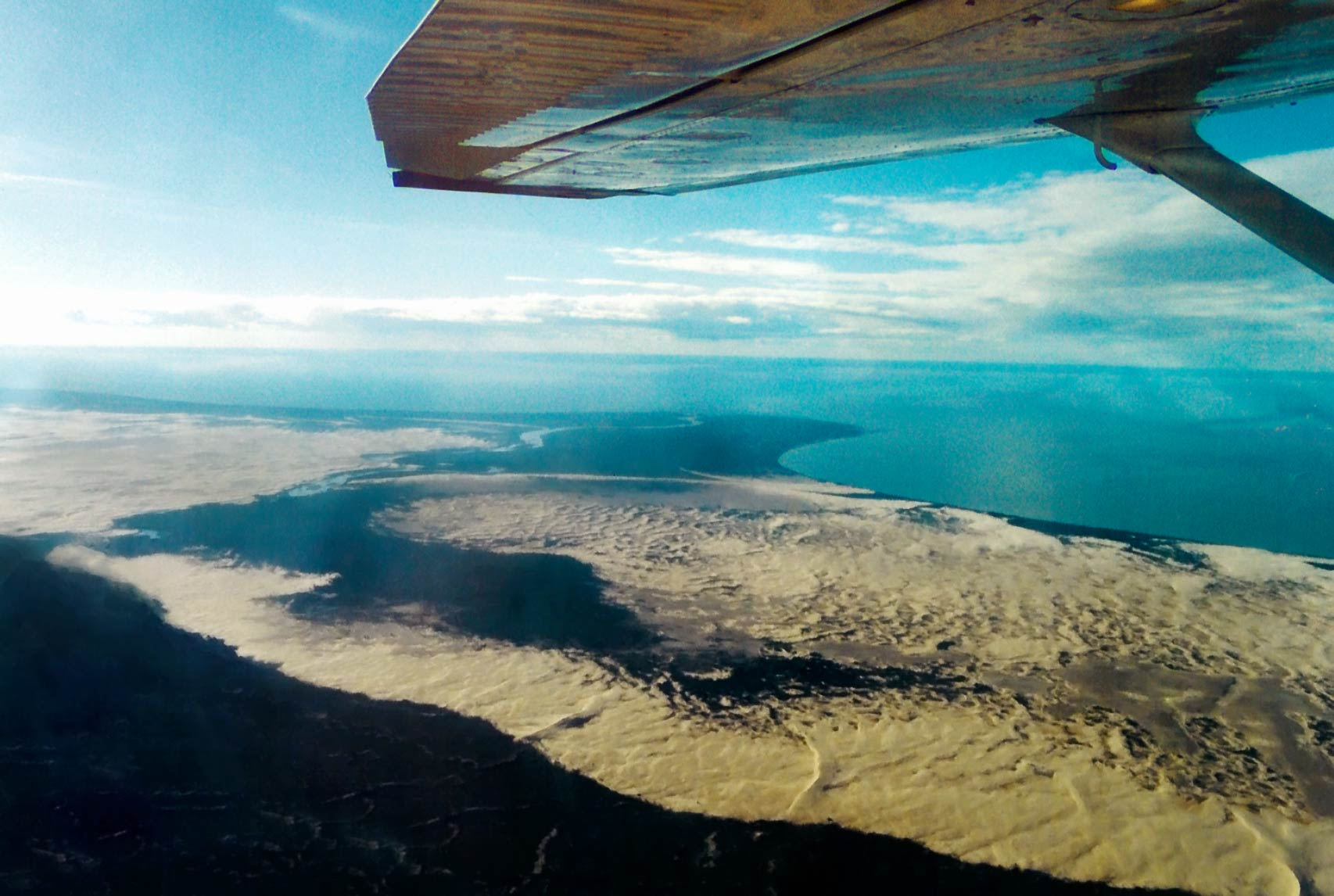
- The Athabasca Sand Dunes

- Location within Saskatchewan
- Country: Canada
- Province: Saskatchewan
- Census division: Division No. 18

Area
  - Total: 269,997.26 km^{2} (104,246.52 sq mi)

Population (2021)
  - Total: 35,986 (Census Division No. 18)
  - Density: 0.13328/km^{2} (0.34520/sq mi)

The Northern Saskatchewan Administration District (NSAD) is the unincorporated area of Northern Saskatchewan, Canada. It encompasses approximately half of Saskatchewan's land mass. Despite its extent, the majority of Saskatchewanians live in the southern half of the province, while the majority of northern Saskatchewanians live in incorporated municipalities outside the NSAD's jurisdiction. The area is co-extensive with Division No. 18, Saskatchewan, one of Statistics Canada's census divisions in the province for its 2016 census.

The census division is the largest in the province in terms of area at 269,996.55 square kilometres (104,246.25 mi^{2}), representing 46 per cent of the province's entire area of 588,239.21 square kilometres (227,120.43 mi^{2}).

The most populous communities in the census division are La Ronge and La Loche with populations of 2,743 and 2,611 respectively.

The 2016 census also refers to the Unorganized Division No. 18, which counted only 1,115 residents, which placed its population density at 250 square kilometres (97 sq mi) for every inhabitant. The district has no local government and is directly subject to the Minister of Government Relations.

== History ==
An unincorporated Northern Saskatchewan region was first established by the 1948 Northern Administration Act.

== Demographics ==
In the 2021 Census of Population conducted by Statistics Canada, Division No. 18 had a population of 35,986 living in 10,475 of its 12,843 total private dwellings, a change of −2.9% from its 2016 population of 37,064. With a land area of 262,280.94 km^{2} (101,267.24 sq mi), it had a population density of 0.1/km^{2} (0.4/sq mi) in 2021.

Division No. 18, Unorganized is an unorganized area in northern Saskatchewan. It consists of all of Division No. 18, excluding municipalities and reserves. It has a population of 1,641 as of 2011, and an area of 268,389.99 km^{2}.

== Census subdivisions ==
Division No. 18 has 58 census subdivisions, of which 24 are municipalities (including a portion of the city of Flin Flon, a city bisected by the Saskatchewan-Manitoba border, 2 northern towns, 11 northern villages and 10 northern hamlets), 32 are First Nations communities (31 Indian reserves and an Indian settlement), an unincorporated northern settlement and the unorganized balance of Division No. 18. All municipalities within the census division, except for the Northern Hamlet of Black Point, are recognized as census subdivisions.

=== Cities ===
Name	Status	Population (2011)	Population (2006)	Change (%)	Area (km^{2})	Population density
Flin Flon (part)	City	229	242	−5.4	2.37	96.4

=== Northern towns ===
Name	Status	Population (2011)	Population (2006)	Change (%)	Area (km^{2})	Population density
Creighton	Northern town	1,498	1,502	−0.3	14.39	104.1
La Ronge	Northern town	2,743	2,725	0.7	11.86	231.4

=== Northern villages ===
Name	Status	Population (2011)	Population (2006)	Change (%)	Area (km^{2})	Population density
Air Ronge	Northern village	1,043	1,032	1.1	6	173.8
Beauval	Northern village	756	806	−6.2	6.71	112.6
Buffalo Narrows	Northern village	1,153	1,081	6.7	68.63	16.8
Cumberland House	Northern village	772	810	−4.7	15.69	49.2
Denare Beach	Northern village	669	785	−14.8	5.84	114.5
Green Lake	Northern village	418	361	15.8	121.92	3.4
Île-à-la-Crosse	Northern village	1,365	1,341	1.8	23.84	57.3
La Loche	Northern village	2,611	2,348	11.2	15.59	167.5
Pelican Narrows	Northern village	790	599	31.9	3.7	213.3
Pinehouse	Northern village	978	1,076	−9.1	6.84	142.9
Sandy Bay	Northern village	1,233	1,175	4.9	14.85	83

=== Northern hamlets ===
Name	Status	Population (2011)	Population (2006)	Change (%)	Area (km^{2})	Population density
Unorganized Division No. 18	Unorganized	1,641	1,181	39	268,389.99	0
Cole Bay	Northern hamlet	230	156	47.4	4.95	46.5
Dore Lake	Northern hamlet	28	30	−6.7	8.03	3.5
Jans Bay	Northern hamlet	187	181	3.3	5.94	31.5
Michel Village	Northern hamlet	66	79	−16.5	3.73	17.7
Patuanak	Northern hamlet	64	84	−23.8	1.34	47.6
St. George's Hill	Northern hamlet	100	19	426.3	1.46	68.7
Stony Rapids	Northern hamlet	243	255	−4.7	3.96	61.3
Timber Bay	Northern hamlet	93	139	−33.1	4.44	20.9
Turnor Lake	Northern hamlet	0	115	−100	4.62	0
Weyakwin	Northern hamlet	135	99	36.4	8.2	16.5

=== Indian settlements ===
Name	Status	Population (2011)	Population (2006)	Change (%)	Area (km^{2})	Population density
Brabant Lake	Indian settlement	51	66	−22.7	3.71	13.7

=== Indian reserves ===
Name	Status	Population (2011)	Population (2006)	Change (%)	Area (km^{2})	Population density
Buffalo River Dene Nation 193 (Peter Pond Lake 193)	Indian reserve	764	741	3.1	86.32	8.9
Canoe Lake 165	Indian reserve	716	822	−12.9	25.71	27.9
Chicken 224	Indian reserve	1,070	1,109	−3.5	234.44	4.6
Chicken 225	Indian reserve	0	46	−100	21	0
Clearwater River Dene 222	Indian reserve	778	658	18.2	30.5	25.5
Clearwater River Dene Band 223	Indian reserve	19	15	26.7	9.66	2
Cumberland House Cree Nation 20	Indian reserve	715	595	20.2	16.48	43.4
Fond du Lac 227	Indian reserve	874	801	9.1	138.26	6.3
Fond du Lac 229	Indian reserve	0	0	—	88.42	0
Fond du Lac 231	Indian reserve	0	0	—	17.44	0
Fond du Lac 232	Indian reserve	0	0	—	17.83	0
Four Portages 157C	Indian reserve	0	0	—	8.02	0
Grandmother's Bay 219	Indian reserve	337	320	5.3	49.7	6.8
Kimosom Pwatinahk 203 (Deschambault Lake)	Indian reserve	1,194	821	45.4	8.04	148.5
Kinoosao-Thomas Clark 204	Indian reserve	40	57	−29.8	0.42	94.7
Kitsakie 156B	Indian reserve	644	671	−4	1.06	606.6
La Plonge 192	Indian reserve	115	139	−17.3	91.22	1.3
Lac La Hache 220	Indian reserve	1,251	988	26.6	110.87	11.3
Lac La Ronge 156	Indian reserve	1,914	1,534	24.8	9.1	210.2
Little Hills 158	Indian reserve	0	5	−100	6.58	0
Little Hills 158B	Indian reserve	0	5	−100	2.04	0
Montreal Lake 106	Indian reserve	999	880	13.5	60.96	16.4
Morin Lake 217	Indian reserve	618	406	52.2	105.94	5.8
Pelican Narrows 184B	Indian reserve	1,913	1,342	42.5	5.46	350.5
Potato River 156A	Indian reserve	0	0	—	3.73	0
Southend 200	Indian reserve	904	910	−0.7	37.64	24
Stanley 157	Indian reserve	1,634	1,467	11.4	3.13	522.1
Sturgeon Weir 184F	Indian reserve	61	66	−7.6	24.11	2.5
Sucker River 156C (Nemebien River 156C)	Indian reserve	400	290	37.9	1.38	289.2
Turnor Lake 193B	Indian reserve	419	413	1.5	1.12	375.4
Wapachewunak 192D	Indian reserve	482	526	−8.4	19.48	24.7

=== Unincorporated communities ===
A northern settlement is an unincorporated community in the Northern Saskatchewan Administration District, and its administration is regulated by The Northern Municipalities Act. Saskatchewan has 11 northern settlements. One northern settlement, Missinipe, is recognized as a census subdivision by Statistics Canada.

Name	Population (2011)
Bear Creek	47
Brabant Lake	102
Camsell Portage	37
Descharme Lake	42
Garson Lake	34
Missinipe	39
Sled Lake	35
Southend	35
Stanley Mission	124
Uranium City	201
Wollaston Lake	129

== See also ==
- Unorganized Yukon, a comparable part of Yukon
- Unincorporated Far West Region of New South Wales, a comparable part of Australia
- Unorganized Borough, Alaska
