= Lac La Ronge Indian Band =

Cree First Nation in La Ronge, Saskatchewan

Lac La Ronge Indian Band Band No. 353 ᒥᐢᑕᐦᐃ ᓵᑲᐦᐃᑲᓂᕽ mistahi-sâkahikanihk
- People: Woodland Cree
- Treaty: Treaty 6
- Headquarters: La Ronge
- Province: Saskatchewan

Land
- Reserve(s): Little Red River 106C; Little Red River 106D; Lac la Ronge 156; Potato River 156A; Kitsakie 156B; Sucker River 156C; Stanley 157; Stanley 157A; Old Fort 157B; Four Portages 157C; Fox Point 157D; Fox Point 157E; Little Hills 158; Little Hills 158A; Little Hills 158B; Morin Lake 217; Bittern Lake 218; Grandmother's Bay 219; Kiskinwuhumatowin
- Land area: 43,305 ha (107,009 acres) km^{2}

Population (2024)
- On reserve: 7,614
- Off reserve: 4,648
- Total population: 12,262

Government
- Chief: Tammy Cook-Searson
- Council: Devin Bernatchez; Jimmy Charles; Linda Charles; John Boy Halkett; Gerald McKenzie; Robin McKenzie; Keith Mirasty; Ann Ratt; Dean Roberts; Sam Roberts; Norman Ross; Charlene Venne

Tribal Council
- Prince Albert Grand Council

Website
- llrib.com

The Lac La Ronge Indian Band (Woods Cree: ᒥᐢᑕᐦᐃ ᓵᑲᐦᐃᑲᓂᕽ, romanized: mistahi-sâkahikanihk) is a Woodland Cree (Sakāwithiniwak) First Nations in northern Saskatchewan. It is one of the ten largest Cree (Nîhithaw) band governments in Canada, the largest First Nation in Saskatchewan, with the administrative centre located in La Ronge.

== History ==
La Ronge & Stanley Mission Band of Woods Cree Indians became a signatory to the Treaty 6 on February 11, 1889, signed by Chief James Roberts. In 1900, Peter Ballantyne was allowed to separate from the La Ronge and Stanley Mission Band to form the Peter Ballantyne Band of Cree Indians, the predecessor to the Peter Ballantyne Cree Nation. In 1910, the La Ronge & Stanley Mission Band split into two entities: Amos Charles Band of Cree Indians (located in Stanley Mission) and the James Roberts Band of Cree Indians (located in La Ronge). In 1950, the two bands amalgamated and became the Lac La Ronge Indian Band, the current legal name.

== Reserves and communities ==
=== Reserves ===
Lac La Ronge Indian Band's land-base consists of eighteen Indian reserves, some containing one of six communities:

- Bittern Lake 218 — 6,886 ha (17,020 acres)
- Four Portages 157C — 0.20 ha (0.49 acres)
- Fox Point 157D — 56.70 ha (140.1 acres)
- Fox Point 157E — 4.20 ha (10.4 acres)
- Grandmother's Bay 219 — 4,488.90 ha (11,092.3 acres) — containing the community of Grandmother's Bay
- Kitsakie 156B — 74 ha (180 acres)
- Lac la Ronge 156 — 605.40 ha (1,496.0 acres) — containing the community of La Ronge
- Little Hills 158 — 517.20 ha (1,278.0 acres)
- Little Hills 158A — 38.30 ha (94.6 acres)
- Little Hills 158B — 131.20 ha (324.2 acres)
- Little Red River 106C — 12,939.30 ha (31,973.7 acres) — containing the community of Little Red River
  - originally 12,302.44 hectares (30,400.0 acres)
  - in 1935, additional 650.69 hectares (1,607.9 acres) reserved
- Little Red River 106D — 2,590 ha (6,400 acres)
- Morin Lake 217 — 14,146.10 ha (34,955.8 acres) — containing the community of Hall Lake
  - originally 13,208.94 hectares (32,640.0 acres)
  - in 1973, additional 936.85 hectares (2,315.0 acres) reserved
- Old Fort 157B — 5.40 ha (13.3 acres)
- Potato River 156A — 409.50 ha (1,011.9 acres)
- Stanley 157 — 251.30 ha (621.0 acres) — containing the community of Stanley Mission
- Stanley 157A — 3.80 ha (9.4 acres)
- Sucker River 156C — 154.80 ha (382.5 acres) — containing the community of Sucker River

The communities of Stanley Mission, Grandmother's Bay and Little Red River are self-administered. This arrangement ensures that these communities have more control over their services and programs.

=== Communities ===
- Lac La Ronge (Cree: ᒥᐢᑕᐦᐃ ᓵᑲᐦᐃᑲᓂᕽ, mistahi-sâkahikanihk) — on Lac La Ronge 156 (55.0707°N 105.2962°W)
- Little Red River (Cree: ᐸᐢᒁᐘᐢᑮᕽ, paskwâwaskîhk) — on Little Red River 106C as well as Montreal Lake Nation's Montreal Lake 106B Reserve (53.52646°N 105.99115°W)
- Hall Lake (Cree: ᒨᓱᓵᑲᐦᐃᑲᓂᓰᓯᕽ, môsosâkahikanisîsihk) — on Morin Lake 217 (55.1120°N 105.9118°W)
- Morin Lake (Cree: ᐚᐸᓂ ᓵᑲᐦᐃᑲᓂᕽ, wâpani-sâkahikanihk) — on Morin Lake 217 (55.08723°N 105.74056°W)
- Sucker River (Cree: ᓇᒦᐱᙾ, namîpith sîpiy) — on Sucker River 156C (55.2841°N 105.1636°W)
- Stanley Mission (Cree: ᐋᒪᒋᐑᐢᐱᒧᐏᓂᕽ, âmaciwîspimowinihk) — on Stanley 157 (55.4106°N 104.5672°W)
- Grandmother's Bay (Cree: ᑯᐦᑯᒥᓈᓂᕽ, kohkominânihk) — on Grandmother's Bay 219 (55.6247°N 104.6959°W)

== Governance ==
The First Nation elects their council under the custom electoral system, consisting of a chief and 12 councillors. The current council consists of Chief Tammy Cook-Searson and councillors, Devin Bernatchez, Jimmy Charles, Linda Charles, John Boy Halkett, Gerald McKenzie, Robin McKenzie, Keith Mirasty, Ann Ratt, Dean Roberts, Sam Roberts, Norman Ross, and Charlene Venne.

== See also ==
- List of First Nations peoples in Canada
- Federation of Sovereign Indigenous Nations
