= La Ronge =

Northern town in Saskatchewan, Canada

- Northern town
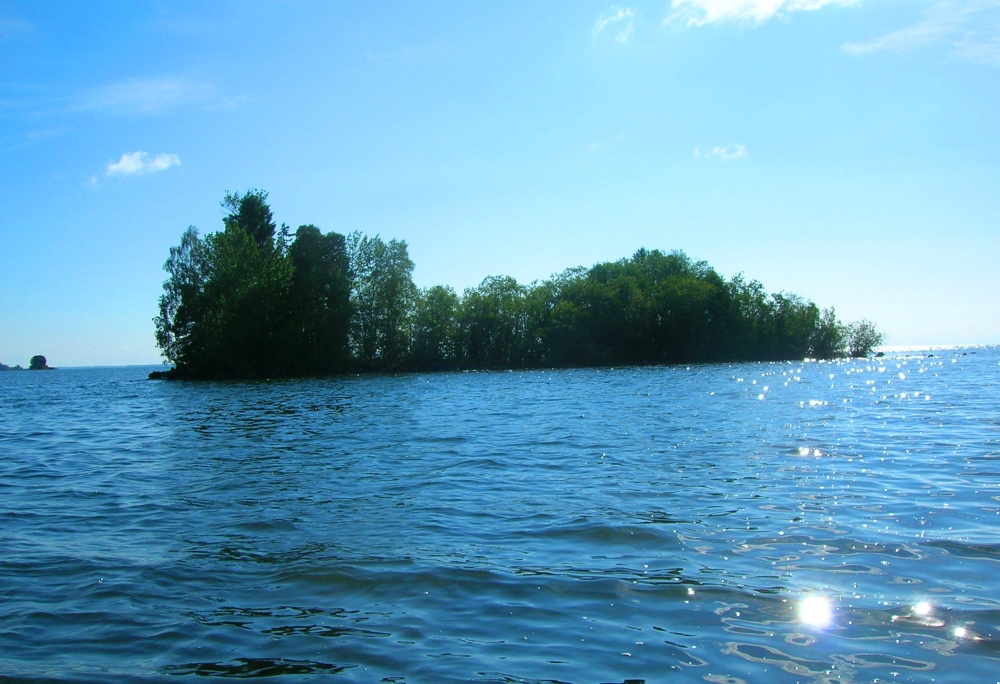
- Island on Lac La Ronge

- Location of La Ronge in Saskatchewan/Canada La Ronge (Canada)
- Coordinates: 55°06′N 105°18′W
- Country: Canada
- Province: Saskatchewan
- District: Northern Saskatchewan Administration District
- Northern village: 3 May 1905
- Industrial town: 1965
- Town: 1 November 1976
- Northern town: 1 October 1983

Government
  - MLA Cumberland: Jordan McPhail
  - MP Desnethé—Missinippi —Churchill River: Buckley Belanger

Area
  - Land: 16.40 km^{2} (6.33 sq mi)
  - Urban: 8.57 km^{2} (3.31 sq mi)

Population (2021)
  - Northern town: 2,521
  - Density: 150.9/km^{2} (391/sq mi)
  - Urban: 5,671
  - Urban density: 661.9/km^{2} (1,714/sq mi)
- Time zone: UTC−6 (CST)
- Postal code: S0J 1L0
- Highways: CanAm Highway / Highway 2 / Highway 102
- Post office established: 1911
- Climate: Dfc
- Website: Official website

La Ronge is a northern town in the boreal forest of Saskatchewan, Canada. The town is also the namesake of the larger La Ronge population centre, the largest in northern Saskatchewan, comprising the Northern Village of Air Ronge, and the Kitsakie 156B and Lac La Ronge 156 reserves of the Lac La Ronge First Nation.

The town is located approximately 250 km (160 mi) north of Prince Albert and lies on the western shore of Lac la Ronge, is adjacent to Lac La Ronge Provincial Park, and is on the edge of the Canadian Shield.

== History ==
The name "La Ronge" comes from the lake itself, although the actual origin of the name is uncertain. The French verb ronger translates as "to gnaw", with at least one explanation theorising that 17th- and 18th-century French fur traders referred to the lake as la ronge (literally, the chewed) due to the abundant beaver population along the lake’s shoreline. Undoubtedly, many of the trees along the water’s edge would have been visibly chewed, or completely gnawed to the ground and taken away by the rodents for their dam construction.

In 1782, Swiss born fur trader Jean-Étienne Waddens had a fur trade post on Lac La Ronge. In March 1782, Waddens was fatally wounded in a quarrel with his associate Peter Pond.

La Ronge began in 1904 as a fur trading post and meeting place, but with the decline of hunting and the fur market, La Ronge has diversified into other areas. Many of the Dene, Cree, and white trappers used La Ronge as their central service point. It incorporated as a northern village on 3 May 1905.

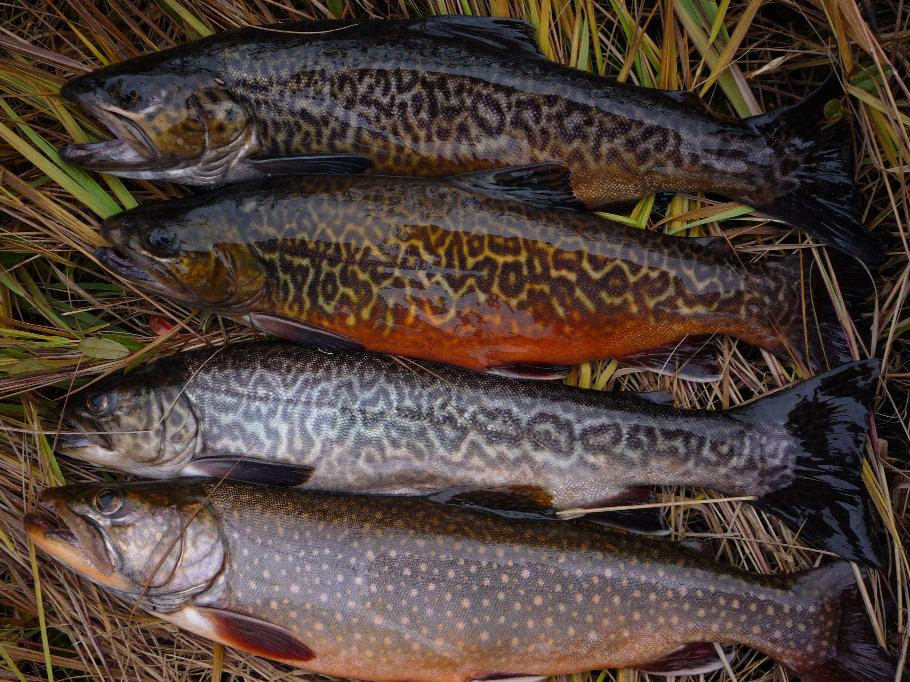
Sport fishing in Lac la Ronge

With the extension of Highway 2 from Prince Albert in 1947, La Ronge became a major tourist fishing area. The highway between La Ronge and Prince Albert expanded the community further in the 1970s after it was paved.

In the early 1950s and 1960s, the mineral resources in the La Ronge area began to be explored and developed.

La Ronge's status changed from northern village to industrial town in 1965 and then to town on 1 November 1976 before finally becoming a northern town on 1 October 1983.

=== Wildfire evacuations ===
In May 1999, the community of La Ronge was evacuated after a fire burned through the far north of the town. The wildfire burned multiple houses before conditions pushed the fire away from the town and crews were able to extinguish it.

Once again in July 2015, La Ronge was threatened by dangerous forest fires that combined forcing approximately 7,000 people to evacuate from their homes. Many cabins and homes were burnt. The fire came within 2 km of La Ronge and burned completely around the La Ronge Airport making it difficult to fight the fire from air with smokey conditions and unreliable weather making the fight against the fires very difficult. In total there were over a hundred fires burning in Northern Saskatchewan at once which forced over 13,000 residents to flee their homes, resulting in the province's largest evacuation ever. The fires were caused by low precipitation in the winter and summer months and also high temperatures.

== Geography ==
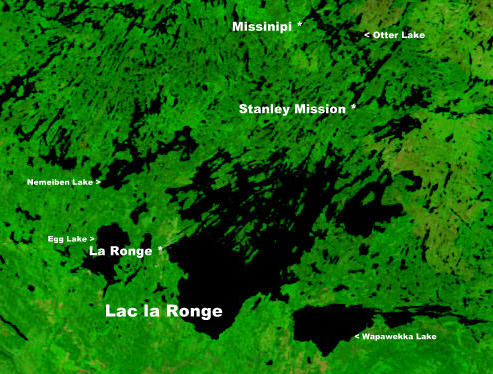
Location of La Ronge on Lac la Ronge

La Ronge is surrounded by several First Nations reserves, with the Northern Village of Air Ronge located just south of the community on Highway 2. With access to all other points north, east and west, and transportation linkage to the south, La Ronge is also the northern hub for the Saskatchewan provincial government.

=== Climate ===
According to the Köppen–Geiger and Trewartha climate classification systems, La Ronge experiences a borderline (warm-summer) humid continental climate (Köppen Dfb; Trewartha Dc)—prior to the 1991–2020 normals, it experienced a continental subarctic climate (Köppen Dfc; Trewartha Ec). Winters are long, dry and very cold while summer is short, warm and wetter. Precipitation is fairly low, with an annual average of 513.6 millimetres (20.22 in). The highest temperature ever recorded in La Ronge was 37.2 °C (99.0 °F) on 23 August 1929, while the coldest temperature ever recorded was −52.2 °C (−62.0 °F) on 15 February 1936.

Climate data for La Ronge Airport, 1991–2020 temperature and precipitation, 1981–2010 rainfall and snowfall, extremes 1923–present
Month	Jan	Feb	Mar	Apr	May	Jun	Jul	Aug	Sep	Oct	Nov	Dec	Year
Record high °C (°F)	12.5 (54.5)	14.0 (57.2)	17.5 (63.5)	28.0 (82.4)	33.2 (91.8)	36.1 (97.0)	35.6 (96.1)	37.2 (99.0)	34.4 (93.9)	27.4 (81.3)	18.0 (64.4)	10.6 (51.1)	37.2 (99.0)
Mean daily maximum °C (°F)	−13.3 (8.1)	−9.6 (14.7)	−1.9 (28.6)	7.2 (45.0)	15.0 (59.0)	20.5 (68.9)	23.5 (74.3)	22.1 (71.8)	15.6 (60.1)	6.7 (44.1)	−3.6 (25.5)	−11.4 (11.5)	5.9 (42.6)
Daily mean °C (°F)	−18.3 (−0.9)	−15.6 (3.9)	−8.4 (16.9)	0.9 (33.6)	8.3 (46.9)	14.6 (58.3)	17.6 (63.7)	16.3 (61.3)	10.2 (50.4)	2.5 (36.5)	−7.5 (18.5)	−16.0 (3.2)	0.4 (32.7)
Mean daily minimum °C (°F)	−23.3 (−9.9)	−21.6 (−6.9)	−14.9 (5.2)	−5.4 (22.3)	1.6 (34.9)	8.6 (47.5)	11.6 (52.9)	10.4 (50.7)	4.7 (40.5)	−1.7 (28.9)	−11.3 (11.7)	−20.5 (−4.9)	−5.1 (22.7)
Record low °C (°F)	−48.3 (−54.9)	−52.2 (−62.0)	−41.8 (−43.2)	−33.9 (−29.0)	−17.6 (0.3)	−3.3 (26.1)	0.0 (32.0)	−3.4 (25.9)	−9.4 (15.1)	−20.9 (−5.6)	−37.6 (−35.7)	−48.9 (−56.0)	−52.2 (−62.0)
Average precipitation mm (inches)	22.3 (0.88)	18.5 (0.73)	25.0 (0.98)	34.0 (1.34)	40.9 (1.61)	69.3 (2.73)	89.1 (3.51)	65.3 (2.57)	57.3 (2.26)	41.3 (1.63)	26.9 (1.06)	23.6 (0.93)	513.5 (20.23)
Average rainfall mm (inches)	0.2 (0.01)	0.3 (0.01)	1.6 (0.06)	16.9 (0.67)	38.6 (1.52)	66.5 (2.62)	80.5 (3.17)	60.6 (2.39)	55.1 (2.17)	20.7 (0.81)	2.4 (0.09)	0.3 (0.01)	343.6 (13.53)
Average snowfall cm (inches)	20.4 (8.0)	17.3 (6.8)	21.0 (8.3)	19.2 (7.6)	5.2 (2.0)	0.1 (0.0)	0.0 (0.0)	0.0 (0.0)	0.9 (0.4)	16.7 (6.6)	28.3 (11.1)	25.0 (9.8)	154.1 (60.7)
Source 1: Environment and Climate Change Canada (1991−2020 temperature and precipitation normals)
Source 2: Environment Canada (1981−2010 rainfall and snowfall normals, and some extremes)

== Demographics ==
In the 2021 Census of Population conducted by Statistics Canada, La Ronge had a population of 2,521 living in 915 of its 1,034 total private dwellings, a change of −6.2% from its 2016 population of 2,688. With a land area of 16.71 km^{2} (6.45 sq mi), it had a population density of 150.9/km^{2} (390.7/sq mi) in 2021.

Canada census – La Ronge community profile

	2021	2011
Population	2,521 (-6.2% from 2016)	2,743 (0.7% from 2006)
Land area	16.71 km^{2} (6.45 sq mi)	11.86 km^{2} (4.58 sq mi)
Population density	150.9/km^{2} (391/sq mi)	231.3/km^{2} (599/sq mi)
Median age	31.0 (M: 30.0, F: 32.0)	30.2 (M: 30.1, F: 30.3)
Private dwellings	1,034 (total) 915 (occupied)	1,170 (total)
Median household income	$93,000

References: 2021 2011

=== Population centre ===
The La Ronge population centre, the fourteenth largest population centre in the province, comprises four adjoining census subdivisions including the Northern Town of La Ronge, the Northern Village of Air Ronge and the Kitsakie 156B and Lac La Ronge 156 Indian reserves of the Lac La Ronge First Nation.

In the 2016 Census, Statistics Canada reported that the La Ronge population centre had a population of 5,671 living in 1,704 of its 1,927 total dwellings, a +6.6% change from its 2011 population of 5,318. With a land area of 8.57 km^{2} (3.31 sq mi), it had a population density of 661.7/km^{2} (1,713.9/sq mi) in 2016.

The following is a population breakdown of the La Ronge population centre by census subdivision.

Census subdivision	2016 population	2011 population	2006 population
Air Ronge	1,106	1,043	1,032
Kitsakie 156B	605	644	671
La Ronge	2,688	2,304	2,725
Lac La Ronge 156	2,017	1,914	1,534
Total La Ronge population centre	6,416	5,905	5,962

== Economy ==
Several mining companies, government agencies, and airlines now keep offices in La Ronge, and the local Chamber of Commerce has many other retail and service businesses amongst its members.

La Ronge Wild Rice Corporation processes freshly harvested wild rice (in August to October) from Northern Saskatchewan farmers.

Tourism also brings in many of people to the La Ronge area. In the summer time, many people visit the Lac La Ronge Provincial Park which is Saskatchewan's largest Provincial Park.

== Sports ==
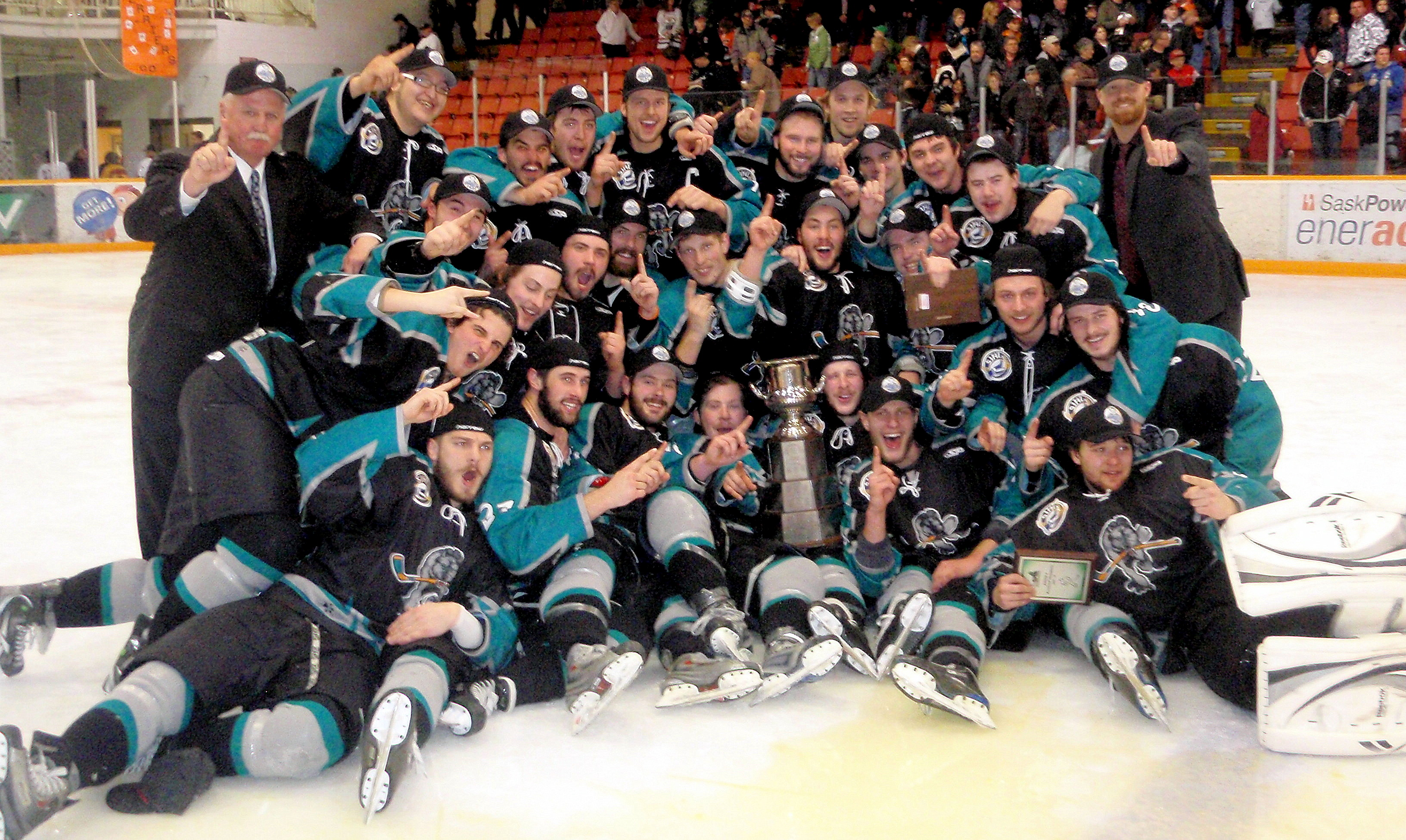
La Ronge Ice Wolves in 2010

The community is also home to the La Ronge Ice Wolves ice hockey team of the Saskatchewan Junior Hockey League, La Ronge minor hockey association and the La Ronge Crushers men's hockey league and the La Ronge women's hockey league. La Ronge also has a minor baseball program with many teams and age groups.

La Ronge is home to an 8 team Ladies Slopitch League - JRMCC Ladies Slopitch (slow-pitch softball). The Churchill Community High School and the Senator Myles Venne High School both have many sports programs and partake in the Saskatchewan High School Athletic Association. There are many other sports available in the community including volleyball, broomball, curling and a women's hockey program.

== Government ==
The municipality is governed by the La Ronge Town Council consisting of the mayor and six councillors.

== Education ==
There are two high schools and three elementary schools in La Ronge and Air Ronge. High schools include Churchill Community High School and / Senator Myles Venne High School. Elementary schools in La Ronge and Air Ronge include Pre-cam Community School, Gordon Denny Community School, and Bells Point Elementary School.

Northlands College maintains its main campus in La Ronge and took over the Nortep / Norpac program after the Saskatchewan provincial government cut funding to the program in March 2017.

== Transportation ==
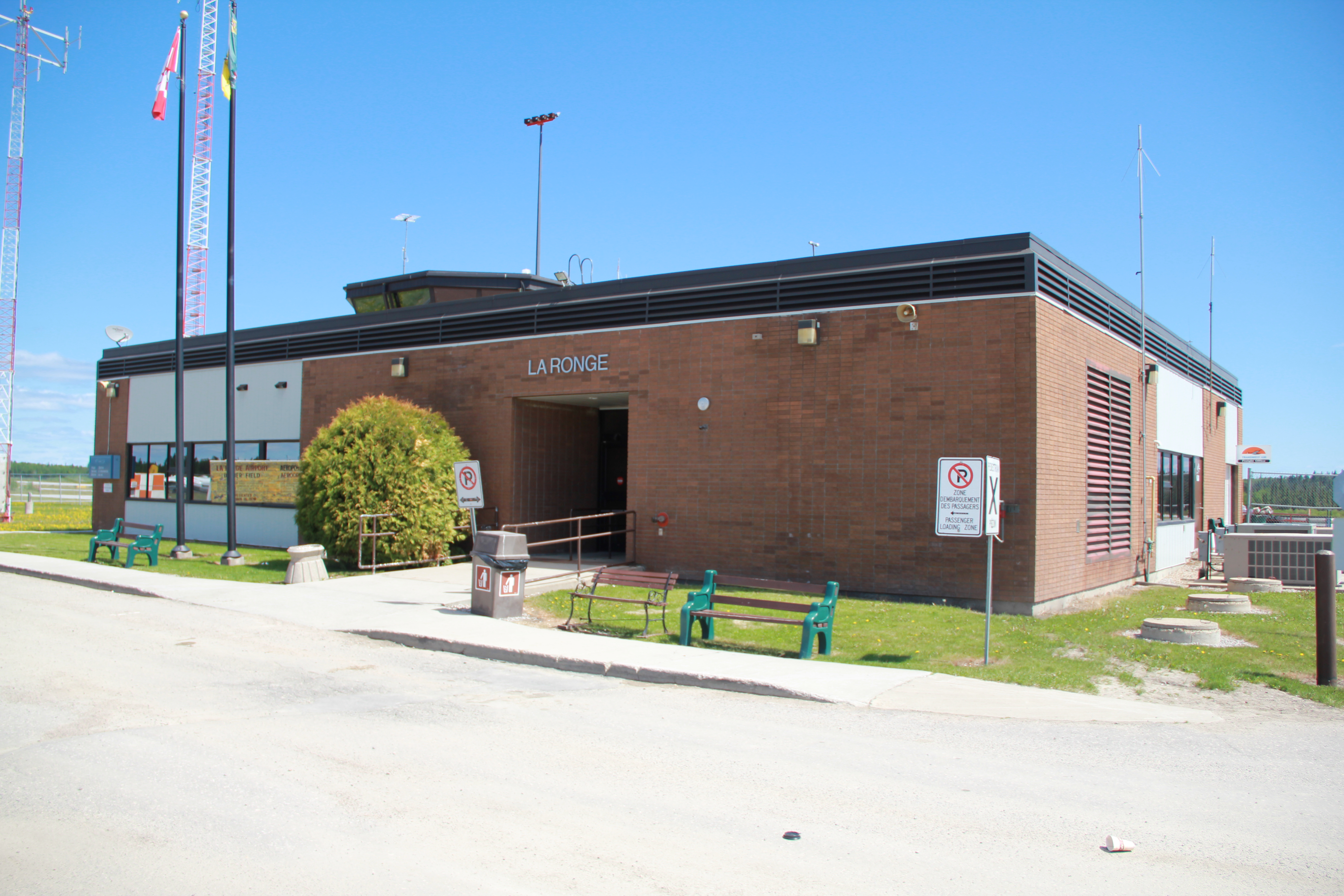
La Ronge (Barber Field) Airport

La Ronge is connected to southern Saskatchewan by Highway 2, which continues north as Highway 102. La Ronge is served by the La Ronge (Barber Field) Airport and the La Ronge Water Aerodrome.

== Notable people ==
- Danis Goulet, Cree-Métis film director and screenwriter

== See also ==
- List of towns in Saskatchewan
- List of communities in Saskatchewan
- List of Indian reserves in Saskatchewan
