= Wasawakasik Lake =

Lake in Saskatchewan, Canada

- Location in Saskatchewan Wasawakasik Lake (Canada)
- Location: Northern Administration District, Saskatchewan
- Coordinates: 55.5747°N 102.2429°W
- Part of: Churchill River drainage basin
- Primary inflows: Churchill River; Nemei River
- Primary outflows: Churchill River
- Basin countries: Canada
- Surface area: 1,815 ha (4,480 acres)
- Shore length^{1}: 106 km (66 mi)
- Surface elevation: 308 m (1,010 ft)
- Islands: Davis Island; Smailes Island
- Settlements: Sandy Bay
- ^{1} Shore length is not a well-defined measure.

Wasawakasik Lake is a lake in the Canadian province of Saskatchewan. It is about 91 kilometres (57 mi) north-northwest of Creighton along the course of the Churchill River. The northern village of Sandy Bay is the only community on the lake. The lake lies in low-relief forested terrain of the Canadian Shield. The climate is sub-arctic.

== Description ==
Wasawakasik Lake consists of two arms — a north–south one and an east–west one that curves to the north-east. The lake's shore length is about 106 kilometres (66 mi) long, while its surface area covers 1,815 hectares (4,480 acres). The mean annual flow volume of the Churchill River at Sandy Bay is 21,620,000 dam^{3} (17,530,000 acre⋅ft).

The two primary inflows for Wasawakasik Lake are the Churchill and Nemei Rivers. The Churchill River begins at Churchill Lake in north-western Saskatchewan and is largely a series of interconnecting lakes. It flows into Wasawakasik Lake's north-western end from Sokatisewin Lake through the Island Falls Dam. The dam, built in 1930, regulates the flow of water into the lake and is the site of Island Falls Hydroelectric Station, which was the first hydroelectric station in Saskatchewan. Nemei River flows into Wasawakasik Lake at southern end of the north–south arm. Its source is to the south at Nemei Lake. The river's headwaters include several notable lakes, including Kakinagimak Lake. Kakinagimak Lake is a bifurcating lake that flows north into the Churchill River and south into the Saskatchewan River drainage basin.

The Churchill River flows out of Wasawakasik Lake at the eastern end of the east–west arm, around Smailes Island, and then into Okipwatsikew Lake. The river's main channel flows north of the island while Stewart Channel runs to the south.

== Communities ==
The northern village of Sandy Bay and the Indian reserve of Wapaskokimaw 202 are on the eastern shore of the southern arm of the lake. Sandy Bay Airport is a short distance east of Sandy Bay on the southern shore of the east–west arm. The former community of Island Falls is on the man-made Davis Island at the point where Churchill River enters the lake. Access to the lake, its communities, and the hydroelectric power station is from Highway 135.

== Fish species ==
Fish species commonly found in Wasawakasik Lake include lake Sturgeon, walleye, goldeye, northern pike, cisco, lake whitefish, burbot, and yellow perch.

== See also ==
- List of lakes of Saskatchewan
