= Attitti Lake =

Lake in Saskatchewan, Canada

- Location in Saskatchewan Attitti Lake (Canada)

- Attitti (centre) and surrounding lakes
- Location: Northern Administration District, Saskatchewan
- Coordinates: 55°07′N 102°27′W
- Etymology: Cree for "tanned hide"
- Part of: Saskatchewan River drainage basin
- River sources: Canadian Shield
- Basin countries: Canada
- Surface area: 2,758 ha (6,820 acres)
- Max. depth: 48 m (157 ft)
- Shore length^{1}: 172 km (107 mi)
- Surface elevation: 352 m (1,155 ft)
- Settlements: none
- ^{1} Shore length is not a well-defined measure.

Attitti Lake is a lake in the Canadian province of Saskatchewan. It lies in low-relief forested terrain of the Canadian Shield within the Sturgeon-Weir River watershed. The climate is sub-arctic. Attitti is Cree for "tanned hide".

Attitti Lake is at an elevation of 352 metres (1,155 ft). It is northwest of Flin Flon, Manitoba and about 48 kilometres (30 mi) east of Pelican Narrows, Saskatchewan. It is connected by a winter road with Kakinagimak Lake, Wildnest Lake, and Hanson Lake via Highway 106, which runs 4.5 kilometres (2.8 mi) south of Wildnest Lake.

It can be reached by canoe from Pelican Narrows via Mirond Lake's Wunehikun Bay and Waskwei Lake, and is connected to most of the surrounding lakes by well-maintained portages. Deer Horn Lodge, a fly-in fishing lodge, is located at the lake.

== Terrain ==
The area is typical of the flat-surfaced part of the Canadian Shield, with low hills that rarely rise as much as 30 to 46 metres (100 to 150 ft) above the lakes. The terrain consists of roughly parallel sinuous ridges of outcrop separated by muskeg, drift and lakes. The channel that connects Attitti Bay with Attitti Lake is underlain by a north-trending fault zone. Geologically the area is in the Precambrian Kisseynew complex, underlain by an assemblage of metamorphosed sedimentary rocks that has been intricately folded, with intrusions of sill-like granitic bodies. Metamorphism in the area appears to have peaked about 1807 million years ago. There is significant economic potential for volcanogenic massive sulfide and gold mineralization.

The area has parts of three different drainage basins. Robbestad Lake, McArthur Lake, and the northern part of Kakinagimak Lake drain northward into the Churchill River via the Nemei River. The southern part of Kakinagimak Lake, and Dezort Lake, Dougherty Lake, Wildnest Lake, and Pearson Lake drain south into the Wildnest-Sturgeon-Weir River System, then into the Saskatchewan River. The rest of the area, including Belcher Lake, drains into Attitti Lake, which drains eastward through Waskwei Lake, Wunehikun Bay, Mirond Lake and the Sturgeon-Weir River System into the Saskatchewan River system.

== Environment ==
The lake is in the subarctic climate zone. The annual average temperature is −2 °C (28 °F). The warmest month is July, when the average temperature is 16 °C (61 °F) and the coldest is January, with −22 °C (−8 °F). The lake is surrounded by coniferous forest. The trees are mainly black spruce (Picea mariana), jack pine (Pinus banksiana), poplar (populus), and scattered balsam (populus balsamifera). Trees average more than 6.1 metres (20 ft) in height. There are small patches of moss-covered muskeg that support laurel (kalmia microphylla), labrador tea, and scattered larch, and black spruce.

== Fish species ==
Fish commonly found in Attitti Lake include walleye, lake trout, northern pike, white sucker, burbot, lake whitefish, and yellow perch.

== See also ==
- List of lakes of Saskatchewan
