= McArthur Lake (Saskatchewan) =

Lake in Saskatchewan, Canada

- Location in Saskatchewan McArthur Lake (Canada)

- McArthur, Nemei, and Tocher lakes drain into the Nemei River
- Location: Northern Administration District, Saskatchewan
- Coordinates: 55.2501°N 102.4004°W
- Type: Glacial lake
- Etymology: Duncan Archibald McArthur
- Part of: Churchill River drainage basin
- River sources: Canadian Shield
- Primary outflows: Nemei River
- Basin countries: Canada
- Surface area: 788 ha (1,950 acres)
- Shore length^{1}: 42 km (26 mi)
- Surface elevation: 328 m (1,076 ft)
- Islands: Charbonneau Island
- Settlements: None
- ^{1} Shore length is not a well-defined measure.

McArthur Lake is a lake in the Canadian province of Saskatchewan. It lies in low-relief terrain of the Canadian Shield about 63 kilometres (39 mi) north-northwest of Creighton. The climate is sub-arctic. The land is mostly covered by conifer forests, with some areas of muskeg and rocky outcrops.

McArthur Lake is at an elevation of 328 metres (1,076 ft). The lake contains Charbonneau Island. It is northwest of Flin Flon, Manitoba, and east of Pelican Narrows, Saskatchewan. McArthur Lake drains northward into the Churchill River via the Nemei River. The lake is named in honour of Duncan Archibald McArthur, a private soldier who died on 28 August 1944 during the Allied invasion of Normandy.

== Terrain ==
McArthur Lake (centre) and surrounding lakes

The Attitti Lake region, which includes McArthur Lake, is typical of the flat-surfaced part of the Canadian Shield, with low hills that rarely rise as much as 100 to 150 feet (30 to 46 m) above the lakes. The terrain consists of roughly parallel sinuous ridges of outcrop separated by muskeg, drift and lakes. Geologically the area is in the Precambrian Kisseynew complex, underlain by an assemblage of metamorphosed sedimentary rocks that has been intricately folded, with intrusions of sill-like granitic bodies.

In its northern section the McArthur Lake fault zone is parallel to the east shore of McArthur Lake, forming a steep scarp 75 to 100 feet (23 to 30 m) high. The fault zone runs south to a location about 1 mile (1.6 km) north of Galbraith Lake. The Galbraith Lake folds is an open asymmetric overturned syncline with an axial plane trending 25° NE, dipping very sharply to the east, that extends south from the south end of McArthur Lake to the south of Galbraith Lake. There are a number of northerly plunging folds between McArthur and Kakinagimak Lakes with axial planes 20° NE, dipping sharply to the east.

== Environment ==
The lake is in the subarctic climate zone. The annual average temperature is −2 °C (28 °F). The warmest month is July, when the average temperature is 16 °C (61 °F) and the coldest is January, with −29 °C (−20 °F). The lake is surrounded by coniferous forest. The trees are mainly black spruce (Picea mariana), jack pine (Pinus banksiana), poplar (populus) and scattered balsam (populus balsamifera). Trees average more than 20 feet (6.1 m) in height. There are small patches of moss-covered muskeg that support laurel (kalmia microphylla), labrador tea, and scattered larch and black spruce.

Animals hunted for meat or fur include moose, woodland caribou, black bear, beaver, otter, and muskrat. Spruce partridge are common.

== Minerals ==
Dark grey to black garnet-hornblende gneiss is exposed in an area from north of Bentz Bay to just south of McArthur Lake.

Small areas of hornblende and/or biotite migmatite are found near the lake. The light to dark gray outcrops are usually rounded and weathered.

Dykes, lenses, and veins of pegmatite are abundant in the meta-sedimentary rocks and granitic bodies between the north of Attitti Lake and McArthur Lake. The northeast shore of Charbonneau Island has chalcopyrite and pyrite associated with stringers of pink pegmatite in biotite-hornblende migmatite. In 1958 the Hudson Bay Exploration and Development Company staked claims to this area based on an aerial electromagnetic and magnetometer survey. The company undertook a geophysical survey and some diamond drilling, then allowed the claims to lapse.

== See also ==
- List of lakes of Saskatchewan

== Sources ==
- "Dataset Index", NASA Earth Observations Data, NASA, archived from the original on 26 October 2021
- "Duncan Archibald McArthur", Canadian Virtual War Memorial, Veterans Affairs Canada
- Gazetteer of Canada: Saskatchewan (PDF) (4 ed.), Ottawa: Natural Resources Canada, 1998, ISBN 978-1-100-54786-2
- "Land Cover Classification (1 year)", NASA Earth Observations Data, NASA, archived from the original on 26 October 2021
- Peel, M C; Finlayson, B L; McMahon, T A (2007), "Updated world map of the Köppen-Geiger climate classification", Hydrology and Earth System Sciences 11, doi:10.5194/hess-11-1633-2007
- Pyke, M. W. (1961), The Geology of the Attitti Lake Area (West Half) Saskatchewan (PDF), Saskatchewan Department of Mineral Resources, archived from the original (PDF) on 9 November 2018
