= Saskatchewan Highway 135 =

Provincial highway in Saskatchewan, Canada

Highway 135

Route information
- Maintained by Ministry of Highways and Infrastructure
- Length: 120.5 km (74.9 mi)

Major junctions
- South end: Highway 106 near Jan Lake
- North end: Sandy Bay

Location
- Country: Canada
- Province: Saskatchewan

Highway system
- Provincial highways in Saskatchewan
← Highway 123	→ Highway 155

Highway 135 is a provincial highway in the Canadian province of Saskatchewan. It runs from Highway 106 near Jan Lake to Sandy Bay. It is about 121 kilometres (75 mi) long.

== Route description ==
Highway 135 connects with the Jan Lake Access Road near the Jan Lake Recreation Site, about 7 kilometres (4.3 mi) north of Highway 106. It runs north towards Mirond Lake and then follows the western shore northward. At Mirond Lake's southern end, the highway provides access to Bayview Lodge, Silence of the North, and Newmart Fishing Resort.

As the highway nears the northern end of Mirond Lake, it crosses the Opawikusehikan Narrows that Mirond and Pelican Lakes. North of the narrows, the highway passes through the community of Pelican Narrows within the Peter Ballantyne Cree Nation. From there it runs north-east, provides access to Sokatisewin Lake, crosses the Nemei River, and then turns north to Sandy Bay on Wasawakasik Lake. Sokatisewin and Wasawakasik Lakes are along the course of the Churchill River. The highway also provides access to the Island Falls Hydroelectric Station.

== Major intersections ==
From south to north:

Rural municipality	Location	km	mi	Destinations	Notes
Northern Saskatchewan Administration District		0.0	0.0	Highway 106 (Hanson Lake Road) – La Ronge, Prince Albert, Creighton, Flin Flon	Southern terminus
Northern Saskatchewan Administration District		0.8	0.50	– Jan Lake Airport	Access road into airport
Northern Saskatchewan Administration District	Jan Lake Recreation Site	7.1	4.4	Jan Lake access road	
Northern Saskatchewan Administration District	Pelican Narrows 184B	45.3– 45.5	28.1– 28.3	Bridge over the Opawikusehikan Narrows	
Northern Saskatchewan Administration District	Pelican Narrows	50.2	31.2	Bear Street / McKinley Street	Hwy 135 makes a sharp right
Northern Saskatchewan Administration District		71.9	44.7	– Pelican Narrows Airport	Access road into airport
Northern Saskatchewan Administration District		94.1	58.5	Bridge over the Mukoman River	
Northern Saskatchewan Administration District		109.1	67.8	Bridge over the Nemei River	
Northern Saskatchewan Administration District	Sandy Bay	120.5	74.9	Sandy Bay Avenue / Church Street	Northern terminus
1.000 mi = 1.609 km; 1.000 km = 0.621 mi

== See also ==
- Transportation in Saskatchewan
- Roads in Saskatchewan
