= Pelican Narrows =

Pelican Narrows may refer to:

- Pelican Narrows, Alberta, village in Alberta, Canada
- Pelican Narrows, Saskatchewan, village in Saskatchewan, Canada
- Pelican Narrows Airport, airport in Saskatchewan
- Pelican Narrows (Saskatchewan), a strait connecting Pelican Lake and Mirond Lake in Saskatchewan
