= Meridian Lake =

Lake in Saskatchewan, Canada

- Location in Saskatchewan Meridian Lake (Canada)
- Location: Northern Administration District, Saskatchewan
- Coordinates: 54.7525°N 102.000°W
- Etymology: 102nd meridian
- Part of: Saskatchewan River drainage basin
- River sources: Canadian Shield
- Primary outflows: Meridian Creek
- Basin countries: Canada
- Surface area: 125 ha (310 acres)
- Max. depth: 6.2 m (20 ft)
- Shore length^{1}: 13 km (8.1 mi)
- Settlements: None
- ^{1} Shore length is not a well-defined measure.

Meridian Lake is a small lake in Saskatchewan, Canada. It is 5.6 kilometres (3.5 mi) west of Creighton in the Northern Administration District. The 102nd meridian passes through the western end of the lake. Access is from Highway 167.

Meridian Lake is in the Canadian Shield and has a subarctic climate. It is a narrow lake that covers an area of 125 hectares (310 acres), has a shoreline measuring 13 kilometres (8.1 mi), and is 6.2 metres (20 ft) deep. It is the source of Meridian Creek, which flows south into Amisk Lake.

Fish commonly found in Meridian Lake include walleye, northern pike, and yellow perch.

== See also ==
- List of lakes of Saskatchewan
