= Wildnest Lake =

Lake in Saskatchewan, Canada

- Location in Saskatchewan Wildnest Lake (Canada)

- Wildnest Lake (bottom right) and surrounding lakes
- Location: Northern Administration District, Saskatchewan
- Coordinates: 55.0059°N 102.2905°W
- Type: Glacial lake
- Part of: Saskatchewan River drainage basin
- River sources: Canadian Shield
- Primary outflows: Wildnest River
- Basin countries: Canada
- Surface area: 4,543 ha (11,230 acres)
- Max. depth: 32.8 m (108 ft)
- Shore length^{1}: 278 km (173 mi)
- Surface elevation: 351 m (1,152 ft)
- Islands: Fisher Island; Reid Island
- Settlements: None
- ^{1} Shore length is not a well-defined measure.

Wildnest Lake is a large glacial lake in the Canadian province of Saskatchewan. It is an irregularly shaped lake about 37 kilometres (23 mi) north-west of Creighton in the Northern Saskatchewan Administration District. The lake is situated in the boreal forest ecozone of the Canadian Shield. Wildnest Lake is the source of the Wildnest River, which is a tributary of the Sturgeon-Weir River.

There are no communities on the lake and no highway access. The closest highway is the Hanson Lake Road, which runs 4.5 kilometres (2.8 mi) south of the lake. Wildnest Lake is connected via winter roads to Kakinagimak Lake and Attitti Lake.

== Description ==
Wildnest Lake lies in low-relief forested terrain of the Canadian Shield. The climate is sub-arctic. There are many rivers and lakes within its catchment, including the bifurcating Kakinagimak Lake. Its outflow — the Wildnest River — travels generally south-west through Granite Lake to the Sturgeon-Weir River.

Back spruce, jack pine, and poplar trees are the most abundant around the lake. Balsam is "erratically distributed" in the area. Moose, woodland caribou, black bears, beaver, otters, and muskrats are found in the forest around Wildnest Lake.

Several features of the lake were named as part of the Geomemorial Naming Program, which honours soldiers who lost their lives in the service of Saskatchewan and Canada. Ried Island was named after William John Reid, Roberts Bay was named after Maurice Luther Roberts, Manson Bay was named after Merlin Joseph Manson, and Schmidt Bay was named after Walter Bernhardt Schmidt.

== Fish species ==
Fish species commonly found in Wildnest Lake include walleye, lake trout, northern pike, cisco, lake whitefish, burbot, white sucker, and yellow perch.

== See also ==
- List of lakes of Saskatchewan
