= Jan Lake (Saskatchewan) =

Lake in Saskatchewan, Canada

- Location in Saskatchewan Jan Lake (Canada)

- Jan Lake (bottom left)
- Location: Northern Administration District, Saskatchewan
- Coordinates: 54.9334°N 102.9171°W
- Part of: Saskatchewan River drainage basin
- Primary outflows: Pelican Lake
- Basin countries: Canada
- Surface area: 11,567.1 ha (28,583 acres)
- Max. depth: 16.6 m (54 ft)
- Shore length^{1}: 403.3 km (250.6 mi)
- Surface elevation: 313 m (1,027 ft)
- Islands: James Island; Harper Island; Busteed Island
- Settlements: Jan Lake
- ^{1} Shore length is not a well-defined measure.

Jan Lake is a lake in the Northern Administration District of the Canadian Province of Saskatchewan. It is situated in the boreal forest of Canada. The lake is "named after Arthur Jan of Pelican Narrows who was a pioneer northern businessman/trader, and a justice of the peace from 1921". Several small lakes and rivers flow into Jan Lake while its outflow is on the west side through a glacier-carved channel into Pelican Lake. The lake is within the Sturgeon-Weir River drainage basin. The Sturgeon-Weir River is a tributary of the Saskatchewan River.

Jan Lake is the only community on the lake. It is at the south-eastern corner and is accessed from Highway 135 and Jan Lake Airport. Jan Lake is a recreational community with access to the lake, campgrounds, cabins, and outfitters. The community is surrounded by Jan Lake Recreation Site, which is a provincial recreation site run by Jan Lake Trading Post.

== Fish species ==
Fish commonly found in Jan Lake include walleye, yellow perch, burbot, and northern pike.

== See also ==
- List of lakes of Saskatchewan
- Tourism in Saskatchewan
