= Phelan Lake =

Lake in Saskatchewan, Canada

- Location in Saskatchewan Phelan Lake (Canada)

- Phelan Lake (centre right) and surrounding lakes
- Location: Northern Administration District, Saskatchewan
- Coordinates: 55.2641°N 102.1521°W
- Type: Glacial lake
- Part of: Churchill River drainage basin
- River sources: Canadian Shield
- Primary outflows: MacLean Lake
- Basin countries: Canada
- Max. length: 6.6 km (4.1 mi)
- Max. width: 3.2 km (2.0 mi)
- Surface area: 647.5 ha (1,600 acres)
- Max. depth: 12.2 m (40 ft)
- Shore length^{1}: 35 km (22 mi)
- Settlements: None
- ^{1} Shore length is not a well-defined measure.

Phelan Lake is a glacial lake in the Canadian province of Saskatchewan. The lake is within the Northern Administration District about 57 kilometres (35 mi) north-northwest of Creighton.

Phelan Lake covers an area of 647.5 hectares (1,600 acres), has a shoreline of 35 kilometres (22 mi), and is 6.6 kilometres (4.1 mi) long. Several small rivers flow into the lake while its outflow is a short connection to MacLean Lake. MacLean Lake empties via a short river into Tocher Lake, which is a lake along the course of Nemei River in the Churchill River drainage basin.

There are no communities on the lake — only a fly-in fishing lodge. Northern pike are commonly found in the lake.

== See also ==
- List of lakes of Saskatchewan
