= Saskatchewan Highway 167 =

Provincial highway in Saskatchewan, Canada

Highway 167

Route information
- Maintained by Ministry of Highways and Infrastructure
- Length: 49.4 km (30.7 mi)

Major junctions
- South end: Amiskosakahikan Indian reserve
- Highway 106 in Creighton
- North end: PTH 10 at Manitoba border in Flin Flon

Location
- Country: Canada
- Province: Saskatchewan

Highway system
- Provincial highways in Saskatchewan
| ← Highway 165 | → Highway 201 |

Highway 167 is a provincial highway in Saskatchewan, Canada. It runs from the Manitoba border between Creighton and Flin Flon, where it takes over from Manitoba Highway 10, to the Amiskosakahikan Indian reserve on the southern shore of Amisk Lake. It is about 49 kilometres (30 mi) long.

About two-thirds of Highway 167 lies on the east coast of Amisk Lake. The town of Denare Beach and the recreation sites of Amisk Lake and Meridian Creek are accessible from the highway. The entire route is in Northern Administration District.

Highway 167 was originally signed as part of Highway 35, but was renumbered to its present designation around 1967.

== Route description ==
Highway 167 begins at a dead end along the banks of the Sturgeon-Weir River, just below its mouth on Amisk Lake inside the Amiskosakahikan 210 Indian reserve. It heads north as a gravel road along the eastern coastline of Amisk Lake for several kilometres, travelling past the Amisk Lake Recreation Site through remote woodlands and switchbacks as it leaves the reserve and crosses Meridian Creek at the Meridian Creek Recreation Site on its way to the northern village of Denare Beach, where it becomes paved. The highway passes through neighbourhoods on the eastern side of town along Moody Drive before making a sharp right turn onto Tenth Avenue. Leaving town, it winds its way northeastward for several kilometres through remote terrain past several smaller lakes, including Meridian Lake. Highway 167 enters the town of Creighton along Creighton Avenue and travels through neighbourhoods before junctioning with Highway 106 (Main Street / Hanson Lake Road). Now crossing into the town of Flin Flon, the highway travels along Main Street, having an intersection with Channing Drive near a golf course before passing through a neighbourhood to enter Manitoba, with Main Street continuing north as Manitoba Highway 10 (PTH 10). The entire length of Highway 167 is a two-lane highway, located entirely within the Northern Saskatchewan Administration District.

== Major intersections ==
From south to north:

| Location | km | mi | Destinations | Notes |
|---|---|---|---|---|
| Amiskosakahikan Indian reserve | 0.0 | 0.0 | Dead end at Sturgeon-Weir River | Southern terminus; southern end of unpaved section |
| Denare Beach | 29.7 | 18.5 | Moody Drive / Tenth Avenue | Northern end of unpaved section |
| Creighton | 47.1 | 29.3 | Highway 106 south (Main Street / Hanson Lake Road) – Prince Albert | |
| Flin Flon | 49.4 | 30.7 | PTH 10 south – Flin Flon, The Pas | Continues into Manitoba |
1.000 mi = 1.609 km; 1.000 km = 0.621 mi

== See also ==
- Transportation in Saskatchewan
- Roads in Saskatchewan
