= Granite Lake (Saskatchewan) =

Lake in Saskatchewan, Canada

- Location in Saskatchewan Granite Lake (Canada)

- Granite Lake (centre-bottom) and surrounding lakes
- Location: Northern Administration District, Saskatchewan
- Coordinates: 54.8834°N 102.5338°W
- Part of: Saskatchewan River drainage basin
- Primary inflows: Wildnest River
- Primary outflows: Wildnest River
- Basin countries: Canada
- Surface area: 856 ha (2,120 acres)
- Surface elevation: 308 m (1,010 ft)
- Settlements: None

Granite Lake is a lake in the Canadian province of Saskatchewan. It is situated in the boreal forest in the Churchill River Upland ecozone of Canada. Granite Lake is along the course of the Wildnest River, which drains the much larger Wildnest Lake west into the Sturgeon-Weir River. The Sturgeon-Weir River is a tributary of the Saskatchewan River.

Granite Lake is about 40 kilometres (25 mi) west of Creighton and the border with Manitoba. While there is a provincial campground at the lake, there are no communities along its shore. Access is from Highway 106.

== Granite Lake Recreation Site ==
Granite Lake Recreation Site (54.8638°N 102.5291°W) is a provincial campground on the southern shore of Granite Lake. The park, which is situated in a "natural forest setting", has six rustic campsites, a boat launch, wildlife viewing opportunities, and a picnic area. The boat launch provides access to the lake for fishing, boating, and other water sports.

== See also ==
- List of lakes of Saskatchewan
- Tourism in Saskatchewan
