= Waskwei Lake =

Lake in Saskatchewan, Canada

- Location in Saskatchewan Waskwei Lake (Canada)

- Waskwei Lake between Mirond and Attitti Lakes
- Location: Northern Administration District, Saskatchewan
- Coordinates: 55.1223°N 102.5345°W
- Type: Glacial lake
- Part of: Saskatchewan River drainage basin
- River sources: Canadian Shield
- Basin countries: Canada
- Max. length: 12.9 km (8.0 mi)
- Max. width: 6.5 km (4.0 mi)
- Surface area: 875 ha (2,160 acres)
- Max. depth: 24.4 m (80 ft)
- Shore length^{1}: 59 km (37 mi)
- Settlements: None
- ^{1} Shore length is not a well-defined measure.

Waskwei Lake is a glacial lake in the Canadian province of Saskatchewan. The lake is within the Northern Administration District about 58 kilometres (36 mi) north-west of Creighton. It is surrounded by boreal forest within the Canadian Shield. The climate is sub-arctic. There are no communities on the lake. Kississing Lodge & Outposts and Northern Lights Outfitters both have fly-in only fishing lodges on the lake. Flights depart from Flin Flon, Manitoba.

== Description ==
Waskwei Lake is situated between Attitti Lake to the east and Mirond Lake to the west. Attitti Lake's outflow is a short river that flows west out of Lowe Bay then south into the eastern end of Waskwei Lake. Waskwei Lake's outflow is a river that leaves at the lake's northern shore and flows north-west into Mirond Lake's Wunehikun Bay. Waskwei Lake is within the Sturgeon-Weir River's catchment. The Sturgeon-Weir River is a tributary of the Saskatchewan River.

Back spruce, jack pine, and poplar trees are the most abundant around the lake. Balsam is "erratically distributed" in the area. Moose, woodland caribou, black bears, beaver, otters, and muskrats are found in the forest around Waskwei Lake.

== Fish species ==
Fish species commonly found in Waskwei Lake include walleye, lake trout, northern pike, and lake whitefish.

== See also ==
- List of lakes of Saskatchewan
