= Belcher Lake =

Lake in Saskatchewan, Canada

- Location in Saskatchewan Belcher Lake (Canada)

- Belcher Lake (centre) and surrounding lakes
- Location: Northern Administration District, Saskatchewan
- Coordinates: 55.2667°N 102.5504°W
- Part of: Saskatchewan River drainage basin
- River sources: Canadian Shield
- Basin countries: Canada
- Surface area: 1,787 ha (4,420 acres)
- Max. depth: 66.5 m (218 ft)
- Shore length^{1}: 116 km (72 mi)
- Surface elevation: 355 m (1,165 ft)
- Settlements: None
- ^{1} Shore length is not a well-defined measure.

Belcher Lake is a lake in the Canadian province of Saskatchewan. It is a large, deep, and irregularly shaped lake about 71 kilometres (44 mi) north-west of Creighton in the Northern Saskatchewan Administration District. The lake is situated in the boreal forest ecozone of the Canadian Shield.

Belcher Lake is within the Sturgeon-Weir River watershed, which is within the Saskatchewan River drainage basin. The lake's outflow is a short river that flows from the southern end into the northern end of Attitti Lake. There are no communities on the lake and no highway access.

== Fish species ==
Fish species commonly found in Belcher Lake include lake trout, northern pike, walleye, lake whitefish, and yellow perch. The lake is not stocked.

== See also ==
- List of lakes of Saskatchewan
