= Nistowiak Lake =

Lake in Saskatchewan, Canada

- Location in Saskatchewan Nistowiak Lake (Canada)
- Location: Northern Administration District, Saskatchewan
- Coordinates: 55.4254°N 104.3249°W
- Part of: Churchill River drainage basin
- Primary inflows: Churchill River; Rapid River
- Primary outflows: Churchill River
- Basin countries: Canada
- Surface area: 2,639 ha (6,520 acres)
- Shore length^{1}: 113 km (70 mi)
- Surface elevation: 353 m (1,158 ft)
- Islands: Hall Island; Bowering Island; McCusker Island
- Settlements: None
- ^{1} Shore length is not a well-defined measure.

Nistowiak Lake is a lake along the course of the Churchill River in the Canadian province of Saskatchewan. The Churchill River is largely a series of interconnected lakes that begins at Churchill Lake in north-western Saskatchewan and empties into the Hudson Bay at Churchill, Manitoba. Upstream from Nistowiak Lake is Drope Lake and downstream is Drinking Lake. The lake is partially within Lac La Ronge Provincial Park about 71 kilometres (44 mi) east-northeast of the community of La Ronge and is surrounded by boreal forest in the Canadian Shield. There are two outfitters and an Indian reserve along the lake's shore.

== Description ==
Nistowiak Lake is a large lake along the course of the Churchill River. It covers an area of 2,639 ha (6,520 acres) and has a 113-kilometre (70 mi) long shoreline.

The two main inflows for the lake are the Churchill River, which flows into the western end of the lake from Drope Lake, and the Rapid River, which begins at Lac la Ronge to the south and flows into the southern end of Nistowiak Lake from Iskwatikan Lake. The Nistowiak Falls — one of the highest in Saskatchewan — are along the Rapid River. The Churchill River flows out of Nistowiak Lake at its eastern end over the Potter Rapids and into Drinking Lake. Potter Rapids were previously known as Drinking Falls but were renamed in 1955 in honour of William Duncan Potter. Potter was a Flying Officer (RCAF pilot) of Saskatoon who died on 14 May 1944 during World War II.

Stanley 157A Indian reserve and Jim's Camp are along Nistowiak Lake's southern shore where the Rapid River flows in. Voyageur Lodge is at Potter Rapids where the Churchill River flows out of Nistowiak Lake.

== Fish species ==
Fish species commonly found in Nistowiak Lake include walleye, sauger, northern pike, cisco, white sucker, longnose sucker, lake whitefish, burbot, and yellow perch.

== See also ==
- List of lakes of Saskatchewan
