= Mirond Lake =

Lake in Saskatchewan, Canada

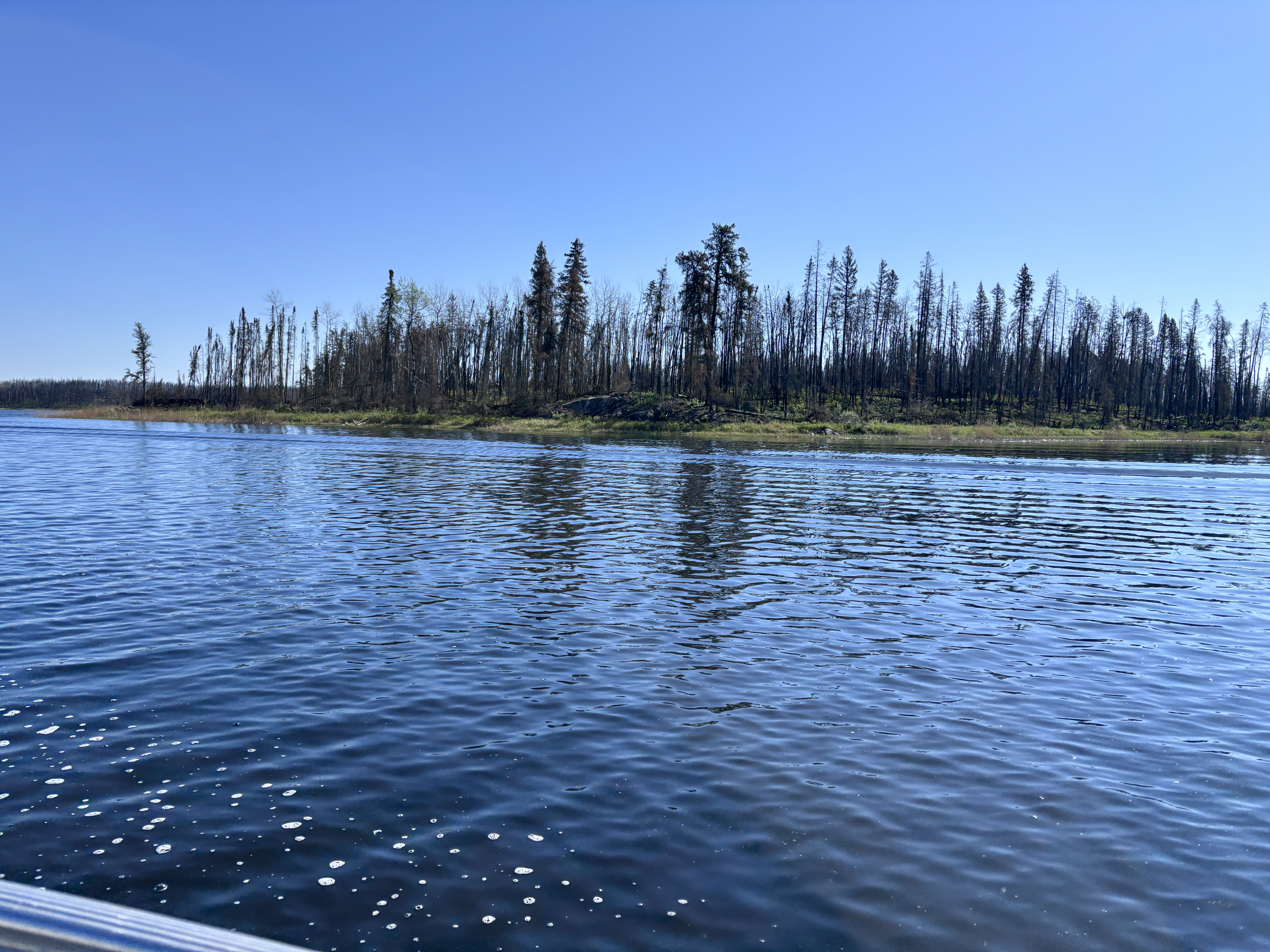
- Mirond Lake

- Location in Saskatchewan Mirond Lake (Canada)

- Mirond (centre) and surrounding lakes
- Location: Northern Administration District, Saskatchewan
- Coordinates: 55.1001°N 102.7837°W
- Etymology: French for "half round" or "half moon"
- Part of: Saskatchewan River drainage basin
- Primary inflows: Opawikusehikan Narrows
- River sources: Canadian Shield
- Primary outflows: Sturgeon-Weir River (via Corneille Lake)
- Basin countries: Canada
- Max. length: 39 km (24 mi)
- Max. width: 8 km (5 mi)
- Surface area: 10,940 ha (27,000 acres)
- Max. depth: 45.5 m (149 ft)
- Shore length^{1}: 489 km (304 mi)
- Surface elevation: 311 m (1,020 ft)
- Settlements: Mirond Lake Indian reserve
- ^{1} Shore length is not a well-defined measure.

Mirond Lake is a lake in Northern Saskatchewan, Canada. The lake lies in low-relief forested terrain of the Canadian Shield about 68 kilometres (42 mi) north-west of Creighton. It is accessible by road from Highway 135, which branches off the Hanson Lake Road. The climate is sub-arctic.

Mirond Lake Indian reserve is near the northern end of Mirond Lake where Wunehikun Bay joins to the lake. There are also lodges with cabins and campgrounds for fishing and hunting at the lake.

== Description ==
Mirond Lake is a large, deep lake. It covers an area of 10,940 hectares (27,000 acres), has a shoreline measuring 489 kilometres (304 mi), and is 45.5 metres (149 ft) deep. It is also about 39 kilometres (24 mi) long and 8 kilometres (5 mi) wide at its widest point.

Mirond Lake is joined to Pelican Lake to the west by Opawikusehikan Narrows. Attitti Lake to the east drains through Waskwei Lake and Wunehikun Bay into Mirond Lake. Pelican and Mirond lakes are near the 400 metres (1,300 ft) high point of the Flin Flon Plain, which slopes gently to the south down to about 330 metres (1,080 ft) at Deschambault Lake and Amisk Lake.

Mirond Lake is the headwaters of the Sturgeon-Weir River, a tributary to Cumberland Lake. This in turn drains into the Saskatchewan River System. The river leaves the south end of Mirond Lake into Corneille Lake through a rock-walled channel containing the Corneille Rapids. It then flows more slowly through a series of long, narrow lakes.

=== Environment ===
The landscape has areas of glaciolacustrine silts and clays or sandy glacial till, with many outcrops of Precambrian rocks that have been scoured by glacial ice. There are large areas of peatland in the poorly drained areas, and elsewhere the land is forested. Black spruce (picea mariana) is common but not dominant, and other trees include white spruce (picea glauca), trembling aspen (populus tremuloides), jack pine (pinus banksiana), and balsam fir (abies balsamea).

== Etymology ==
The name "mi-rond" is French and means "half round", or "half moon" according to Sir John Richardson. It describes the shape of the lake. Peter Pond, a poor speller, showed the lake as "Mineront" in his maps drawn around 1785. Other variants were used later, such as Merion. Sir John Franklin on his overland expedition of 1819–22 wrote "Miron" as "Heron", and this was copied by several other map makers. The name Mirond is standard now. The Cree give the twin lakes of Pelican and Mirond the name Opawikoschikun Sakuhikuna, or "fear lakes", referring to a massacre that took place there around 1730.

== Recreation ==
There are three lodges at Mirond Lake that have services such as outfitting, lodging, and guided fishing and hunting. They include Bayview Lodge, Newmart Fishing Resort, and Silence of the North. All three are at the lake's south-western end with access from Highway 135.

Silence of the North has log cabins, a boat launch, and boat rentals. It also has guided bear hunting and fishing. Newmart Fishing Resort has lake access a convenience store, cabins, and a campground. Bayview Lodge has cabins, a campground, and boat rentals.

== Climate ==
Mirond Lake is in the subarctic climate zone. The annual average temperature is −1 °C (30 °F). The warmest month is July, when the average temperature is 16 °C (61 °F) and the coldest is January, with −24 °C (−11 °F).

== Fish species ==
Fish commonly found in Mirond Lake include walleye, yellow perch, northern pike, cisco, longnose sucker, white sucker, burbot, and lake whitefish.

A Saskatchewan live release record for northern pike was set at Mirond Lake in 2008, with a 141-centimetre (56 in) long specimen.

== See also ==
- List of lakes of Saskatchewan
- Tourism in Saskatchewan
