= Island Falls Hydroelectric Station =

Hydroelectric power station in Saskatchewan, Canada

Island Falls
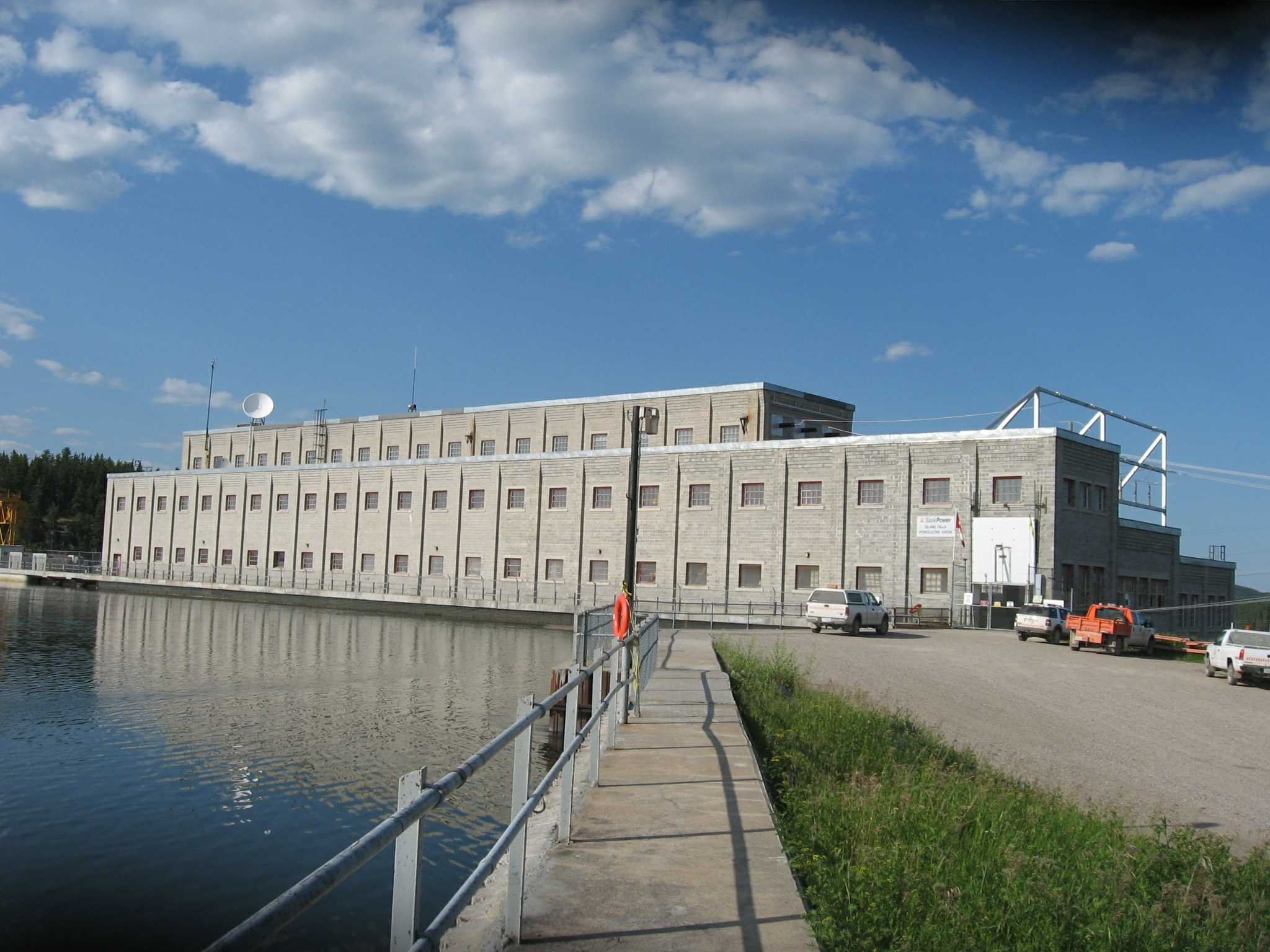
- Island Falls powerhouse

- Location in Saskatchewan Island Falls (Canada)
- Interactive map of Island Falls
- Country: Canada
- Location: Northern Saskatchewan Administration District
- Coordinates: 55°31′44″N 102°21′25″W
- Status: Operational
- Construction began: 1928
- Opening date: 1930
- Built by: Churchill River Power Company
- Owner: SaskPower
- Operator: SaskPower

Dam and spillways
- Impounds: Churchill River

Reservoir
- Creates: Sokatisewin Lake
- Catchment area: 210,000 km^{2} (81,000 sq mi)
- Surface area: 4,708 ha (11,630 acres)

Island Falls Hydroelectric Station
- Operator: SaskPower
- Commission date: 1930
- Turbines: 7
- Installed capacity: 111 MW (149,000 hp)
- Website; SaskPower

Island Falls is a hydroelectric power station in the Canadian province of Saskatchewan. It is operated by SaskPower — a Crown corporation — and is situated on the Churchill River about 97 kilometres (60 mi) northwest of Flin Flon, Manitoba. Island Falls was the first hydroelectric power plant in Saskatchewan. It was built between 1928 and 1930 by the Churchill River Power Company, a subsidiary of Hudbay, to provide electricity for the Hudbay mining operations at Flin Flon and Cold Lake, Manitoba.

The drainage basin above the power site covers much of northwest Saskatchewan, about 210,000 square kilometres (81,000 sq mi). The basin contains several large lakes providing natural reservoirs, the largest one being Reindeer Lake at 6,650 square kilometres (2,570 sq mi). The dam itself crosses the Churchill River creating the 4,708-hectare (11,630-acre) Sokatisewin Lake. On the downstream side of the dam, the Churchill River flows into Wasawakasik Lake. The river's "mean annual flow volume" at the dam is 21,620,000 dam^{3} (17,530,000 acre⋅ft).

As part of the consolidation of generation sources in the province, SaskPower purchased the plant from HBM&S in 1981, which continued to operate it for several years. Since 1985 the plant is entirely owned and operated by SaskPower.

== Construction ==
The construction of the power plant was difficult, as transportation routes did not exist north of the rail-head in Flin Flon, Manitoba. In summer, 69 kilometres (43 mi) of roads were built between a series of six lakes, and scows installed on those lakes. Heavy hauling had to take place during a two-month period in late winter when the lake ice was thick enough. Construction material was carried a distance of 116 kilometres (72 mi) by trains of up to six sleighs hauled by 75 kW (100 hp) Linn tractors. The average load was about 77 tons per train, while the total freight carried over two winters was 35,000 tons. At that time, it was considered to be the most ambitious winter hauling enterprise ever undertaken in Canada.

Power for construction was supplied by two small turbines at a temporary hydro-electric plant and dam at Spruce Falls on Swan River, about 23 kilometres (14 mi) down river (east), where Chicken and Kipahigan Lakes drain into the Sisipuk Lake of the Churchill River. The dam, now referred to as the Chicken Lake Dam, is owned and operated by the Saskatchewan Water Security Agency.

The Island Falls power dam spanned the main river channel at Big Eddy Falls, where there was a drop of 17 metres (56 ft). In addition, a number of earthen dams were built along the margin of the head pond (fore bay) to prevent overflow. About 1.6 kilometres (1 mi) south, a 270-metre (900 ft) concrete spillway dam known as "A-dam" was built across a low area on dry land later to be flooded. The fore bay was filled during July 1930, completely submerging the three low falls from which Island Falls gets its name. In August 1930, A-dam was opened and the massive flood of escaping water flushed out a second channel, thus creating an island. The stretch of river affected by the Island Falls development extends from Big Eddy Falls, where the power plant is located, to Mussena Rapids, a distance of approximately 21 kilometres (13 mi).

== The power plant ==
Initially, the power plant held the two 930 kW (1,250 hp) units brought up from Spruce Falls, and three large turbine units each rated at 10,000 kW (14,000 hp) under a 17 m (56 ft) head at 163.6 rpm. These vertical generators put out 6,600 volts, which was stepped up to 110,000 volts for transmission over 190 feet (58 m) of line to Flin Flon and the 72 kilometres (45 mi) branch line to the Sherritt-Gordon Mine at Cold Lake. The first transmission of electricity to Flin Flon took place in June 1930. In following years, additional 14,000 kW (19,000 hp) units were added: Unit 4 in 1936, Unit 5 in 1938, Unit 6 in 1947, and Unit 7 in 1959. The total output of the power plant is now well over 75,000 kW (100,000 hp).

SaskPower continues to modernize and maintain the plant, with re-runnering and upgrade of controls for units 4, 5, and 6 under way as of 2012. The utility currently projects that Island Falls generating units will continue in operation into their ninth decade before retirement.

== The community of Island Falls ==
From 1929 to 1967, Island Falls was also the name of the small, remote settlement of about two hundred people located on the man-made Davis Island near the power plant. Called "The Camp" by its residents, it was home to the families of operators, electricians, machinists, administrators, labourers, and men of many other skills employed by the Churchill River Power Company.

The original buildings dating from 1929 were made from locally sawn spruce and pine trees. They were distinctively clad with vertical, bark-covered slabs on the walls, roofed with black tarpaper, insulated with sawdust, fully plumbed, and electrically heated. During the 1940s, the old dwellings were replaced by second-generation houses. These fully modern houses, including utilities, were provided free to employees.

Winters being long and cold, the community had facilities necessary for self-sufficiency, including a two-room school, gymnasium, cinema, curling rink, and hockey arena. A "Community Club" was generously supported by the company, so residents were regularly treated to movies and social gatherings. Summers days were warm and long. Most people spent considerable time out-of-doors and made good use of the community boathouse. Many families had summer cottages along the river, some of which are still in use.

=== Transportation ===
Provisions such as canned and frozen foods were available at a company commissary, while fresh food was flown in by airplane. The Community had always been serviced by air, but 'freeze-up' of the river in the fall and 'break-up' of the ice in spring prevented aircraft from landing for weeks at a time. Surface transportation was essential, therefore the original route from the construction period was maintained. This route consisted of a series of lakes on which canoes and larger boats were moored. On the portages between the lakes, old vehicles were stationed. Passengers and freight could move to or from Flin Flon in about a day. The "lakes and portages" route continued to be used regularly into the 1950s.

Linn tractor trains continued to be used for transporting heavy supplies in winter over the frozen lakes, but in the 1940s much faster Bombardier snowmobiles began to carry mail and passengers. By the 1950s, many families had purchased older-style automobiles and were able to travel independently to Flin Flon for visiting, shopping, and recreation. In 1967, a permanent road to Flin Flon via Pelican Narrows and the Hanson Lake Road was completed. Ironically, the community of Island Falls closed down that year.

=== The closing of the settlement ===
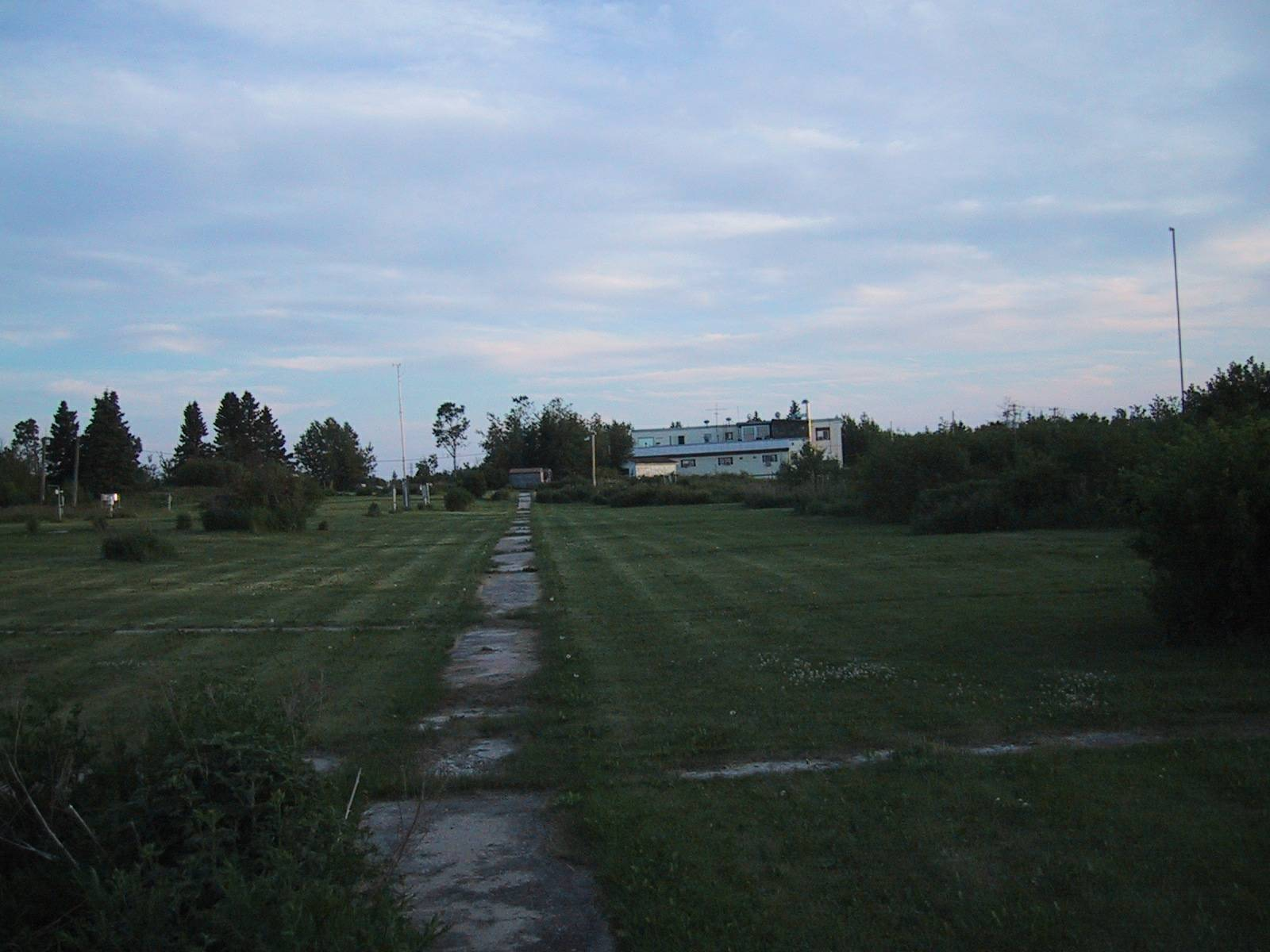
Former site of the Island Falls company houses

By 1967, when technology permitted the power plant to be run by remote control, HBM&S management decided it was no longer feasible to support the settlement near the power plant. As a result of automation, CRP Co. employees and their families were moved to jobs in Flin Flon or into retirement. Thereafter, plant operators drove to Island Falls to work their shifts and were accommodated in a staff house.

The company houses and other buildings such as the community hall remained vacant until the power plant was taken over by SaskPower in 1981. By 1988, all the buildings had been removed or demolished. Except for the two-storey commissary, which now serves as a staff house, all that remains of the settlement of Island Falls are the sidewalks leading to the places where houses once stood.

== See also ==
- List of generating stations in Saskatchewan
- List of dams and reservoirs in Canada

== Notes ==
1. In August 1958, the island on which the settlement stood was renamed Davis Island in honour of Rees W. Davis, an American engineer from Utah who was superintendent of the Churchill River Power Company from startup until his retirement that year.
2. To a considerable extent, the power plant facilities were, and continue to be, serviced by First Nations workers from the nearby village of Sandy Bay. Most of the plant operators are now from Sandy Bay as well.
