= Nemei Lake =

Lake in Saskatchewan, Canada

- Location in Saskatchewan Nemei Lake (Canada)

- McArthur, Nemei, and Tocher Lakes drain into the Nemei River
- Location: Northern Saskatchewan Administration District
- Coordinates: 55.3063°N 102.3567°W
- Type: Glacial lake
- Etymology: Indigenous word meaning "Sturgeon"
- Part of: Churchill River drainage basin
- River sources: Canadian Shield
- Primary outflows: Nemei River
- Basin countries: Canada
- Max. length: 9.7 km (6.0 mi)
- Max. width: 4.8 km (3.0 mi)
- Surface area: 480.8 ha (1,188 acres)
- Shore length^{1}: 34 km (21 mi)
- Surface elevation: 343 m (1,125 ft)
- Settlements: None
- ^{1} Shore length is not a well-defined measure.

Nemei Lake is a glacial lake in the Canadian province of Saskatchewan. The lake is about 67 kilometres (42 mi) north-northwest of Creighton in the Northern Saskatchewan Administration District. It is the source of the Nemei River, which is a tributary of the Churchill River. Both McArthur Lake and the bifurcating Kakinagimak Lake flow into Nemei Lake from the south. Nemei is an Indigenous word meaning "Sturgeon".

There is no highway access to the lake. Access is by canoe following rivers and portages or from Flin Flon, Manitoba, via floatplane to a fly-in fishing lodge on an island in the lake.

== Fish species ==
Fish commonly found in Nemei Lake include lake whitefish, walleye, lake trout, and northern pike.

== See also ==
- List of lakes of Saskatchewan
