= Nemei River =

River in Saskatchewan, Canada

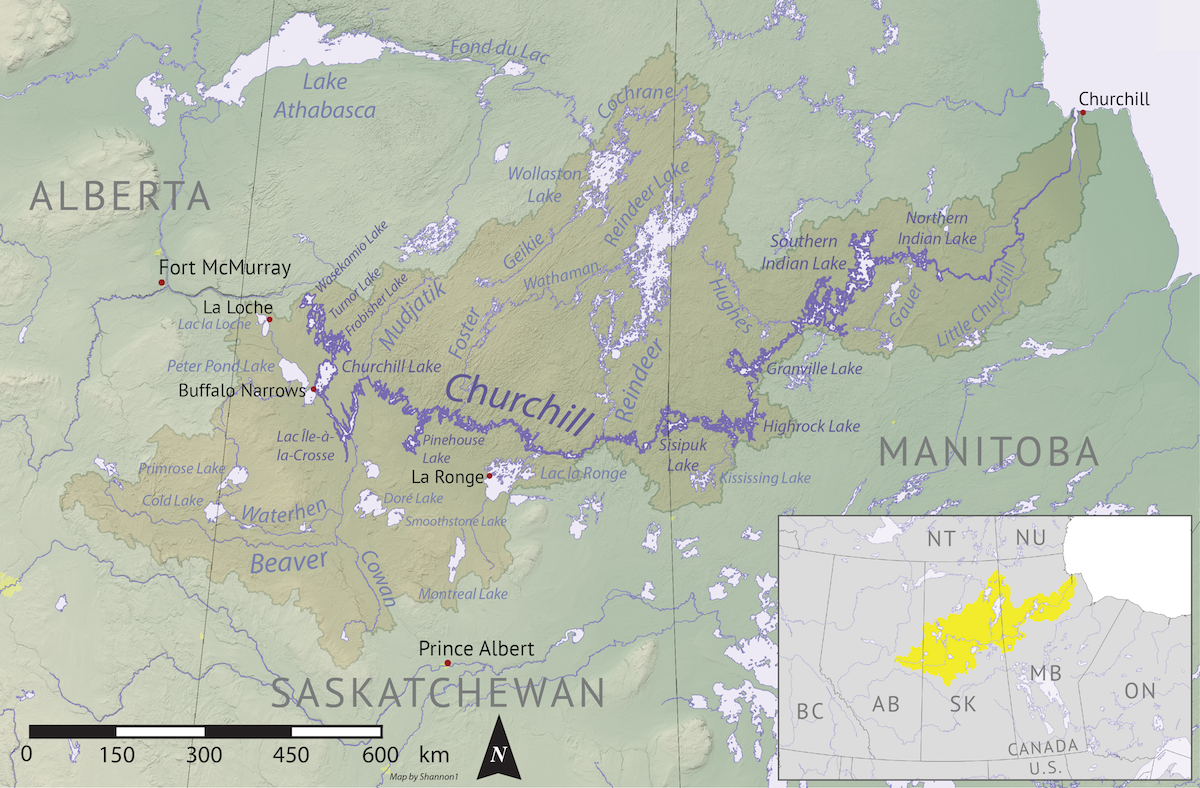
- Churchill River drainage basin

- Location of river's mouth in Saskatchewan Nemei River (Canada)
- Etymology: Indigenous word meaning "Sturgeon"

Location
- Country: Canada
- Province: Saskatchewan

Physical characteristics
- Source: Nemei Lake
  - location: Northern Administration District, Saskatchewan
  - coordinates: 55.3107°N 102.3519°W
- Mouth: Wasawakasik Lake along the Churchill River
  - location: Northern Administration District
  - coordinates: 55.4757°N 102.3275°W
  - elevation: 308 m (1,010 ft)

Basin features
- River system: Churchill River

Nemei River is a tributary of the Churchill River in the Canadian province of Saskatchewan. It begins at Nemei Lake and flows northward to join the Churchill River south of the community of Sandy Bay. The river runs through low relief terrain of the Canadian Shield and the climate is sub-arctic.

Nemei is Indigenous for "sturgeon".

== Location ==
Nemei River (top-right) with surrounding lakes

The Nemei river flows into the Churchill river at Wasawakasik Lake south of Sandy Bay. Wasawakasik Lake is a lake along the course of the Churchill River immediately downstream from the Island Falls Dam. (Note: According to Natural Resources Canada the mouth of the Nemei River (HAMMP) is at 55.4667489°N 102.3170586°W. According to Google maps (satellite view) the mouth location is slightly west and north of this location, which is a point on Highway 135. The land is very flat, and the river may have been diverted or shifted course naturally.) Its mouth is at an altitude of 308 metres (1,010 ft). Phelan Lake drains northwest into Nemei Lake and then via the Nemei River to the Churchill River. Phelan Lake is accessible from the south via the Wildnest-Kakinagimak-Nemei Lakes water route. Robbestad Lake, McArthur Lake and the northern part of Kakinagimak Lake also drain northward via the Nemei River.

== Environment ==
The Nemei River is in the subarctic climate zone. The annual average temperature is −3 °C (27 °F). The warmest month is July, when the average temperature is 16 °C (61 °F), and the coldest is January, at −22 °C (−8 °F). The region has low relief topography typical of most of the Canadian Shield. Generally elevations vary by less than 100 feet (30 m), but some hills and ridges to the east rise more than 350 feet (110 m) above the lakes. The land around the river is mainly forested.

Highway 135 crosses the river on a berm, with the river directed through the berm along tubular culverts. These were initially installed too high, emptying above the downstream river level and thus blocking fish passage. New 3 metres (9.8 ft) tubular culverts were later installed at river level so the fish could swim upstream.

== See also ==
- List of rivers of Saskatchewan
- Hudson Bay drainage basin

== Sources ==
- "55.475699,-102.327538", Google maps (Satellite view)
- Canada. Parliament (1918), Sessional Papers of the Dominion of Canada
- Churchill River General Description: Feb. 23, 1924, Saskatchewan Archives Board
- "Dataset Index", NASA Earth Observations Data, NASA, archived from the original on 16 April 2020
- "Land Cover Classification (1 year)", NASA Earth Observations Data, NASA, archived from the original on 31 August 2016
- "Nemei River", Mapcarta
- Nemei River, Natural Resources Canada
- Peel, M. C.; Finlayson, B. L.; McMahon, T. A. (2007). "Updated world map of the Köppen-Geiger climate classification" (PDF). Hydrology and Earth System Sciences. 11 (5): 1633–1644. Bibcode:2007HESS...11.1633P. doi:10.5194/hess-11-1633-2007. Archived (PDF) from the original on 2 December 2019.
- Pyke, M. W. (1961), The Geology of the Attitti Lake Area (West Half) Saskatchewan (PDF), Saskatchewan Department of Mineral Resources, archived from the original (PDF) on 9 November 2018
- Pyke, M. W. (1965), The Geology of the Nemei Lake Area (East Half) Saskatchewan (PDF), Department of Mineral Resources, Province of Saskatchewan
- SENTAR Consultants (March 1995), Fish Habitat Protection Guidelines : Road Construction and Stream Crossings (PDF), Saskatchewan Environment and Resource Management
