= Chicken Lake =

Lake in Saskatchewan, Canada

- Barrier Lake
- Location in Saskatchewan Chicken Lake (Canada)
- Location: Northern Administration District, Saskatchewan
- Coordinates: 55.5189°N 101.9597°W
- Part of: Churchill River drainage basin
- Primary inflows: Kipahigan Lake
- Primary outflows: Sisipuk Lake (Churchill River)
- Basin countries: Canada
- Managing agency: Saskatchewan Water Security Agency
- Surface area: 2,146 ha (5,300 acres)
- Shore length^{1}: 150 km (93 mi)
- Surface elevation: 292 m (958 ft)
- Settlements: None
- ^{1} Shore length is not a well-defined measure.

Chicken Lake, also known as Barrier Lake, is a large, irregularly shaped lake in the Canadian provinces of Saskatchewan and Manitoba. Only a very small portion of the south-eastern corner of the lake is in Manitoba. The lake is within the Nelson–Churchill River watershed, which is the third largest drainage basin in North America. Chicken Lake's primary inflow is from a channel at its southern end connecting it to Kipahigan Lake. At the northern end, the lake is connected to Sisipuk Lake through the Swan River channel. Sisipuk Lake is a lake along the course of the Churchill River. Chicken Lake Dam is situated along Swan River connecting Chicken Lake to Sisipuk Lake. The Swan River, while only about 6 kilometres (3.7 mi) long, has a drainage basin of about 1,800 km^{2} (690 sq mi).

Kipahigan Sakahikan 222 Indian reserve is at the southern end of Chicken Lake. The reserve is also along the northern shores of Kipahigan Lake.

== Chicken Lake Dam ==
Chicken Lake Dam (55.6011°N 102.0189°W) was built in 1929 at Spruce Falls along the Swan River in the channel connecting Chicken Lake to Churchill River. It is 2.4 metres (7 ft 10 in) high. The dam is owned and operated by the Saskatchewan Water Security Agency. In 1929, along with the dam, a hydroelectric power station was constructed on site. The power station was built to supply electricity for the construction of Island Falls Hydroelectric Station about 23 kilometres (14 mi) upstream along the Churchill River. Initial construction began in 1928 and the power station was in operation from 20 March 1929 until 5 June 1930 when No. 1 Unit at Island Falls took up the load. The Spruce Falls power plant was disassembled and the generating units were transported to Island Falls.

== Fish species ==
Fish commonly found in Chicken Lake include burbot, cisco, lake whitefish, northern pike, sauger, and walleye.

== See also ==
- List of lakes of Saskatchewan
- List of lakes of Manitoba
- List of dams and reservoirs in Canada
