= Denare Beach =

Village in Saskatchewan, Canada

Denare Beach ᒨᓇᐦᐃᓲᓂᔮᐚᓂᕽ mônahisôniyâwânihk
- Northern village
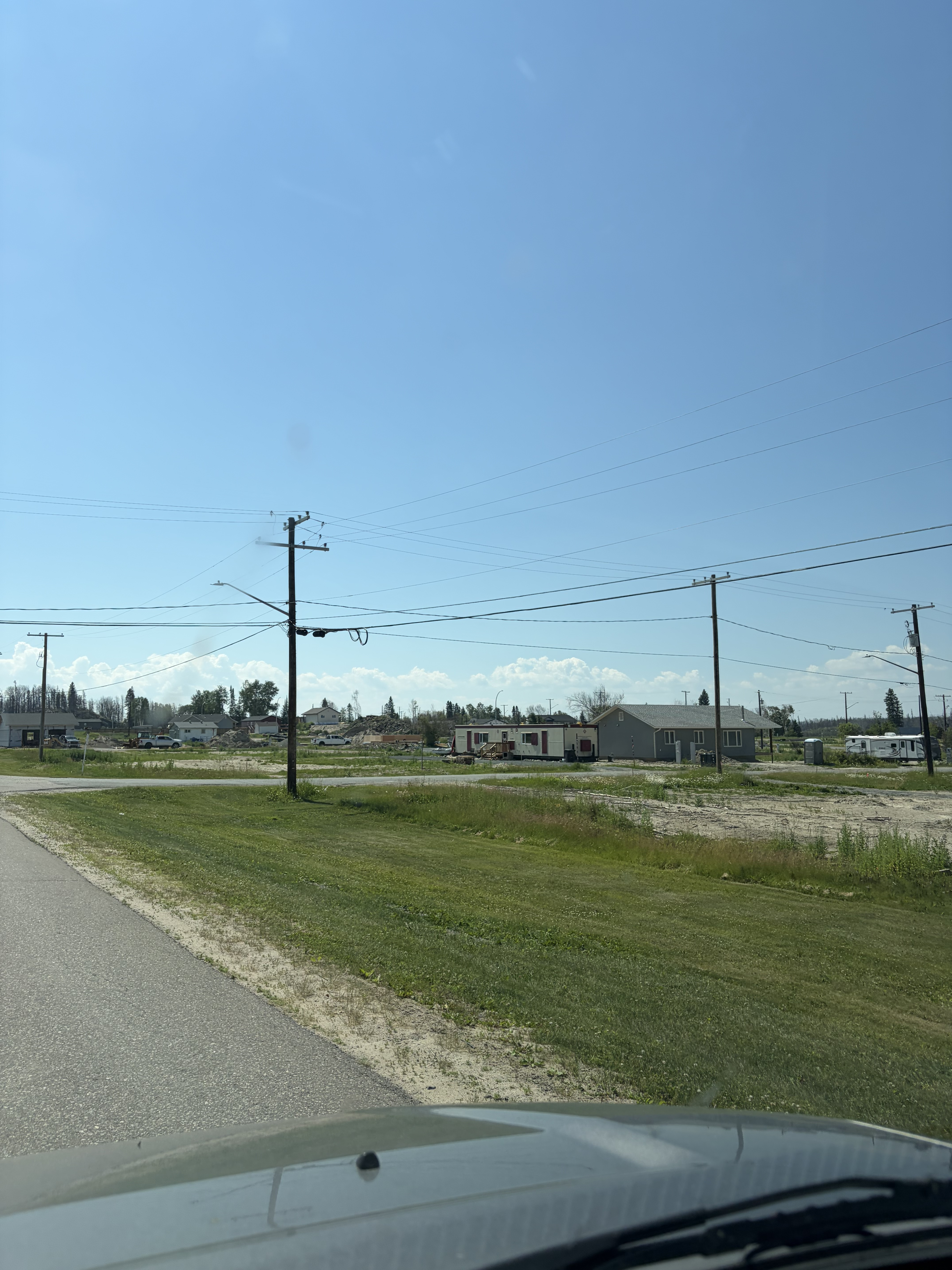
- Denare Beach rebuilding in 2026 after the Wolf Fire

- Location of Denare Beach in Saskatchewan
- Coordinates: 54°40′0″N 102°5′0″W
- Country: Canada
- Province: Saskatchewan
- District: Northern Saskatchewan Administration District

Population (2021)
  - Total: 699
- Website: www.denarebeach.net

Denare Beach is a northern village on the east shore of Amisk Lake, Saskatchewan. Located on Highway 167, the community is 20 kilometres (12 mi) south-west of Flin Flon and 422 kilometres (262 mi) north-east of Prince Albert.

== History ==
The area originally settled around Amisk Lake was called "Beaver Lake". Amisk is Cree for Beaver and thus the origin of the name. In 1937, the subdivision of the present community of Denare Beach took place. The community quickly became a resort area following the construction of a roadway to the mining centre of Flin Flon. When Saskatchewan Parks became responsible for the area they changed the name from Amisk or Beaver to Denare Beach. Taking the first two letters from Department of Natural Resources they arrived at the name of Denare Beach. The community has managed to retain its resort atmosphere. On 2 June 2025, most of the town was consumed by the fast moving Wolf wildfire.

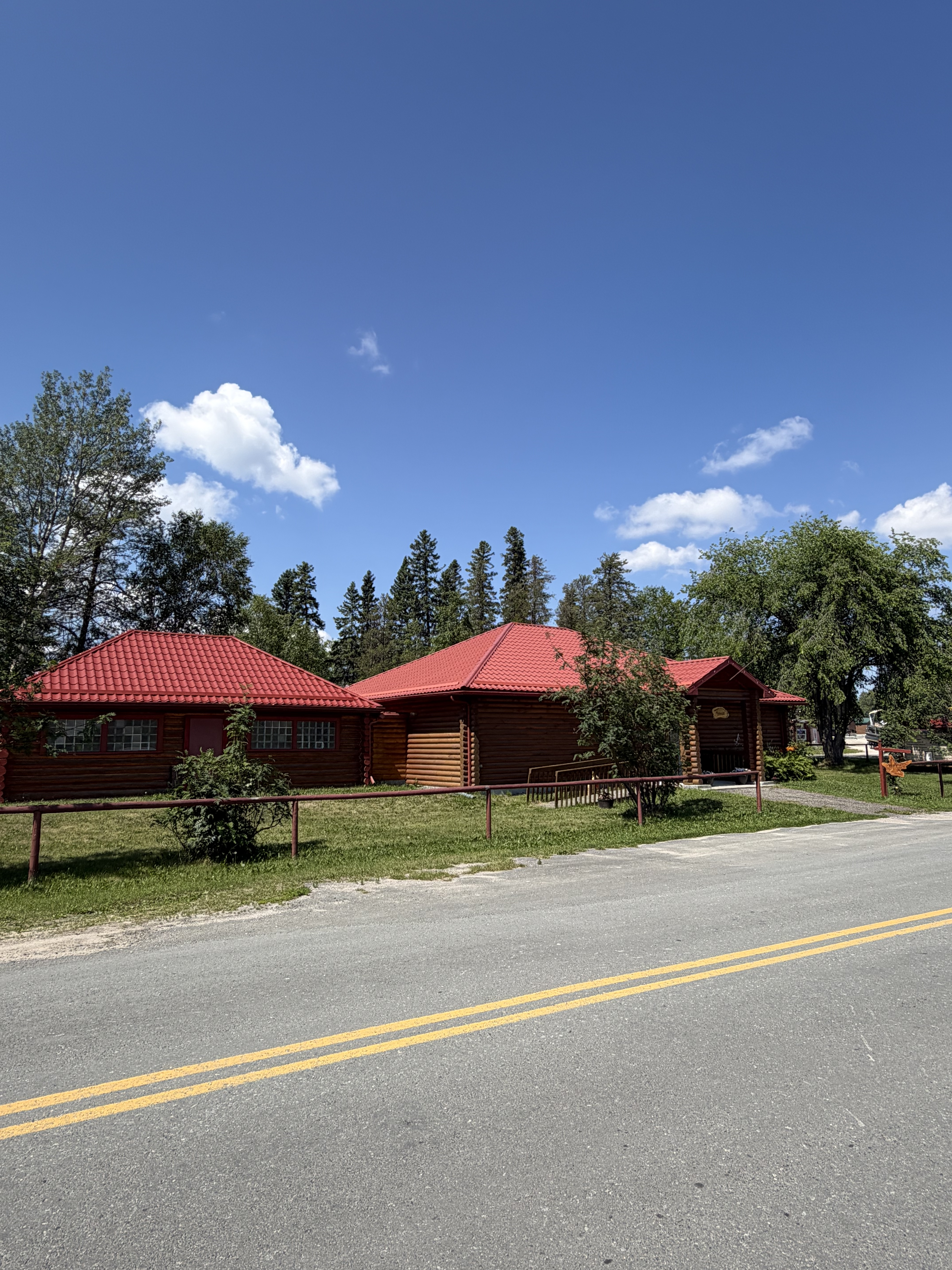
Denare Beach museum and former schoolhouse

== Demographics ==
In the 2011 Census, Denare Beach had a population of 820 living in 310 of its 449 total private dwellings.

In the 2021 Census of Population conducted by Statistics Canada, Denare Beach had a population of 699 living in 294 of its 411 total private dwellings, a change of −1.4% from its 2016 population of 709. With a land area of 6.4 km^{2} (2.5 sq mi), it had a population density of 109.2/km^{2} (282.9/sq mi) in 2021.

== Economy ==
The Konuto Lake mine operated by Hudson Bay Mining & Smelting Company Limited was located less than 2 kilometres (1.2 mi) south-east of Denare Beach.

== Medical service ==
Due to the small population of Denare Beach, the Government of Saskatchewan permits its residents in Creighton, Denare Beach, Sandy Bay, and Pelican Narrows to utilize the basic and emergency medical services of Flin Flon. The nearest Saskatchewan medical centre is in Prince Albert, 400 kilometres (250 mi) south-west of Creighton. One of the most frequently accessed services is the Flin Flon General Hospital, and Flin Flon Ambulance Service.

== See also ==
- List of communities in Northern Saskatchewan
- List of communities in Saskatchewan
- List of villages in Saskatchewan
