= Spruce Falls (Saskatchewan) =

Waterfall on the Swan River in Saskatchewan, Canada

- Location within Saskatchewan Location within Canada
- Location: Saskatchewan, Canada
- Coordinates: 55.6011°N 102.0189°W
- Total height: 7.6 m (25 ft)
- Watercourse: Swan River

Spruce Falls was the local name for a small waterfall where the Swan River empties into Sisipuk Lake in north-eastern Saskatchewan, near the Manitoba border. In 1928, Spruce Falls became the site of a dam and temporary power plant supplying the Island Falls hydroelectric power development upstream on the Churchill River.

The Swan River, about 6 kilometres (3.7 mi) in length, is the outlet channel from Chicken Lake (also known as Barrier Lake) into Sisipuk Lake. Sisipuk Lake, also known as Duck Lake, is a large lake along the course of the Churchill River. Swan River has a drainage area of 1,800 square kilometres (700 mi^{2}) consisting of a number of lakes, chief among which are Chicken, Mari, and Kipahigan Lakes.

== Spruce Falls and the Island Falls Power Development ==
A large amount of power is required for construction purposes on a job the size of the Island Falls development. As steam and gasoline units could be used only to a minor extent, owing to the high cost of transporting fuel, the only alternative was to find a site where hydroelectric energy could be generated. Engineers for the Churchill River Power Company determined that Spruce Falls, about 21.7 kilometres (13 1/2 mi) north-east of Island Falls, was suitable.

By utilizing the natural fall of 7.6 metres (25 ft) at Spruce Falls in addition to a 4.6-metre-high (15 ft) timber dam which impounded a small forebay, a head of 12 metres (40 ft) was developed. Water from the head pond was conveyed to generator turbines by two wood stave pipes 2.1 metres (7 ft) wide and 27 metres (90 ft) long.

== The powerhouse ==
The Spruce Falls temporary powerhouse was a frame building on the shore of Sisipuk Lake. It contained two small generating units and complementary equipment. These two 930 kW (1,250 hp) vertical-type turbines, with propeller-type runners, were directly connected to 1,000 kV⋅A generators delivering power at 600 volts, 3 phase, 60 cycles to a bank of transformers.

The transformer bank was placed apart from the powerhouse and protected by a lightning arrester and fuses. Rated at 2,000 kV⋅A, these transformers stepped the voltage up to 26,400 volts for transmission to Island Falls. There, a sub-station stepped the current down to 600 volts for two motor-generator sets which supplied current for the electric locomotives used in hauling earth, concrete and other construction materials.

== Completion of the project ==
Work on the temporary power plant was started on October 4, 1928. Its operation began on March 20, 1929, and continued without interruption until No. 1 Unit at Island Falls took up the load on June 5, 1930. Subsequently, the Spruce Falls plant was dismantled, and, under very difficult freighting conditions due to snow and weak ice, the two small generating units were brought to Island Falls, where they were permanently installed in 1933.

During the period of operation this plant supplied 4,698,000 kWh of electrical energy for construction purposes, at an average cost of 4.35 cents per kilowatt-hour.

Today, the dam at the site — known as Chicken Lake Dam — is owned and operated by the Saskatchewan Water Security Agency.

== See also ==
- List of waterfalls
- List of waterfalls in Canada

== Notes ==
1. A dry season in 1929 resulted in low water level in 1930 and it became necessary to find additional sources of water in order to maintain the amount of power required for construction. The outlet of Chicken Lake was cut through, and its 140 square kilometres (55 mi^{2}) of water was lowered 1.8 metres (6 ft) in order to furnish enough power to complete the construction at Island Falls. After construction, the outlet was replaced by a faced, rock-filled, timber-crib weir, thus restoring Chicken Lake to its former elevation.
