= Spruce Falls =

Spruce Falls may refer to:

- Spruce Falls (Saskatchewan), a former waterfall in Canada
- Spruce Falls, a paper mill at Kapuskasing, in Ontario, Canada
