= Sokatisewin Lake =

Lake in Saskatchewan, Canada

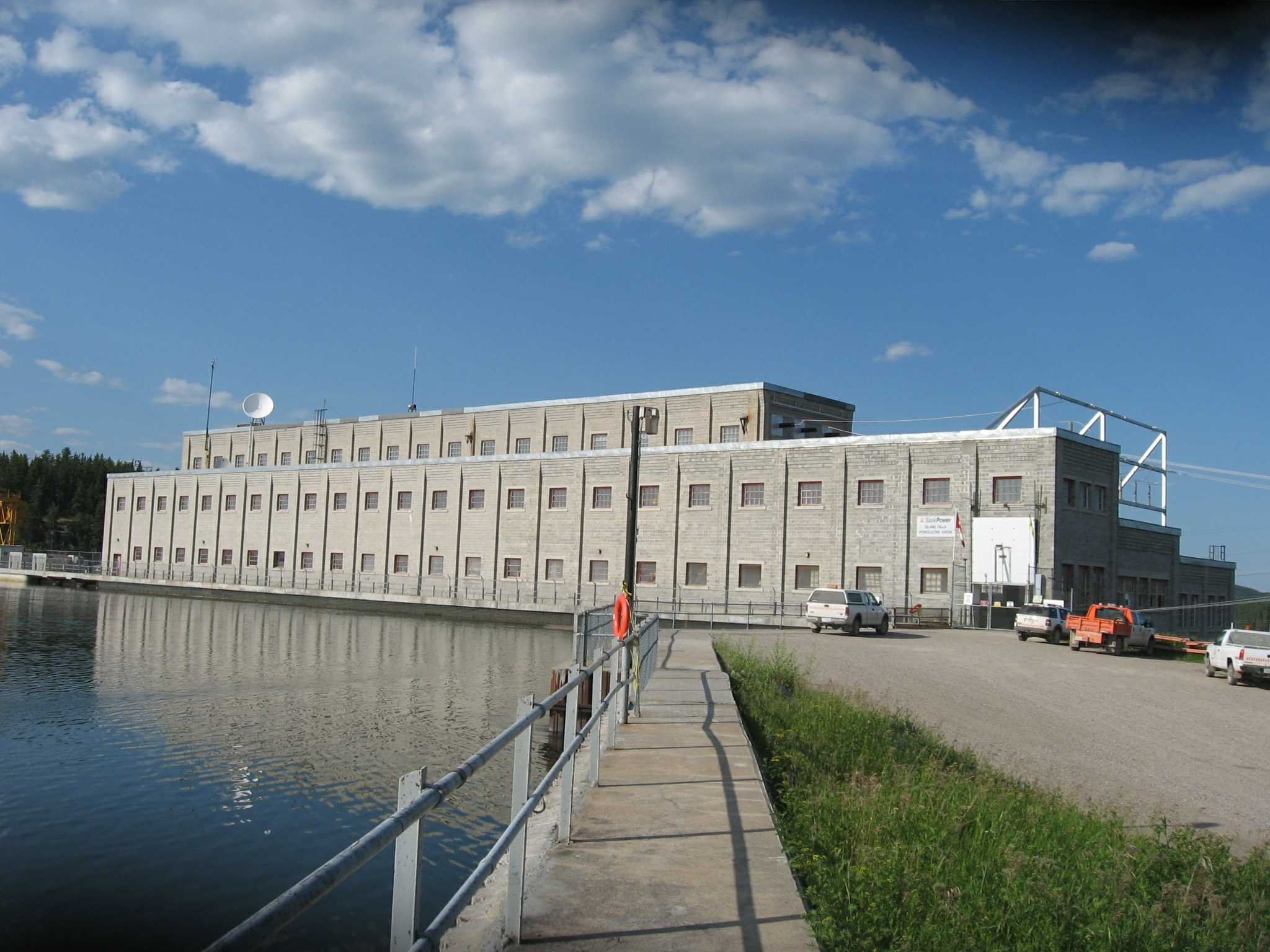
- Island Falls Hydroelectric Station at Sokatisewin Lake

- Location in Saskatchewan Sokatisewin Lake (Canada)
- Location: Northern Saskatchewan Administration District
- Coordinates: 55.5001°N 102.4171°W
- Part of: Churchill River drainage basin
- Primary inflows: Churchill River
- Primary outflows: Churchill River
- Catchment area: 210,000 km^{2} (81,000 sq mi)
- Basin countries: Canada
- Managing agency: SaskPower
- First flooded: 1930
- Surface area: 4,708 ha (11,630 acres)
- Max. depth: 32.5 m (107 ft)
- Shore length^{1}: 271.4 km (168.6 mi)
- Surface elevation: 299 m (981 ft)
- Islands: Campbell Island; Davis Island
- ^{1} Shore length is not a well-defined measure.

Sokatisewin Lake is a lake in the Canadian province of Saskatchewan. It is about 87 kilometres (54 mi) north-northwest of Creighton along the course of the Churchill River. At the lake's eastern end, a dam and Island Falls Hydroelectric Station were completed in 1930 at the site of the 17-metre (56 ft) high Big Eddy Falls. It was the first hydroelectric power plant in Saskatchewan. While there are no cities on the lake, there is the former settlement of Island Falls and the Sokatisewin Sakahikan 224 Indian reserve. The reserve is located along the lake's south-western shore and the remains of Island Falls is at the eastern end near the hydroelectric station on the man-made Davis Island. A fishing and hunting outfitters is a short distance east from the reserve. Access to the outfitters and the Indian reserve is from Highway 135.

The Churchill River is largely a series of interconnecting lakes. Upstream along the river from Sokatisewin Lake is Reeds Lake and downstream is Wasawakasik Lake. The mean annual flow volume of the Churchill River at the lake's outflow is 21,620,000 dam^{3} (17,530,000 acre⋅ft). Johnson Bay along the lake's southern shore is named after Russell John Johnson. It was named through the GeoMemorial Commemorative Naming Program, which is a program that names geographical features in honour of those who lost their lives in the service of Canada.

== Fish species ==
Fish species commonly found in Sokatisewin Lake include walleye, lake sturgeon, sauger, northern pike, cisco, white sucker, longnose sucker, lake whitefish, burbot, and yellow perch.

== See also ==
- List of lakes of Saskatchewan
