= Stanley 157A =

Indian reserve in Saskatchewan, Canada

Coordinates: 55°23′56″N 104°22′06″W

- Indian reserve
- Stanley Indian Reserve No. 157A
- Location in Saskatchewan
- First Nation: Lac La Ronge Indian Band
- Country: Canada
- Province: Saskatchewan

Area
  - Total: 3.8 ha (9.4 acres)

Stanley 157A is an Indian reserve of the Lac La Ronge Indian Band in Saskatchewan, Canada. It is 66 kilometres (41 mi) north-east of La Ronge, and 11 kilometres (6.8 mi) east of Stanley Mission at the mouth of Rapid River on the south shore of Nistowiak Lake. Nistowiak Lake is a lake along the course of the Churchill River.

== See also ==
- List of Indian reserves in Saskatchewan
