= Pelican Narrows 184B =

Indian reserve in Saskatchewan, Canada

Coordinates: 55°10′30″N 102°54′33″W

- Indian reserve
- Pelican Narrows Indian Reserve No. 184B
- Location in Saskatchewan
- First Nation: Peter Ballantyne
- Country: Canada
- Province: Saskatchewan

Area
  - Total: 529.7 ha (1,309 acres)

Population (2016)
  - Total: 1,869
  - Density: 352.8/km^{2} (913.9/sq mi)
- Community Well-Being Index: 34

Pelican Narrows 184B is an Indian reserve of the Peter Ballantyne Cree Nation in Saskatchewan. It is about 80 kilometres (50 mi) north-east of Flin Flon, located directly adjacent to the northern village of Pelican Narrows on the eastern shore of Pelican Lake and the entrance to Opawikusehikan Narrows. In the 2016 Canadian Census, it recorded a population of 1869 living in 327 of its 350 total private dwellings. In the same year, its Community Well-Being index was calculated at 34 of 100, compared to 58.4 for the average First Nations community and 77.5 for the average non-Indigenous community.

== See also ==
- List of Indian reserves in Saskatchewan
