= Rapid River (Churchill River tributary) =

River in Saskatchewan, Canada

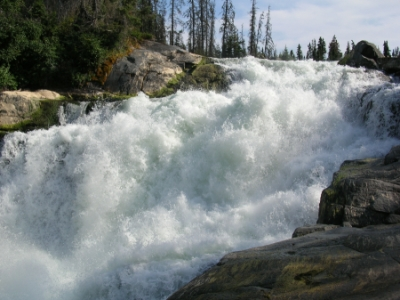
- Nistowiak Falls on the Rapid River

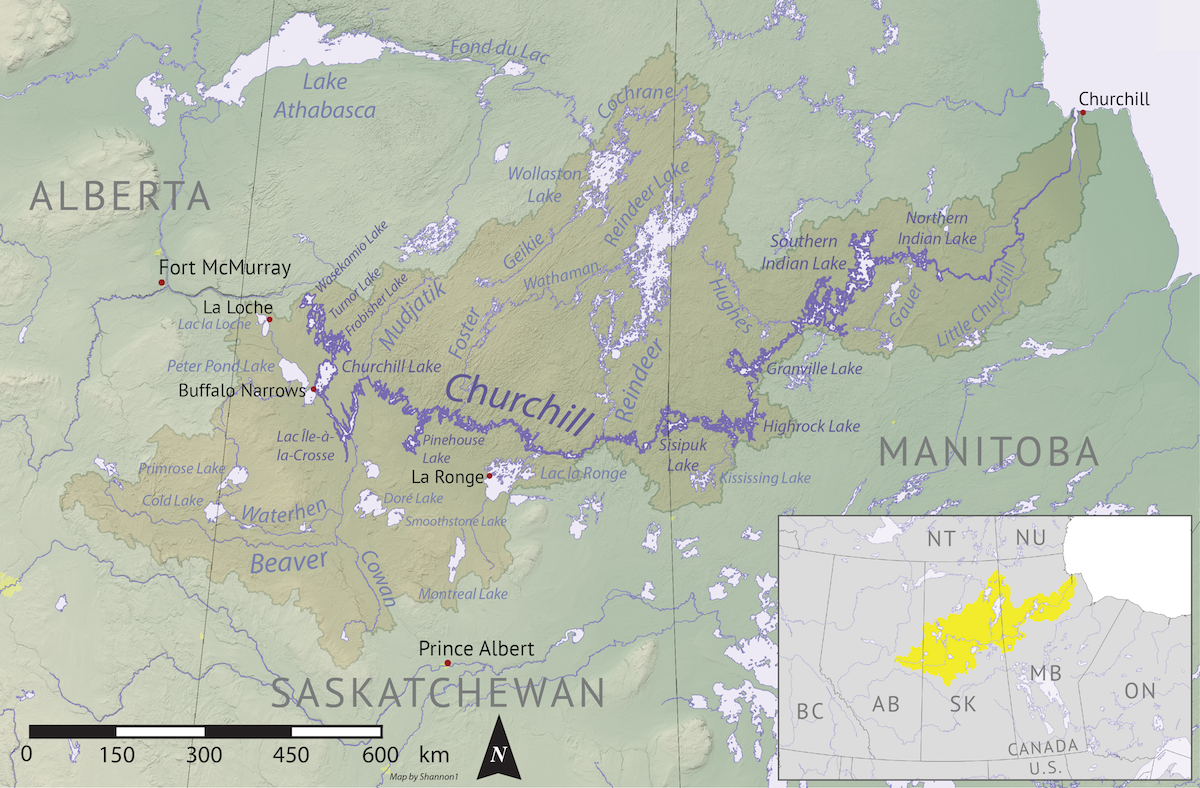
- Churchill River drainage basin

- Location of the mouth in Saskatchewan Rapid River (Churchill River tributary) (Canada)

Location
- Country: Canada
- Province: Saskatchewan
- Provincial park: Lac La Ronge Provincial Park

Physical characteristics
- Source: Lac la Ronge
  - coordinates: 55.3354°N 104.5342°W
  - elevation: 364 m (1,194 ft)
- Mouth: Nistowiak Lake (Churchill River)
  - location: Lac La Ronge Provincial Park
  - coordinates: 55.4003°N 104.3666°W
  - elevation: 332 m (1,089 ft)

Basin features
- River system: Churchill River

Rapid River is a river in central Saskatchewan, Canada, about 13 kilometres (8 mi) east of the community of Stanley Mission within Lac La Ronge Provincial Park. The river flows north from Lac la Ronge to Nistowiak Lake along the Churchill River via Hale Lake and Iskwatikan Lake. The Churchill River flows east to the Hudson Bay. Between Iskwatikan Lake and Nistowiak Lake, it travels over the Nistowiak Falls, one of the tallest in Saskatchewan, and the Fisher Rapids. At the mouth of the river, on Nistowiak Lake, is the Stanley 157A Indian reserve and Jim's Camp.

== River's course ==
A floatplane flyover of Rapid River in Saskatchewan, including Fisher Rapids and Nistowiak Falls

Rapid River begins at Lac la Ronge's Diefenbaker Bay and Lac la Ronge Dam. It flows north to Rapid River Dam at the south end of Hale Lake. Hale Lake flows into Stewart Bay at the south-west corner of Iskwatikan Lake. Rapid River flows out of Iskwatikan Lake at its northern end and travels about 800 metres (2,600 ft) north to Nistowiak Lake — a lake along the course of the Churchill River. Along this final leg of the river, there's the 10-metre (33 ft) high Nistowiak Falls followed by Fisher Rapids.

== Fish species ==
The fish species commonly found in Rapid River include walleye, sauger, yellow perch, northern pike, lake trout, lake whitefish, cisco, white sucker, shorthead redhorse, longnose sucker, lake sturgeon, and burbot.

== See also ==
- List of rivers of Saskatchewan
- Hudson Bay drainage basin
