= Jan Lake =

Village in Saskatchewan, Canada

- Unincorporated community
- Community of Jan Lake from the air

- Jan Lake (bottom)

- Location within Saskatchewan Location within Canada
- Coordinates: 54.9001°N 102.8171°W
- Country: Canada
- Province: Saskatchewan
- Census division: Division No. 18
- Rural municipality: Northern Administration District
- Elevation: 331 m (1,086 ft)
- Time zone: CST
- Highways: Highway 135
- Waterways: Jan Lake

Jan Lake is a community on the south-eastern shore of Jan Lake on Doupe Bay in the north-eastern part of the Canadian province of Saskatchewan. The community has a Canadian Coast Guard wharf, provincial and private campgrounds, pubs, as well as many tourist lodges, which focus on fishing, camping, and private cabins. Access is from Highway 135 and Jan Lake Airport, which is located along Highway 135, near the intersection with Highway 106.

== Recreation ==
The community of Jan Lake is surrounded by Jan Lake Recreation Site (54.8845°N 102.8169°W). This 5171-acre provincial recreation site has a campground and access to four lakes, including Jan, Callaghan, Garner, and Phaneuf. The campground is operated by Jan Lake Trading Post and has both electric and non-electric campsites and access to the lake for swimming, boating, and fishing. Amenities include modern washrooms / showers, laundry facilities, and a convenience store.

Privately operated campgrounds, cabins, and outfitters include Jan Lake Lodge, F.A.T.S. Camp, and Three Lakes Camp.

Game fish found in Jan Lake include walleye, northern pike, and yellow perch. Fishing season is generally open from May to March.

== See also ==
- List of communities in Saskatchewan
- Tourism in Saskatchewan
