= Creighton Community School =

Community school in Creighton, Saskatchewan

Coordinates: 54.7561°N 101.8974°W

- Creighton, Northern Saskatchewan; Canada

Information
- Type: Rural community school

Creighton Community School (CCS) is a rural public school in Creighton, Northern Saskatchewan. It is the sole member of the Creighton School Division. CCS's educational program covers pre-kindergarten through grade 12. In the 2023 school year, there were 451 students enrolled in the school (453 for K–12 and 16 for PreK), and close to 70 full-time staff, including 33 teachers; of those enrolled, 237 self-identified as part of an Indigenous people (one of First Nations, Métis, or Inuit).

The athletics team of the school is called the "Kodiaks". Available sports for student participation are football, volleyball, cross-country running and skiing, basketball, badminton, and track & field.
