= Sisipuk Lake =

Lake in Western Canada

- Ducks Lake
- Location in Saskatchewan Sisipuk Lake (Canada)
- Location: Northern Manitoba; Northern Saskatchewan
- Coordinates: 55.6892°N 102.0402°W
- Part of: Churchill River drainage basin
- Primary inflows: Churchill River
- Primary outflows: Churchill River
- Basin countries: Canada
- Surface area: 22,213.2 ha (54,890 acres)
- Shore length^{1}: 808 km (502 mi)
- Islands: Emerson Island; Ferris Island; Barker Island; Chapman Island; Blue Island; Cormack Island
- ^{1} Shore length is not a well-defined measure.

Sisipuk Lake is a large lake along the course of the Churchill River in the Canadian provinces of Manitoba and Saskatchewan. Straddling the provincial border, it is surrounded by boreal forest in the Canadian Shield. The climate is subarctic. The nearest community is Sandy Bay, Saskatchewan, about 37 kilometres (23 mi) to the south-west and upstream along the Churchill River. Most of the lake is in Manitoba with only the south-western section being in Saskatchewan. Sisipuk is Cree for "ducks".

== Description ==
Sisipuk Lake, at 22,213.2 ha (54,890 acres) in size, is a large, irregularly shaped lake along the course of the Churchill River. The Churchill River is largely a series of interconnected lakes that begins at Churchill Lake in north-western Saskatchewan and empties into the Hudson Bay at Churchill, Manitoba. Upstream from Sisipuk Lake is Loon Lake and downstream is Bonald Lake. The Churchill River enters Sisipuk Lake in Manitoba at its northern shore, just downstream from Gardiner Island and Sisipuk Rapids. It flows out at the lake's eastern end. Along the southern shore, in the Saskatchewan section of the lake, Chicken Lake flows in through the Swan River channel. The channel is the location of Chicken Lake Dam and the former Spruce Falls.

There are two Indian reserves at the lake — both in Manitoba and both part of Mathias Colomb First Nation. Sisipuk Sakahegan A encompasses a large peninsula jutting out from the southern shore and Kamihkowapihskak Pawistik is at the eastern end and spans the Churchill River connecting Bonald Lake.

The geomemorial naming program names geographical features after Canadians who lost their lives in the service of Canada. Three features in the lake were named through this program. Booth Bay was named after Walter James Booth. Taylor Bay was named after Walter David Taylor. Chapman Island was named after Richard Harker Chapman.

== Fish species ==
Fish species commonly found in Sisipuk Lake include walleye, sauger, goldeye, northern pike, lake whitefish, and burbot.

== See also ==
- List of lakes of Manitoba
- List of lakes of Saskatchewan
