= Nistowiak Falls =

Waterfall on the Rapid River in Saskatchewan, Canada

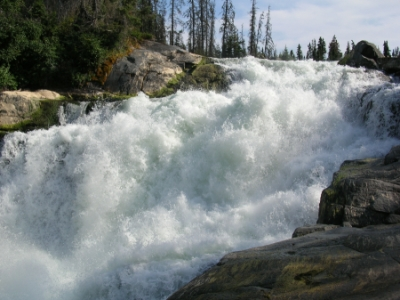
- Nistowiak Falls
- Interactive map of Nistowiak Falls
- Location: Lac La Ronge Provincial Park, Saskatchewan, Canada
- Coordinates: 55.3955°N 104.3667°W
- Type: Cataract
- Total height: 10 metres (33 ft)
- Watercourse: Rapid River

Nistowiak Falls in Saskatchewan

A floatplane flyover of Rapid River in Saskatchewan, including Fisher Rapids and Nistowiak Falls.

Nistowiak Falls, at 10 metres (33 ft), is one of the highest waterfalls in the province of Saskatchewan, Canada. The falls are on the Rapid River, which flows north from Iskwatikan Lake into Nistowiak Lake on the Churchill River. Nistowiak is a Cree word referring to the convergence of waters.

== Access ==
The closest access is from Stanley Mission, which is part of the Lac La Ronge Indian Band. Stanley Mission is at the north end of Highway 915, which connects via Highway 102 to Highway 2 in La Ronge. From Stanley Mission, it is about 20 kilometres (12 mi) east by water on the Churchill River. The falls, Iskwatikan Lake and the south shore of Nistowiak Lake are within Lac La Ronge Provincial Park. There is a tourist fishing camp on the west side of the Rapid River at Nistowiak Lake called Jim's Camp. Some minimal supplies can be obtained there. The trail to the falls goes through the fishing camp for part of the way. Lac la Ronge drains into the Churchill River through these falls.

== Photos ==
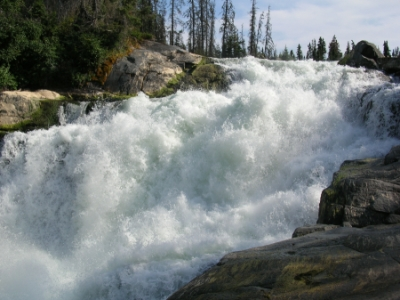
View of upper Nistowiak Falls

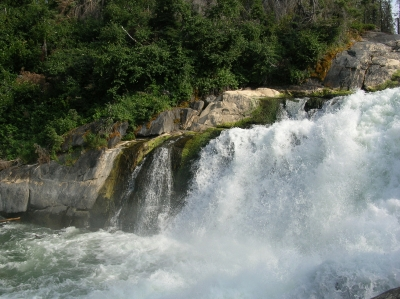
View of lower reaches of Nistowiak Falls

== See also ==
- List of waterfalls
- List of waterfalls in Canada
