= Kipahigan Lake =

Lake in Western Canada

- Location in Manitoba Kipahigan Lake (Canada)
- Location: Division No. 21, Manitoba / Northern Administration District, Saskatchewan
- Coordinates: 55°21′N 101°58′W
- Part of: Churchill River drainage basin
- Primary outflows: Chicken Lake
- Basin countries: Canada
- Surface area: 11,121.2 ha (27,481 acres)
- Surface elevation: 292 m (958 ft)
- Islands: Withers Island; Boulton Island; Buckingham Island; Collins Island; Lechowicz Island; Bell Island
- Settlements: None

Kipahigan Lake is a lake in Northern Manitoba and Northern Saskatchewan, Canada, approximately 50 kilometres (31 mi) north of Flin Flon. The lake is in the Canadian Shield region of Canada. In Saskatchewan, the Kipahigan Sakahikan 222 Indian reserve is on the northern shores of Kipahigan Lake.

== Kipahigan Lake Dam ==
Kipahigan Lake Dam (55.5054°N 102.0904°W) is at the lake's outflow on the Saskatchewan side of the lake. It is 2.8 metres (9 ft 2 in) high, was built in 1985, and is owned by the Saskatchewan Water Security Agency.

== See also ==
- List of dams and reservoirs in Canada
- List of lakes of Saskatchewan
- List of lakes of Manitoba
