= Kakinagimak Lake =

Lake in Saskatchewan, Canada

- Location in Saskatchewan Kakinagimak Lake (Canada)

- Kakinagimak Lake (centre-right) and surrounding lakes
- Location: Northern Administration District, Saskatchewan
- Coordinates: 55.2001°N 102.2837°W
- Type: Bifurcating lake
- Part of: Churchill River drainage basin; Saskatchewan River drainage; basin
- River sources: Canadian Shield
- Basin countries: Canada
- Max. length: 25 km (16 mi)
- Surface area: 1,835 ha (4,530 acres)
- Average depth: 18 to 25 m (59 to 82 ft)
- Max. depth: 41 m (135 ft)
- Shore length^{1}: 156 km (97 mi)
- Surface elevation: 330 m (1,080 ft)
- Settlements: None
- ^{1} Shore length is not a well-defined measure.

Kakinagimak Lake is a bifurcating lake in the Canadian province of Saskatchewan. The northern part of the lake drains north into the Churchill River drainage basin while the southern part drains into the Wildnest–Sturgeon-Weir River system. The Sturgeon-Weir River is a tributary of the Saskatchewan River. The lake lies in low-relief forested terrain of the Canadian Shield. The climate is sub-arctic.

Kakinagimak Lake is about 45 kilometres (28 mi) north-west of Flin Flon, Manitoba and 40 kilometres (25 mi) east of Pelican Narrows, Saskatchewan. There is a fly-in fishing lodge on the lake.

== Description ==
Kakinagimak Lake is 25 kilometres (16 mi) long, following north-south geological structures, but is narrow like a river. The lake surface is about 330 metres (1,080 ft) above sea level. It has an average depth of 18 to 25 metres (59 to 82 ft) and a maximum depth of 41 metres (135 ft) The shoreline measures about 156 kilometres (97 mi) long.

The northern part of Kakinagimak Lake drains northward into the Churchill River via Nemei Lake, Tocher Lake, and the Nemei River. The southern part of Kakinagimak Lake drains south into the Wildnest–Sturgeon-Weir River system, then into the Saskatchewan River.

Granitoid ridges near the lake rise to about 410 metres (1,350 ft) above sea level. Most of the region is underlain by granodiorite to tonalite gneisses, which are exposed on the shores of the central portion of the lake.

== Environment ==
The lake is in the subarctic climate zone. The annual average temperature is −2 °C (28 °F). The warmest month is July, when the average temperature is 17 °C (63 °F) and the coldest is January, with −21 °C (−6 °F). The lake is surrounded by coniferous forest.

== Fish species ==
Fish commonly found in Kakinagimak Lake include northern pike, walleye, cisco, lake whitefish, and lake trout.

== See also ==
- List of lakes of Saskatchewan
