= Opawikusehikan Narrows =

Strait in Saskatchewan, Canada

Opawikusehikan Narrows Pelican Narrows
- Map showing Pelican Lake and Mirond Lake

- Location of narrows in Saskatchewan Opawikusehikan Narrows (Canada)

Location
- Country: Canada
- Province: Saskatchewan

Physical characteristics
- Source: Pelican Lake
  - location: Pelican Narrows 184B
  - coordinates: 55.16011°N 102.9063°W
  - elevation: 310 m (1,020 ft)
- Mouth: Mirond Lake
  - location: Northern Saskatchewan Administration District
  - coordinates: 55.1569°N 102.8619°W
  - elevation: 310 m (1,020 ft)
- Length: 3.4 km (2.1 mi)

Basin features
- River system: Sturgeon-Weir River

Opawikusehikan Narrows, also known as Pelican Narrows, is a strait in the Canadian province of Saskatchewan that connects Pelican Lake to Mirond Lake. Opawikusehikan Narrows is Cree for "The Narrows of Fear". Along the north-western shore is the Pelican Narrows 184B Indian reserve. The two lakes that the narrows connect are within the Sturgeon-Weir River drainage basin. The Sturgeon-Weir is a tributary of the Saskatchewan River.

Highway 135 traverses the narrows via an island in the strait and two short bridges. The highway across the narrows is an important link as it connects the village of Pelican Narrows and other northern communities to the Hanson Lake Road and the rest of the province.

== Fish species ==
Fish species found in Opawikusehikan Narrows include northern pike and walleye.

== See also ==
- Geography of Saskatchewan
- Hudson Bay drainage basin
