= Pelican Lake (Saskatchewan) =

Lake in Saskatchewan, Canada

- Location in Saskstchewan Pelican Lake (Canada)

- Pelican Lake (top left)
- Location: Northern Administration District, Saskatchewan
- Coordinates: 55.1419°N 103.0042°W
- Part of: Saskatchewan River drainage basin
- Primary inflows: Deschambault Lake; Jan Lake
- Primary outflows: Opawikusehikan Narrows
- Basin countries: Canada
- Surface area: 9,937.5 ha (24,556 acres)
- Shore length^{1}: 357.71 km (222.27 mi)
- Surface elevation: 311 m (1,020 ft)
- Islands: Richardson Island
- Settlements: Pelican Narrows
- ^{1} Shore length is not a well-defined measure.

Pelican Lake is a lake in the Northern Administration District of the Canadian Province of Saskatchewan. The lake is situated in Canada's boreal forest. While there are several lakes and small rivers that flow into Pelican Lake, there are two main inflows. At the lake's southern end, a channel flows in from the west from Deschambault Lake. North-east of that, another channel flows in from the east from Jan Lake. Its outflow is through Opawikusehikan Narrows (also known as Pelican Narrows), near the village of Pelican Narrows, into Mirond Lake. Pelican lake is in the Sturgeon-Weir River drainage basin. The Sturgeon-Weir River is a tributary of the Saskatchewan River.

Access to Pelican Lake and its amenities is from Highway 135.

== See also ==
- List of lakes of Saskatchewan
