= Iskwatikan Lake =

Lake in Saskatchewan, Canada

- Location in Saskatchewan Iskwatikan Lake (Canada)
- Location: Lac La Ronge Provincial Park, Saskatchewan
- Coordinates: 55.3667°N 104.4004°W
- Type: Glacial lake
- Part of: Churchill River drainage basin
- Primary inflows: Rapid River
- Primary outflows: Rapid River
- Basin countries: Canada
- Max. length: 13 km (8 mi)
- Surface area: 4,088.5 ha (10,103 acres)
- Max. depth: 23.1 m (76 ft)
- Shore length^{1}: 134.1 km (83.3 mi)
- Surface elevation: 354 m (1,161 ft)
- Islands: Hickson Island; Abram Island; O'Brien Island; Bettin Island; Penner Island; Hopton Island; George Island
- Settlements: None
- ^{1} Shore length is not a well-defined measure.

Iskwatikan Lake is a glacial lake in the Canadian province of Saskatchewan entirely within Lac La Ronge Provincial Park. It is about 63 kilometres (39 mi) east-north-east from La Ronge. Iskwatikan is Cree for "left over". The lake is along the course of the Rapid River within the Churchill River drainage basin. Upstream is Lac la Ronge and downstream is Nistowiak Falls and Nistowiak Lake — which is a lake along the course of the Churchill River. Access to Iskwatikan Lake is by boat or float plane.

Iskwatikan Lake Lodge is a fly-in fishing lodge on Hickson Island near Iskwatikan Lake's outflow. The lodge has modern cabins and 16-foot, 20 horse boats.

== Description ==
Iskwatikan Lake is an irregularly shaped lake with many islands, bays, and peninsulas. The lake is about 13 kilometres (8 mi) long and covers an area of 4,088.5 hectares (10,103 acres). It is along the course of Rapid River, which begins to the south at Lac la Ronge Dam and flows through Hale Lake and into Iskwatikan Lake. Rapid River flows out of the lake at the northern end over the Nistowiak Falls and Fisher Rapids.

== GeoMemorial Commemorative Naming Program ==
The GeoMemorial Commemorative Naming Program is a program that names geographical features in honour of those who lost their lives in the service of Canada. There are several features related to Iskwatikan Lake named through this program.

- Hickson Island — John William Hickson
- George Island — Alan Baldwin George
- Penner Island — Isaac Abraham Penner
- Reed Peninsula — Howard Murray Reed
- MacPherson Bay — Ian Edgar MacPherson
- Stewart Bay — James Murray Stewart

== Fish species ==
Fish commonly found in Iskwatikan Lake include walleye, lake trout, northern pike, cisco, lake whitefish, burbot, and white sucker.

== See also ==
- List of lakes of Saskatchewan
