= Amisk Lake =

Lake in Saskatchewan, Canada

- Beaver Lake
- Location in Saskatchewan Amisk Lake (Canada)

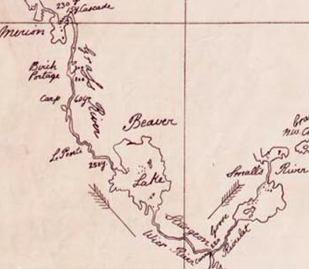
- Detail of David Thompson's 1814 map of Beaver Lake
- Location: Northern Administration District, Saskatchewan
- Coordinates: 54°34′N 102°14′W
- Lake type: Glacial lake
- Part of: Saskatchewan River drainage basin
- Primary inflows: Sturgeon-Weir River (West Weir)
- Primary outflows: Sturgeon-Weir River (South Weir)
- Basin countries: Canada
- Surface area: 45,307.5 ha (111,957 acres)
- Surface elevation: 293 m (961 ft)
- Islands: Lookout Island; Carpenter Island; Iskwasoo Island; Ing Island; Newfoundland Island; Missi Island; Crater Island; Vances Island
- Settlements: Denare Beach

Location of Amisk Lake on the fur trade route from Lake Winnipeg to Lake Athabasca

Amisk Lake is a lake in the east-central part of the Canadian province of Saskatchewan, about 22 kilometres (14 mi) south-west of Flin Flon, Manitoba. Amisk is Cree for "beaver". Along the lake's shores is the community of Denare Beach, a provincial recreation site with lake access and camping, and prehistoric limestone crevices. Access to the lake and its amenities is from Highway 167. Amisk Lake was on an important fur trade route in the 18th century.

== Forts ==
Amisk Lake is along the course of the Sturgeon-Weir River, an important part of the canoe route from eastern Canada to the rich Lake Athabasca country. There was an independent trading post on Amisk Lake (Beaver Lake) in 1775 and a Hudson's Bay Company trading post in 1776.

=== Frobisher-Henry Fort ===
In June 1775, Alexander Henry the elder left Montreal with 16 canoes and goods worth £3,000. On Lake Winnipeg, he was joined by Peter Pond, Joseph Frobisher, and Thomas Frobisher. From the new Hudson's Bay Company post at Cumberland Lake, Henry and the two Frobishers went north up the Sturgeon-Weir hoping to reach Frog Portage where Thomas had traded successfully the previous year. They crossed Amisk Lake on 1 November and the next morning it was frozen over. Since there was good fishing they stopped at the mouth of the West Weir and built a fort. On 1 January, Henry set out on foot and spent three months visiting the Indians. Next spring they went north to Frog Portage and were successful in trade. Joseph Frobisher maintained the post of Amisk Lake until it was abandoned in 1778.

== Recreation sites ==
=== Amisk Lake Recreation Site ===
Amisk Lake Recreation Site (54.6845°N 102.0773°W) is a provincial recreation site on the eastern shore of Amisk Lake. The park is divided into two sections. The Sand Beach campground is located at the south-east corner of the lake and has a campground with 12 campsites and lake access. At the north-eastern corner of the lake, just north of Denare Beach, is Sawmill Bay Campground. Sawmill Bay also has lake access and includes 27 campsites. Both sites are accessed from Highway 167.

=== Meridian Creek Recreation Site ===
Meridian Creek Recreation Site (54.5392°N 102.1352°W) is a 47-hectare (120-acre) rest area and campground with no services on the eastern shore of Amisk Lake. Access is from Highway 167. Meridian Creek flows through the southern end of the park.

== Fish species ==
The fish species include walleye, yellow perch, northern pike, lake trout, lake whitefish, cisco, white sucker, longnose sucker, and burbot.

== See also ==
- List of lakes of Saskatchewan
- Tourism in Saskatchewan
