= Sturgeon-Weir River =

River in Saskatchewan, Canada

Sturgeon-Weir River Riviere Maligne
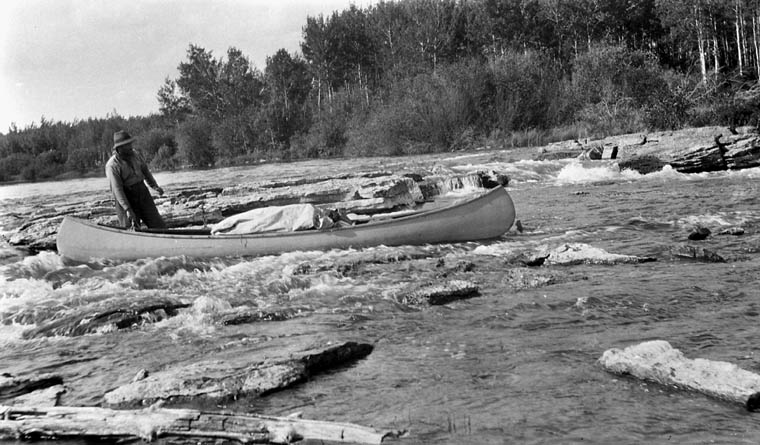
- A canoe navigating the rapids on the Sturgeon-Weir River

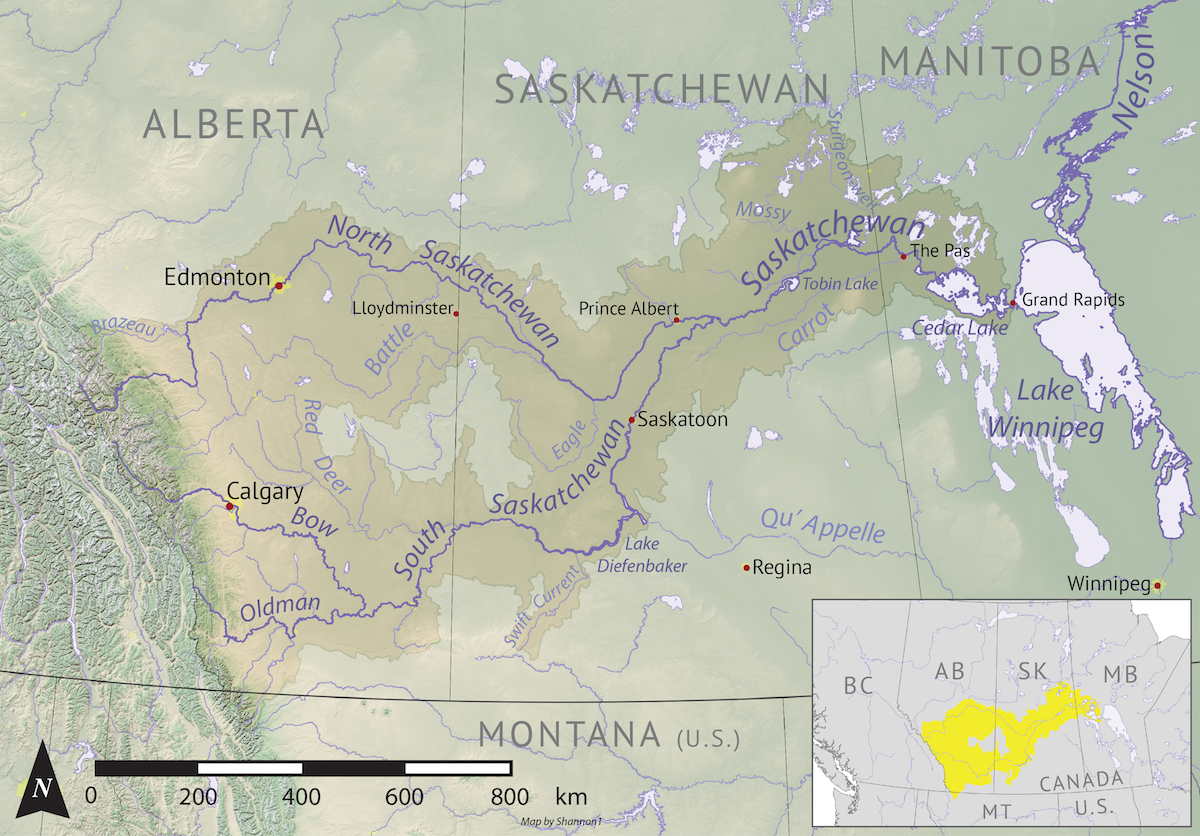
- Map of the Saskatchewan River drainage basin

- Location of the mouth of the Sturgeon-Weir River in Saskatchewan. Sturgeon-Weir River (Canada)

Location
- Country: Canada
- Province: Saskatchewan

Physical characteristics
- Source: Corneille Lake (from Mirond Lake)
  - location: Northern Administration District, Saskatchewan
  - coordinates: 55°01′3″N 102°38′9″W
  - elevation: 311 m (1,020 ft)
- Mouth: Namew Lake
  - coordinates: 54°16′23″N 101°49′01″W
  - elevation: 266 m (873 ft)
- Length: 131 km (81 mi)

Basin features
- River system: Nelson River
- Tributaries
  - left: Wildnest River; Goose River
  - right: Morton River; Foy Creek
- Waterbodies: Amisk Lake
- Waterfalls: Scoop Rapids

Sturgeon-Weir River is a river in east-central Saskatchewan, Canada. It flows about 130 kilometres (81 mi) south-southeast to join the Saskatchewan River at Cumberland Lake. It was on the main voyageur route from eastern Canada northeast to the Mackenzie River basin. The river is a popular wilderness canoe route in Canada.

== Description ==
The Sturgeon-Weir River's source is Corneille Lake, which is connected to Mirond Lake at the Corneille Rapids. The community of Pelican Narrows is upstream at Opawikusehikan Narrows, which connects Mirond Lake and Pelican Lake. From Corneille Lake, the Sturgeon-Weir River travels south-east, crossing Highway 106 before reaching Amisk Lake. It then continues south-easterly to Sturgeon Landing and Namew Lake.

Sturgeon-Weir River drains a large system of lakes between latitudes 54°30' and 55°30' and longitudes 102° and 103°, including Deschambault Lake, Wood Lake, Attitti Lake, Jan Lake, Pelican Lake, and Mirond Lake. It empties into Amisk Lake, about 140 kilometres (87 mi) north-west of The Pas, Manitoba. The river is about 80 kilometres (50 mi) long from Mirond Lake to Amisk Lake. Above Scoop Rapids, about halfway along the river, the drainage area is about 14,710 km^{2} (5,678 sq mi).

The river runs through the Churchill River Uplands ecoregion which is located along the southern edge of the Precambrian Shield. The area contains continuous coniferous and boreal forest, consisting of closed stands of black spruce and jack pine and a ground cover of mosses and lichens. Local relief rarely exceeds 25 metres (82 ft), but there are ridged steeply sloping rocky uplands and lowlands with exposed bedrock throughout. Wildlife includes barren-ground caribou, moose, black bear, lynx, wolf, beaver, muskrat, red-backed vole, and snowshoe hare. Bird species include raven, common loon, spruce grouse, bald eagle, Canada jay, hawk-owl, and waterfowl, including ducks and geese. Trapping, hunting, fishing, and tourism are occasional uses of land in this region.

== History ==
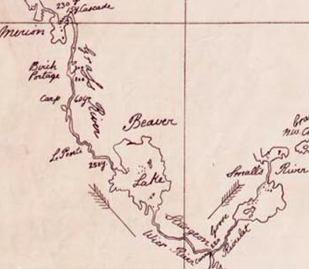
Detail of Thompson's 1814 map showing the Sturgeon Weir

The river is a historically important route connecting the Saskatchewan and Churchill River systems. It has been used since prehistoric times and archeological digs have uncovered pottery dating to 1100 CE. The first European to explore the river may have been Hudson's Bay Company fur trader Isaac Batt in the winter of 1766–67. In 1776, Alexander Henry with Joseph Frobisher, Thomas Frobisher, and J. B. Cadotte travelled up the river from Cumberland House and established a fort at the river's outlet from Amisk Lake, called Fort Beaver Lake. This became the preferred fur trade route connecting the Saskatchewan River system to northern Canada. It linked the important trading posts of Cumberland House to the Frog Portage, Île-à-la-Crosse and eventually Lake Athabasca. However, its steep gradient (about 4 feet per mile) led voyageurs to call it the Rivière Maligne or "Bad River". A traveller in the early 19th century recorded "This river is most appropriately named by the Canadians; for I believe, for its length, it is the most dangerous, cross-grained piece of navigation in the Indian country." The explorer Sir Alexander Mackenzie described it as "an almost continual rapid".

In 1779 Philip Turnor was the first to note it on a map as a "river leading northward and upon the back of the Churchill." Its route was first recorded (unnamed) on an Aaron Arrowsmith map published in 1802. David Thompson recorded its length and named it "Sturgeon Weir River" in his 1814 map of the North-West Territory.

== See also ==
- List of rivers of Saskatchewan
