= Pelican Narrows, Saskatchewan =

Village in Saskatchewan, Canada

Pelican Narrows ᐅᐹᐏᑯᐢᒋᑲᓂᕽ opâwikoscikanihk
- Northern village
- Surrounding lakes

- Location of Pelican Narrows in Saskatchewan Pelican Narrows (Canada)
- Coordinates: 55°11′18″N 102°56′03″W
- Country: Canada
- Province: Saskatchewan
- District: Northern Administration District
- Census Division: 18
- Post office established: 1949

Area (2021)
  - Northern village: 2.40 km^{2} (0.93 sq mi)
- Elevation (airport): 385 m (1,264 ft)

Population (2021)
  - Northern village: 123
  - Northern village density: 51.3/km^{2} (133/sq mi)
- Time zone: UTC−06:00 (CST)
  - Summer (DST): UTC−05:00 (CDT)
- Postal code: S0P 0E0

Pelican Narrows (Woods Cree: ᐅᐹᐏᑯᐢᒋᑲᓂᕽ, romanized: opâwikoscikanihk, lit. 'The Narrows of Fear') is a northern village in the boreal forest of central Saskatchewan, Canada. Its location is on Pelican Lake about 120 km (75 mi) northwest of Creighton by the Hanson Lake Road and Highway 135.

The community is northwest of the Opawikusehikan Narrows that join Mirond and Pelican Lakes, which lie between the Sturgeon-Weir and Churchill River systems. Pelican Narrows is the administrative headquarters for the Peter Ballantyne Cree Nation, a member of the Prince Albert Grand Council, and the majority of the townsite is reserve land. The community consists of the Northern Village of Pelican Narrows and Pelican Narrows 184B and Pelican Narrows 206 Indian Reserve. Together they formed a population centre of about 2,133 people in 2021.

== History ==
The Cree settlement dates from at least 1730. It was an area of trade for the Hudson's Bay and North West companies. In 1874, the Hudson's Bay Company established a permanent post at Pelican Narrows. This became a Northern Store in 1987 which remains open to this day.

Roman Catholic missionaries were traversing the area from the mid-19th century and established a permanent mission in 1878. Anglican missionaries arrived in the late 1890s and built a church in 1911. Schoolchildren were sent away for a number of years.

In 1967, an all-weather road was built into the community and other services followed.

== Demographics ==
In the 2021 Canadian census conducted by Statistics Canada, the Northern Village of Pelican Narrows had a population of 123 living in 30 of its 34 total private dwellings, a change of −30.9% from its 2016 population of 178. With a land area of 2.4 km^{2} (0.93 sq mi), it had a population density of 51.3/km^{2} (132.7/sq mi) in 2021.

Pelican Narrows (population centre) with a population of 2,133 consists of the Northern Village of Pelican Narrows with 123 people and Pelican Narrows 184B, a reserve of the Peter Ballantyne Cree Nation with 1,837 people.

2,460 people identified Cree as their mother tongue in 2011.

== Crime ==
In 2026, the community suffered an outbreak of violence, with two homicides and a shooting at a health clinic within three weeks.

== Infrastructure ==
- Pelican Narrows Airport is located 10 nautical miles (19 km; 12 mi) north-northeast of Pelican Narrows.
- Napoleon Merasty Memorial Arena features an ice rink and a fitness centre.
- Angelique Canada Health Center

== Events ==
An annual walleye fishing derby takes place every year in July. Every year, an event known as "Annual Pelican Narrows Winter Festival" takes place. Currently, as of 2023, the Winter Festival has taken place from February 27th to March 12th.

== Education ==
Schools include the Wapanacak Elementary School and the Wapawikoscikan School (Opawikoscikan Community School) which is home of the Tawowikamik Public Library.

== See also ==
- List of villages in Saskatchewan
