= Creighton, Saskatchewan =

Creighton
- Northern town
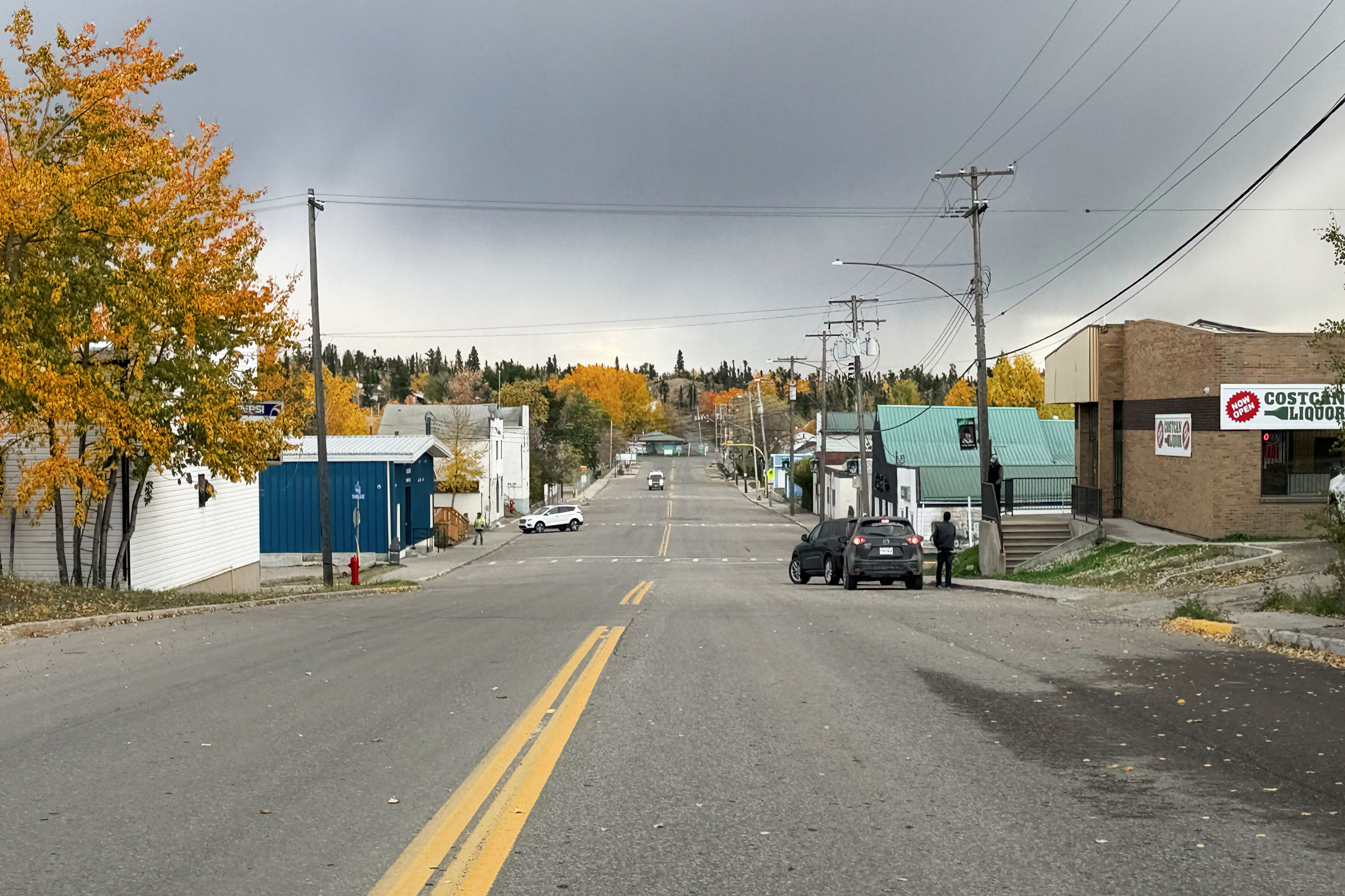

- Location within Saskatchewan
- Coordinates: 54°45′21.96″N 101°53′50.36″W
- Country: Canada
- Province: Saskatchewan
- District: Northern Saskatchewan Administration District

Population (2021)
  - Total: 1,203
  - Summer (DST): UTC-5 (CDT, or officially Manitoba Time, MBT)
- Climate: Dfc

Creighton is a northern town in the Canadian province of Saskatchewan, named after Thomas Creighton. It had a 2021 census population of 1,203 inhabitants, down 14% from 1,402 inhabitants in 2016.

The town lies beside the Saskatchewan–Manitoba border, adjacent to Flin Flon. Due to the proximity between these two communities, there is a high level of cross-border service sharing.

One of the most frequently accessed services of Flin Flon is the Flin Flon General Hospital Ambulance Service. Due to the small population of Creighton, the Government of Saskatchewan permits its residents in Creighton, Denare Beach, Sandy Bay, and Pelican Narrows to use the basic and emergency medical services of Flin Flon. The nearest Saskatchewan medical centre is in Prince Albert, 300 kilometres southwest of Creighton. In addition, though not legally exempted, Creighton and neighbouring Denare Beach informally observe daylight saving time despite Saskatchewan's prohibition on its official use, thus keeping in sync with the community that is its primary public service resource. Flin Flon's radio and TV outlets are available in Creighton.

Northlands College maintains a campus in Creighton. Their main school is Creighton Community School and students from Creighton and Denare Beach attend school there. It is Pre-K - 12.

== Demographics ==
In the 2021 Canadian census conducted by Statistics Canada, Creighton had a population of 1,203 living in 552 of its 610 total private dwellings, a change of −15.8% from its 2016 population of 1,429. With a land area of 12.92 km^{2} (4.99 sq mi), it had a population density of 93.1/km^{2} (241.2/sq mi) in 2021.

Historical population
| Year | Pop. | ±% |
|---|---|---|
| 1961 | 1,729 | — |
| 1991 | 1,668 | −3.5% |
| 1996 | 1,713 | +2.7% |
| 2001 | 1,556 | −9.2% |
| 2006 | 1,502 | −3.5% |
| 2011 | 1,498 | −0.3% |
| 2016 | 1,402 | −6.4% |
| 2021 | 1,203 | −14.2% |

Visible minorities and Aboriginal population
| Canada 2006 Census | | Population | % of Total Population |
|---|---|---|---|
| Visible minority group Source: | South Asian | 10 | 0.7 |
| Visible minority group Source: | Chinese | 10 | 0.7 |
| Visible minority group Source: | Black | 0 | 0 |
| Visible minority group Source: | Filipino | 0 | 0 |
| Visible minority group Source: | Latin American | 0 | 0 |
| Visible minority group Source: | Southeast Asian | 0 | 0 |
| Visible minority group Source: | Arab | 0 | 0 |
| Visible minority group Source: | West Asian | 0 | 0 |
| Visible minority group Source: | Korean | 0 | 0 |
| Visible minority group Source: | Japanese | 0 | 0 |
| Visible minority group Source: | Mixed visible minority | 0 | 0 |
| Visible minority group Source: | Other visible minority | 10 | 0.7 |
| Total visible minority population | | 15 | 1 |
| Aboriginal group Source: | First Nations | 110 | 7.3 |
| Aboriginal group Source: | Métis | 130 | 8.7 |
| Aboriginal group Source: | Inuit | 0 | 0 |
| Total Aboriginal population | | 245 | 16.3 |
| White | | 1,240 | 82.7 |
| Total population | | 1,500 | 100 |

== See also ==
- List of communities in Northern Saskatchewan
- List of communities in Saskatchewan
- List of towns in Saskatchewan
