= Churchill River (Hudson Bay) =

River in Western Canada

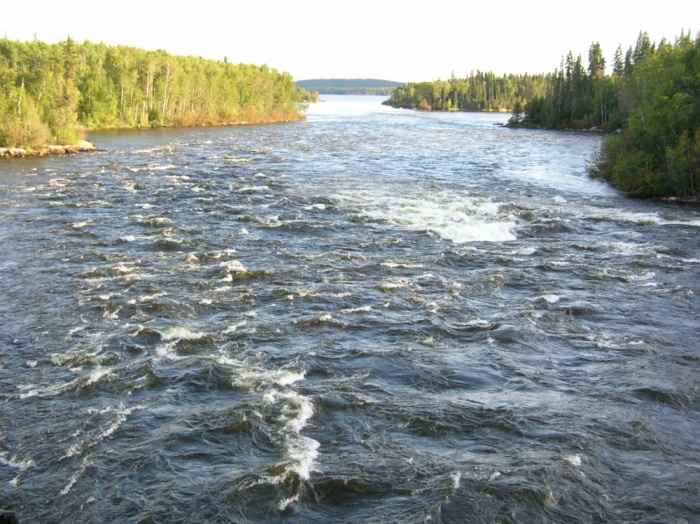
- Otter Rapids (Churchill River)

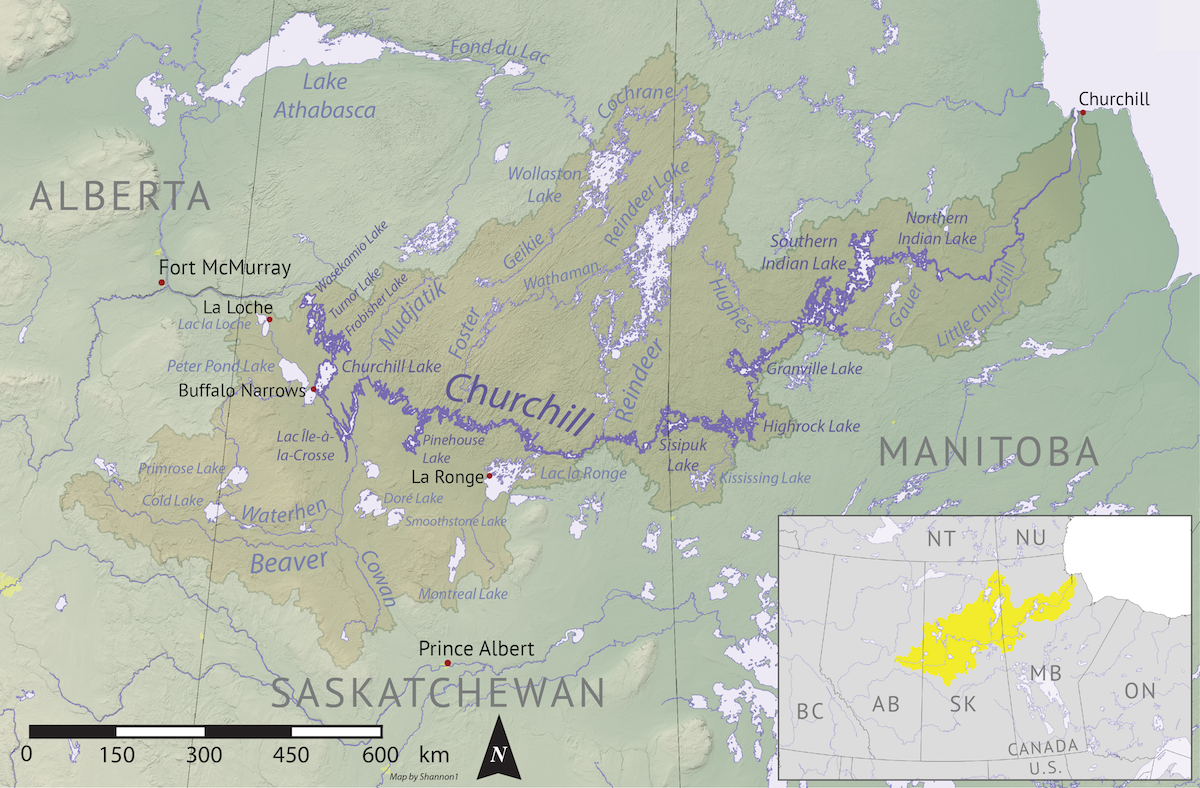
- Churchill River Basin in Canada

- Location of the mouth Churchill River (Hudson Bay) (Canada)
- Etymology: Named after John Churchill, 1st Duke of Marlborough
- Native name: Missinipi (Cree); des nëdhë́ (Chipewyan)

Location
- Country: Canada
- Provinces: Saskatchewan; Manitoba

Physical characteristics
- Source: Churchill Lake
  - location: Saskatchewan
  - coordinates: 56°6′22″N 108°14′46″W
  - elevation: 412 m (1,352 ft)
- Mouth: Hudson Bay
  - location: Manitoba
  - coordinates: 58°47′45″N 94°12′15″W
  - elevation: 0 m (0 ft)
- Length: 1,609 km (1,000 mi)
- Basin size: 281,300 km^{2} (108,600 sq mi)
- Discharge
  - average: 1,200 m^{3}/s (42,000 cu ft/s)

Basin features
- Tributaries
  - left: Foster River; Whitefish River; Reindeer River
  - right: Beaver River; Smoothstone River; Rapid River; Nemei River
- Waterbodies: Lac Île-à-la-Crosse; Pinehouse Lake; Black Bear Island Lake; Otter Lake; Sokatisewin Lake; Southern Indian Lake
- Waterfalls: Kettle Falls; Putatawagan Falls

The Churchill River (French: Rivière Churchill) is a major river in Saskatchewan and Manitoba, Canada. From the head of the Churchill Lake it is 1,609 kilometres (1,000 mi) long. It was named after John Churchill, 1st Duke of Marlborough and governor of the Hudson's Bay Company from 1685 to 1691. The Cree name for the river is Missinipi, meaning "big waters". The Denesuline name for the river is des nëdhë́, meaning "Great River".

The river is located entirely within the Canadian Shield. The drainage basin includes a number of lakes in Central-East Alberta which flow into a series of lakes in Saskatchewan and Manitoba. The main tributary, Beaver River, joins at Lac Île-à-la-Crosse.

Nistowiak Falls — among the tallest falls in Saskatchewan — are on the Rapid River. Rapid River begins at Lac la Ronge, flows through Iskwatikan Lake, and then into Nistowiak Lake along the Churchill, just north of La Ronge.

A large amount of flow of the Churchill River after the Manitoba — Saskatchewan border comes from the Reindeer River, which flows from Wollaston and Reindeer Lakes. Flow from Reindeer Lake is regulated by the Whitesand Dam. From there, the Churchill River flows east through a series of lakes (Highrock, Granville, Southern Indian and Gauer), then flows via a diversion for hydro-electric generation into the Nelson River (60% of flow), and the rest flows as the Churchill River into Hudson Bay at Churchill, Manitoba (see also Nelson River Hydroelectric Project).

== History ==
The Churchill formed a major part of the "voyageur highway" in the 18th to 20th centuries after Dene people showed Peter Pond the Methye Portage which connects the Hudson Bay watershed with the Clearwater — Athabasca — Mackenzie rivers which flow to the Arctic Ocean. See Canadian Canoe Routes (early).

== Fish species ==
The Churchill is also home of several fish species including: walleye, sauger, yellow perch, northern pike, lake trout, lake whitefish, cisco, white sucker, shorthead redhorse, longnose sucker, lake sturgeon, and burbot.

== Hydroelectric developments ==
=== Island Falls ===
The only operating hydroelectric generating station on the Churchill River is Island Falls, with a capacity of 111 megawatts (MW). The purpose of the Whitesand Dam mentioned above is to control the amount of water flowing through Island Falls, since the generating station is downstream of the Reindeer River fork.

=== Wintego Hydroelectric Project ===
In the 1970s, SaskPower was considering building another hydroelectric station on the Churchill River called Wintego. This station would have been located about 23 kilometres (14 mi) downstream of the Reindeer River forks, and 32 kilometres (20 mi) upstream of Island Falls. The project was expected to cost $338 million (equivalent to $1.3 billion in 2020), including transmission and roads, and the capacity of the station would have been 300 MW.

The cost estimate assumes a 50-year lifespan, but the lifespans of SaskPower's other hydroelectric stations have been proven to be much longer (such as 90 years for Island Falls). Construction of Wintego would also enable the output of Island Falls to increase by 70 MW, and this benefit is not included in the cost estimate above.

=== Other Saskatchewan ===
Two other potential hydroelectric developments between the Reindeer River Fork and Island Falls are the Iskwatam Generating Station and the Pita Generating Station, with unknown MW capacities.

=== Manitoba ===
In Manitoba, the Bonald and Granville Falls generating stations could produce 110 MW and 120 MW, respectively.

== Gallery ==
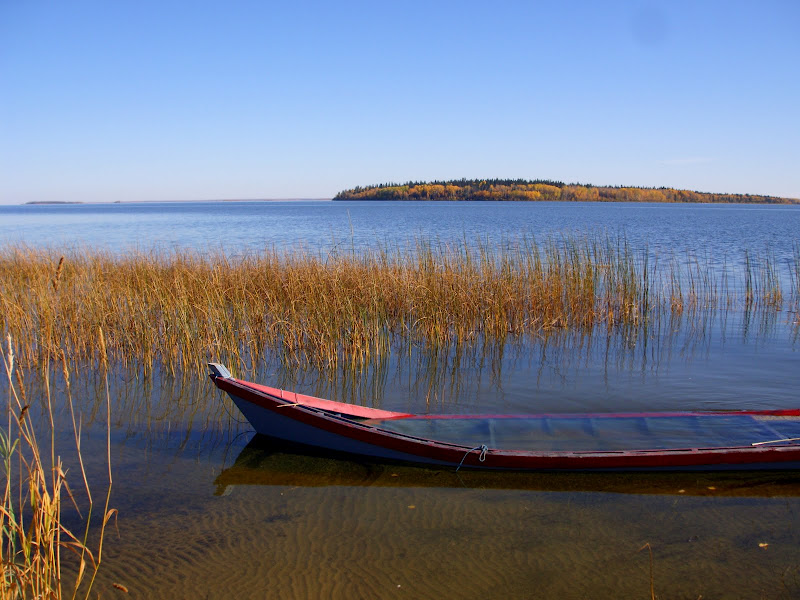
Churchill Lake viewed from Buffalo Narrows

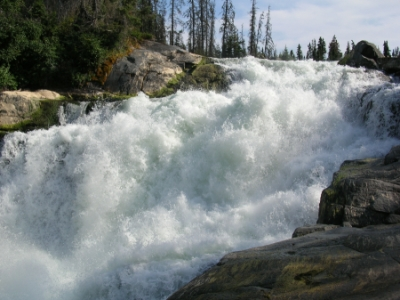
View of upper Nistowiak Falls

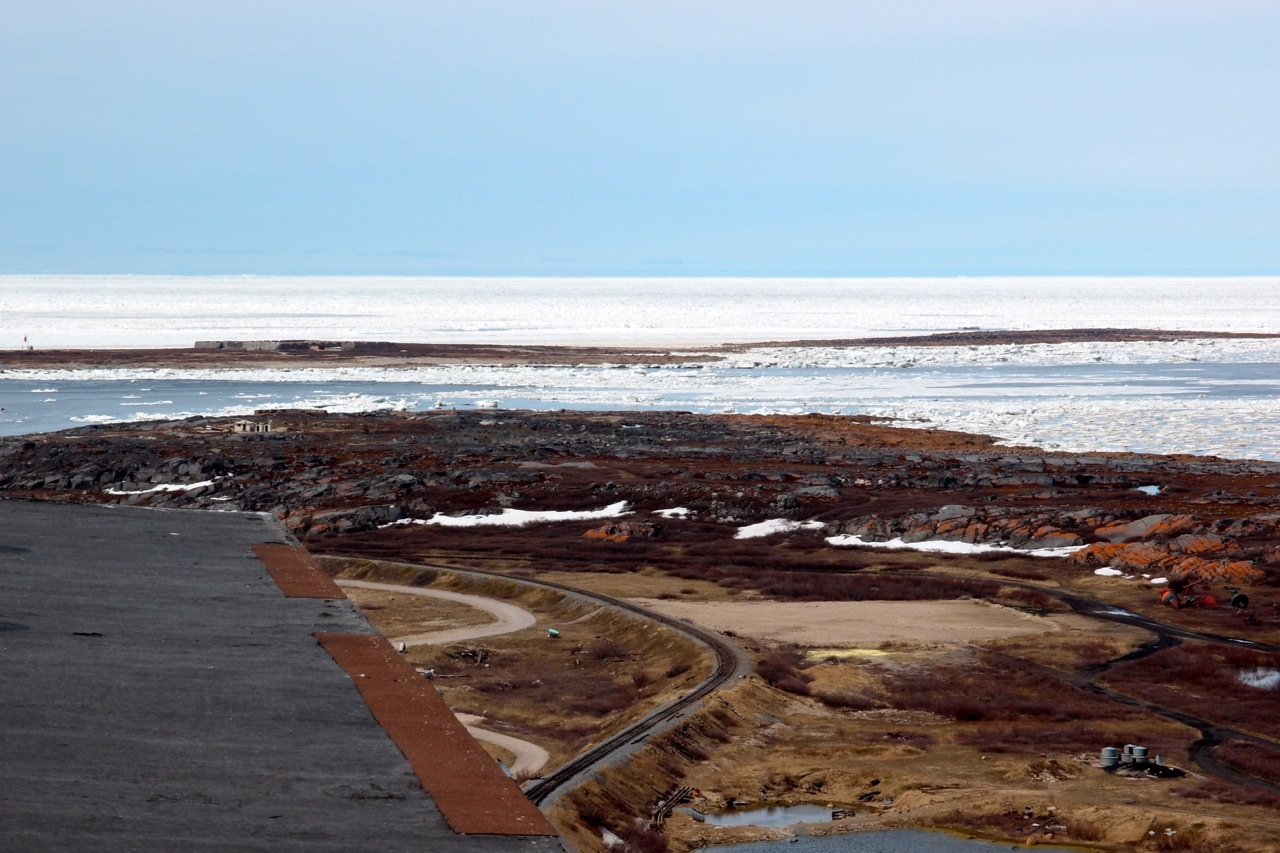
Mouth of the Churchill River at Hudson Bay

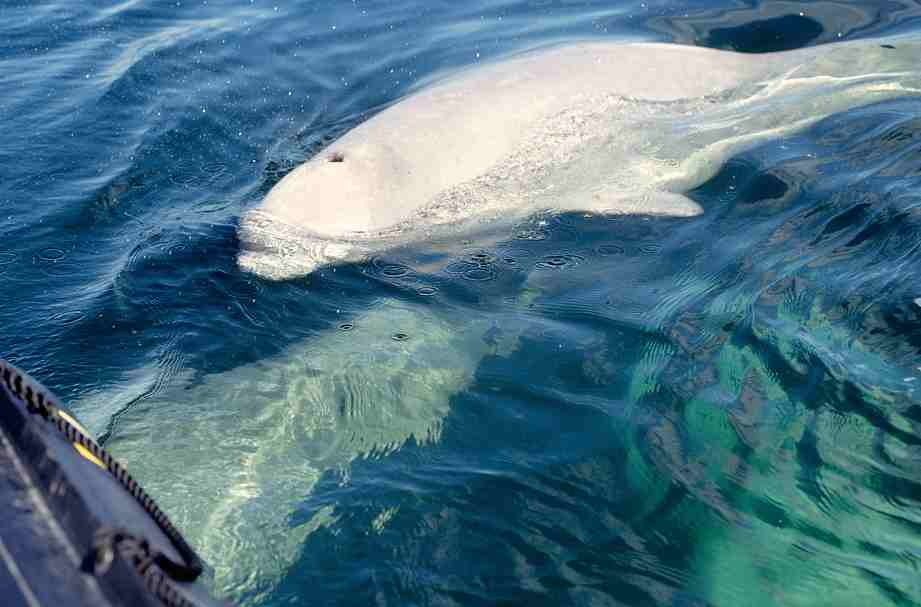
Watching belugas is a popular attraction at the river mouth

== See also ==
- List of rivers of Manitoba
- List of rivers of Saskatchewan
- Hudson Bay drainage basin
- North American fur trade
- List of longest rivers of Canada
