= Chipewyan =

Indigenous people of northwestern Canada

Dënesųłı̨ne
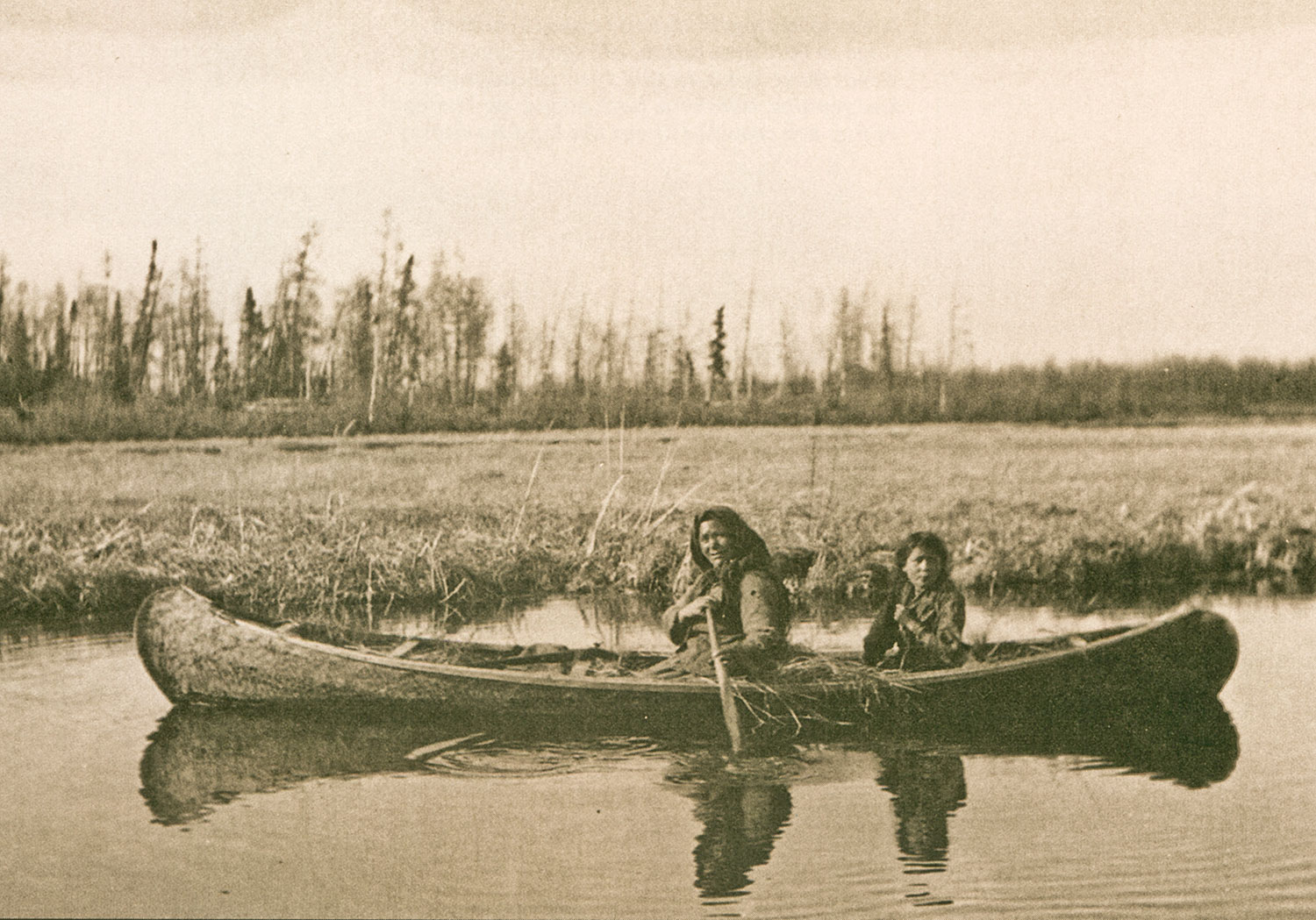
- A Chipewyan woman and child set out to hunt muskrat in Garson Lake, Saskatchewan.

Total population
- 30,910 (2016 census)

Regions with significant populations
- Canada
- Saskatchewan: 12,875
- Northwest Territories: 7,820
- Alberta: 6,350
- Manitoba: 1,905
- British Columbia: 1,225

Languages
- English, Denesuline

Religion
- Christianity, Animism

Related ethnic groups
- Dene, Yellowknives, Tłı̨chǫ, Slavey, Sahtu

The Chipewyan (/ˌtʃɪpəˈwaɪən/ CHIP-ə-WY-ən, also called the Dënesųłı̨né [tènɛ̀sũ̀ɬìné]), are a Dene group of Indigenous Canadian people belonging to the Athabaskan language family, whose ancestors are identified with the Taltheilei Shale archaeological tradition. They are part of the Northern Athabascan group of peoples, and hail from what is now Western Canada.

== Terminology ==
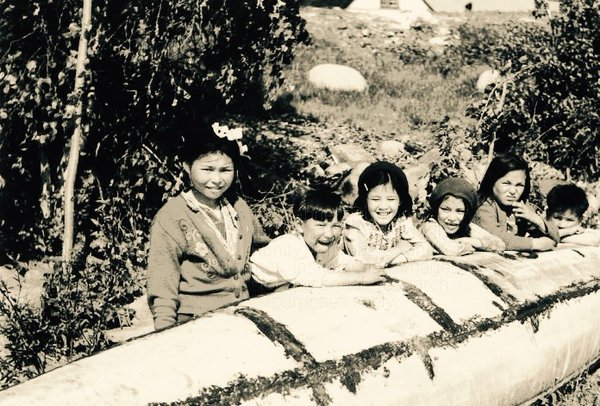
Denesuline children by canoe in La Loche

The name Dënesųłı̨né, also written Denésoliné or Dënë Sųłınë́, means "the original/real people". The term Chipewyan (ᒌᐯᐘᔮᐣ) is an exonym from the Cree language meaning 'pointed hides', referring to the design of their parkas.

The French-speaking missionaries to the northwest of the Red River Colony referred to the Chipewyan people as Montagnais in their documents written in French. Montagnais simply means 'mountain people' or 'highlanders' in French and has been applied to many unrelated nations across North America over time. For example, the missionaries also referred to the Neenolino Innu of northern Quebec as Montagnais.

== Ethnography ==
Historically, the Denesuline were allied to some degree with the southerly Cree peoples. They warred against Inuit and other Dene peoples to the north of Chipewyan lands.

An important historic Denesuline is Thanadelthur ("Marten Jumping"), a young woman who early in the 18th century helped her people to establish peace with the Cree, and to get involved in the fur trade.

The Sayisi Dene of northern Manitoba are a Chipewyan band notable for hunting migratory caribou. They were historically located at Little Duck Lake and known as the "Duck Lake Dene".

In 1956, the government forcibly relocated them to the port of Churchill on the shore of Hudson Bay and a small village north of Churchill called North Knife River. There they joined other Dene and became members of the "Fort Churchill Chipewyan Band".

In the 1970s, the "Duck Lake Dene" opted for self-reliance, and a return to caribou hunting. They relocated to Tadoule Lake, legally becoming recognized as "Sayisi Dene First Nation (Tadoule Lake, Manitoba)" in the 1990s.

== Culture ==
The Chipewyan used to be largely nomadic, organized into small bands and temporarily lived in tepees. They wore one-piece pants and moccasin outfits. However, their nomadic lifestyle began to erode in 1717 when they encountered English settlers. The Chipewyan subsequently became important in the subarctic trade by exchanging furs and hides for metal tools, guns and cloth.

Caribou historically was a major source of food and materials for clothing and tools. Modern Chipewyan are either fluidly sedentary or semi-nomadic in lifestyle. Many still practice their traditional lifestyle for subsistence including fishing or caribou hunting although this process is modernized with the use of modern nets, tools, transportation and more.

== Language ==
Historical distribution of the Denesuline language

- People: Dënë Sųłinë́ ᑌᓀ ᓱᒼᕄᓀ
- Language: Dënë Sųłinë́ Yatıé ᑌᓀ ᓱᒼᕄᓀ ᔭᕠᐁ
- Country: Dënë Sųłinë́ Nëné, ᑌᓀᓱᐠᒼᕄᓀ ᓀᓀ, Denendeh ᑌᓀᐣᑌᐧ

Denesuline (Chipewyan) speak the Denesuline language, of the Athabaskan linguistic group. Denesuline is spoken by Indigenous peoples in Canada whose name for themselves is a cognate of the word dene ("people"): Denésoliné (or Dënesųłiné). Speakers of the language speak different dialects but understand each other. There is a 'k', t dialect that most people speak. For example, people in Fond du lac, Gąnı kuę́ speak the 'k' and say yaki ku while others who use the 't' say yati tu.

The name Chipewyan is, like many people of the Canadian Prairies, of Algonquian origin. It is derived from the Plains Cree name for them, Cīpwayān (ᒌᐘᔮᐣ), "pointed skin", from cīpwāw (ᒌᐚᐤ), "to be pointed"; and wayān (ᐘᔮᐣ), "skin" or "hide" - a reference to the cut and style of Chipewyan parkas.

Most Chipewyan people now use Dene and Denesuline to describe themselves and their language. The Saskatchewan communities of Fond-du-Lac, Black Lake and Wollaston Lake are a few.

Despite the superficial similarity of the names, the Chipewyan are not related to the Chippewa (Ojibwe) people.

In 2015, Shénë Gahdële-Valpy (Shene Catholique-Valpy at the time), a Chipewyan woman in the Northwest Territories, challenged the territorial government over its refusal to permit her to use the letter ⟨ʔ⟩ in her daughter's name, Sahą́ı̨́ʔą (Sahaiʔa without diacritics). The territory argued that territorial and federal identity documents were unable to accommodate the letter. Sahaiʔa's mother finally registered her name with a hyphen in place of the ⟨ʔ⟩, while continuing to challenge the policy. Shortly afterwards, another woman named Andrea Heron also challenged the territory on the same grounds, for refusing to accept the letter ⟨ʔ⟩ in her daughter's Slavey name, Sakaeʔah (actually a cognate of Sahaiʔa). Náʔël, the sister of Sahą́ı̨́ʔą, faces the same issues.

== Demographics ==
Chipewyan peoples live in the region spanning the western Canadian Shield to the Northwest Territories, including northern parts of the provinces of Manitoba, Alberta and Saskatchewan. There are also many burial and archaeological sites in Nunavut which are part of the Dënesųłı̨ne group.

The following list of First Nations band governments had in August 2016 a total registered membership of 25,519, with 11,315 in Saskatchewan, 6,952 in Alberta, 3,038 in Manitoba and 4,214 in the Northwest Territories. All had Denesuline populations; however, several had a combination of Cree and Denesuline members (see the Barren Lands First Nation in Manitoba and the Fort McMurray First Nation in Alberta).

There are also many Dene (Dënesųlı̨ne)-speaking Métis communities located throughout the region. The Saskatchewan village of La Loche, for example, had 2,300 residents who in the 2011 census identified as speaking Dene (Denesuline) as their native language. About 1,800 of the residents were Métis and about 600 were members of the Clearwater River Dene Nation.

== Commemorations ==
The relocation of the Sayisi Dene is commemorated by the Dene Memorial in Churchill, Manitoba.

== Historical Chipewyan regional groups ==
Villages in Canada with a Denesuline speaking population
15 communities in Canada with Denesuline populations. Flashing dots are villages with over 1,000 speakers.

The Chipewyan moved in small groups or bands, consisting of several extended families, alternating between winter and summer camps. The groups participated in hunting, trapping, fishing and gathering in Canada's boreal forest and around the many lakes of their territory. Later, with the emerging North American fur trade, they organized into several major regional groups in the vicinity of the European trading posts to control, as middleman, the carrying trade in furs and the hunting of fur-bearing animals. The new social groupings also enabled the Chipewyan to dominate their Dene neighbours and to better defend themselves against their rifle-armed Cree enemies, who were advancing to the Peace River and Lake Athabasca.

- Kaí-theli-ke-hot!ínne (K'aı́tëlı́ hót'ı̨ne) ('willow flat-country up they-dwell') lived on the western shore of Lake Athabasca at Fort Chipewyan. Their tribal area extended northward to Fort Smith on the Slave River and south to Fort McMurray on the Athabasca River
- Kés-ye-hot!ínne (K'ësyëhót'ı̨ne) ('aspen house they-dwell' or 'poplar house they-dwell') lived on the upper reaches of the Churchill River, along the Lac Île-à-la-Crosse, Methye Portage, Cold Lake, Heart Lake and Onion Lake. The tribal name is probably a description of adjacent Chipewyan groups for this major regional group and takes literally reference to the Lac Ile à la Crosse established European trading forts which were built with Poplar or Aspen wood.
- Hoteladi Hótthę̈nádé dëne ('northern people') lived north of the Kés-ye-hot!ínne between Cree Lake, west of Reindeer Lake on the south and on the east shore of Lake Athabasca in the north.
- Hâthél-hot!inne (Hátthëlót'ı̨ne) ('lowland they-dwell') lived in the Reindeer Lake (ɂëtthën tué) region which drains south into the Churchill River.
- Etthen eldili dene (Etthén heldélį Dené, Ethen-eldeli - 'Caribou-Eaters') lived in the taiga east of Lake Athabasca far east to Hudson Bay, at Reindeer Lake, Hatchet Lake, Wollaston Lake and Lac Brochet
- Kkrest'ayle kke ottine ('dwellers among the quaking aspens' or 'trembling aspen people') lived in the boreal forests between Great Slave Lake in the south and Great Bear Lake in the north.
- Sayisi Dene (Saı́yısı́ dëne) (or Saw-eessaw-dinneh - 'people of the east') traded at Fort Chipewyan. Their hunting and tribal areas extended between Lake Athabasca and Great Slave Lake, and along the Churchill River.
- Gáne-kúnan-hot!ínne (Gąnı̨ kuę hót'ı̨ne) ('jack-pine home they-dwell') lived in the taiga east of Lake Athabasca and were particularly centred along the eastern Fond-du-Lac area.
- Des-nèdhè-kkè-nadè (Dësnëdhé k'e náradé dëne) (Desnedekenade, Desnedhé hoį́é nadé hot'įnę́ - 'people along the great river') were also known as Athabasca Chipewyan. They lived between Great Slave Lake and Lake Athabasca along the Slave River near Fort Resolution (Denı́nu Kų́ę́ — 'moose Island').
- Thilanottine (Tthı́lą́ne hót'ı̨ne) (Tu tthílá hot'įnę́ — 'those who dwell at the head of the lakes' or 'people of the end of the head') lived along the lakes of the Upper Churchill River area, along the Churchill River and Athabasca River, from Great Slave Lake and Lake Athabasca in the north to Cold Lake and Lac La Biche in the southwest.
- Tandzán-hot!ínne (Tálzą́hót'ı̨ne) ('dwellers at the dirty lake', also known as Dení-nu-eke-tówe - 'moose island up lake-on') lived on the northern shore of Great Slave Lake and along the Yellowknife River, and before their expulsion by the Tłı̨chǫ along the Coppermine River. They were often regarded as a Chipewyan group, but form as "Yellowknives" historically an independent First Nation and called themselves T'atsaot'ine (T'átsąnót'ı̨ne).

== Governance ==
The Dënesųłı̨ne people are part of many band governments spanning Alberta, Saskatchewan, Manitoba and the Northwest Territories.

=== Alberta ===
Denesuline peoples in Alberta
Tribal council	First Nations	Headquarters	Reserves	Area	Population	Notes and references
Athabasca Tribal Council	Athabasca Chipewyan First Nation (K'ai Taile Dené)	Fort Chipewyan (K'aı́tël koę)	Chipewyan 201; Chipewyan 201A; Chipewyan 201B; Chipewyan 201C; Chipewyan 201D; Chipewyan 201E; Chipewyan 201F; Chipewyan 201G	34,767.7 ha 134.239 mi^{2}	1,533	Tribal council, name and HQ, reserves and area, population (February 2025)
Athabasca Tribal Council	Fort McKay First Nation	Fort McKay	Fort McKay 174; Fort McKay 174C; Fort McKay 174D; Namur Lake 174B; Namur River 174A	14,886 ha 57.48 mi^{2}	1,042	Tribal council, name and HQ, reserves and area, population (February 2025)
Athabasca Tribal Council	Chipewyan Prairie First Nation (Tł'ógh tëlı́ dënesųłı̨ne)	Chard	Cowper Lake 194A; Janvier 194; Winefred Lake 194B	3,079.7 ha 11.891 mi^{2}	1,018	Tribal council, name and HQ, reserves and area, population (February 2025)
Athabasca Tribal Council	Fort McMurray First Nation (Tthı̨dłı̨ kuę́)	Fort McMurray	Clearwater 175; Gregoire Lake 176; Gregoire Lake 176A; Gregoire Lake 176B	3,231.7 ha 12.478 mi^{2}	1,153	Tribal council, name and HQ, reserves and area, population (February 2025)
Athabasca Tribal Council	Mikisew Cree First Nation (ᒥᑭᓯᐤ)	Fort Chipewyan (K'aı́tël koę)	Allison Bay 219; Charles Lake 225; Collin Lake 223; Cornwall Lake 224; Devil's Gate 220; Dog Head 218; Old Fort 217; Peace Point 222; Sandy Point 221	5,116.1 ha 19.753 mi^{2}	3,281	Despite the name, the population of this band is mixed with a "little over fifty percent" having Chipewyan ancestry in 2020 according to a former chief, whose own mother was Dene. Name and HQ, reserves and area, population (February 2025)
Tribal Chiefs Ventures Incorporated	Cold Lake First Nations (Łué chógh tué)	Cold Lake	Cold Lake 149; Cold Lake 149A; Cold Lake 149B; Cold Lake 149C; Blue Quills	20,853.4 ha 80.515 mi^{2}	3,347	Tribal council, name and HQ, reserves and area, population (February 2025)
Akaitcho Territory Government (Ɂákéchógh nęnę)	Smith's Landing First Nation (Tthëbátthı́ dënesųłı̨ne)	Fort Smith (Tthebacha)	Ɂejëre Kʼelnı Kuę́ 196I; Hokédhe Kué 196E; Kʼı Kué 196D; Łı̨ Dezé 196C; Tthebacha Náre 196A; Tthebatthıe 196; Tsʼu Kʼadhe Kué 196F; Tsʼu Nedhé 196H; Tsʼu Kué 196G; Tthejëre Ghaı̨lı̨ 196B	20,853.4 ha 80.515 mi^{2}	3,347	Headquarters are in the Northwest Territories but all reserves are in Alberta. Tthebacha meaning "beside the rapids" is the traditional Dene name for Fort Smith. Tribal council, name and HQ, reserves and area, population (February 2025)

=== Manitoba ===
Denesuline peoples in Manitoba
Tribal council	First Nations	Headquarters	Reserves	Area	Population	Notes and references
Keewatin Tribal Council	Barren Lands First Nation (Brochet Kuę́)	Brochet	Brochet 197; Barren Lands Indian Reserve	4,372 ha 16.88 mi^{2}	1,286	They have a Cree and Dene population. Tribal council, name and HQ, reserves and area, population (February 2025)
Keewatin Tribal Council	Northlands Denesuline First Nation (ᓂ ᗂᘚ ᑌᓀ, Nįh hots’į Dene)	Lac Brochet (ᑕᐤᕊ ᕤᐧᐁ, Dahlu T’ua)	Kasmere Lake B Kesinltintúwe; Lac Brochet 197A; Luawaychotuwé; Luwechotuwe Parcel B Luwechotuwe Parcel C Netelituwe Site C Nitelitúwe Site E Nįtxeli Tuwé 1 Nįtxeli Tuwé 2 Nįtxeli Tuwé 4 Putahow Lake Site A Putahow Lake Site B Putahow Lake Site C Putahow Lake Site D Putahow Lake Site F Sheth Chok; Tajabanilin; Tatuwe Chok Indian Reserve; Thai Da Re; Thaí Tuwé 2 Indian Reserve; Thaíchonįlįni Indian Reserve; Thaídaré Indian Reserve; Thi Dare Indian Reserve; Thlewiaza River; Thuycholeeni; Thuycholeeni Azé; Thuycholeeni Lake A Thuycholeeni Lake B Thuycholeeni Lake C Tlock Desi Chiye; Tthekalé Nu; Tu Txanįlįni Indian Reserve; Tł’odįzeché Indian Reserve; Yathie Nitaniah; Łuécho Tuwé 1 Indian Reserve	24,695 ha 95.35 mi^{2}	1,216	Tribal council, name and HQ, reserves and area, population (February 2025)
Keewatin Tribal Council	Sayisi Dene First Nation	Tadoule Lake	Churchill 1	212.1 ha 0.819 mi^{2}	920	Formerly known as Fort Churchill Indian Band. Tribal council, name and HQ, reserves and area, population (February 2025)

=== Northwest Territories ===
Denesuline peoples in the Northwest Territories
Tribal council	First Nations	Headquarters	Reserves / community	Area	Population	Notes and references
Akaitcho Territory Government (Ɂákéchógh nęnę)	Deninu Kųę́ First Nation (Deneh-noo-kweh)	Fort Resolution (Denı́nu Kų́ę́)	Fort Resolution Settlement	0	1,096	Formerly known as Fort Resolution Dene. Denı́nu Kų́ę́ translates as "moose island place" and Deneh-noo-kweh as "People of moose island"' Tribal council, name and HQ, reserves and area, population (February 2025)
Akaitcho Territory Government (Ɂákéchógh nęnę)	Łutsël K'é Dene First Nation	Łutselk'e (Łútsę̀lk'é)	Snowdrift Settlement	0	868	Formerly known as the Snowdrift Band. Łútsę̀lk'é translates as "place of the łútsę̀l", a type of small fish known as a cisco (Coregonus artedi). Tribal council, name and HQ, reserves and area, population (February 2025)
Akaitcho Territory Government (Ɂákéchógh nęnę)	Salt River First Nation#195	Fort Smith (Tthebacha)	Fitzgerald No. 196; Fort Smith Settlement; Salt Plains 195; Salt River No. 195	44,113 ha 170.32 mi^{2}	1,066	Tthebatthıe 196, formerly Fitzgerald No. 196, is located in Alberta. Tribal council, name and HQ, reserves and area, population (February 2025)
Akaitcho Territory Government (Ɂákéchógh nęnę)	Yellowknives Dene First Nation	Yellowknife (Sǫ̀mbak'è)	Dettah Settlement; Ndilo Settlement; Yellowknife Settlement	0	1,720	Sǫ̀mbak'è translates as "money place". Tribal council, name and HQ, reserves and area, population (February 2025)

=== Saskatchewan ===
Denesuline peoples in Saskatchewan
Tribal council	First Nations	Headquarters	Reserves	Area	Population	Notes and references
MLTC Program Services Inc.	Buffalo River Dene Nation (Ɂëjëre dësché)	Dillon	Peter Pond Lake Indian Reserve No. 193	8,259.7 ha 31.891 mi^{2}	1,775	The reserve is about 84 km (52 mi) northwest of Île-à-la-Crosse (Kuę́ ). Tribal council, name and HQ, reserves and area, population (February 2025)
MLTC Program Services Inc.	Clearwater River Dene Nation (Tı̨tëlase tué)	Clearwater River	Clearwater River Dene Band 221; Clearwater River Dene Band 222; Clearwater River Dene Band 223; La Loche Indian Settlement	9,511.1 ha 36.723 mi^{2}	3,246	Tribal council, name and HQ, reserves and area, population (February 2025)
MLTC Program Services Inc.	English River First Nation	Patuanak	Cree Lake 192G; Dipper Rapids 192C; Elak Dase 192A; Barkwell Bay 192I; Beauval Forks 192O; Cable Bay 192M; Cable Bay 192N; Flatstone Lake 192L; Haultain Lake 192K; Leaf Rapids 192P; Mawdsley Lake 192R; Slush Lake 192Q; English River 192H; Grasswoods 192J; Île-à-la-Crosse 192E; Knee Lake 192B; La Plonge 192; Primeau Lake 192F; Wapachewunak 192D	25,270.5 ha 97.570 mi^{2}	1,897	The name originates from the English River where the "poplar house people" (Kés-ye-hot'ı̨në) inhabited the area for periods during the year. Most families, who now reside in Patuanak (Bëghą́nı̨ch'ërë) and La Plonge 192 by Beauval had traditionally lived down river. Tribal council, name and HQ, reserves and area, population (February 2025)
MLTC Program Services Inc.	Birch Narrows Dene Nation (K'ı́t'ádhı̨ká )	Turnor Lake	Turnor Lake 194; Churchill Lake 193A; Turnor Lake 193B	2,902.4 ha 11.206 mi^{2}	997	Tribal council, name and HQ, reserves and area, population (February 2025)
PADC Management Company	Black Lake Denesuline First Nation (Tázën tué)	Black Lake	Chicken 224; Chicken 225; Chicken 226	32,219.7 ha 124.401 mi^{2}	2,352	Tribal council, name and HQ, reserves and area, population (February 2025)
PADC Management Company	Hatchet Lake Denesuline First Nation (Tthëłtué)	Wollaston Lake	Lac la Hache 220	11,020 ha 42.5 mi^{2}	2,054	Tribal council, name and HQ, reserves and area, population (February 2025)
PADC Management Company	Fond du Lac Denesuline First Nation	Fond du Lac	Fond du Lac 227; Fond du Lac 228; Fond du Lac 229; Fond du Lac 231; Fond du Lac 232; Fond du Lac 233	36,812.1 ha 142.132 mi^{2}	2,287	Tribal council, name and HQ, reserves and area, population (February 2025)

== Notable Chipewyans ==
- Matonabbee (Matąnebı́)
- Matooskie
- Thanadelthur (Thánadëltth'ér)
- Louis Riel, who was a grandson of a Chipewyan
- Jimmy Herman, actor from Cold Lake First Nation
- Alex Janvier, artist from Cold Lake First Nation
