= Saskatchewan Highway 165 =

Provincial highway in Saskatchewan, Canada

Highway 165

Route information
- Maintained by Ministry of Highways and Infrastructure
- Length: 291.6 km (181.2 mi)

Major junctions
- West end: Highway 155 near Beauval
- CanAm Highway / Highway 2 south of La Ronge
- East end: Highway 106 near Big Sandy Lake

Location
- Country: Canada
- Province: Saskatchewan

Highway system
- Provincial highways in Saskatchewan
← Highway 155	→ Highway 167

Highway 165 is a provincial highway in Saskatchewan, Canada. It runs from Highway 155 east to Highway 106 and has a 20-kilometre (12 mi) concurrency (overlap) with the CanAm Highway (Highway 2).

Highway 165 runs west to east parallel to the boundary of the Pre-Cambrian shield in northern Saskatchewan. The highway crosses notable rivers such as the Beaver, Montreal, and the Smoothstone. The communities of Sakamayack and Beauval are accessible from the highway. Recreational sites along the highway include Lac la Plonge Campground at the western end of Lac la Plonge and Jayjay Recreation Site at Jayjay Lake near the intersection with Highway 106. The entire route is within the Northern Saskatchewan Administration District. It is about 292 km (181 mi) long.

In 2025, two bridges along Highway 165 near Beauval over the Beaver River were replaced at a cost of about $11.1 million.

== Major intersections ==
From west to east:

Location	km	mi	Destinations	Notes
	0.0	0.0	Highway 155 – Green Lake, La Loche	Hwy 165 western terminus
Beauval	10.7	6.6	Highway 918 north – Patuanak	
	65.8	40.9	Highway 914 north – Pinehouse, Key Lake mine	
	120.0	74.6	Highway 910 north	
	186.2	115.7	Highway 925 west – Dillon	
	137.7	85.6	Highway 935 north – Lac La Ronge First Nation	
	177.3	110.2	Highway 2 south / CanAm Highway – Prince Albert	West end of Hwy 2 concurrency
	197.0	122.4	Highway 2 north / CanAm Highway – La Ronge	East end of Hwy 2 concurrency
	197.6	122.8	Highway 969 south – Timber Bay, Montreal Lake	
	235.3	146.2	Highway 912	
	291.6	181.2	Highway 106 (Hansen Lake Road) – Creighton, Flin Flon, Prince Albert	
1.000 mi = 1.609 km; 1.000 km = 0.621 mi: Concurrency terminus

== See also ==
- Transportation in Saskatchewan
- Roads in Saskatchewan
