= English River First Nation =

First Nation band government

- Band No. 400
- Des Nëdhë́’iné
- People: Denesuline
- Treaty: Treaty 10
- Headquarters: Patuanak
- Province: Saskatchewan

Land
- Main reserve: La Plonge 192
- Reserves: Elak Dase 192A; Knee Lake 192B; Dipper Rapids 192C; Wapachewunak 192D; Île-à-la-Crosse 192E; Primeau Lake 192F; Cree Lake 192G; English River 192H; Barkwell Bay 192I; Grasswoods 192J; Haultain Lake 192K; Flatstone Lake 192L; Cable Bay 192M; Cable Bay 192N; Beauval Forks 192O; Leaf Rapids 192P; Slush Lake 192Q; Mawdsley Lake 192R
- Land area: 252.703 km^{2} (97.569 sq mi)

Population (2019)
- On reserve: 778
- Off reserve: 847
- Total population: 1625

Government
- Chief: Alfred Dawatsare

Tribal Council
- Meadow Lake Tribal Council

The English River Dene Nation is a Dene First Nation band government in Patuanak, Saskatchewan, Canada. The reserve is in the northern section of the province. Its territories are in the boreal forest of the Canadian Shield. This First Nation is a member of the Meadow Lake Tribal Council (MLTC).

Traditionally, English River First Nation are known in Chipewyan (Denesuline) as "People of the Great River" (Des Nëdhë́’iné), referencing Churchill River along its banks their traditional territory is located.

== Demographics ==
As of May 2012 the total membership of English River Dene First Nation was 1,451 with 774 members living on-reserve and 677 members living off-reserve.

== Territory ==
The English River Dene Nation based in Patuanak has territory at fifteen sites.

- Cree Lake 192G on the south-west side of Cree Lake is 1607.40 hectares 57.3848°N 107.0644°W
- Cable Bay 192M on Cree Lake is 538.30 hectares
- Barkwell Bay 192I at the northern end of Cree Lake is 2344 hectares 57.6158°N 106.1000°W One of the two sites at the south end may include the old Cree Lake settlement.
- Wapachewunak 192D is 1967 hectares. 55.9085°N 107.7138°W with 482 residents (Canada Census 2011). It adjoins the northern hamlet of Patuanak
- La Plonge 192 is 9,487.20 hectares (23,443.4 acres) 55°12′34″N 107°35′23″W. The La Plonge settlement where the Beauval Residential School was located is across the river from the northern village of Beauval and had 115 residents in 2011.
- Dipper Rapids 192C is 831.30 hectares (2,054.2 acres) 55°57′07″N 107°22′15.3″W and home of the Dipper Lake settlement where the Churchill River enters Dipper Lake
- Elak Dase 192A 55.8742°N 106.7544°W is 1390.90 hectares on the east side of Knee Lake is home of the Knee Lake settlement at the mouth of the Haultain River. 55.8543°N 106.7762°W
- English River 192H located on an island in Porter Lake is 42.90 hectares. 56.3347°N 107.3358°W
- Beauval Forks 192O 55.1011°N 107.7079°W is 1.40 hectares.
- Flatstone Lake 192L is 230.50 hectares. 56.2502°N 107.7180°W
- Haultain Lake 192K is 201.20 hectares. 56.8334°N 106.3678°W
- Grasswoods 192J 56.3347°N 107.3358°W is 54.4 hectares.
- Île-à-la-Crosse 192E is 5 miles east of Ile a la Crosse at the mouth of the Beaver River on the shore of Lac Île-à-la-Crosse and is 6 hectares.
- Knee Lake 192B (north west shore of Knee Lake) is 487.20 hectares. 55.8613°N 107.0429°W
- Primeau Lake 192F home of the Primeau Lake settlement on Primeau Lake is 1690 hectares. 55.8946°N 107.2429°W

== Notable members ==
- Sage Paul, fashion designer

== See also ==
- Denesuline language
- Denesuline
