= Beauval =

Beauval is the name of a communes of France:

- Beauval, Somme, in the Somme département

a town in Canada

- Beauval, Saskatchewan, in Saskatchewan province

and a Canadian Indian Residential School

- Beauval Indian Residential School
