= Sage Paul =

First Nations fashion designer from Canada

- Born: Toronto
- Citizenship: English River First Nation, Canada
- Education: Fashion Techniques & Design diploma, George Brown College, 2006
- Occupations: Executive Director Curator & Creative Director Designer & Artist
- Years active: 2004-present
- Employer: Indigenous Fashion Arts
- Board member of: Toronto Arts Foundation

Sage Paul is a Denesuliné and Canadian fashion designer who uses fashion design to promote Indigenous cultures. She co-founded and serves as executive and artistic Director of the nonprofit organization Indigenous Fashion Arts.

== Early life and education ==
Sage Paul was born in Toronto, where she and her siblings grew up. Sage's mother is a fourth-generation Canadian settler of Hungarian and British ancestry. Her father, Simon Paul, is Dene from English River First Nation and a former student of the Beauval Indian Residential School. Paul is a descendent of the 1906 Treaty 10 signing between English River First Nation and the government of Canada.

In 2004, Paul interned at the imagineNATIVE Film + Media Arts Festival. She continued to work for the festival in events and marketing until 2013.

In 2006, Paul earned a diploma in Fashion Techniques and Design from George Brown College.

== Career ==
Paul's work in the fashion industry includes and creating platforms for Indigenous designers and artists. In 2011, she self-presented her first collection entitled "End of Summer" and the following year she began experimenting with multi-disciplinary, conceptual and collaborative approaches in fashion performance, bringing together Indigenous artists in fashion, craft, dance, and music, to present her collection "Synaptic City." That collection subsequently exhibited at Harbourfront Centre's 2012 Planet IndigenUs festival.

In 2014, Paul co-founded Setsuné Indigenous Fashion Incubator. Setsuné means "My grandmother" in the Dene language. She and her collaborators created programming to sustain traditional Indigenous practices in fashion like hide tanning, beading, quilling, and sewing. In 2016, the Incubator partnered with Ikea Canada to design and produce the collection ÅTERSTÄLLA, which means to restore, heal, or redecorate, and it was made entirely from salvaged Ikea textiles, reflecting the traditional Indigenous value to "use everything."

Later in 2016, Paul began to conceive an Indigenous fashion week. By spring 2018, she and her co-founders, Kerry Swanson and Heather Haynes, formed an artist collective and launched Indigenous Fashion Week Toronto (IFWTO) at Harbourfront Centre in Toronto. IFWTO was met with great acclaim from audiences, media and Indigenous communities, including a special reception hosted by the Lieutenant Governor Elizabeth Dowdeswell at Queens Park to mark the occasion.

In November 2020, IFWTO was registered as a nonprofit organization called Indigenous Fashion Arts (IFA). Paul was appointed to lead the organization as Executive & Artistic Director, where she continues to explore inter-disciplinary practices in fashion at the intersection of mainstream fashion, Indigenous art and traditional practices. IFA serves as a platform for Indigenous fashion designers and artists to showcase their work, share their stories, and promote Indigenous cultural expressions and traditional knowledge through fashion.

== Works and credits ==
=== Programming and curatorial work ===
- 2022, Curator & Director, Horeh’ti Yeh Kuh, Nuit Blanche, Toronto
- 2021, Co-Curator, A Thread That Never Breaks, AbTeC Gallery, IFWTO, Second Life
- 2020, Programmer, IFWTO x Simon’s Edito Collaborative Capsule Collection, Toronto
- 2016, Co-Curator, Indian Giver: Truth Telling & Narratives of Representation, Gallery 1818, Toronto

=== Solo shows and exhibitions ===
- 2019, Rations, Urbani_T Public Playground for Urban Culture and Creativity, Toronto
- 2018, Giving Life, Festival Mode & Design, Montreal
- 2012, Synaptic City, Harbourfront Centre, Toronto
- 2012, Synaptic City, Gladstone Hotel, Toronto (self-presented)
- 2011, End of Summer, Oz Studios, Toronto (self-presented)

=== Group shows and exhibitions ===
- 2020, Contemporary Native Art Biennial, BACA, Montreal
- 2019, The View From Here, Artport Gallery, Harbourfront Centre, Toronto
- 2019, Fast Fashion, First Thursdays, Art Gallery of Ontario, Toronto
- 2018, The Future, The Walrus Live, Toronto
- 2018, Hot Culture: Indigenous Fashion, Materials & Crafts, Gallery 101, Asinabka Film & Media Arts Festival, Ottawa
- 2018, Giving Life, Otahpiaaki Fashion Week, Calgary
- 2017, Indigenous Fashion & Wearable Art, Ociciwan Contemporary Art Collective, Western Canada Fashion Week, Edmonton
- 2017, Sculpting Reads, Word on The Street Toronto Book & Magazine Festival, Toronto
- 2017, Crafted Strangers, The Centre for Craft, Creativity & Design, North Carolina
- 2016, Indian Giver: Truth Telling and Narratives of Representation, Gallery 1313, Toronto
- 2016, The Mending Lounge, Craft Ontario Storefront Gallery, Toronto
- 2014, FashioNative, Woodland Cultural Centre, Brantford
- 2013, Indigenous NOW, Royal Ontario Museum, Toronto
- 2009, (Re)Representation, Art Gallery of Ontario, Toronto

=== Commissions ===
- 2017, LabSpace Studio, Toronto, Sculpting New Reads, “7 Fallen Feathers”
- 2016, Setsuné Indigenous Fashion Incubator, Toronto, Indian Giver, “Redress (Re-Dress)”

=== Costume design ===
- 2023, Video Cabaret and Crows Theatre, A Terrible Fate, Director Karin Randoja, theatre
- 2022, Nice Picture Inc., Devonshire Productions Inc., Baswewe Films, A Stellar Film Inc, Stellar, feature film
- 2022, St. Lawrence Centre for the Arts, Svāhā, director and creator Nova Bhattacharya, dance
- 2019, Sienna Films, Trickster (Costume Consultation), director Michelle Latimer, TV series
- 2019, Sonar Pictures, Utopia Falls (Petra character), director Randall Thorne, TV series
- 2019, George Brown College, Munsch Planet, director Esther Jun, theatre
- 2019, National Arts Centre, Unnatural & Accidental Women, director Muriel Miguel, theatre
- 2019, National Film Board of Canada, Woman Dress, director Thirza Cuthand, short film
- 2019, Valeo Management/Jeremy Dutcher, Mehcinut, director Chandler Levack, music video
- 2019, Video Cabaret, Too Good To Be True, director Cliff Cardinal, theatre
- 2019, Independent, Omaagaaman, creator Waawaate Fobister, dance
- 2018, Film Farm, Falls Around Her, director Darlene Naponse, feature film
- 2018, Tarragon Theatre, Cottagers and Indians, director Patti Shaughnassy, theatre
- 2017, Theatre Kingston, Almighty Voice and His Wife, director Lib Spry, theatre
- 2017, Young Peoples Theatre, Munschtime!, director Herbie Barnes, theatre
- 2006, Kent Monkman, Robin’s Hood (Miss Eagle Testickle character), short film
- 2005, Independent, Divided by Zero, director Danis Goulet, short film

== Awards and honours ==
In 2022, Paul was awarded the Changemaker Award at the Canadian Art & Fashion Awards. In 2018, Paul was awarded the Top 25 Woman of Influence award.
