= Delia Opekokew =

Cree-Canadian lawyer, writer and politician

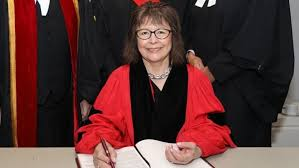
- Delia Opekokew - Law Society of Ontario
- Born: Canoe Lake Reserve, Saskatchewan
- Education: University of Winnipeg; Osgoode Hall
- Occupation: Lawyer
- Known for: Indigenous Activism, Law

Delia Opekokew is a Cree lawyer and writer from the Canoe Lake First Nation in Saskatchewan, Canada. She was the first First Nations woman lawyer to be admitted to the bar association in Ontario and in Saskatchewan, as well as the first woman to run for the leadership of the Assembly of First Nations. Opekokew attended Beauval Indian Residential School and Lebret Indian Residential School. She has received awards for her achievements, including the Aboriginal Achievement Award, Women's Law Association of Ontario Presidents Award, Law Society of Ontario Medal, and Federation of Sovereign Indigenous Nations Lifetime Achievement Award.

== Early life and education ==
A member of the Cree First Nation band, Delia Opekokew was born on the Canoe Lake Reserve in Northern Saskatchewan. Opekokew is the third of eight children born to her parents Marguerite and Jules Opekokew. She lived on the Canoe Lake Reserve until age eight, when she attended the Beauval Indian Residential School, located on what is now the English River Dene Nation. It was not until her attendance at this school that Opekokew learned English, although she managed to maintain her knowledge of the Cree language as a student. Following elementary school, Opekokew moved to the Lebret Indian Residential School. where she completed her high school education. Opekokew attended both schools ten months a year, and only returned home during the holiday where, as the oldest daughter, Opekokew would primarily assist her mother in taking care of their large family. After completing her primary and secondary education, Opekokew pursued undergraduate studies at the University of Winnipeg, where she received a bursary for first year students with distinction, and in 1977 she graduated from Osgoode Hall Law School in Toronto with a Bachelor of Laws.

== Career ==
=== Early career ===
Her first job was as a clerk typist, with the province of Saskatchewan in the Agriculture Department. In 1967 Opekokew then became the first woman to sit on the executive of the Federation of Saskatchewan Indians as secretary. She then went on to work as an administrative assistance for Buffy Sainte-Marie in New York, before choosing to pursue her law career.

=== Legal career ===
Following her graduation from law school, Opekokew was the first Indigenous woman admitted to the Bar of Ontario in 1979 and to the Bar of Saskatchewan in 1983. During law school she worked for a number of groups, such as the National Indian Brotherhood and the Federation of Saskatchewan Indians. From 1979 to 1980, as a partner at Zlotkin & Opekokew, she practiced civil and family law before acting as legal counsel to the Federation of Saskatchewan Indian Nations from 1980 to 1985. She later became an associate with Blaney, McMurty, and Stapells where she worked from 1985 to 1990. Subsequently, she began practicing as a sole practitioner, with a specialization in Indigenous treaty rights and Aboriginal Law. In 1992, Ms. Opekokew presided as one of three chairpeople on the commission of inquiry into the death of Leo Lachance in Royal Canadian Mounted Police v. Saskatchewan (Commission of Inquiry). Opekokew also notably represented the Canoe Lake Cree Peoples in their successful land claim, and Anthony O’Brien “Dudley” George who was killed in the Ipperwash Crisis. Opekokew was responsible for researching Buffy Sainte-Marie's claims of Indigenous ancestry and provided a 1980 letter that advocated for Sainte-Marie to be given Canadian citizenship.

=== Activism and Indigenous community involvement ===
In 1994 Opekokew became the first woman to run for Grand Chief of the Assembly of First Nations' 1994 leadership convention. She lost to Ovide Mercredi. In July 1998 she returned to the Federation of Saskatchewan Indians as their general council. She then proceeded to act as an adjudicator with the Indian Residential Schools Adjudication Process (IRSAP), from 2004 to 2009. This was part of the larger Independent Assessment Process (IAP) under the Indian Residential Schools Settlement Agreement (IRSSA). Opekokew was promoted to Deputy Chief Adjudicator under IRSAP in 2009 and remained in this role until December 2017. During her time as Deputy Chief Adjudicator Opekokew maintained her private practice in Saskatchewan. She was also one of the vice-presidents of the Canadian Civil Liberties Association for several years.

== Awards ==
- 2009 - Aboriginal Achievement Award The National Aboriginal Achievement Foundation Award is awarded to individuals that make astounding achievements for themselves and Indigenous communities. Opekokew stated that it was her upbringing that led her to her work as an indigenous lawyer that earned her this prestigious award. “For demonstrating commitment to the elimination of hate and racism in Canadian society, having served with honour in the Indigenous community, by promoting the fundamental values of equality and respect for diversity and human rights.” As stated on the award received National aboriginal Achievement Award was Awarded to Delia Opekokew in 2009 for her continued work in combating racism not only for Indigenous populations but many minorities.
- 2012 - Women's Law Association of Ontario President's Award Women's Law Association of Ontario President's Award is given to Women who have made significant contributions to the law community. This award caters to women who work within the law community and work to promote other women in the industry. Delia was nominated by Beth Symes and won based on her work and contributions for Indigenous women especially within the field of law.
- 2013 - Law Society of Ontario Medal The Law Society of Ontario Medal is awarded to anyone who displays exemplar work ethic or body of work within the community of Law. Recipients display the "highest ideals of the legal profession"
- 2016 - Federation of Sovereign Indigenous Nations lifetime achievement award The FSIN Lifetime achievement award is awarded to individuals who display excellence across their lifetime, whether that pertains to an individual's career, philanthropy, or lifetime achievements.
- 2019 Law Society of Ontario, presentation of a degree of Doctor of Laws, honoris causa (LLD)

== Publications ==
- The political and legal inequities among Aboriginal peoples in Canada. Institute of Intergovernmental Relations. 1987. ISBN 9780889114210.
- The Interpretation of the Treaties Entered Into by the First Nations and the Crown and the Nature and Status of the Oral Promises in Relation to the Written Terms of the Treaties. Royal Commission on Aboriginal Peoples. 1993. OCLC 62862801.
- The First Nations: Indian government and the Canadian Confederation. Federation of Saskatchewan Indians. 1980.
- Indians of Canada seek a special status. American Indian Journal. 1980.
- The treaty right to education in Saskatchewan. The Windsor yearbook of access to justice. 1992.
