= Amisk Lake (Alberta) =

Mountain in the country of Canada

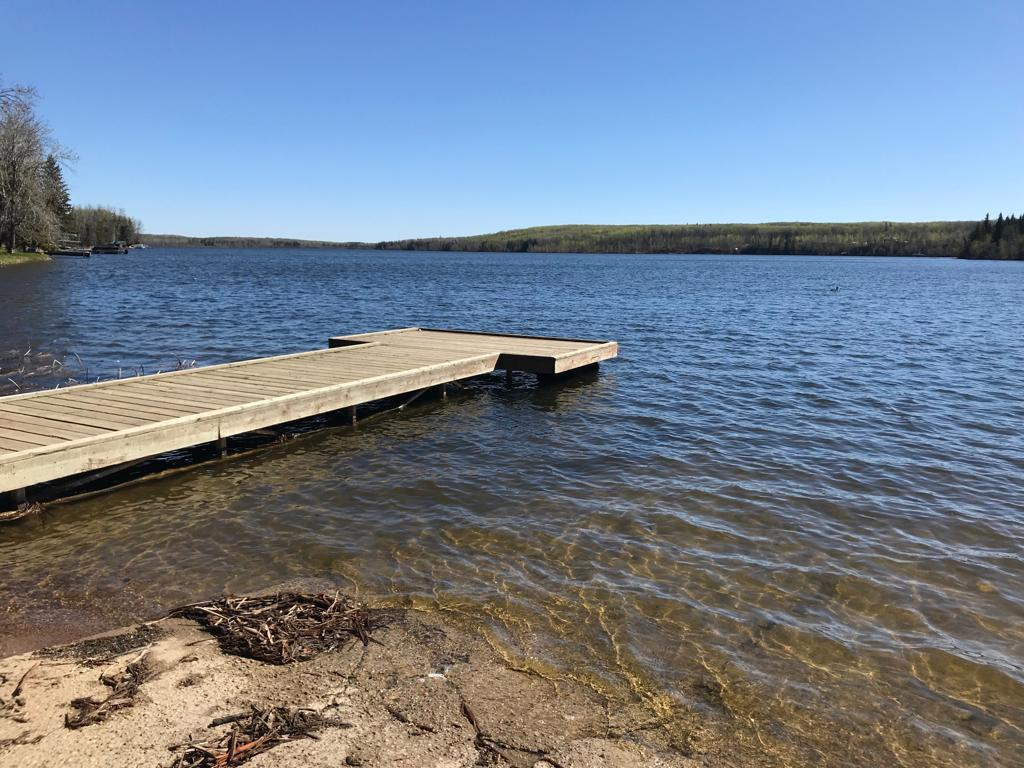

- Location within Alberta
- Location: Athabasca County, Alberta
- Coordinates: 54°35′37″N 112°37′59″W
- Type: Oxbow
- Primary inflows: Beaver River
- Primary outflows: Amisk River
- Basin countries: Canada
- Max. length: 6.34 km (3.94 mi)
- Max. width: 9.8 km (6.1 mi)
- Surface area: 5 km^{2} (1.9 sq mi)
- Average depth: 15.5 m (51 ft)
- Max. depth: 60 m (200 ft)
- Residence time: 8 days
- Shore length^{1}: 24.6 m (81 ft)
- Surface elevation: 611 m (2,005 ft)
- ^{1} Shore length is not a well-defined measure.

Amisk Lake is a lake located in central Alberta about 175 km (109 mi) northeast of the City of Edmonton and 15 km (9.3 mi) east of the village of Boyle.

== History ==
In the 1940s a Mink farm and resort with boat and cabin rentals were established on the northwest shore of the lake. Later it was replaced with two subdivisions and a trailer park which was built at the north end of the lake. However a majority of the shoreline remains undeveloped.

== See also ==
- Lakes of Alberta
