= Patuanak =

Community in Saskatchewan, Canada

Location of Patuanak in Saskatchewan

Patuanak (Woods Cree: ᐘᐹᒋᐘᓈᕽ, romanized: wapâciwanâhk)is a community in northern Saskatchewan, Canada. It is the administrative headquarters of the Dene First Nations reserve near Churchill River and the north end of Lac Île-à-la-Crosse. In Dene, it sounds similar to Boni Cheri (Bëghą́nı̨ch’ërë).

The community consists of the Northern Hamlet of Patuanak with 64 residents governed by a mayor and 2 councillors and the adjoining Wapachewunak 192D Indian reserve of the English River First Nation with 482 residents (Canada Census 2011). The reserve is governed by a Chief and six councillors.

Patuanak is about 92 km (57 mi.) north of Beauval at the end of Highway 918.

== History ==
Patuanak is located west of the Shagwenaw Rapids on the Churchill River. The community stretches for a mile and a half along the shoreline, with the reserve near the year-round open water below the rapids and the non-Treaty homes facing onto Shagwenaw Lake. Most of the families now at Patuanak traditionally lived down river at Primeau Lake, Dipper Lake, Knee Lake, and Cree Lake.

As in most northern communities, the Hudson's Bay Company set up a store at Patuanak to replace those further down the Churchill River, which made Patuanak a fur-buying centre.

In 1916, Father Louis Moraud became the resident priest of Patuanak and served the English River Band area until his death in 1965. The main denomination is Roman Catholic.

Patuanak's permanent population remained small until 1968 when all the people in the surrounding areas began moving in.

In 1968, the school opened at Patuanak and many families moved in so their children could attend. Prior to 1968, the children were sent to the Indian Residential schools at Beauval and Ile a la Crosse, while their families went north to trap.

The traditional activities of the people of Patuanak can be seen on all sides during visitations, such as moose hide tanning, beadwork of various sorts and birch toboggans.

Patuanak people are employed in a wide variety of jobs such as the mines at Rabbit Lake and Key Lake, government jobs or Band office employed.

=== Cross Island ===
On April 27, 1885, during the North-West Rebellion, most of the personnel and dependants of the Hudson's Bay Company Post and the Roman Catholic Mission of Île-à-la-Crosse, who were alarmed at the looting of the Green Lake Post the previous day, fled to a small wooded island north of Patuanak and were helped by the Denesuline of the area. On May 24, the exiles erected a large cross on their island of refuge (now known as Cross Island 55°59′46.1″N 107°40′26.9″W) and returned to Île-à-la-Crosse on May 29.

== Demographics ==
In the 2021 Census of Population conducted by Statistics Canada, Patuanak had a population of 63 living in 28 of its 32 total private dwellings, a change of -13.7% from its 2016 population of 73. With a land area of 1.09 km^{2} (0.42 sq mi), it had a population density of 57.8/km^{2} (149.7/sq mi) in 2021.

Wapachewunak 192D is part of the English River Dene Nation. As of May 2012, the total membership of English River Dene First Nation was 1,451 with 774 members living on-reserve and 677 members living off-reserve.

== See also ==
- Patuanak Airport
- Denesuline language
- Denesuline
