= MLTC =

MLTC is an initialism for:

- The Meadow Lake Tribal Council, a Saskatchewan tribal council
- The Ministry of Long-Term Care, an Ontario government Ministry
