= Saskatchewan Highway 918 =

Provincial highway in Saskatchewan, Canada

Highway 918

Route information
- Maintained by Ministry of Highways and Infrastructure
- Length: 92 km (57 mi)

Major junctions
- South end: Highway 165 near Beauval
- North end: Fisher Avenue in Patuanak

Location
- Country: Canada
- Province: Saskatchewan

Highway system
- Provincial highways in Saskatchewan
| ← Highway 917 | → Highway 919 |

Highway 918 is a provincial highway in the north-west and far north regions of the Canadian province of Saskatchewan. It runs from Highway 165 near Beauval to Patuanak. The highway follows the Beaver River, runs along the eastern shore of Lac Île-à-la-Crosse, western shore of Shagwenaw Lake, and provides access to Patuanak Airport. It is about 92 kilometres (57 mi) long.

== See also ==
- Roads in Saskatchewan
- Transportation in Saskatchewan
