= Beauval Indian Residential School =

Coordinates: 55°9′19″N 107°35′5″W

Beauval Residential School Fire
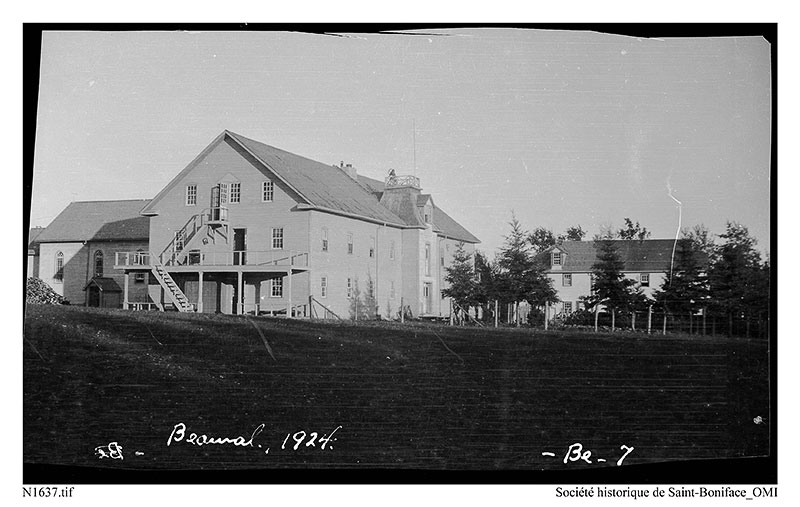
- Beauval Residential School in 1924
- Date: September 19, 1927
- Venue: Canadian residential school
- Location: Beauval, Saskatchewan
- Cause: furnace
- Deaths: 20
- Injuries: unknown

Beauval Indian Residential School (1895–1983) near the northern village of Beauval, Saskatchewan was a Canadian residential school operated by the Roman Catholic Church for First Nations children. It was run by the Missionary Oblates of Mary Immaculate and the Grey Nuns.

The school was on what is now the La Plonge 192 reserve across the Beaver River from Beauval. La Plonge 192 is part of the English River Dene Nation and had 115 residents in 2011.

A fire on September 19–20, 1927, and an influenza epidemic in 1937 took the lives of many students.

== History ==
Location of Beauval Residential School in Saskatchewan

The Beauval Indian Residential School opened in 1895 and closed in 1983. It then became the Meadow Lake Tribal Council's Beauval Indian Education Centre, which closed in 1995. The main building was demolished in the summer of 1995.

In 1911 when Bishop Charlebois visited the school he wrote that all the 44 children there were taught both French and English but that the use of French dominated. In 1927 there were 37 students in the school, 18 girls and 19 boys, when the wooden building was destroyed by fire. All the boys perished.

In 1931 with the promise of a $75,000.00 grant from the Federal government a new school was started and was almost complete in January 1932. The school was made with bricks produced locally.

In 1937 a flu epidemic took the lives of more students.

=== Fire of 1927 ===
During the night of September 19–20, 1927 the fire alarm rang while thirty-seven students and eight Grey Nuns were sleeping. "The fire started at the centre of the building close to the furnaces. It spread into the hallway and into the boy's dormitory and closed the outside exits. The children tried to save themselves through an inside staircase but were stopped by the flames. The whole boy's dormitory was in flames. The older girls were heroic in guiding the younger girls to safety. Father Francois Gagnon almost suffocated. In the blink of an eye the building was totally engulfed in flames. The furnaces had been checked just three days previously. Sister Lea (Eloise Bellerose) and nineteen boys, from the ages of 7 to 12, died." wrote the principal of the school Father Mederic Adam. (translation) "The burnt remains of the twenty victims were buried in two caskets." wrote Father Penard.(translation)

The following list of boys who died in the fire was taken from the memorial monument.

- Marcel Lemaigre age 7
- Jimmy Iron age 8
- Alex Opikokew age 8
- Simon Sayers (Sayesc) age 8
- Raphael Corrigal age 9
- Jules Coulionner age 9
- Samuel Gardiner age 9
- Roderique Iron age 10
- Joseph Sayers (Sayesc) age 10
- Thomas Alcrow age 11
- Freddy Bishop age 11
- Antoine Durocher age 11
- Patrice Grosventre age 11
- Frank Kimbley age 11
- Alfred Laliberté age 11
- Moise Larivière age 11
- Zéphrin Morin age 11
- Albert Sylvestre age 11
- Ernest Bishop age 12

=== Epidemic of February 1937 ===
"In the course of last winter an epidemic of influenza and measles ravaged the north-west part of the Vicariate. It first started in Beauval and struck almost all the population. Our Indian school and the rectory were immediately converted into hospitals and despite the efforts of the religious personnel there were 60 victims, 20 at the school and more than 40 among the families of the Mission. With an equal violence the epidemic arrived rapidly to our other Missions of the north particularly Île-à-la-Crosse, Buffalo River (Dillon) and Portage La Loche. In each of these Missions the death toll was around 50 people." wrote Bishop Lajeunesse in 1937 (translation).

== See also ==
- Canadian Indian residential school system
- List of residential schools in Canada
