= Frog Portage =

Portage in Saskatchewan, Canada

Coordinates: 55°23′55″N 103°31′57″W

Location of Frog Portage on the fur trade route from Lake Winnipeg to Lake Athabasca

Frog Portage or Portage du Traite was one of the most important portages on the voyageur route from Eastern Canada to the Mackenzie River basin. It allowed boatmen to move from the Saskatchewan River basin to the Churchill River basin. The Churchill then led west to the Mackenzie River basin. The fur trade route ran from Cumberland House, Saskatchewan north up the Sturgeon-Weir River. At its source the 300-yard Frog Portage ran, with a 20-foot drop, to Trade Lake on the Churchill a few miles west of the mouth of Reindeer River. The route then ran at least 250 miles northwest up the Churchill to Methye Portage which led to the Mackenzie basin.

The name is said to come from a dried frog skin that the Cree Nation put up in derision of the Chipewyan's incompetence in preparing beaver skin. The name Traite (trade) comes from Frobisher's coup (see below). Today there are still a plank road and push car. There is a cairn at the Churchill side.

Louis Primeau seems to have built a log hut on the Churchill side of the portage some time before 1774. In 1774, Primeau and Joseph Frobisher came north from Cumberland Lake to Primeau's hut and intercepted a large number of furs destined for the HBC at Churchill, Manitoba. With all his canoes full he headed for Grand Portage. In 1775, he, Thomas Frobisher, and Alexander Henry the elder, tried to return but were caught by the freeze at Amisk Lake. Next spring, Thomas Frobisher went north and built a fort on the north bank of the Churchill. Joseph Frobisher and Alexander Henry followed a few months later. Again, they diverted a great deal of trade from the HBC. In 1777 Joseph Frobisher returned, but the HBC sent Robert Davey inland and he managed to ensure that the furs reached Hudson Bay. Peter Pond probably wintered near here in 1776-77 and 1777–78. The fort seems to have been abandoned after this.

Primeau's hut is thought to have been on a small point near the north end of the portage and Frobisher's fort was probably across from the portage on the north side of Trade Lake.

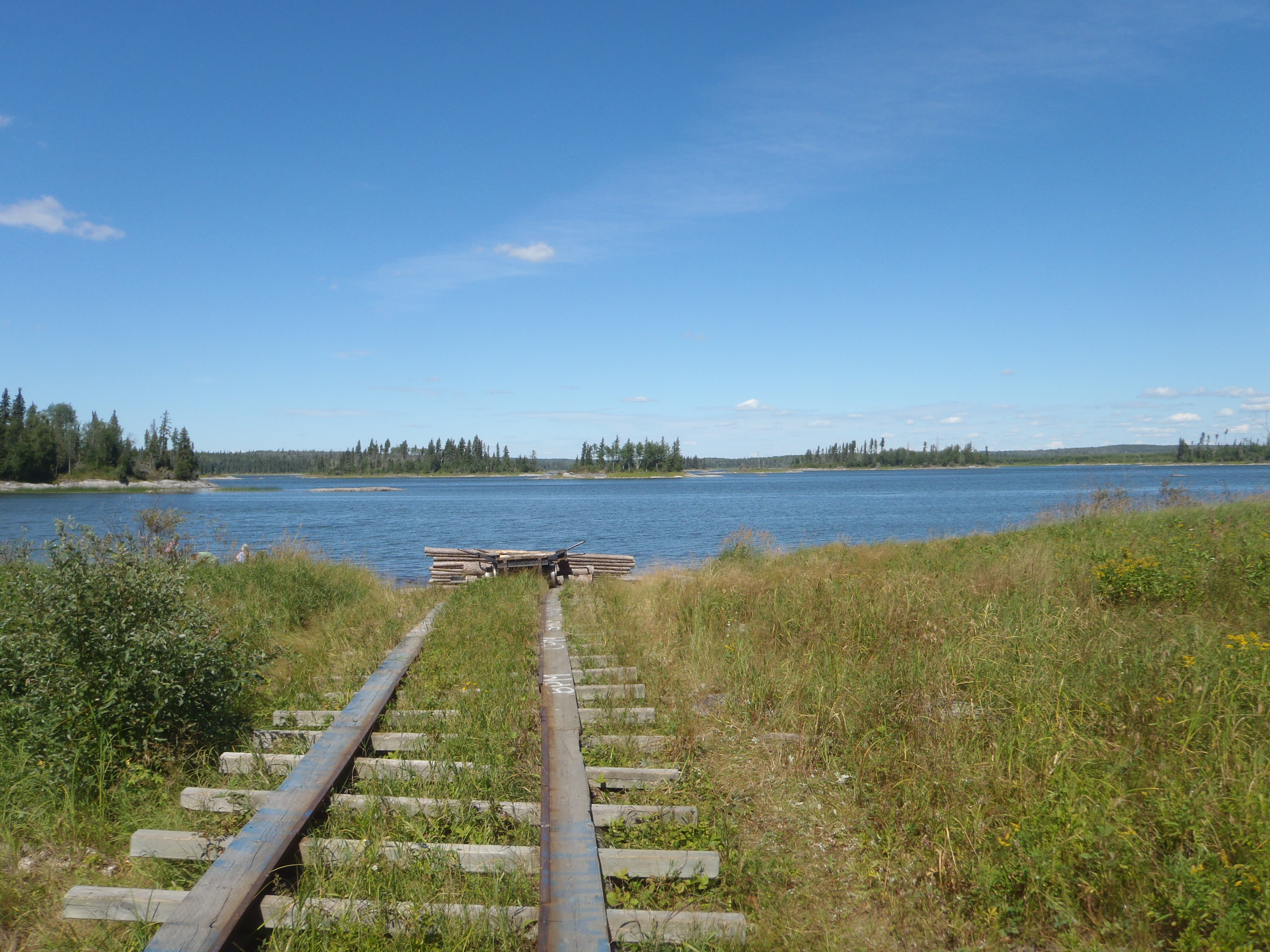
Frog Portage into the Churchill River

== National Historic Event ==
Frog Portage was designated the Frog Portage National Historic Event in 1977.

A plaque on the Churchill River reads:

"This portage linking the Saskatchewan and Churchill basins was long known and used by native travellers; it owes its name to a frog skin once hung here by Cree in derision of the Chipewyan's hunting abilities. In 1774 Joseph Frobisher first intercepted a Chipewyan trading party here en route from Lake Athabasca to the Hudson's Bay post at Churchill. Four years later Peter Pond carried the trade over the portage and into the Athabasca country itself. Thenceforth, for over fifty years this was an important part of the principal transcontinental canoe route of trade and exploration." Parks Canada

== Historic map ==
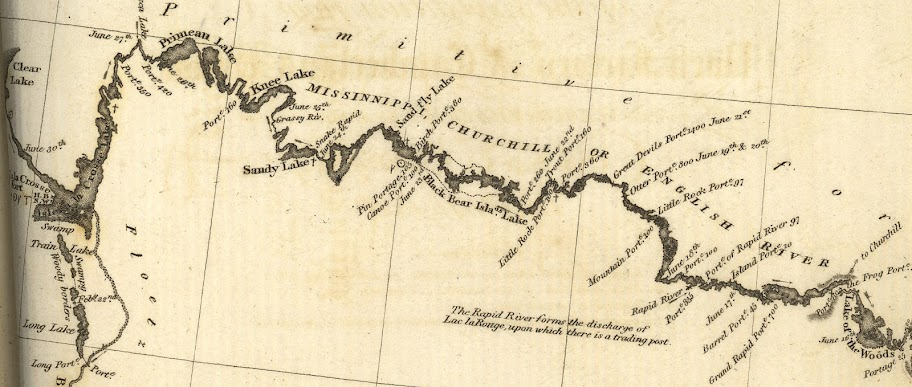
John Franklin's 1819-1822 expedition map detailing the Churchill River fur trade route from Frog Portage to Lac Île-à-la-Crosse

Starting from upstream the map shows Clear Lake now Churchill Lake (from the north) and the Beaver River (from the south) flowing into Lac Île-à-la-Crosse. Lac Île-à-la-Crosse then flows into the Churchill River (then also known as the Missinnippi or the English River). The length of the portages on this map are measured in yards.

== See also ==
- Canadian canoe routes (early)
