= K192 =

K192 or K-192 may refer to:

- K-192 (Kansas highway), state highway in Kansas
- Mass in F major, K. 192
- HMS Bryony (K192), former UK Royal Navy ship
- Haultain Lake 192K, Indian reserve
