= Lac la Plonge =

Lake in Saskatchewan, Canada

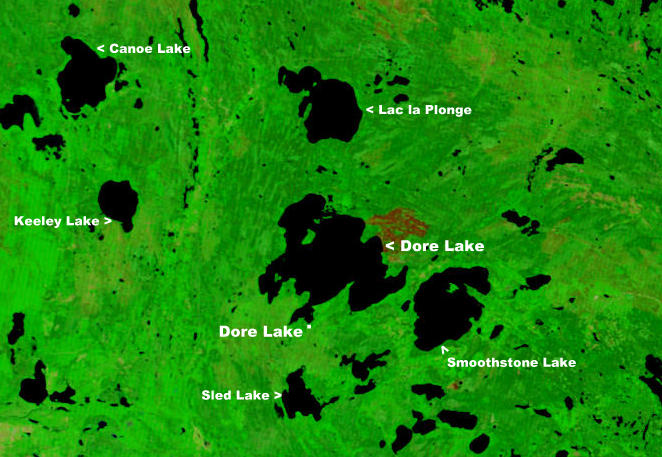
- NASA image of Lac la Plonge north of Doré Lake

- Location in Saskatchewan Lac la Plonge (Canada)
- Location: Northern Administration District, Saskatchewan
- Coordinates: 55°08′N 107°20′W
- Part of: Churchill River drainage basin
- Primary outflows: Rivière la Plonge
- Basin countries: Canada
- Max. depth: 65 m (213 ft)
- Shore length^{1}: 109.8 km (68.2 mi)
- Surface elevation: 446 m (1,463 ft)
- Islands: Weber Island
- Settlements: Lac La Plonge
- ^{1} Shore length is not a well-defined measure.

Lac la Plonge is a glacial lake in the Canadian province of Saskatchewan in the basin of the Beaver River, near Lac Île-à-la-Crosse. It is located in the boreal forest near the Canadian Shield. On the lake's northern shore, the community of Lac La Plonge, a resort, and campgrounds are accessed via Highway 165.

The Rivière la Plonge, Lac la Plonge's outflow, flows west from the north-west section of the lake into Beaver River at Beauval. The lake's outflow is the site of the Lac La Plonge Dam, which is operated by the Saskatchewan Water Security Agency.

== Lac la Plonge Dam ==
Lac la Plonge Dam (55.1611°N 107.5092°W) is at the start of Rivière la Plonge, about 8 kilometres (5.0 mi) north-east of Beauval. The original dam was built in the 1930s and then reconstructed in 1985. Further upgrades were undertaken in 2010, which included upgraded hydraulic control and the addition of a fish ladder. The dam is 1.7 m (5 ft 7 in) high.

== Recreation ==
Recreational facilities are at the northern part of the lake and include two resorts and a recreational area / campground. Access is from Highway 165.

=== Sandy Beach Resort ===
Along an 8-kilometre (5.0 mi) stretch of sandy beaches on the northern shore is Sandy Beach Resort. The resort has a lodge with six guest rooms, a lounge, licensed dining, conference facilities, camping with RV hookups, and access to the lake for swimming, boating, and fishing.

=== Angler's Trail Resort ===
At the north-west corner of the lake is Angler's Trail Resort. Angler's Trail has access to the lake, cabin rentals, a campground, convenience store, restaurant with licensed dining, and a tackle shop.

=== Lac la Plonge Campground ===
Lac la Plonge Campground is a recreational park that has 19 campsites and access to the lake for fishing, swimming, and boating. The park stretches from Rivière la Plonge and the dam north to Angler's Trail Resort.

== Fish species ==
Fish commonly found in Lac la Plonge include walleye, sauger, yellow perch, northern pike, lake trout, lake whitefish, cisco, white sucker, longnose sucker, and burbot.

== See also ==
- List of lakes of Saskatchewan
- List of dams and reservoirs in Canada
