= Pinehouse Photography Club =

Saskatchewan therapeutic photography club

The Pinehouse Photography Club is a therapeutic photography club in the northern community of Pinehouse, Saskatchewan, Canada. The club uses photography to engage area youth experiencing mental health issues.

== History ==
The club was founded in 2016 by Dre Erwin, a Pinehouse primary care nurse who sought alternative treatment methods for local youth who were experiencing mental health issues. The club achieved notoriety in Canada following a 2018 Canadian Broadcasting Corporation documentary titled New Lens on Life. Additional media coverage resulted in donations of cash and equipment to the club from donors across Canada. In 2019, Kids Help Phone purchased 12 photographs by Pinehouse youth for its Finding Hope action plan supporting First Nations, Inuit and Métis young people. Summarizing the club's method, in 2018 Saskatchewan's Advocate for Children and Youth wrote that "Pinehouse Lake youth have indicated that photography is a healthy outlet that helps with feeling lost or depressed. Looking at the beauty of nature through the camera lens generates appreciation for what they have, instead of focusing on the negative."
