= Green Lake (Saskatchewan) =

Lake in Saskatchewan, Canada

- Lac Vert
- Location in Saskatchewan Green Lake (Canada)
- Location: RM of Meadow Lake No. 588 and Northern Administration District, Saskatchewan
- Coordinates: 54.1667°N 107.7173°W
- Part of: Churchill River drainage basin
- Primary inflows: Tea Creek
- River sources: Meadow Lake Escarpment
- Primary outflows: Green River
- Basin countries: Canada
- Max. length: 26 km (16 mi)
- Max. width: 1.2 km (0.75 mi)
- Max. depth: 91 m (300 ft)
- Surface elevation: 468 m (1,535 ft)
- Settlements: Green Lake

Green Lake is an elongated lake in the Canadian province of Saskatchewan. The northern part of the lake is in Saskatchewan's Northern Administration District while the southern part is in the Rural Municipality of Meadow Lake No. 588. At the northern tip of Green Lake is the village of Green Lake and the lake's outflow, Green River. The village is one of the oldest communities in Saskatchewan and was important during the fur trade era as a staging and trading post. Green River flows north into Beaver River.

At the north-western part of Green Lake are campgrounds, outfitters, cabins, and lodges. Access to the lake and its amenities is from the village of Green Lake and Highway 55.

== History ==
In 1782, Angus Shaw of the North West Company (NWC) built an over-wintering post at the lake called Green Lake House. In 1793, it became permanent. A few years later, in 1799, William Auld and the Hudson's Bay Company (HBC) set up Essex House on the west side of the lake. With animosity between the two companies growing, the NWC burned down Essex House in 1805. It was rebuilt in 1810 and then seized by the NWC in 1816–1817. The HBC re-established the post the following year. In 1821, the two companies merged and shortly after that, the trading post at Green Lake closed. It re-opened in 1831 and remained open until 1973.

Green Lake was at an important juncture along the Carlton Trail fur trade route between Fort Carlton at the North Saskatchewan River and the Methye Portage, which accessed the Athabasca River system. Goods were transported by ox carts over land from Fort Carlton to Green Lake where they would be stored until transported by river to Île-à-la-Crosse. Green River, Green Lake's outflow, connects to Beaver River which "provided an east–west waterway half-way between the Athabasca River to the north and the Saskatchewan River to the south".

== Description ==
Green Lake is a long, narrow lake in a glacier-carved valley east of the city of Meadow Lake. The lake's main inflow, Tea Creek, enters the lake at its southern end. Tea Creek begins at Shell Lake and flows north into Green Lake. Green River, Green Lake's outflow, starts at the lake's northern end and flows north into Beaver River.

== Recreation ==
Green Lake Lodge is at the north-west corner of lake. The lodge has a campground, rustic cabins, boat rentals, and lake access. Safari River Lakeside is also at the north-west corner. It is a big game outfitters with modern accommodations. On the lake's north-eastern shore is an RV park and campground.

== Fish species ==
Fish commonly found in Green Lake include walleye, northern pike, and yellow perch. The lake was stocked with lake trout in 1989.

== See also ==
- List of lakes of Saskatchewan
- North American fur trade
- Tourism in Saskatchewan
