= Shagwenaw Lake =

Lake in Saskatchewan, Canada

- Location in Saskatchewan Shagwenaw Lake (Canada)
- Location: Northern Administration District, Saskatchewan
- Coordinates: 55.9001°N 107.684°W
- Part of: Churchill River drainage basin
- Primary inflows: Churchill River
- Primary outflows: Churchill River
- Basin countries: Canada
- Surface area: 10,936 ha (27,020 acres)
- Max. depth: 16.5 m (54 ft)
- Shore length^{1}: 106 km (66 mi)
- Surface elevation: 425 m (1,394 ft)
- Settlements: Patuanak
- ^{1} Shore length is not a well-defined measure.

Shagwenaw Lake is a lake along the course of the Churchill River in the Canadian province of Saskatchewan. The Churchill River is largely a series of interconnected lakes that begins at Churchill Lake in north-western Saskatchewan and empties into the Hudson Bay at Churchill, Manitoba. Upstream from Shagwenaw Lake along the Churchill River is Lac Île-à-la-Crosse and downstream is Dipper Lake. The lake is about 52 kilometres (32 mi) north-northeast of the community of Île-à-la-Crosse and is surrounded by boreal forest in the Canadian Shield.

The community of Patuanak and Wapachewunak 192D Indian reserve are situated along the lake's western shore where the Churchill River flows in. Access to the communities and the lake is from Highway 918 and Patuanak Airport.

== Description ==
Shagwenaw Lake is a lake along the course of the Churchill River. It covers an area of 10,936 hectares (27,020 acres), has a shoreline of 106 kilometres (66 mi), and has a maximum depth of about 16.5 metres (54 ft). The Churchill River flows a short distance from Île-à-la-Crosse over the Shagwenaw Rapids into the western shore of Shagwenaw Lake. The river flows out from the north-eastern part of the lake.

Jones Bay — a large bay encompassing much of the south-eastern part of the lake — is named after Wilfred Alexander Jones through the Geomemorial Naming Program. The program names geographical features after people who died in the service of Canada.

== Fish species ==
Fish species commonly found in Shagwenaw Lake include walleye, northern pike, cisco, lake whitefish, burbot, white sucker, and yellow perch.

== See also ==
- List of lakes of Saskatchewan
