= Green Lake, Saskatchewan =

Northern village in Saskatchewan, Canada

Green Lake ᐊᒁᑯᐲᐏ ᓵᑲᐦᐃᑲᓂᕽ
- Northern village
- Location of Green Lake in Saskatchewan Green Lake (Canada)
- Coordinates: 54°17′28″N 107°47′28″W
- Country: Canada
- Province: Saskatchewan
- District: Northern Saskatchewan Administration District

Government
  - Mayor: Roy Kelvin
  - Administrator: Tina Rasmussen
  - MLA Athabasca: Leroy Laliberte
  - MP Desnethé— Missinippi—Churchill River: Buckley Belanger

Area
  - Land: 121.92 km^{2} (47.07 sq mi)

Population (2011)
  - Total: 418
  - Density: 3.4/km^{2} (8.8/sq mi)
- Time zone: UTC−6 (Central Standard Time)
  - Summer (DST): UTC−5
- Postal code: S0M 1B0
- Highways: Highway 55 / Highway 155
- Post office established: 1901
- Website: Official Website

Green Lake (Woods Cree: ᐊᒁᑯᐲᐏ ᓵᑲᐦᐃᑲᓂᕽ, romanized: akwâkopîwi-sâkahikanihk) is a northern village in Saskatchewan, Canada. Its residents are predominantly Métis people. Green Lake is northeast of the city of Meadow Lake, and northwest of the town of Big River. It lies in the southern boreal forest at the northern end of Green Lake, where Green River flows out and to Beaver River. The village takes its name from the lake. Fishing, tourism, and farming, are the major industries.

== History ==
The Northern Village of Green Lake dates back to 1782, when the North West Company (NWC) established a wintering post on Green Lake. In 1793 the NWC established a permanent post, and in 1810 the Hudson's Bay Company (HBC) established itself on the lake. In 1816–1817, the NWC seized the HBC post and its men, however a HBC post was re-established by 1818, and in 1821 the two companies merged. Shortly after the merger, the Green Lake post was closed for several years, reopening in 1831, and continuing operation until 1973. The Green Lake post was an important post in north-central Saskatchewan, connecting many overland trails with the Churchill River.

By the mid 19th century, missionaries had established the Roman Catholic Church in Green Lake. In 1876, Treaty 6 was signed, and soon after settlers began moving into the area. Natives were allowed to join Treaty 6, or had the option of taking scrip. During the North-West Rebellion the HBC store in Green Lake was ransacked by Cree from Frog Lake.

In 1900, a telegraph service and post office were established, and a trail to Meadow Lake was opened. In 1901 a new church was built by the community.

By 1939, the local Métis were subjected to a Government program called the Green Lake Metis Rehabilitation Program. A Government project created and designed to assimilate the people of Green Lake into mainstream society, southern Metis from the Regina area were introduced to the northern community as part of the rehabilitation program. The new arrivals were unable to adapt to the lifestyle and after a year began relocating en masse to Prince Albert or Meadow Lake. The provincial government set up Central Farm, a program of 99-year leases on 40 acres (16 ha) plots. In addition, a new road was built to Meadow Lake and Île-à-la-Crosse. In 1940, an outpost hospital was built by the government and run by Sisters of the Presentation of Mary. The Sisters also oversaw the running of a cannery, carpentry, and sewing shops. By 1945 a Timber Board and Local Improvement District (LID) were established. A saw mill was opened under the Timber Board, which employed up to 100 men. Under the LID, the Central Farm was expanded, and the Silver Lake Farm was formed in 1965, consisting of mixed farming with an emphasis on cattle.

In 1947, Highway 155 was established, replacing the existing bush trail, the "Old Bay Trail", connecting Green Lake to Beauval. The highway was completed in 1957, extending to the south side of the Buffalo Narrows Channel. A year-round ferry was set up at Buffalo Narrows.

A Royal Canadian Mounted Police (RCMP) detachment and a Red Cross Nursing Station were established in 1953.

In 1972, the LID was replaced by the Department of Northern Saskatchewan (DNS) with a Local Community Authority (LCA). Green Lake, and the area within a three-mile (4.8 km) radius from the centre of the community, became Northern Community Area 17. The first LCA members were elected in 1974. In 1974 a new sawmill was built, and in 1975–76, Highway 55 to Meadow Lake was completed, and a DNS funded sewer and water system is installed.

In 1983, Green Lake was incorporated as a northern village.

In 1992, the community-owned sawmill, Green Lake Metis Wood Products Limited, was incorporated. The mill signed agreements with Weyerhaeuser, Norsask Forest Products, Mistik Management, and the Province of Saskatchewan, before burning down in 2000. The mill was rebuilt in 2002, only to close in 2003.

In 1996, the Provincial Government gave Central Farm to the Northern Village of Green Lake, and in 2006 it obtained ownership of the Silver Lake Farm as well. In 1998, Green Lake Metis Farms Limited was incorporated, and the community operated the two farms with the aid of the board. Both farms are operated as community pasture. Central farm is 9,000 acres (3,600 ha), and Silver Lake is 3,649.2 acres (1,476.8 ha).

=== Green Lake House and Essex House ===
In 1782, the North West Company established Green Lake House on the southwest shore of the lake. As of 1790, it was only occupied in winter and was an outpost of Lac Île-à-la-Crosse. When William McGillivray at Lac Île-à-la-Crosse was in charge of the Churchill River department he arranged for pemmican to be shipped north from the Saskatchewan to the northern posts. In 1795 the men at Green Lake House were near starvation when a pemmican supply arrived from Fort George. In 1798, David Thompson passed through. He sent his canoes on up the Beaver River toward Lac La Biche while he went on horseback to Fort George on the Saskatchewan before returning to his canoes. In 1799 the Hudson's Bay Company sent William Auld to build Essex House on the northwest shore of the lake near its outlet. The NWC moved its post up the lake directly across from its rival. By the next winter the NWC had 30 men and the HBC 11. The whole Île à la Crosse region produced 12,000 made beaver for the NWC and 1,800 for the HBC. In 1806 the Nor'Westers burnt down the HBC post. In 1810 Robert Sutherland rebuilt the post. Samuel Black of the NWC only had to send one man to threaten the Indians away. The Nor'Westers burned the post in 1811. In 1815, it was rebuilt. From 1814, Peter Skene Ogden was in charge of the NWC post. He executed or murdered an Indian for the crime of trading with the HBC. When the HBC got a Montreal warrant for him in 1818 the NWC transferred him to the Columbia District where he became very important. Around 1817, Ogden and Samuel Black plundered the post and arrested its officers. It was back in operation in 1818. In 1820, Sir John Franklin visited Essex House. In 1821 the two companies merged and HBC operations were moved to Green Lake House which used that name under the HBC. It became increasingly important for supplies moving north from the Saskatchewan. In 1875–76 an ox-cart road was cut north from Fort Carlton. The HBC closed its store in 1973.

=== Looting of Green Lake House ===
At the time of the North-West Rebellion in 1885, the Hudson's Bay Company post in Green Lake was waiting for the ice to break on the northern lakes and rivers so that the stockpile of goods in their warehouses could be safely sent up the Beaver River to posts further north including the Athabasca and Mackenzie River Districts. Within these warehouses were a year's supply of goods for these northern posts.

On April 25, 1885, James Sinclair — the factor of the post having been forewarned by Father Mélasyppe Paquette OMI of approaching rebels — immediately gave the order to submerge into the lake all the lead balls and shot. He loaded four York boats with 246 barrels of powder and 200 rifles, along with a large quantity of stock and sent the boats that night towards Île-à-la-Crosse. The next morning on April 26, he loaded the rest of his men and their families along with the missionary and his companions on another boat. As they were ready to leave the shore 25 Cree from Loon Lake stopped them. Sinclair was taken prisoner, but the others were let go to continue on their way. From Sinclair they demanded food saying they were starving, but their demands did not stop there. They started breaking boxes, opening bales, slashing open bags of sugar and flour with their knives taking whatever pleased them and destroying the rest. While the post was being looted, Sinclair managed to slip away from his guards and fled by canoe with two Métis men from Fort Carlton. Sinclair was able to rejoin the boats and while they camped on the side of the river, his wife gave birth to a healthy girl who was immediately baptized by Father Paquette.

== Demographics ==
In the 2021 Census of Population conducted by Statistics Canada, Green Lake had a population of 411 living in 168 of its 220 total private dwellings, a change of −4.2% from its 2016 population of 429. With a land area of 121.18 km^{2} (46.79 sq mi), it had a population density of 3.4/km^{2} (8.8/sq mi) in 2021.

Canada census – Green Lake community profile

	2021	2011
Population	411 (-4.2% from 2016)	418 (+15.8% from 2006)
Land area	121.18 km^{2} (46.79 sq mi)	121.92 km^{2} (47.07 sq mi)
Population density	3.4/km^{2} (8.8/sq mi)	3.4/km^{2} (8.8/sq mi)
Median age	39.2 (M: 39.2, F: 39.2)	32.8 (M: 34.0, F: 31.0)
Private dwellings	220 (total) 168 (occupied)	197 (total)
Median household income	$65,500

References: 2021 2011

== See also ==
- List of communities in Saskatchewan
- List of villages in Saskatchewan
