= Amisk River =

River in Alberta, Canada

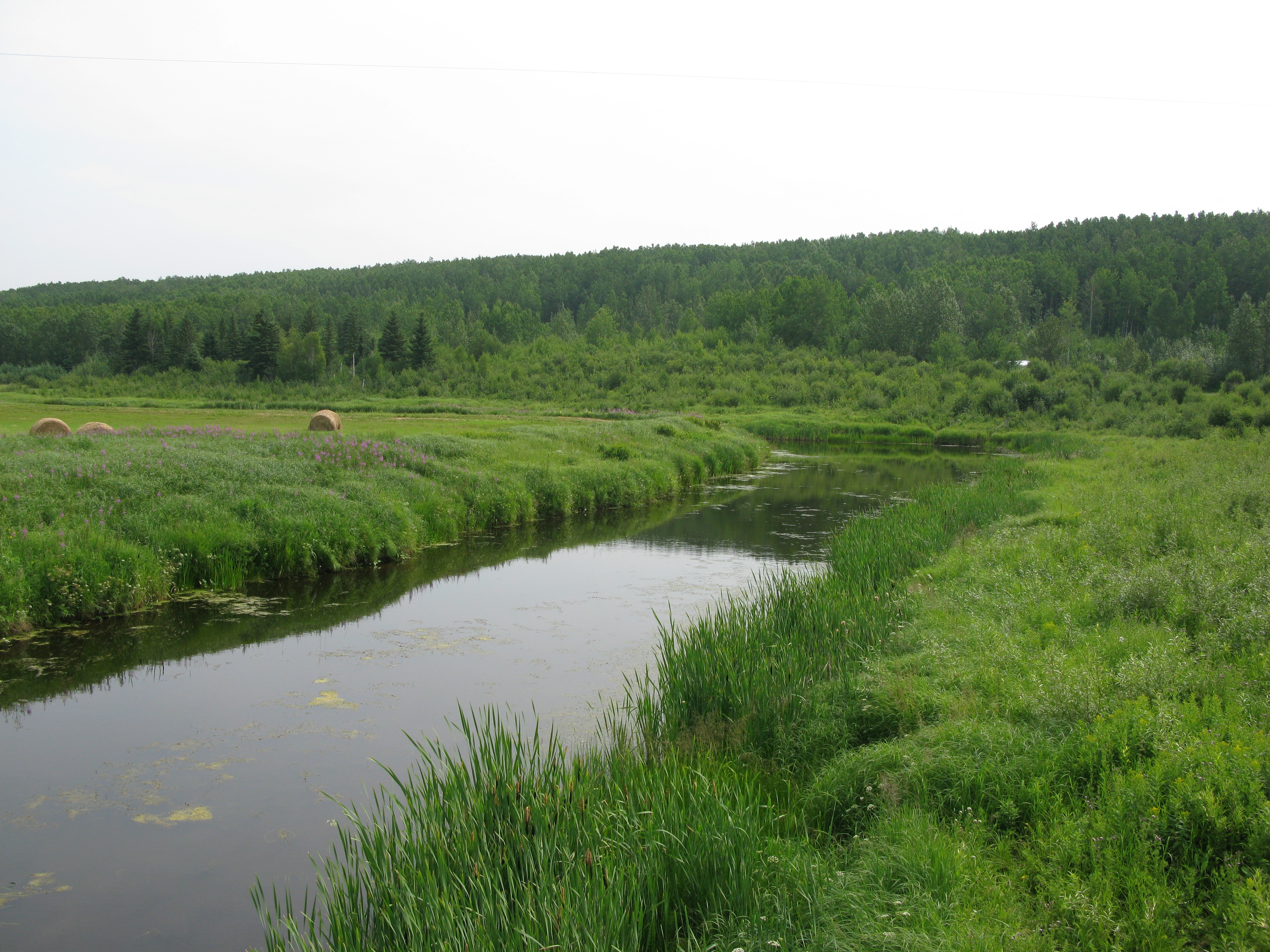
- The Amisk River south of Lac La Biche, Alberta

Location
- Country: Canada
- Province: Alberta

Physical characteristics
- Source
  - location: Amisk Lake
  - coordinates: 54°37′32″N 112°36′37″W
  - elevation: 615 m (2,018 ft)
- Mouth
  - location: Beaver River
  - coordinates: 54°27′50″N 111°46′15″W
  - elevation: 543 m (1,781 ft)

Amisk River is a river in east-central Alberta located in the basin of the Beaver River. The Amisk River forms at Amisk Lake and travels in a south-east direction, flowing through the Buffalo Lake and Kikino Metis settlements before being bridged by Highway 36. It joins the Beaver River near Alberta Secondary Highway 866. The Beaver River is a major tributary of the Churchill River, which flows east into Hudson Bay.

Amisk is the Cree name for beaver.

== Tributaries ==
- Little Beaver Lake
- Cordwood Lake
- Whitefish Creek
- Drink Lake

== See also ==
- List of rivers of Alberta
- Hudson Bay drainage basin
