= Jayjay Lake =

Lake in Saskatchewan, Canada

- Location in Saskatchewan Jayjay Lake (Canada)
- Location: Northern Administration District, Saskatchewan
- Coordinates: 54.5002°N 104.2338°W
- Part of: Saskatchewan River drainage basin
- River sources: Cub Hills
- Primary outflows: Jayjay Creek
- Basin countries: Canada
- Surface area: 178 ha (440 acres)
- Shore length^{1}: 7 km (4.3 mi)
- Surface elevation: 410 m (1,350 ft)
- Settlements: None
- ^{1} Shore length is not a well-defined measure.

Jayjay Lake is a teardrop-shaped lake in the Canadian province of Saskatchewan. It is in the Northern Saskatchewan Administration District and access is from Highway 165. The lake is situated at the north-eastern slopes of the Cub Hills in the Mid-Boreal Uplands Ecoregion. It is surrounded by muskeg in a boreal forest of pine, birch, aspen, and spruce.

Jayjay Lake is within the Sturgeon-Weir River watershed. Sturgeon-Weir River is a tributary of the Saskatchewan River. Jayjay Creek flows out of Jayjay Lake at its north end and flows south-east into Big Sandy Lake.

== Jayjay Lake Recreation Site ==
Jayjay Lake Recreation Site (54.5136°N 104.2256°W) is a provincial recreation site on the eastern shore of Jayjay Lake. There is free camping and lake access for fishing and other water sports. The lake is restricted to non-motorised boats only.

== Fish species ==
Fish commonly found in Jayjay Lake include yellow perch and northern pike.

== See also ==
- List of lakes of Saskatchewan
- Tourism in Saskatchewan
