= Knee Lake 192B =

Indian reserve in Saskatchewan, Canada

Coordinates: 55°51′59″N 107°02′07″W

- Indian reserve
- Knee Lake Indian Reserve No. 192B
- Location in Saskatchewan
- First Nation: English River
- Country: Canada
- Province: Saskatchewan

Area
  - Total: 487.2 ha (1,204 acres)

Knee Lake 192B is an Indian reserve of the English River First Nation in Saskatchewan. It is about 44 kilometres (27 mi) north-northwest of Pinehouse on the northern shore of Knee Lake. Knee Lake is a large lake along the course of the Churchill River.

== See also ==
- List of Indian reserves in Saskatchewan
