= Île-à-la-Crosse 192E =

Indian reserve in Saskatchewan, Canada

Coordinates: 55°27′21″N 107°46′26″W

- Indian reserve
- Île-à-la-Crosse Indian Reserve No. 192E
- Location in Saskatchewan
- First Nation: English River
- Country: Canada
- Province: Saskatchewan

Area
  - Total: 6 ha (15 acres)

Île-à-la-Crosse 192E is an Indian reserve of the English River First Nation in Saskatchewan. It is 8 kilometres (5.0 mi) east of the village of Île-à-la-Crosse, on the eastern shore of Lac Île-à-la-Crosse at the mouth of the Beaver River.

== See also ==
- List of Indian reserves in Saskatchewan
