= Louis Primeau =

18th century fur trader in Canada

Louis Primeau or Primo (fl. 1749–1800) was one of the first European fur traders on the Churchill River in Canada. Primeau Lake along the course of said river in northern Saskatchewan is named after him. Little is known of his youth. Morton says that he was born in Quebec of an English father and French mother, but the DCB does not repeat this.

== Career ==
Toward the end of the French period in the 18th century, Louis Primeau was trading on the Saskatchewan River at the far western edge of trade and exploration. He spent much time with the Indians. When the French and Indian War broke out in 1756, as the North American front of the Seven Years' War between Britain and France, most of the French officers were recalled to Quebec. But, Primeau stayed in the west and tried to maintain the fur trade.

Following the war and victory by the British in 1763, the Montreal trade had broken down. Primeau went to York Factory and joined the Hudson's Bay Company (HBC), a British business. From 1765 to 1772 he wintered inland at uncertain locations. In 1767 he was reported to be on the Beaver River — a major tributary of the Churchill River. In 1768 venereal disease forced him to remain at York Factory. When "pedlars" (English-speaking Montreal traders) began appearing in the interior, he reported their movements and recommended that the HBC build posts inland. Because of his French background, the HBC did not fully trust him but needed his woodland skills. In 1772 he and Isaac Batt escorted 160 Indian canoes to York Factory, but before reaching that point, all but 35 of these were diverted to the Pedlar post on Cedar Lake in Manitoba.

In May 1772, he deserted to the Pedlars and went to Montreal, where he entered the service of one of the Frobishers. In 1773–74 he was with Joseph Frobisher on Cumberland Lake near the future HBC post of Cumberland House, Saskatchewan. In 1774 he and Frobisher went north up the Sturgeon-Weir River to Frog Portage, where he intercepted the Athabasca Indians coming down the Churchill River to trade with the HBC at Churchill, Manitoba. This loss was one of the reasons that the HBC began to move inland. He was at Frog Portage for three winters. In 1777 Primeau built a post upriver on the Churchill at Lac Île-à-la-Crosse, went down to Montreal, and was back at Lac Île-à-la-Crosse the next year.

Little is known of his subsequent career. Primeau was on the Kississing River in 1786. He may have been the Primeau who was in charge of the North West Company's rival post at Cumberland House in 1798. He is last recorded as being on the Saskatchewan River in 1800. He was important for helping to open the route to Lake Athabasca and as one of those who transmitted the skills of the coureurs des bois to the English-speaking trappers of the North West Company and Hudson's Bay Company. He was one of the men who scouted the interior for the HBC before the company began to build inland posts.

== See also ==
- North American fur trade
