= Beauval Forks 192O =

Indian reserve in Saskatchewan, Canada

Coordinates: 55°06′04″N 107°42′28″W

- Indian reserve
- Beauval Forks Indian Reserve No. 192O
- Location in Saskatchewan
- First Nation: English River
- Country: Canada
- Province: Saskatchewan

Area
  - Total: 1.4 ha (3.5 acres)

Beauval Forks 192O is an Indian reserve of the English River First Nation in Saskatchewan.

== See also ==
- List of Indian reserves in Saskatchewan
