= Leaf Rapids 192P =

Indian reserve in Saskatchewan, Canada

Coordinates: 56°00′48″N 107°36′27″W

- Indian reserve
- Leaf Rapids Indian Reserve No. 192P
- Location in Saskatchewan
- First Nation: English River
- Country: Canada
- Province: Saskatchewan

Area
  - Total: 227.5 ha (562 acres)

Leaf Rapids 192P is an Indian reserve of the English River First Nation in Saskatchewan.

== See also ==
- List of Indian reserves in Saskatchewan
