= Elak Dase 192A =

Indian reserve in Saskatchewan, Canada

Coordinates: 55°52′27″N 106°45′16″W

- Indian reserve
- Elak Dase Indian Reserve No. 192A
- Location in Saskatchewan
- First Nation: English River
- Country: Canada
- Province: Saskatchewan

Area
  - Total: 1,390.5 ha (3,436 acres)

Elak Dase 192A is an Indian reserve of the English River First Nation in Saskatchewan. It is 27 miles southeast of Pine River.

== See also ==
- List of Indian reserves in Saskatchewan
