= Cable Bay 192N =

Indian reserve in Saskatchewan, Canada

Coordinates: 57°22′03″N 107°09′37″W

- Indian reserve
- Cable Bay Indian Reserve No. 192N
- Location in Saskatchewan
- First Nation: English River
- Country: Canada
- Province: Saskatchewan

Area
  - Total: 1,071.4 ha (2,647 acres)

Cable Bay 192N is an Indian reserve of the English River First Nation in Saskatchewan.

== See also ==
- List of Indian reserves in Saskatchewan
