= English River 192H =

Indian reserve in Saskatchewan, Canada

Coordinates: 56°20′05″N 107°20′09″W

- Indian reserve
- English River Indian Reserve No. 192H
- Location in Saskatchewan
- First Nation: English River
- Country: Canada
- Province: Saskatchewan

Area
  - Total: 42.9 ha (106 acres)

English River 192H is an Indian reserve of the English River First Nation in Saskatchewan. It is an island in Porter Lake.

== See also ==
- List of Indian reserves in Saskatchewan
