= Barkwell Bay 192I =

Indian reserve in Saskatchewan, Canada

Coordinates: 57°36′11″N 106°04′25″W

- Indian reserve
- Barkwell Bay Indian Reserve No. 192I
- Location in Saskatchewan
- First Nation: English River
- Country: Canada
- Province: Saskatchewan

Area
  - Total: 2,344 ha (5,790 acres)

Barkwell Bay 192I is an Indian reserve of the English River First Nation in Saskatchewan at the northern end of Cree Lake.

== See also ==
- List of Indian reserves in Saskatchewan
