= Primeau Lake 192F =

Indian reserve in Saskatchewan, Canada

Coordinates: 55°53′28″N 107°14′57″W

- Indian reserve
- Primeau Lake Indian Reserve No. 192F
- Location in Saskatchewan
- First Nation: English River
- Country: Canada
- Province: Saskatchewan

Area
  - Total: 1,690 ha (4,200 acres)

Primeau Lake 192F is an Indian reserve of the English River First Nation in Saskatchewan. It is situated along the Churchill River on a peninsula that separates Dipper Lake and Primeau Lake.

== See also ==
- List of Indian reserves in Saskatchewan
