= Beauval, Saskatchewan =

Village in Saskatchewan, Canada

Beauval ᓰᐲᓯᓯᕽ sîpîsisihk
- Northern village
- Location within Saskatchewan Location within Canada
- Coordinates: 55°08′27″N 107°37′47″W
- Country: Canada
- Province: Saskatchewan
- District: Northern Saskatchewan Administration District
- Settled: 1905
- Post office established: 1910

Government
  - Type: Municipal council
  - Mayor: Nick Daigneault
  - MLA Athabasca: Leroy Laliberte
  - MP Desnethé—Missinippi—Churchill River: Buckley Belanger

Area
  - Land: 14.72 km^{2} (5.68 sq mi)

Population (2021)
  - Total: 685
  - Density: 46.5/km^{2} (120/sq mi)
- Time zone: UTC-6 (UTC)
- Postal code: S0M 0G0
- Area code(s): 306
- Highways: Highway 165

Beauval (Plains Cree: ᓰᐲᓯᓯᕽ, romanized: sîpîsisihk) is a northern village located in Northern Saskatchewan, near Lac Île-à-la-Crosse. It was founded in the early 20th century as a Roman Catholic mission and as a transportation centre.

Highway 165 goes through the community. Highway 918 three kilometres east leads north to Patuanak. Eight kilometres east is the hamlet of Lac La Plonge on Lac La Plonge. Eight kilometres west where Highway 165 joins Highway 155 is Beauval Forks. The Beauval Airport along with several businesses are located there.

Beauval is situated in the valley of the Beaver River hence the name "beautiful valley" or "beau val" in French. The population of Beauval was 756 in 2011.

== History ==
The earliest known settler was Philip Yew who arrived in 1905, by 1907, others have arrived, mainly from Dore Lake. In 1910, Alexander Laliberte opened a fur trading store to serve the local trappers.

In 1933, the Hudson's Bay Company (HBC) opened a trading post in Beauval, serving as an outpost of the Île-à-la-Crosse post for 2 years until it became a full post.

In 1959, the post became part of the HBC Northern Stores Department. HBC divested this department in 1987 to The North West Company, which still operates a Northern Store in Beauval.

In 1969, the community established the 'Beauval Local Community Authority', which elected council to oversee bylaws, collect taxes and maintain law and order. Unlike most Northern Saskatchewan communities, Beauval has seen a population growth over the years. By the end of the Second World War, Beauval had a population of approximately 350 residents, today the population is over 1,000 residents with an additional 200 living in the surrounding area.

=== Beauval Residential School ===
La Plonge 192 (Indian Reserve) where the Beauval Residential School was located is across the river from Beauval and had 115 residents in 2011. La Plonge 192 is part of the English River Dene Nation.

Beauval Indian Residential School opened in 1895 and closed in 1983. It then became the Meadow Lake Tribal Council's Beauval Indian Education Centre which closed in 1995. The building has since been demolished.

A fire in 1927 and a flu epidemic in 1936 took the lives of many of the students.

== Demographics ==
In the 2021 Census of Population conducted by Statistics Canada, Beauval had a population of 685 living in 232 of its 279 total private dwellings, a change of 7% from its 2016 population of 640. With a land area of 14.72 km^{2} (5.68 sq mi), it had a population density of 46.5/km^{2} (120.5/sq mi) in 2021.

Canada census – Beauval community profile

	2021	2016	2011
Population	685 (+7.0% from 2016)	640 (-15.3% from 2011)	756 (-6.2% from 2006)
Land area	14.72 km^{2} (5.68 sq mi)	12.88 km^{2} (4.97 sq mi)	6.71 km^{2} (2.59 sq mi)
Population density	46.5/km^{2} (120/sq mi)	49.7/km^{2} (129/sq mi)	112.6/km^{2} (292/sq mi)
Median age	35.2 (M: 31.6, F: 38.4)	28.6 (M: 25.4, F: 35.0)	26.4 (M: 26.0, F: 27.2)
Private dwellings	279 (total) 232 (occupied)	293 (total) 204 (occupied)	281 (total)
Median household income	$83,000	$79,104

References: 2021 2016 2011

== Economy ==
Today, Beauval derives its economic resources from limited commercial fishing, very little trapping, local and provincial government subsidies, grants and programs, the mines, local businesses and the school. Tourism and recreation activities also provides economic resources.

== Transportation ==
The community is served by Beauval Airport. There are dirt roads which connect Beauval to neighbouring communities.

== See also ==
- List of Indian residential schools in Canada
