= Primeau Lake =

Lake in Saskatchewan, Canada

- Location in Saskatchewan Primeau Lake (Canada)
- Location: Northern Administration District, Saskatchewan
- Coordinates: 55.8533°N 107.174°W
- Etymology: Louis Primeau
- Part of: Churchill River drainage basin
- Primary inflows: Churchill River
- Primary outflows: Churchill River
- Basin countries: Canada
- Surface area: 5,053 ha (12,490 acres)
- Shore length^{1}: 90 km (56 mi)
- Settlements: None
- ^{1} Shore length is not a well-defined measure.

Primeau Lake is a large, irregularly-shaped lake along the course of the Churchill River in the Canadian province of Saskatchewan. The Churchill River is largely a series of interconnected lakes that begins at Churchill Lake in north-western Saskatchewan and empties into the Hudson Bay at Churchill, Manitoba. The lake is about 56 kilometres (35 mi) north-west of the community of Pinehouse. It is surrounded by boreal forest in the Canadian Shield. The lake was named after Louis Primeau, an 18th century fur trader.

Upstream along the Churchill River is Dipper Lake and downstream is Knee Lake. Primeau Lake 192F Indian reserve is situated at the western shore, near where the Churchill enters the lake. At the eastern end — at the lake's outflow — is Jones Peninsula. The peninsula was named after Archie Walker Jones through the geomemorial naming program, which names geographical features after Canadians who lost theirs lives in the service of Canada.

== Fish species ==
Fish species commonly found in Primeau Lake include walleye, lake trout, northern pike, cisco, lake whitefish, and burbot.

== See also ==
- List of lakes of Saskatchewan
