= Flatstone Lake 192L =

Indian reserve in Saskatchewan, Canada

Coordinates: 56°14′25″N 107°42′40″W

- Indian reserve
- Flatstone Lake Indian Reserve No. 192L
- Location in Saskatchewan
- First Nation: English River
- Country: Canada
- Province: Saskatchewan

Area
  - Total: 230.5 ha (570 acres)

Flatstone Lake 192L is an Indian reserve of the English River First Nation in Saskatchewan.

== See also ==
- List of Indian reserves in Saskatchewan
