= Slush Lake 192Q =

Indian reserve in Saskatchewan, Canada

Coordinates: 57°32′20″N 105°40′36″W

- Indian reserve
- Slush Lake Indian Reserve No. 192Q
- Location in Saskatchewan
- First Nation: English River
- Country: Canada
- Province: Saskatchewan

Area
  - Total: 683.1 ha (1,688 acres)

Slush Lake 192Q is an Indian reserve of the English River First Nation in Saskatchewan.

== See also ==
- List of Indian reserves in Saskatchewan
