= Grasswoods 192J =

Indian reserve in Saskatchewan, Canada

Coordinates: 52°03′54″N 106°36′21″W

- Indian reserve
- Grasswoods Indian Reserve No. 192J
- Location in Saskatchewan
- First Nation: English River
- Country: Canada
- Province: Saskatchewan

Area
  - Total: 54.4 ha (134 acres)

Grasswoods 192J is an Indian reserve of the English River First Nation in Saskatchewan.

== See also ==
- List of Indian reserves in Saskatchewan
