= Dipper Lake =

Lake in Saskatchewan, Canada

- Location in Saskatchewan Dipper Lake (Canada)
- Location: Northern Administration District, Saskatchewan
- Coordinates: 55.9334°N 107.334°W
- Part of: Churchill River drainage basin
- Primary inflows: Churchill River
- River sources: Canadian Shield
- Primary outflows: Churchill River
- Basin countries: Canada
- Surface area: 6,438 ha (15,910 acres)
- Shore length^{1}: 73 km (45 mi)
- Surface elevation: 396 m (1,299 ft)
- Settlements: None
- ^{1} Shore length is not a well-defined measure.

Dipper Lake is a large lake along the course of the Churchill River in the Canadian province of Saskatchewan. The Churchill River is largely a series of interconnected lakes that begins at Churchill Lake in north-western Saskatchewan and empties into the Hudson Bay at Churchill, Manitoba. Upstream from Dipper Lake along the Churchill River is Shagwenaw Lake and downstream is Primeau Lake. The lake is about 65 kilometres (40 mi) north-west of the community of Pinehouse and is surrounded by boreal forest in the Canadian Shield.

Primeau Lake Indian reserve is situated at the eastern end of Dipper Lake on a peninsula that separates it from Primeau Lake. Dipper Rapids Indian reserve encompasses much of the western shore. Also at the western end of Dipper Lake is Golden Wally Outfitters.

== Fish species ==
Fish species commonly found in Dipper Lake include walleye, northern pike, cisco, lake whitefish, and burbot.

== See also ==
- List of lakes of Saskatchewan
