= Cable Bay 192M =

Indian reserve in Saskatchewan, Canada

Coordinates: 57°21′37″N 107°08′42″W

- Indian reserve
- Cable Bay Indian Reserve No. 192M
- Location in Saskatchewan
- First Nation: English River
- Country: Canada
- Province: Saskatchewan

Area
  - Total: 538.3 ha (1,330 acres)

Cable Bay 192M is an Indian reserve of the English River First Nation in Saskatchewan. It is on the south-west corner of Cree Lake adjacent to Cree Lake 192G Indian reserve.

== See also ==
- List of Indian reserves in Saskatchewan
