= Lac La Plonge, Saskatchewan =

Community in Saskatchewan, Canada

Coordinates: 55.046°N 107.196°W

Location of Lac La Plonge in Saskatchewan

Lac La Plonge is a hamlet in Saskatchewan. It is located on the north shore of Lac la Plonge, a glacial lake, within the Canadian Shield and the boreal forest.

== See also ==
- List of communities in Saskatchewan
