= Cree Lake 192G =

Indian reserve in Saskatchewan, Canada

Coordinates: 57°23′06″N 107°03′52″W

- Indian reserve
- Cree Lake Indian Reserve No. 192G
- Location in Saskatchewan
- First Nation: English River
- Country: Canada
- Province: Saskatchewan

Area
  - Total: 1,607.4 ha (3,972 acres)

Cree Lake 192G is an Indian reserve of the English River First Nation in Saskatchewan on the south-west corner of Cree Lake adjacent to Cable Bay 192M Indian reserve.

== See also ==
- List of Indian reserves in Saskatchewan
