= Mawdsley Lake 192R =

Indian reserve in Saskatchewan, Canada

Coordinates: 56°46′09″N 106°09′01″W

- Indian reserve
- Mawdsley Lake Indian Reserve No. 192R
- Location in Saskatchewan
- First Nation: English River
- Country: Canada
- Province: Saskatchewan

Area
  - Total: 1,195.6 ha (2,954 acres)

Mawdsley Lake 192R is an Indian reserve of the English River First Nation in Saskatchewan.

== See also ==
- List of Indian reserves in Saskatchewan
