= Dipper Rapids 192C =

Indian reserve in Saskatchewan, Canada

Coordinates: 55°55′11″N 107°22′48″W

- Indian reserve
- Dipper Rapids Indian Reserve No. 192C
- Location in Saskatchewan
- First Nation: English River
- Country: Canada
- Province: Saskatchewan

Area
  - Total: 831.3 ha (2,054 acres)

Dipper Rapids 192C is an Indian reserve of the English River First Nation in Saskatchewan, Canada. It is situated along the western shore of Dipper Lake.

== See also ==
- List of Indian reserves in Saskatchewan
