= Haultain Lake 192K =

Indian reserve in Saskatchewan, Canada

Coordinates: 56°49′15″N 106°17′35″W

- Indian reserve
- Haultain Lake Indian Reserve No. 192K
- Location in Saskatchewan
- First Nation: English River
- Country: Canada
- Province: Saskatchewan

Area
  - Total: 201.2 ha (497 acres)

Haultain Lake 192K is an Indian reserve of the English River First Nation in Saskatchewan.

== See also ==
- List of Indian reserves in Saskatchewan
