= Pinehouse =

Village in Saskatchewan, Canada

Pinehouse ᒥᓇᐦᐃᑯ ᐚᐢᑲᐦᐃᑲᓂᕽ minahiko-wâskahikanihk
- Northern village
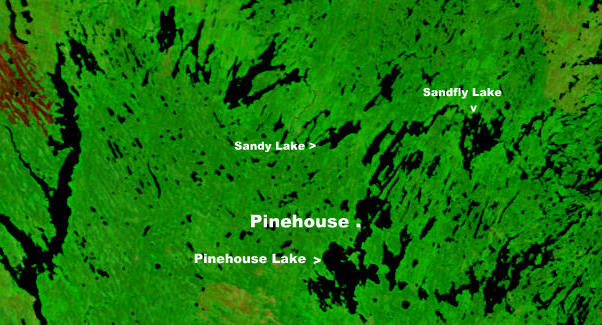
- Location of Pinehouse on a NASA image of Pinehouse Lake

- Location of Pinehouse in Saskatchewan Pinehouse (Canada)
- Coordinates: 55°30′49″N 106°35′55″W
- Country: Canada
- Province: Saskatchewan
- District: Northern Saskatchewan Administration District

Government
  - Mayor: Mike Natomagan
  - MLA Athabasca: Vacant
  - MP Desnethé—Missinippi—Churchill River: Gary Vidal

Area
  - Land: 6.84 km^{2} (2.64 sq mi)

Population (2016)
  - Total: 1,074
  - Density: 142.9/km^{2} (370/sq mi)
- Time zone: UTC−6 (Central Standard Time)
  - Summer (DST): UTC−5
- Postal code: S0J 2B0
- Highways: Highway 914
- Post office established: 1949

Pinehouse (Woods Cree: ᒥᓇᐦᐃᑯ ᐚᐢᑲᐦᐃᑲᓂᕽ, romanized: minahiko-wâskahikanihk, lit. 'at pine house') is a northern village located in the boreal forest of Saskatchewan on the western shore of Pinehouse Lake within the Canadian Shield.

Travelling by road from Pinehouse, the Key Lake mine is 223 kilometres (139 mi) north, Prince Albert is 346 kilometres (215 mi) south, La Ronge is 214 kilometres (133 mi) east and Beauval, the closest community, is 107 kilometres (66 mi) west. Highway 914 passes through the community and Pinehouse is the only established community along this road.

There were 1,074 residents in 2016. Cree was the mother tongue of 630 of the residents in 2011. The mayor of this predominantly Cree community is Mike Natomagan.

== History ==
There was a North West Company post and a rival post near the mouth of the Tippo River called Lac des Serpents (Lake of Serpents or Snake Lake) in 1786.

The Hudson's Bay Company had a post at the north end of Pinehouse Lake called the Souris River Post. It was located about 2 kilometres (1.2 mi) west of the mouth of the Belanger River once known as the Souris River. Most of the residents of this settlement which numbered about 100 people in the 1920s and 1930s eventually moved to Pinehouse. The Souris River Post near Sandfly Lake operated from 1875 to 1939. The Census of 1906 called this settlement then numbering 73 people Souris River on the Churchill.

Missionaries first visited the Dene population of Pinehouse Lake in 1899. A smallpox epidemic killed around half of the population of the area in 1900-1901. Some survivors moved up the Churchill River towards Patuanak and downriver to Stanley Mission further depleting the area population.

The 1906 Canada Census uses the name Serpent Lake on the Churchill to describe the community that then had about 11 people which included the family of Samuel and Veronique Misponass.

A townsite was established in the 1940s and a Roman Catholic church (St. Dominic) was built in 1944 followed by a store and in 1948 a school. In 1954 the community was renamed Pinehouse Lake. Pinehouse was originally named Snake Lake (kinêpiko-sâkahikan in Cree). Although officially named Pinehouse, numerous official sources including the official road map of Saskatchewan issued by the province, identifies the community by the name Pinehouse Lake.

Eighty houses were built between 1967 and 1980 and Pinehouse was connected to the power grid in 1984 replacing a diesel generator set up around 1970. The first road to the community was built from Highway 2 in 1977.

== Demographics ==
In the 2021 Census of Population conducted by Statistics Canada, Pinehouse had a population of 1,013 living in 266 of its 302 total private dwellings, a change of −5.7% from its 2016 population of 1,074. With a land area of 6.77 km^{2} (2.61 sq mi), it had a population density of 149.6/km^{2} (387.5/sq mi) in 2021.

Historical populations
Year	Pop.	±%
1986	682	—
1991	820	+20.2%
1996	922	+12.4%
2001	1,038	+12.6%
2006	1,076	+3.7%
2011	978	−9.1%
2016	1,074	+9.8%

== Infrastructure ==
Pinehouse is home to a store, a gas station, a Royal Canadian Mounted Police detachment, the northern village's office and a health clinic. The community is served by Pinehouse Lake Airport. The community is also home to the Pinehouse Photography Club, a non-profit organization that supports and encourages youth mental health prevention through therapeutic photography.

The ice skating arena features an artificial ice plant.

== Education ==
Pinehouse has two schools — Minahik Waskahigan Elementary School and Minahik Waskahigan High School. The schools are in the Northern Lights School Division #113 and have an enrolment of 400 students and a support staff of 40.

== See also ==
- List of communities in Saskatchewan
- List of villages in Saskatchewan
- List of Indian reserves in Saskatchewan
