= Wapachewunak 192D =

Indian reserve in Saskatchewan, Canada

Coordinates: 55°57′51″N 107°44′43″W

Wapachewunak
- Indian reserve
- Wapachewunak Indian Reserve No. 192D
- Location in Saskatchewan
- First Nation: English River
- Country: Canada
- Province: Saskatchewan

Area
  - Total: 3,180.6 ha (7,859 acres)

Wapachewunak 192D is an Indian reserve of the English River First Nation in Saskatchewan. It is along the course of the Churchill River, between Lac Île-à-la-Crosse and Shagwenaw Lake.

== See also ==
- List of Indian reserves in Saskatchewan
