= Meadow Lake Tribal Council =

Tribal council in Saskatchewan, Canada

- Abbreviation: MLTC
- Formation: 1981
- Headquarters: Meadow Lake
- Location: Canada
- Region served: Northwestern Saskatchewan
- Tribal Chief: Richard Ben
- Cree Vice Chief: Richard Derocher
- Dene Vice Chief: Lawrence McIntyre
- Website: https://www.mltc.net/
- Formerly called: The Meadow Lake District Chiefs

The Meadow Lake Tribal Council (MLTC) is a tribal council representing nine First Nation band governments in the province of Saskatchewan. The council is based in Meadow Lake, Saskatchewan.

== Services ==
MLTC provides and coordinates health care, education, and social services. It also provides some policing services for member nations. It owns a series of companies which are intended to provide employment for members and economic opportunities for the communities it serves. The First Nation members are scattered around northern Saskatchewan.

During the COVID-19 pandemic, MLTC received a $387,000 grant from the Public Health Agency of Canada's Immunization Partnership Fund to increase rates of COVID-19 vaccination and decrease vaccine hesitancy among Meadow Lake First Nation communities.

== Staff ==
Executive Management
#	Position	Name
1	Tribal Chief	Richard Ben
2	Cree Vice Chief	Richard Derocher
3	Dene Vice Chief	Lawrence McIntyre
3	Senior Director of Finance & Corporate Services	Isabelle Opikokew
4	Chief Executive Officer	Gordon Iron
6	Senior Director of Programs	Christine Durocher
7	Senior Director of Education	Patricia St.Denis
8	Senior Director of Health and Social Development	Marcia Mirasty
9	Senior Director of Child & Family Services	Onyeka Arinze
10	Office Manager	Diana Tracz
11	Administrative Assistant	Kali Daniels
12	Receptionist	Charity Morin

== Members ==
- Birch Narrows First Nation see Turnor Lake, Saskatchewan
- Buffalo River Dene Nation see Dillon, Saskatchewan
- Canoe Lake Cree Nation see Canoe Narrows, Saskatchewan
- Clearwater River Dene Nation
- English River Dene Nation see Patuanak, Saskatchewan
- Flying Dust First Nation
- Island Lake First Nation
- Makwa Sahgaiehcan First Nation
- Waterhen Lake First Nation
