= La Plonge 192 =

Indian reserve in Saskatchewan, Canada

Coordinates: 55°11′26″N 107°35′08″W

- Indian reserve
- La Plonge Indian Reserve No. 192
- Location in Saskatchewan
- First Nation: English River
- Country: Canada
- Province: Saskatchewan

Area
  - Total: 9,487.2 ha (23,443 acres)

Population (2016)
  - Total: 148
  - Density: 1.56/km^{2} (4.04/sq mi)
- Community Well-Being Index: 59

La Plonge 192 is an Indian reserve of the English River First Nation in Saskatchewan, Canada. It is about 19 kilometres (12 mi) south of Île-à-la-Crosse. In the 2016 Canadian Census, it recorded a population of 148 living in 46 of its 51 total private dwellings. In the same year, its Community Well-Being index was calculated at 59 of 100, compared to 58.4 for the average First Nations community and 77.5 for the average non-Indigenous community.

== See also ==
- List of Indian reserves in Saskatchewan
