= Beaver River (Canada) =

River in Western Canada

Beaver River Rivière Castor (French), Amiskwasîpi (Cree)
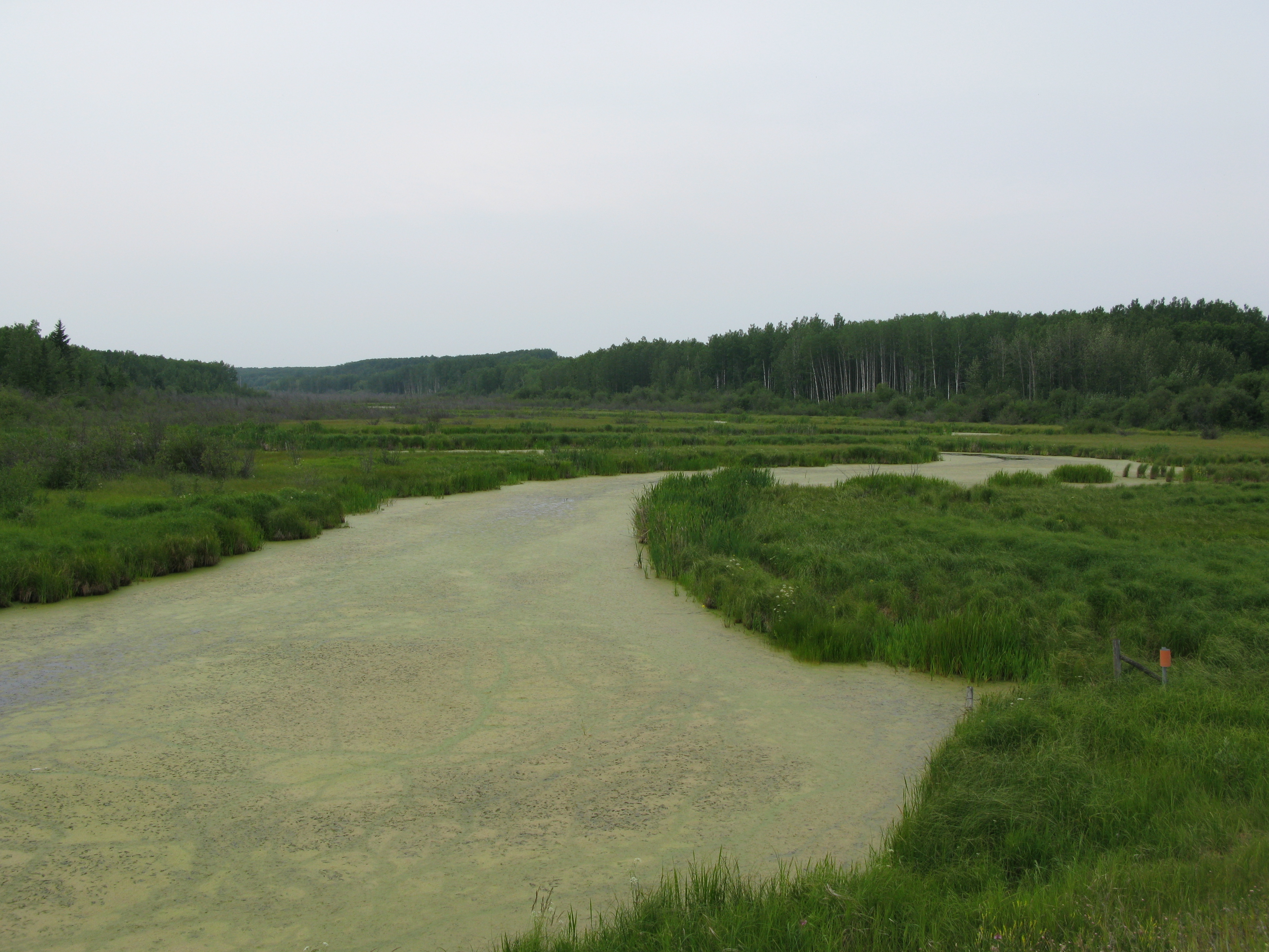
- The Beaver south of Lac La Biche, Alberta

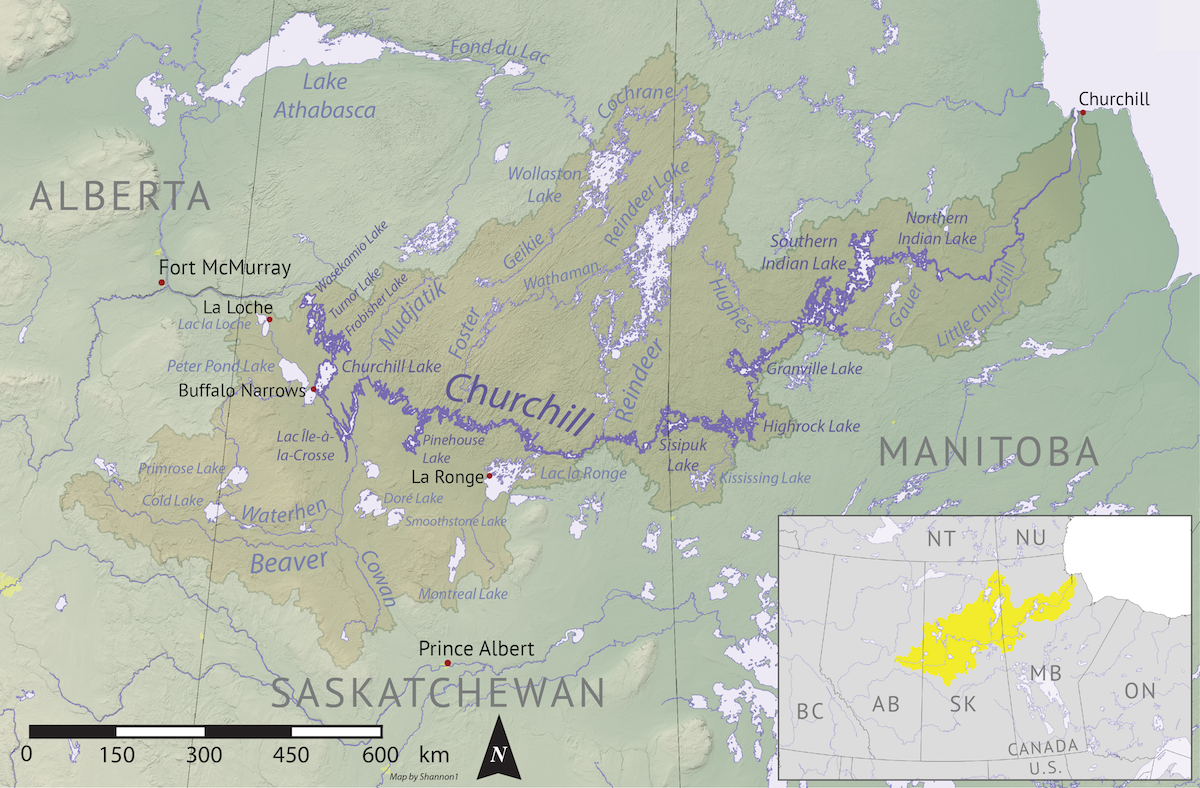
- Churchill River drainage basin

- Location of the mouth in Saskatchewan Beaver River (Canada) (Canada)

Location
- Country: Canada
- Provinces: Alberta; Saskatchewan

Physical characteristics
- Source: Beaver Lake
  - location: Lac La Biche County, Alberta
  - coordinates: 54°43′40″N 111°54′04″W
  - elevation: 618 m (2,028 ft)
- Mouth: Lac Île-à-la-Crosse
  - location: Division 18, Saskatchewan
  - coordinates: 55°25′51″N 107°45′35″W
  - elevation: 421 m (1,381 ft)
- Length: 491 km (305 mi)

Basin features
- River system: Churchill River drainage basin
- Waterfalls: Grand Rapids

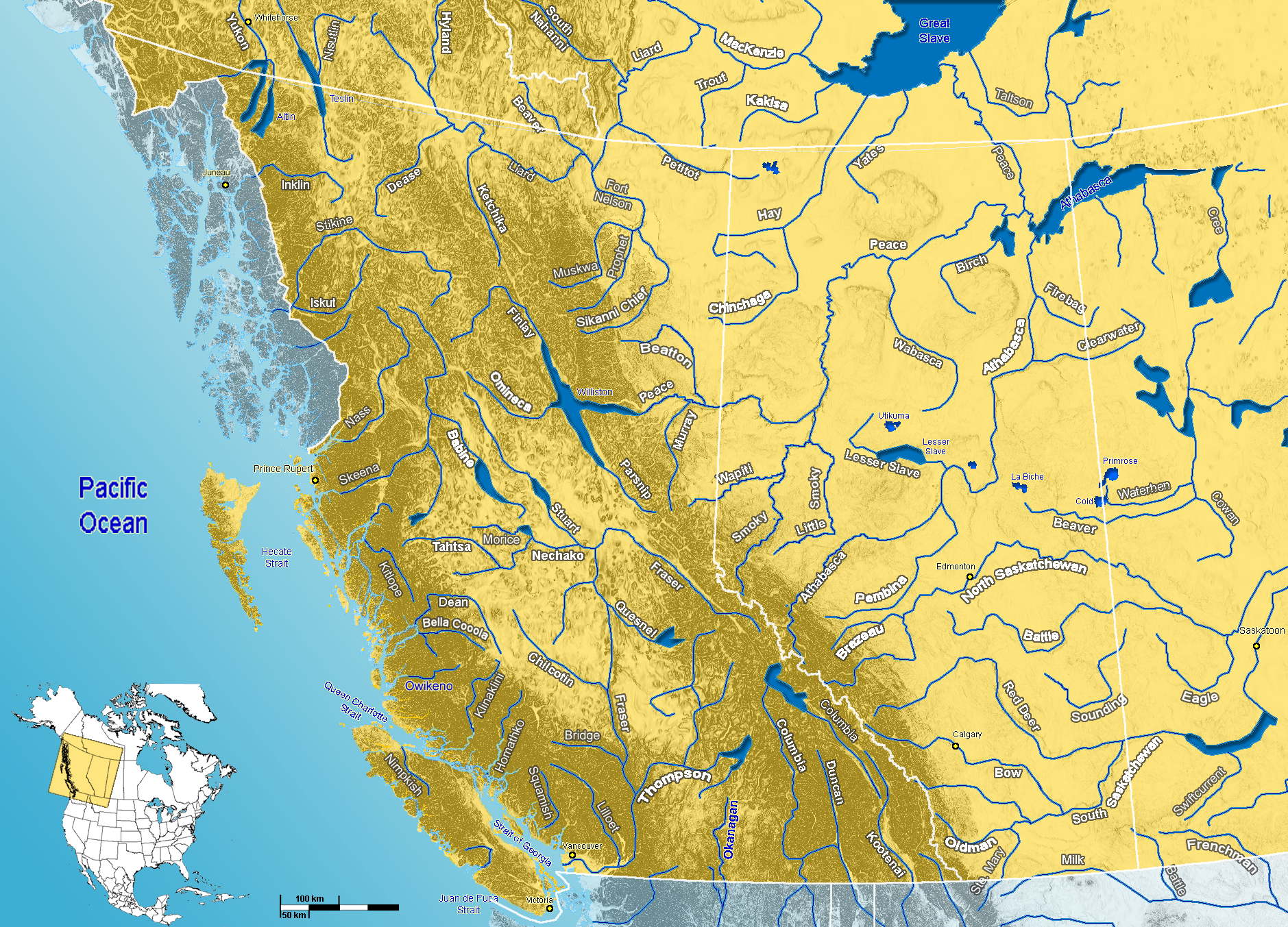
Western Canada rivers

Beaver River is a large river in east-northern Alberta and central Saskatchewan, Canada. It flows east through Alberta and Saskatchewan and then turns sharply north to flow into Lac Île-à-la-Crosse on the Churchill River which flows into Hudson Bay.

Beaver River has a catchment area of 14,500 square kilometres (5,600 sq mi) in Alberta, where it drains the lake system in Lac La Biche County. The total length is 491 kilometres (305 mi). It was first documented on the Turnor map of 1790, and then confirmed on the Harmon map of 1820.

== Basin and course ==
East of the Athabasca River basin and north of the North Saskatchewan River basin, the Beaver River Basin is part of the Churchill River basin.

The east-flowing part passes in and out of the forest zone several times and is approximately parallel to Alberta Highway 55 and Saskatchewan Highway 55. Its source, Beaver Lake is just south of Lac la Biche which drains into the Athabasca. It exits Beaver Lake on the west side and flows south until it receives from the west the Amisk River. The outflow of Moose Lake comes in from the south. It enters Saskatchewan just south of Cold Lake and from Cold Lake the Waterhen River runs just north of and parallel to it. In Saskatchewan it receives from the south-west the outflow of Minnistikwan Lake and then the outflow of Meadow Lake to the south. At the great bend, it receives the north-flowing Green River from Green Lake.

The north-flowing part flows through thinly populated boreal forest. Saskatchewan Highway 155 follows its west bank. It receives from the east Cowan River, which drains Cowan Lake and Delaronde Lake, and from the west the Waterhen River, from the east Doré River draining Doré Lake. The highway leaves the river at Beauval Forks and near Beauval, Saskatchewan it receives the outflow of Lac la Plonge from the east. It continues northward east of the south arm of the lake and enters Lac Île-à-la-Crosse across the lake from the village of Île-à-la-Crosse.

=== Tributaries ===
Tributaries of Beaver River from upper to lower watershed

- Amisk River
- Mooselake River
- Sand River
  - Wolf River
- Manatokan Creek
- Jackfish Creek
- Marie Creek
- Reita Creek
- Redspring Creek
- Vermilion Creek
- Makwa River
  - Horsehead Creek
    - Rabbit Creek
- Herlen River
- Meadow River
  - Chitek River
- Green River
  - Tea Creek
- Cowan River
  - Big River
- Beatty Creek
- Waterhen River
  - Rusty Creek
  - Cold River
    - Martineau River
- Hillyer Creek
- Doré River
  - Sled River (flows into Doré Lake)
  - Olsen Creek
- Rivière la Plonge
- Pine River

== Exploration and fur trade ==
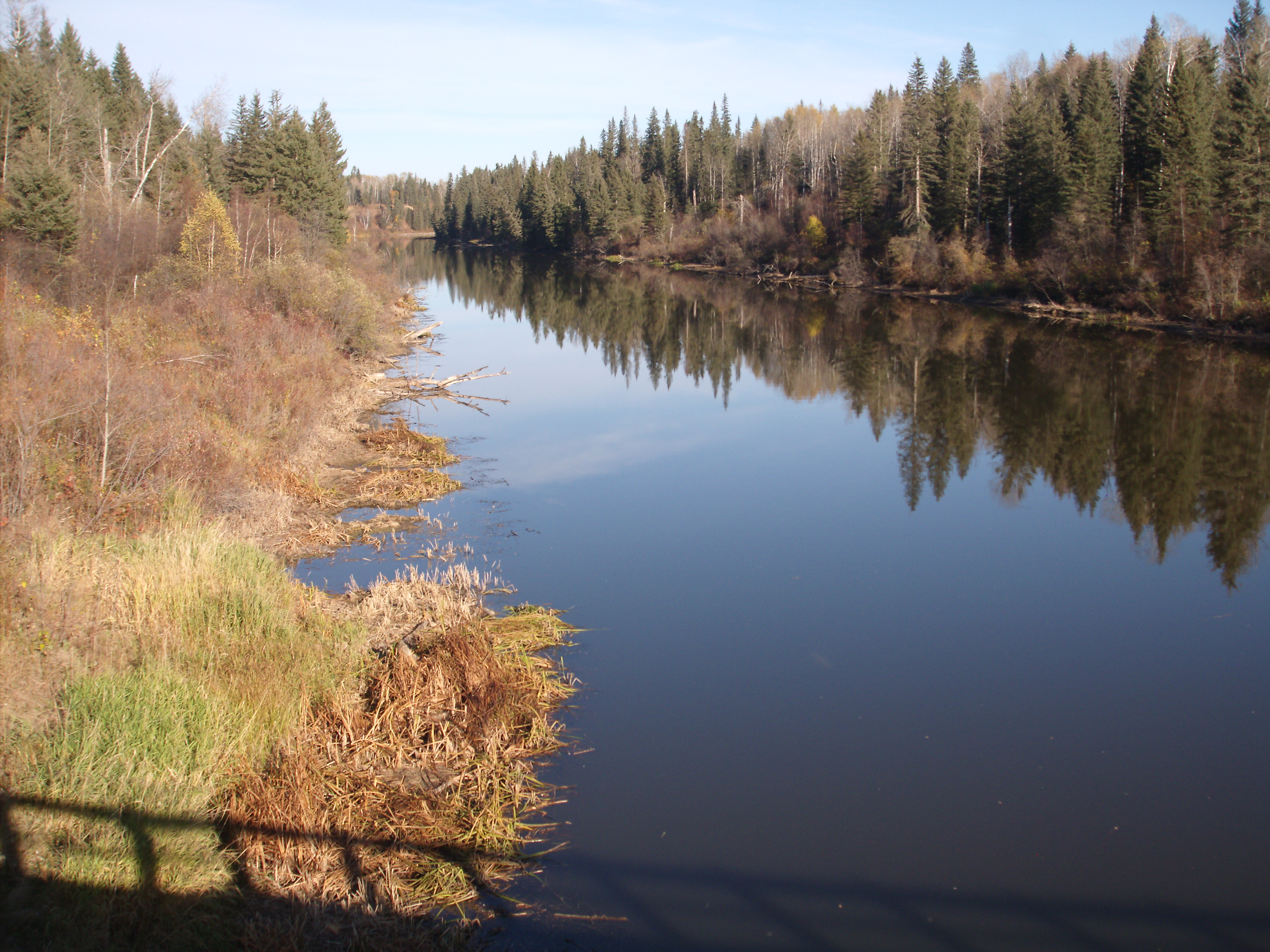
The Beaver River north of Green Lake at the Highway 155 bridge crossing (looking downstream)

The river, or parts of it, is described as poor canoe country. Crews had to drag their canoes over the shallow parts and there was little game. The mouth of the Beaver River is on the main axis of the fur trade. The upper Beaver is about 80 kilometres (50 mi) north of the North Saskatchewan. From at least 1795 buffalo pemmican was brought north to feed the voyageurs on their way to the Athabasca Country. One route led south to the great bend of the Beaver, through Green Lake, Saskatchewan, and over an Indian track to Fort Carlton. In 1875–76 this was replaced by a cart road at about the time steamboats appeared on the Saskatchewan. Another route went further up the Beaver to Moose Lake and by some route to Fort George.

The first European to reach the Beaver may have Louis Primeau in 1767. About 1768 William Pink was on the river. He went north-west from the lower Saskatchewan followed the Beaver west and returned to the Saskatchewan near Edmonton. In 1776 Primeau working for Thomas Frobisher built a post on Lac Île-à-la-Crosse. In 1781 Montreal traders built Cold Lake House near Beaver Crossing. In perhaps 1782 the North West Company built a post on Green Lake. In 1798 David Thompson used the Beaver to reach Lac La Biche. In 1799 the Hudson's Bay Company decided to push west up the Churchill from Frog Portage. In that year they built rival posts on Lac Île-à-la-Crosse and Green Lake. They also built a post above the great bend at Meadow Lake, Saskatchewan, that only lasted two years. There was a great deal of conflict between the two companies until the merger in 1821.

== Conservation, recreation, and development ==
Beaver River flows through a predominantly flat area with rolling and undulating hills, and many lakes are drained through meandering streams into the river; among the larger ones are: Pinehurst Lake, Primrose Lake, and Cold Lake. The Cold Lake Area Weapons Range occupies much of the northern area of the river basin.

Lakeland Provincial Park, Moose Lake Provincial Park, and Cold Lake Provincial Park all lie in the river basin on the Alberta side, while the Meadow Lake Provincial Park protects a large area in Saskatchewan in the Waterhen River watershed.

=== Saskatchewan provincial recreation sites ===
There are three Saskatchewan provincial recreation sites along the river's course. They include Beaver / Cowan Rivers Recreation Site (54.4243°N 107.8568°W), Beatty Lake Recreation Site (54.5108°N 107.8818°W), and Beaver River Recreation Site (54.2965°N 108.6052°W).

== Fish species ==
The fish species include walleye, sauger, yellow perch, northern pike, lake trout, lake whitefish, cisco, white sucker, longnose sucker, and burbot.

== See also ==
- List of rivers of Alberta
- List of rivers of Saskatchewan
- Hudson Bay drainage basin
- North American fur trade
