= Lac Île-à-la-Crosse =

Lake in Saskatchewan, Canada

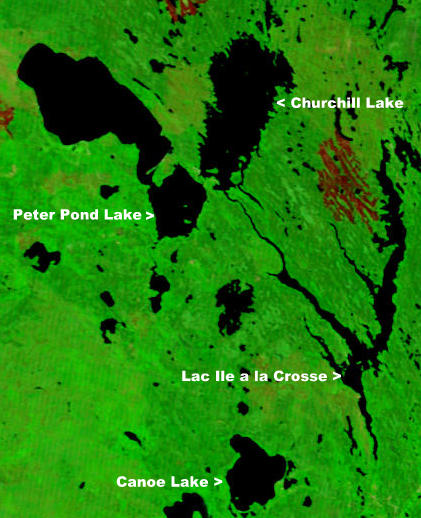
- NASA map showing Lac Île-à-la-Crosse

- Location in Saskatchewan Lac Île-à-la-Crosse (Canada)
- Location: Northern Administration District, Saskatchewan
- Coordinates: 55°26′40″N 107°50′55″W
- Lake type: Glacial lake
- Etymology: Lacrosse
- Part of: Churchill River drainage basin
- Primary inflows: Churchill River; Beaver River
- Primary outflows: Churchill River
- Basin countries: Canada
- Surface area: 46,737.5 ha (115,491 acres)
- Max. depth: 31.1 m (102 ft)
- Shore length^{1}: 1,151.3 km (715.4 mi)
- Surface elevation: 416 m (1,365 ft)
- Islands: Big Island; Fidlers Island; Ile aux Trembles
- Settlements: Île-à-la-Crosse; Patuanak
- ^{1} Shore length is not a well-defined measure.

Lac Île-à-la-Crosse is a Y-shaped lake in the north-central region of the Canadian province of Saskatchewan along the course of the Churchill River. At the centre of the "Y" is the village of Île-à-la-Crosse, the second oldest community in Saskatchewan. Situated at the confluence of the Churchill and Beaver Rivers, the lake was an important fur trading centre in the 18th and 19th centuries. The lake, and the community of Île-à-la-Crosse, are named after the game of Lacrosse as French voyageurs had witnessed local Indians playing the game on an island in the lake.

Lac Île-à-la-Crosse is reached from the south by Highway 155, which follows the Beaver River. On the north side of the mouth of the Beaver River is the Île-à-la-Crosse Indian reserve. On the south side is Fort Black, the site of a former North West Trading Company Post. Highway 918 runs along the eastern shore and provides access to Patuanak and the Wapachewunak Indian reserve. The community of Île-à-la-Crosse is reached from Highway 908. There are two airports — Île-à-la-Crosse Airport and Patuanak Airport — on the lake's shores. Around the lake there are recreational opportunities such as camping, boating, swimming, and fishing.

== Description ==
Lac Île-à-la-Crosse is a large, Y-shaped lake along the course of the Churchill River. The north-west arm of the "Y" is called Aubichon Arm while the Y's stem is called South Bay. The lake has an area of 46,737.5 hectares (115,491 acres), is 31.1 metres (102 ft) deep, and has a 1,151.3-kilometre (715.4 mi) long shoreline. Besides the Churchill, the other major inflow is the Beaver River.

The Churchill River is largely a series of interconnected lakes that begins at Churchill Lake in north-western Saskatchewan and empties into the Hudson Bay at Churchill, Manitoba. The river enters Lac Île-à-la-Crosse via MacBeth Channel at Aubichon Arm. Upstream, the Churchill River's watershed leads north-west to Athabasca Country passing through Churchill Lake, Peter Pond Lake, Lac La Loche, and then on to the Methye Portage, which leads to Lake Athabasca. The Churchill River exits the north-east arm of the lake and flows into Shagwenaw Lake.

The Beaver River flows into Lac Île-à-la-Crosse from the south and enters on the east-central side, just east of South Bay. The headwaters of the Beaver are south-west between the upper Athabasca River and the upper North Saskatchewan River in the Lac la Biche area in Alberta.

== Fur trading posts ==
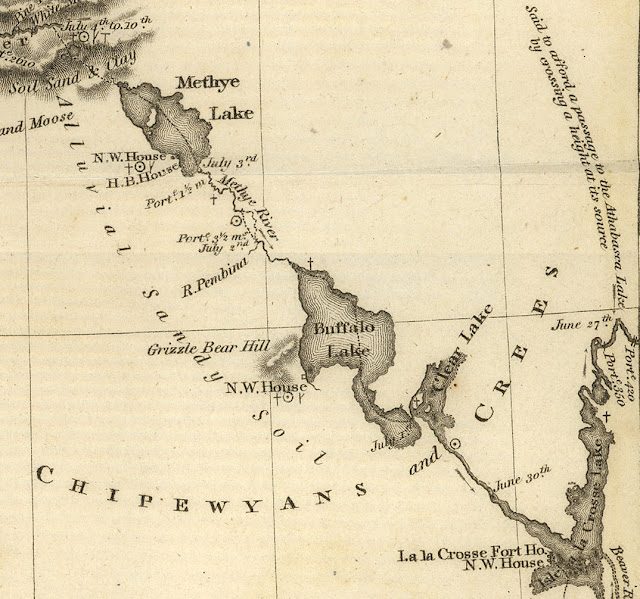
John Franklin's Coppermine Expedition map of 1819–1822 showing the fur trade route from Île-à-la-Crosse to Methye Portage

Given its strategic location, it was a natural stop for early canoe trade routes. Once trade was developed, pemmican was carried up the Beaver River from the buffalo country on the North Saskatchewan. In 1767, Louis Primeau, in the service of the Hudson's Bay Company, was reported on the Beaver River which means he must have passed through the lake. In 1776 Primeau, working for Thomas Frobisher of Montreal, built a post on the lake.

In 1776–77, Peter Pond wintered here, as did Thomas Frobisher. Around 1786, the Scottish explorer Alexander Mackenzie, working for Gregory & McLeod, competed with Patrick Small of the North West Company (NWC). In 1787, William McGillivray was a clerk here. In 1782–85, there were three groups of independent traders but, by 1789, they were consolidated into the NWC. Around 1790, McGillivray managed the Churchill River Department of the NWC from here. Here, in 1799, David Thompson married a thirteen or fourteen-year-old Métis daughter of Patrick Small. Unlike most "country marriages" this lasted until his death.

William Linklater of the HBC built a post in 1799. Peter Skene Ogden and Samuel Black of the NWC harassed it. In spring 1811, Peter Fidler was forced to abandon it and the Nor'westers burnt it to the ground. In 1814, the HBC built a new post at a different location. In 1817 or 1818, the NWC built a fence around it. The HBC built a third time and called its post Fort Superior. The two companies were merged in 1821. By around 1980, there was still an HBC warehouse. Most of the posts were located near the town of Île-à-la-Crosse, but either the NWC or the XY Company seems to have had a place on the west side of the mouth of the Beaver River.

== Recreation ==
Ile a la Crosse War Veterans Park Campground, also known as Lac Île-à-la-Crosse (South Bay) Recreation Site (55.3559°N 107.8676°W), is a provincial recreation site situated on the western shore of Lac Île-à-la-Crosse's South Bay. The park has 22 free, un-serviced campsites, two sandy beaches, a floating dock, and a boat launch. Access is from Highway 155.

Farther north along South Bay's western Shore, and also accessed from Highway 155, is Pemmican Lodge. It has lake access, three cabins, and a campground. Adjacent to the community of Île-à-la-Crosse is Northern Eagle Resort. It has a self-contained guest house, camping, and a boat launch. On the eastern shore of Lac Île-à-la-Crosse, is Bearadise Bay Wilderness Camp. It is an outfitters and a "wilderness adventure camp focusing on bear hunting, fishing and wilderness experience". Access is from Highway 918.

== Fish species ==
Fish commonly found in Lac Île-à-la-Crosse include burbot, cisco, lake trout, lake whitefish, longnose sucker, northern pike, walleye, white sucker, and yellow perch.

== See also ==
- North American fur trade
- List of lakes of Saskatchewan
