= List of airlines of Saskatchewan =

This is a list of airlines of Saskatchewan which have an Air Operator's Certificate issued by Transport Canada, the country's civil aviation authority. These are airlines that are based in Saskatchewan.

== Current airlines ==
Airline	Image	IATA	ICAO	Callsign	Hub airport(s) or headquarters	Notes
Pronto Airways			WEW	PRONTO	Prince Albert (Glass Field)	Scheduled passenger service. Part of West Wind Aviation.
Transwest Air		9T		ATHABASKA	Prince Albert (Glass Field)	Helicopters, scheduled passenger service, charters
West Wind Aviation			WEW	WESTWIND	Saskatoon John G. Diefenbaker	Scheduled passenger service, charters, MEDIVAC (air ambulance). Also owns Pronto Airways.

== Defunct airlines ==
Airline	Image	IATA	ICAO	Callsign	Hub airport(s) or headquarters	Notes
Cherry Red Airline					Prince Albert (Glass Field)	1928 - 1932
M&C Aviation					Prince Albert (Glass Field)	1930 - 1947, to Norcanair (Saskatchewan Government Airways)
Norcanair					Prince Albert (Glass Field)	1947 - 1987, early 1990s, 2001 - 2005, originally M&C Aviation then Time Air
North Canada Air					Prince Albert (Glass Field)	1930 - 1965, see also M&C Aviation, Time Air
Saskatchewan Government Airways					Prince Albert (Glass Field)	1947 - 1965, to Norcanair
