= Pronto Airways =

Canadian airline

Pronto Airways LP
| IATA | ICAO | Call sign |
|---|---|---|
| - | WEW | PRONTO |
- Founded: 2006
- Commenced operations: 01/02/2006
- Ceased operations: 2015
- Hubs: Prince Albert (Glass Field) Airport
- Focus cities: Saskatoon/John G. Diefenbaker International Airport
- Fleet size: 4
- Destinations: 8
- Parent company: West Wind Aviation
- Headquarters: Saskatoon, Saskatchewan
- Key people: Dennis Goll (President)
- Website: ProntoAirways.com

Pronto Airways LP was an airline formed in 2006 that was based in Saskatoon, Saskatchewan, Canada. It operated scheduled and charter passenger services as well as cargo service until the airline ceased operations in 2015. Its main bases were Prince Albert and Saskatoon, with destinations throughout northern Saskatchewan and Nunavut.

== History ==
Pronto Airways began operating air services on February 1, 2006 serving Prince Albert, Points North Landing, Wollaston Lake, and La Ronge. On March 15, 2006, service was extended to Saskatoon and Stony Rapids.

In 2015, Pronto's cargo and passenger services were absorbed into those of its parent company, West Wind Aviation, effectively discontinuing the Pronto name. Pronto Airways' fleet consisted of one Beechcraft King Air and three Beechcraft 1900Cs. The King Air and two of the 1990Cs were repainted and continue to fly under the West Wind banner.

== Destinations ==
Destinations as of June 30, 2009

- Nunavut
  - Baker Lake (Baker Lake Airport)
  - Rankin Inlet (Rankin Inlet Airport)
- Saskatchewan
  - Fond-du-Lac, Saskatchewan (Fond-du-Lac Airport)
  - Points North (Points North Landing Airport)
  - Prince Albert (Prince Albert (Glass Field) Airport)
  - Saskatoon (Saskatoon John G. Diefenbaker International Airport)
  - Stony Rapids (Stony Rapids Airport)
  - Uranium City (Uranium City Airport)
  - Wollaston Lake (Wollaston Lake Airport)
  - Regina (Regina International Airport)

== See also ==
- List of defunct airlines of Canada
