= Saskatchewan Highway 995 =

Provincial highway in Saskatchewan, Canada

Highway 995

Route information
- Maintained by Ministry of Highways and Infrastructure
- Length: 102 km (63 mi)

Major junctions
- South end: Wollaston Lake
- North end: Hatchet Lake

Location
- Country: Canada
- Province: Saskatchewan

Highway system
- Provincial highways in Saskatchewan
← Highway 994	→ Highway 999

Highway 995, also known as Welcome Street, is a provincial highway in Northern Saskatchewan, Canada. Originally, it was one of the few highways in Saskatchewan that was completely isolated (by land) from the other highways. Seasonal access was provided to Highway 905 by way of the Wollaston Lake Barge.

The original course of Highway 995 runs along Welcome Bay on the south-eastern shore of Wollaston Lake. It ran from Wollaston Lake Airport south then east around the bay north to the Wollaston Lake Barge. The entire highway was unpaved and was about 5 kilometres (3.1 mi) long.

In 2027, the new course of the 102-kilometre (63 mi) all-weather gravel Highway 995 connecting to Highway 905 will open. The highway services the communities of Wollaston Lake and Hatchet Lake Denesuline First Nation.

== See also ==
- Roads in Saskatchewan
- Transportation in Saskatchewan
