= ZFD =

ZFD could refer to:

- Farringdon station, London, England; National Rail station code ZFD
- Fond-du-Lac Airport, Saskatchewan, Canada; IATA airport code ZFD
- ZfD or ZFD: ZENworks for Desktops (in a Novell computer-networking environment)
- Zermelo–Fraenkel set theory with the axiom of determinacy
