= YBE =

YBE may refer to:

- YBE, a "Young Black Entrepreneur"
- "Y.B.E.", a song on the 2000 hip-hop album H.N.I.C. by Prodigy of Mobb Deep
- ybe, the ISO code for the Western Yugur language in China
- YBE, the "Year's Basic Exemption" in the Canada Pension Plan
- The ICAO code for Stewart Aviation Services, United States
- YBE, "Yang–Baxter equation"

In places:

- YBE, the IATA airport code for Uranium City Airport in Canada
