= YLJ =

YLJ may refer to:

- The Yale Law Journal, a student-run law review affiliated with Yale Law School
- Meadow Lake Airport (Saskatchewan), IATA airport code YLJ
