= Flight 282 =

Flight 282 may refer to:

Listed chronologically

- Flying Tiger Line Flight 282, crashed on 24 December 1964
- West Wind Aviation Flight 282, crashed on 13 December 2017
