= Saskatchewan Highway 999 =

Provincial highway in Saskatchewan, Canada

Highway 999

Route information
- Maintained by Ministry of Highways and Infrastructure
- Length: 14.3 km (8.9 mi)

Location
- Country: Canada
- Province: Saskatchewan

Highway system
- Provincial highways in Saskatchewan
← Highway 995	→ Highway 1

Highway 999 is a provincial highway in the far north region of the Canadian province of Saskatchewan. It is split in two sections and serves the small settlement of Camsell Portage and Charlot River Airport on the north side of Lake Athabasca. The western section of the highway is about 2 kilometres (1.2 mi) long and serves Camsell Portage, which is the northern-most settlement in Saskatchewan, and Camsell Portage Airport. The eastern section is about 12.3 kilometres (7.6 mi) long and runs from Charlot River Airport on the shore of Lake Athabasca east to Dam Lake. The highway provides access to the three Athabasca System Hydroelectric Stations.

Highway 999 is one of the few highways in Saskatchewan that is completely isolated (by land) from the other highways of the province, without even a regular seasonal / winter road link, and thus is only used for local traffic. The two sections combine give the highway a total length of about 14.3 kilometres (8.9 mi).

== See also ==
- Roads in Saskatchewan
- Transportation in Saskatchewan
- List of highways numbered 999
