= Wollaston Lake Airport =

Airport in Saskatchewan, Canada

- IATA: ZWL; ICAO: CZWL

Summary
- Airport type: Public
- Operator: Ministry of Highways & Infrastructure
- Location: Wollaston Lake
- Time zone: CST (UTC−06:00)
- Elevation AMSL: 1,358 ft / 414 m
- Coordinates: 58°06′25″N 103°10′21″W

Map
- Location in Saskatchewan CZWL (Canada)

Runways
Direction	Length		Surface
Direction	ft	m	Surface
17/35	3,793	1,156	Paved - TBS
- Sources: Canada Flight Supplement

Wollaston Lake Airport (IATA: ZWL, ICAO: CZWL) is located adjacent to Wollaston Lake in Saskatchewan, Canada on the Hatchet Lake Dene Nation.

The airport consists of one runway (17/35) and a single apron.

Transwest Air maintained a terminal, a fuel tank and a hangar at the airport. Pronto Airways maintains a terminal.

== Airlines and destinations ==
Charter air service was provided by Transwest Air's (Piper PA-31 Navajo based in Wollaston Lake), West Wind Aviation, Osprey Wings and Courtesy Air.

=== Passenger ===
Airlines	Destinations
Rise Air	La Ronge, Points North, Prince Albert, Saskatoon

== See also ==
- List of airports in Saskatchewan
