= Wollaston Lake =

Lake in Saskatchewan, Canada

- ᒌᑲᐦᐃᑲᐣ ᓵᑲᐦᐃᑲᓂᕽ; cîkahikan sâkahikanihk (Woods Cree)
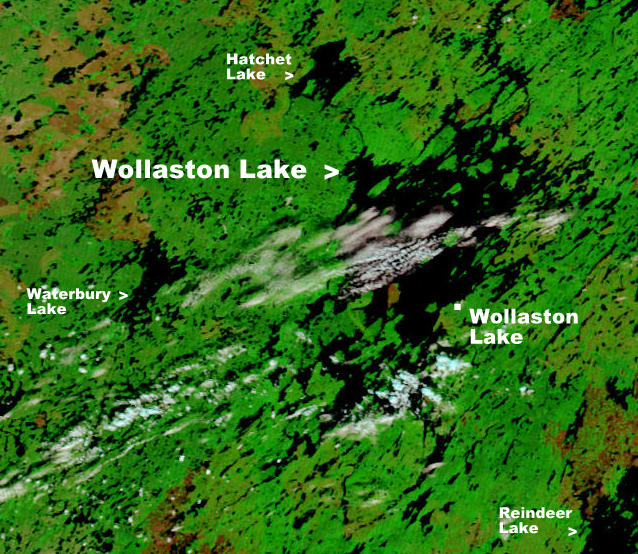
- NASA image of Wollaston Lake

- Location of Wollaston Lake in Saskatchewan Wollaston Lake (Canada)
- Location: Northern Administration District, Saskatchewan
- Coordinates: 58°15′N 103°20′W
- Type: Glacial lake
- Primary inflows: Geikie River
- Primary outflows: Fond du Lac River (10%); Cochrane River (90%)
- Catchment area: 20,000 km^{2} (7,700 sq mi)
- Basin countries: Canada
- Surface area: 2,681 km^{2} (1,035 sq mi)
- Average depth: 20.6 m (68 ft)
- Max. depth: 97 m (318 ft)
- Water volume: 39.8 km^{3} (32,300,000 acre⋅ft)
- Shore length^{1}: 1,475 km (917 mi)
- Surface elevation: 398 m (1,306 ft)
- Islands: Horton Island
- Settlements: Wollaston Lake
- ^{1} Shore length is not a well-defined measure.

Wollaston Lake (Woods Cree: ᒌᑲᐦᐃᑲᐣ ᓵᑲᐦᐃᑲᓂᕽ, romanized: cîkahikan sâkahikanihk, lit. 'at hatchet/axe lake') is a lake in the north-eastern part of the Canadian province of Saskatchewan. It is the largest natural bifurcation lake in the world—that is, a lake that drains naturally in two directions, with a surface area of 2,286 square kilometres (883 sq mi) (excluding islands; 2,681 square kilometres (1,035 sq mi) if islands are included),

It is about 550 kilometres (340 mi) north-east of Prince Albert. Wollaston Lake is the largest lake entirely within Saskatchewan, although the Saskatchewanian portions of Lake Athabasca and Reindeer Lake are both larger.

== Hydrology ==
About 10% of the lake's water drains into the Fond du Lac River, which flows out of the lake to the north-west, where it drains into Lake Athabasca, which ultimately drains into the Arctic Ocean via the Mackenzie River system. The rest of the water drains into the Cochrane River, which flows out of the north-eastern side of the lake and into Reindeer Lake, which drains via the Churchill River system into Hudson Bay.

Wollaston Lake's main inflow is the Geikie River which flows from the south-west into the south-west section of the lake. If Hudson Bay is considered an arm of the Atlantic Ocean, then the Geikie is the largest river in the world to flow naturally into two oceans.

The Arctic Divide is interrupted at the watershed of Wollaston Lake. The Canadian National Hydro Network map assigns a work unit boundary going through the lake that is sometimes confused for a watershed divide despite the fact that water freely exchanges through all areas of the lake and that work units do not necessarily reflect watershed boundaries.

== Ecology ==
Fish species found in Wollaston Lake include walleye, yellow perch, northern pike, lake trout, Arctic grayling, lake whitefish, cisco, burbot, white sucker, round whitefish, and longnose sucker. The largest lake trout caught in Saskatchewan was in Wollaston Lake in 1995. It weighed 24.6 kilograms (54 lb).

Treated effluent from the Rabbit Lake uranium mine is released into Hidden Bay on the south-western side of the lake.

== History ==
Samuel Hearne learned of the lake and its dual drainage from Chipewyan Indigenous guides in 1770 as part of his third expedition, in which he became the first European Canadian to reach the Arctic Ocean over land from the continent's east coast.

The canoe route traversing the Arctic Divide through Reindeer Lake, Wollaston Lake, and Lake Athabasca had the disadvantage of difficult portages and being frozen much of the year, despite its shorter overall length. The Hudson's Bay Company dispatched David Thompson in 1796 to explore the vicinity of Wollaston Lake for easier portages, but did not find them. The route thus did not become widely used by fur brigades, which preferred the Methye Portage instead. Nevertheless, Thompson reported the dual outlets as "perhaps without parallel in the world."

The Indigenous name for the lake was reported by Thompson to be Manito, meaning "supernatural". In 1807, Peter Fidler named the lake after George Hyde Wollaston, a member of the Hudson Bay Company's Committee and brother of William Hyde Wollaston.

Missionary Oblate Émile Petitot, who spent 1862–1879 methodically mapping the area between the Mackenzie River and Coppermine River, denied that Wollaston Lake was a bifurcation lake, writing "there is absolutely no communication between the lakes occupying the two slopes of the water-parting." His maps also showed Wollaston Lake draining into Reindeer Lake via a short, direct river he called the Canoe River, rather than via the Cochrane River which flows in a long meandering arc to the north. It is unknown whether these statements reflect historical hydrological changes or were in error.

== Settlement ==
The only settlement on its shores is also named Wollaston Lake. The settlement includes the northern hamlet of Wollaston Lake with a population of 129 and the adjacent village of Wollaston Post of the Hatchet Lake Dene Nation with a population of 1,251.

Wollaston Recreation Site (58.1006°N 103.7904°W), also known as Hidden Bay Campground, is a provincially run park located on the north bank of Umpherville River near its mouth where it empties into Hidden Bay of Wollaston Lake. The campground featured 12 campsites, a boat launch, fish cleaning station, and a picnic area. Wildfires completely burned the campground and as of October 2026 it remains closed until further notice. The park is located on kilometre 240 of Highway 905, 260 kilometres (160 mi) north of the community of Southend.

== Transportation ==
The all-weather Highway 905 connects the west side of Wollaston Lake to La Ronge. The community of Wollaston Lake is located on the eastern side, but the lake can be crossed by a winter road when the lake is frozen (November through June) and by the Wollaston barge ferry when it is not.

As of 2026, Rise Air provides scheduled service to Wollaston Lake Airport, connecting it to Points North Landing (a service centre for nearby uranium mines), La Ronge, Prince Albert, and Saskatoon.

On the west side of the lake at Collins Bay, near Collins Creek, is Collins Bay Airport. Also on the west side of the lake, near Hidden Bay, is an abandoned airport called Hidden Bay Airport.

At the southern end of the lake at Nekweaga Bay is Nekweaga Bay Airport, a private airport that provides access to Wilderness Family Outfitters.

== See also ==
- Isa Lake
- List of lakes of Saskatchewan
