= La Ronge (Barber Field) Airport =

Airport in Saskatchewan, Canada

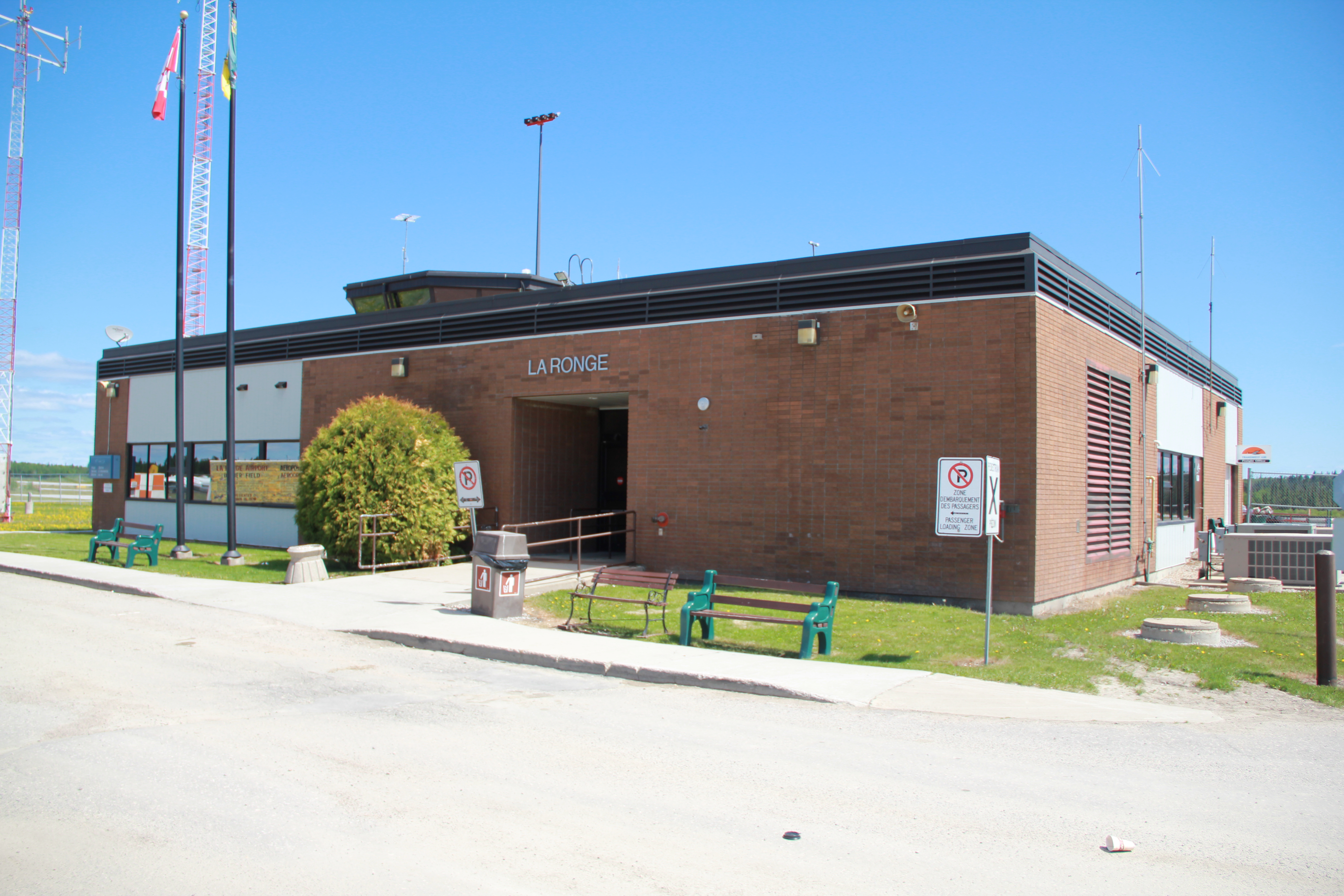
- IATA: YVC; ICAO: CYVC; WMO: 71922

Summary
- Airport type: Public
- Operator: Town of La Ronge
- Location: La Ronge, Saskatchewan
- Time zone: CST (UTC−06:00)
- Elevation AMSL: 1,244 ft / 379 m
- Coordinates: 55°09′05″N 105°16′01″W

Map
- Location in Saskatchewan CYVC (Canada)

Runways
| Direction | Length | | Surface |
| Direction | ft | m | Surface |
|---|---|---|---|
| 11/29 | 2,396 | 730 | Treated gravel |
| 18/36 | 5,002 | 1,525 | Asphalt |

Statistics (2010)
- Aircraft movements: 18,230
- Sources: Canada Flight Supplement; Environment Canada; Movements from Statistics Canada

La Ronge (Barber Field) Airport (IATA: YVC, ICAO: CYVC) is located 2 nautical miles (3.7 km; 2.3 mi) north-east of La Ronge, Saskatchewan, Canada.

== Airlines and destinations ==
=== Passenger ===
| Airlines | Destinations |
|---|---|
| Rise Air | Points North, Prince Albert, Saskatoon, Wollaston |

== See also ==
- List of airports in Saskatchewan
- La Ronge Water Aerodrome
- La Ronge Heliport
