= Wollaston Lake Barge Ferry =

Ferry in Saskatchewan, Canada

Coordinates: 58.061245°N 103.794307°W

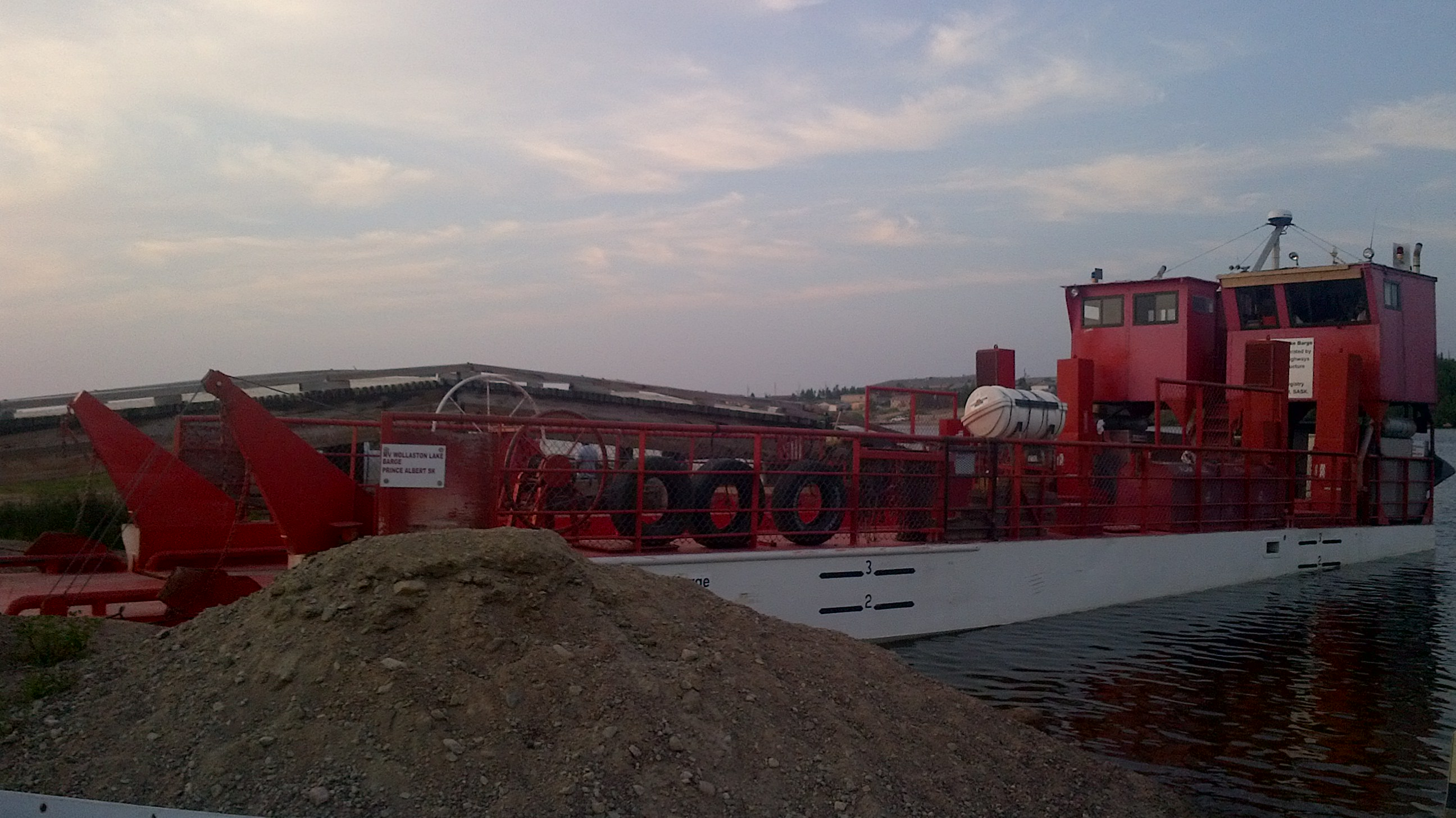
- Wollaston Lake Barge docked at Wollaston
- Locale: Wollaston Lake, Saskatchewan, Canada
- Waterway: Wollaston Lake
- Transit type: Passenger and vehicle ferry
- Operator: Hatchet Lake Dene Nation
- System length: 46 km (29 mi)
- No. of lines: 1
- No. of vessels: 1
- No. of terminals: 2

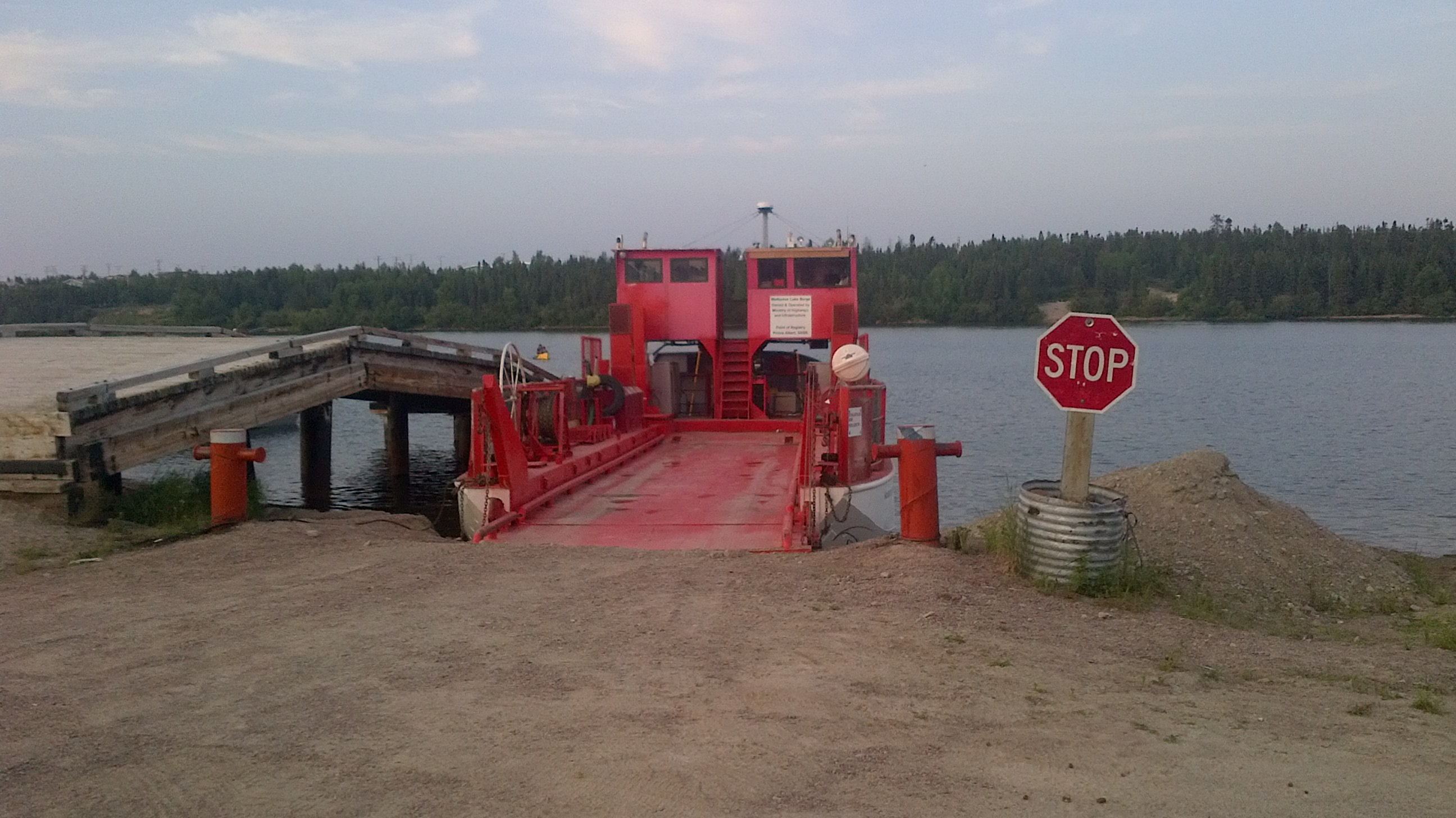
Front view docked at Barge Landing in Wollaston Lake, SK.

The Wollaston Lake Barge Ferry is a barge ferry that operates in the Canadian province of Saskatchewan in the Northern Saskatchewan Administration District of the province. The ferry crosses Wollaston Lake, providing a link between Highways 905 and 995 and the community of Wollaston Lake, Saskatchewan.

The barge is operated by the Hatchet Lake Dene Nation under contract to the Government of Saskatchewan. The barge has tolls and operates twice per day during the ice-free season while an ice-road is used during part of the winter. Passage must be pre-booked.

The ferry has a length of 15.2 metres (50 ft), a width of 2.7 metres (8 ft 10 in), and a load limit of 19 tonnes (19 long tons; 21 short tons). It is the only non-cable ferry in the province.

== See also ==
- Transportation in Saskatchewan
