= Buttress, Saskatchewan =

Defunct aerodrome in Saskatchewan, Canada

Location in Saskatchewan

Buttress was built in 1940 as the relief landing field for RCAF Station Moose Jaw and Royal Air Force's, No. 32 Service Flying Training School that was stationed there. These fields were used for practice circuits and also as an emergency alternate landing field.

The Buttress Post Office opened on July 1, 1909 and closed on July 31, 1961.

== Aerodrome ==
In approximately 1942, the aerodrome was listed as RCAF Aerodrome - Buttress, Saskatchewan at 50°15′N 105°33′W with a variation of 18 degrees east and elevation of 2,000 ft (610 m). The relief field was constructed in the typical triangular pattern and had three runways, listed as follows:

Runway name	Length	Width	Surface
6/24	2,700 ft (820 m)	100 ft (30 m)	Hard surfaced
12/30	2,700 ft (820 m)	100 ft (30 m)	Hard surfaced
18/36	3,000 ft (910 m)	100 ft (30 m)	Hard surfaced

Today the aerodrome is abandoned but the telltale British Commonwealth Air Training Plan triangle of runways is still visible from the air. A review of Google Maps in June 2018 shows a clear outline of the former triangular airfield and the coordinates stated above appear to be correct. It is located on private land, 9.7 kilometres (6 mi) south of CFB Moose Jaw, on the west side of Highway 2.

== See also ==
- List of airports in Saskatchewan
- List of defunct airports in Canada
