= List of airports in Saskatchewan =

This is a list of airports in Saskatchewan. It includes all Nav Canada certified and registered water and land airports, aerodromes and heliports in the Canadian province of Saskatchewan. Airport names in italics are part of the National Airports System.

Saskatchewan

== List of airports and heliports ==
The list is sorted by the name of the community served; click the sort buttons in the table header to switch listing order.

Community	Airport name	PU PR MI	AOE (Note: An airport of entry has four different categories. An AOE which can accept "all classes of scheduled and non-scheduled aircraft (passenger and cargo)." An AOE/# which can handle aircraft in the previous category but up to maximum number. This number can be exceeded if done in stages as shown in parentheses. An AOE/15 that can accept general aviation aircraft with a maximum of 15 passengers. An AOE/CAN which can handle aircraft subject to the CANPASS regulations.)	Operator	Elevation	ICAO	TC LID	IATA	Image	Coordinates
Alida	Alida/Cowan Farm Private Aerodrome	PR		Gary Cowan	1,866 ft (569 m)		CCF7			49°23′47″N 101°49′30″W
Allan	Allan Aerodrome	PR		Charlie Smith	1,950 ft (590 m)		CAN5			51°45′55″N 106°04′05″W
Arborfield	Arborfield Airport	PU		R. Cummings	1,183 ft (361 m)		CJM6			53°06′28″N 103°39′02″W
Arcola	Arcola Airport	PU		Town of Arcola	1,985 ft (605 m)		CJA7			49°38′00″N 102°29′00″W
Assiniboia	Assiniboia Airport (RCAF Station Assiniboia)	PU		Town of Assiniboia	2,370 ft (720 m)		CJN4			49°44′05″N 105°56′49″W
Beauval	Beauval Airport	PU		Ministry of Highways and Infrastructure	1,430 ft (440 m)		CJK3			55°06′37″N 107°42′59″W
Big River	Big River Airport	PU		Town of Big River	1,592 ft (485 m)		CKX8			53°50′10″N 107°00′34″W
Biggar	Biggar Airport	PU		Town of Biggar	2,130 ft (650 m)		CJF8			52°03′04″N 107°59′18″W
Birch Hills	Birch Hills Airport	PU		Town of Birch Hills	1,500 ft (460 m)		CJD3			52°59′27″N 105°26′41″W
Briercrest	Briercrest South Airport	PU		Randy Thiele	2,120 ft (650 m)		CBS7			50°03′59″N 105°18′02″W
Buffalo Narrows	Buffalo Narrows Airport	PU		Ministry of Highways and Infrastructure	1,423 ft (434 m)	CYVT		YVT		55°50′31″N 108°25′04″W
Buffalo Narrows	Buffalo Narrows (Fire Centre) Heliport	PR		Saskatchewan Ministry of Environment Fire Management & Forest Protection	1,411 ft (430 m)		CBN3			55°50′03″N 108°24′15″W
Buffalo Narrows	Buffalo Narrows Water Aerodrome	PU		Voyage Air	1,382 ft (421 m)		CJB7			55°50′39″N 108°26′11″W
Cabri	Cabri Airport	PU		Town of Cabri	2,185 ft (666 m)		CJJ5			50°37′10″N 108°27′58″W
Black Lake	Black Lake Water Aerodrome	PU		Camp Grayling	909 ft (277 m)		CJZ6			59°09′00″N 105°33′00″W
Camsell Portage	Camsell Portage Airport	PU		Ministry of Highways and Infrastructure	750 ft (230 m)		CJP6			59°36′36″N 109°16′01″W
Candle Lake	Candle Lake Airpark	PU		Candle Lake Flying Club	1,650 ft (500 m)		CCL2			53°46′06″N 105°18′28″W
Carlyle	Carlyle Airport	PU		Town of Carlyle	2,075 ft (632 m)		CJQ3			49°38′39″N 102°17′12″W
Central Butte	Central Butte Airport	PU		Town of Central Butte	2,030 ft (620 m)		CJC4			50°48′05″N 106°29′18″W
Charlot River Power Station	Charlot River Airport	PU		Saskatchewan Power Corp.	3,363 ft (1,025 m)		CJP9			59°36′05″N 109°08′18″W
Cigar Lake mine	Cigar Lake Airport	PR		Cameco Corporation	1,554 ft (474 m)		CJW7			58°03′11″N 104°29′04″W
Collins Bay	Collins Bay Airport	PR		Cameco Corporation	1,340 ft (410 m)	CYKC				58°14′10″N 103°40′40″W
Coronach / Scobey, Montana	Coronach/Scobey Border Station Airport	PU	15	Montana Aeronautics Division	2,501 ft (762 m)		CKK3			49°00′00″N 105°23′56″W
Craik	Craik Airport	PU		L. Carlson	1,950 ft (590 m)		CJC2			51°03′22″N 105°50′18″W
Cree Lake	Cree Lake/Crystal Lodge (Midgett Field) Aerodrome	PR		Crystal Lodge	1,615 ft (492 m)		CKS8			57°27′51″N 106°44′54″W
Cree Lake	Cree Lake (Crystal Lodge) Water Aerodrome	PU		Ron Olsen	1,595 ft (486 m)		CRE4			57°27′43″N 106°44′46″W
Cudworth	Cudworth Municipal Airport	PU		Town of Cudworth	1,878 ft (572 m)		CJD2			52°29′00″N 105°43′02″W
Cumberland House	Cumberland House Airport	PU		Ministry of Highways and Infrastructure	878 ft (268 m)		CJT4			53°57′22″N 102°17′54″W
Cupar	Loon Creek Airfield	PR		Kevin Machniak	1,870 ft (570 m)		CLC4			50°50′44″N 104°19′25″W
Davidson	Davidson Municipal Airport	PU		Town of Davidson	3,400 ft (1,000 m)		CJC3			51°14′52″N 105°58′35″W
Debden	Debden Airport	PU		Town of Debden	1,700 ft (520 m)		CKH3			53°31′55″N 106°53′02″W
Dinsmore	Dinsmore Aerodrome	PU		Town of Dinsmore	1,900 ft (580 m)		CKX5			51°19′50″N 107°26′15″W
Eatonia	Eatonia (Elvie Smith) Municipal Airport	PU		Town of Eatonia	2,365 ft (721 m)		CJG2			51°13′08″N 109°23′33″W
Edam	Edam Airport	PU		RM of Turtle River	1,790 ft (550 m)		CJU7			53°11′06″N 108°47′21″W
Elstow	Elstow/Combine World Field Aerodrome	PR		Charlie Smith	1,725 ft (526 m)		CEW2			52°00′01″N 106°06′58″W
Esterhazy	Esterhazy Airport	PU		Town of Esterhazy	1,700 ft (520 m)		CJK4			50°38′34″N 102°06′01″W
Estevan	Estevan Regional Aerodrome	PU	CANPASS	City of Estevan	1,904 ft (580 m)	CYEN		YEN		49°12′37″N 102°57′57″W
Estevan	Estevan (Blue Sky) Aerodrome	PR		Blue Sky Air	1,955 ft (596 m)		CBS2			49°17′38″N 103°01′11″W
Estevan	Estevan (St. Josephs's Hospital) Heliport	PR		Sun County Health Region	1,878 ft (572 m)		CSJ3			49°09′11″N 103°00′47″W
Eston	Eston Airport	PU		RM of Snipe Lake	2,225 ft (678 m)		CJR4			51°08′39″N 108°45′46″W
Fillmore	Fillmore Airport	PU		R. Boll	2,000 ft (610 m)		CKN5			49°52′08″N 103°26′43″W
Fond du Lac Denesuline First Nation	Fond-du-Lac Airport	PU		Ministry of Highways	796 ft (243 m)	CZFD		ZFD		59°20′04″N 107°10′55″W
Fort Qu'Appelle	Fort Qu'Appelle (All Nations Healing Hospital) Heliport	PR		Treaty Four Holding Corp All Nations Healing Hospital	1,581 ft (482 m)		CFQ2			50°45′38″N 103°47′08″W
Frontier	Frontier Airport	PU		RM of Frontier No. 19	2,960 ft (900 m)		CJM5			49°10′22″N 108°34′29″W
Glaslyn	Glaslyn Airport	PU		Village of Glaslyn	2,250 ft (690 m)		CJE5			53°22′38″N 108°20′32″W
Goodsoil	Goodsoil Airport	PU		Village of Goodsoil	1,750 ft (530 m)		CKF4			54°25′00″N 109°14′00″W
Gravelbourg	Gravelbourg Airport	PU		Town of Gravelbourg	2,296 ft (700 m)		CJM4			49°52′00″N 106°34′00″W
Grenfell	Grenfell Airport	PU		Town of Grenfell	1,964 ft (599 m)		CKU6			50°25′09″N 102°56′07″W
Gull Lake	Gull Lake Airport	PU		RM of Gull Lake No. 139	2,665 ft (812 m)		CJK5			50°03′28″N 108°29′24″W
Hafford	Hafford Airport	PU		Raptor Enterprises	1,935 ft (590 m)		CJC6			52°43′56″N 107°22′27″W
Hatchet Lake	Hatchet Lake Airport	PU		Hatchet Lake Lodge	1,370 ft (420 m)		CJL2			58°39′45″N 103°32′18″W
Hatchet Lake	Hatchet Lake Water Aerodrome	PR		Hatchet Lake Lodge	1,286 ft (392 m)		CJX8			58°38′00″N 103°35′00″W
Hatchet Lake Denesuline First Nation	Wollaston Lake Airport	PU		Ministry of Highways and Infrastructure	1,358 ft (414 m)	CZWL		ZWL		58°06′25″N 103°10′20″W
Hudson Bay	Hudson Bay Airport	PU		Ministry of Highways and Infrastructure	1,178 ft (359 m)	CYHB		YHB		52°49′00″N 102°18′41″W
Humboldt	Humboldt Airport	PU		City of Humboldt	1,859 ft (567 m)		CJU4			52°10′34″N 105°07′36″W
Île-à-la-Crosse	Île-à-la-Crosse Airport	PU		Ministry of Highways and Infrastructure	1,394 ft (425 m)		CJF3			55°29′23″N 107°55′48″W
Ituna	Ituna Airport	PU		Town of Ituna	2,200 ft (670 m)		CJM2			51°08′46″N 103°25′34″W
Jan Lake	Jan Lake Airport	PU		Jan Lake Community Association Inc.	1,135 ft (346 m)		CKM4			54°49′51″N 102°47′19″W
Kamsack	Kamsack Airport	PU		Town of Kamsack	1,510 ft (460 m)		CJN2			51°33′35″N 101°52′44″W
Kelvington	Kelvington Airport	PU		Town of Kelvington	1,860 ft (570 m)		CKV2			52°08′00″N 103°32′05″W
Kelvington	Kelvington/Clayton Air 2 Aerodrome	PR		Clayton Air Service	1,932 ft (589 m)		CKA2			52°12′07″N 103°28′43″W
Kerrobert	Kerrobert Airport	PU		Town of Kerrobert	2,208 ft (673 m)		CJP2			51°55′37″N 109°07′46″W
Kerrobert	Kerrobert Heliport	PR		Town of Kerrobert	2,275 ft (693 m)		CKR2			51°54′46″N 109°08′00″W
Key Lake	Key Lake Airport	PU		Cameco Corporation	1,686 ft (514 m)	CYKJ		YKJ		57°15′23″N 105°37′03″W
Kindersley	Kindersley Regional Airport	PU		Airport Authority	2,276 ft (694 m)	CYKY		YKY		51°30′55″N 109°10′50″W
Kipling	Kipling Airport	PU		Town of Kipling	2,154 ft (657 m)		CKD5			50°05′57″N 102°36′25″W
Kisbey	Kisbey/Brigden Field Aerodrome	PU		Brigden Ag Air	2,017 ft (615 m)		CBR3			49°37′01″N 102°46′05″W
Kyle	Kyle Airport	PU		Rick Heard	2,175 ft (663 m)		CJB8			50°50′00″N 108°04′12″W
La Loche	La Loche Airport	PU		Ministry of Highways and Infrastructure	1,513 ft (461 m)		CJL4			56°28′24″N 109°24′13″W
La Ronge	La Ronge (Barber Field) Airport	PU		Town of La Ronge	1,244 ft (379 m)	CYVC		YVC		55°09′05″N 105°15′43″W
La Ronge	La Ronge Heliport	PR		Saskatchewan Ministry of Environment. Wildfire Management	1,225 ft (373 m)		CJX3			55°06′53″N 105°17′43″W
La Ronge	La Ronge Water Aerodrome	PU		Transwest Air	1,193 ft (364 m)		CJZ9			55°06′00″N 105°17′00″W
Lampman	Lampman Airport	PU		Lampman Pilots Club	1,950 ft (590 m)		CJQ2			49°22′19″N 102°45′48″W
Lampman	Lampman/Spitfire Air Aerodrome	PR		Rick Vinck	1,975 ft (602 m)		CSF8			49°29′24″N 102°52′58″W
Lanigan	Lanigan Airport	PU		Town of Lanigan	1,750 ft (530 m)		CKC6			51°50′43″N 104°59′32″W
Leader	Leader Airport	PU		Town of Leader	2,201 ft (671 m)		CJD5			50°52′38″N 109°30′02″W
Leask	Leask Airport	PU		Village of Leask	1,715 ft (523 m)		CJH8			53°01′00″N 106°45′00″W
Lemberg	Lemberg Airport	PU		Lemberg Flying Club	2,050 ft (620 m)		CKJ9			50°42′32″N 103°11′48″W
Little Bear Lake	Little Bear Lake Airport	PU		Bruce Woods	2,100 ft (640 m)		CKL6			54°17′31″N 104°40′17″W
Lloydminster (Note: The main airport serving the city, Lloydminster Airport, is located in Alberta)	Lloydminster/Fort Pitt Farms Aerodrome	PR		Fort Pitt Farms	1,798 ft (548 m)		CFP3			53°34′31″N 109°48′33″W
Lloydminster	Lloydminster (Hospital) Heliport	PR		Saskatchewan Health Authority	2,117 ft (645 m)		CLH6			53°16′26″N 109°59′21″W
Loon Lake	Loon Lake Airport	PU		G. Taylor	1,790 ft (550 m)		CJW3			54°01′06″N 109°08′07″W
Lucky Lake	Lucky Lake Airport	PU		Village of Lucky Lake	2,084 ft (635 m)		CKQ5			50°59′39″N 107°07′53″W
Lumsden	Disley Aerodrome	PR		Vic Zubot, Ron Wood	1,850 ft (560 m)		CDS2			50°38′09″N 105°02′09″W
Lumsden	Lumsden (Colhoun) Airport	PR		Lumsden Aero	1,900 ft (580 m)		CKH8			50°40′03″N 104°47′22″W
Luseland	Luseland Airport	PU		Town of Luseland	2,300 ft (700 m)		CJR2			52°04′10″N 109°22′30″W
Macklin	Eye Hill Municipal Airport (Macklin Aerodrome)	PU		Rural Municipality # 382	2,280 ft (690 m)		CJJ8			52°20′34″N 109°55′08″W
Maidstone	Maidstone Aerodrome	PU		RM of Eldon No. 471	1,994 ft (608 m)		CJH3			53°05′52″N 109°19′44″W
Maple Creek	Maple Creek Airport	PU		Town of Maple Creek	2,522 ft (769 m)		CJQ4			49°53′45″N 109°28′30″W
Marcelin	Marcelin/Clayton Air 1 Aerodrome	PR		Clayton Air Service	1,715 ft (523 m)		CMC4			52°55′48″N 106°38′24″W
Martensville	Saskatoon/Richter Field Aerodrome	PR		Frank Richter	1,700 ft (520 m)		CRF5			52°16′49″N 106°41′02″W
Maryfield	Maryfield Aerodrome	PR		Nacho's Flying Services	1,885 ft (575 m)		CJQ8			49°50′47″N 101°30′51″W
McArthur River uranium mine	McArthur River Airport	PR		Cameco Corporation	1,729 ft (527 m)		CKQ8			57°46′03″N 105°01′27″W
Meadow Lake	Meadow Lake Airport	PU		Ministry of Highways and Infrastructure	1,577 ft (481 m)	CYLJ		YLJ		54°07′31″N 108°31′22″W
Melfort	Melfort (Hospital) Heliport	PR		Melfort Hospital	1,514 ft (461 m)		CMH7			52°51′57″N 104°36′49″W
Melfort	Melfort (Miller Field) Aerodrome	PU		City of Melfort	1,492 ft (455 m)		CJZ3			52°51′52″N 104°42′03″W
Misaw Lake	Misaw Lake Aerodrome	PR		Misaw Lake Lodge	1,292 ft (394 m)		CAM2			59°45′14″N 102°25′22″W
Moose Jaw	CFB Moose Jaw	MI	AOE/M	DND	1,892 ft (577 m)	CYMJ		YMJ		50°19′49″N 105°33′33″W
Moose Jaw	Moose Jaw (Dr. F. H. Wigmore Regional Hospital) Heliport	PR		Dr. F. H. Wigmore Regional Hospital	1,879 ft (573 m)		CWH6			50°25′12″N 105°31′32″W
Moose Jaw	Moose Jaw Municipal Airport	PU		Provincial Airways or Moose Jaw Municipal Airport Authority Inc.	1,904 ft (580 m)		CJS4			50°26′01″N 105°23′10″W
Moosomin	Moosomin/Marshall McLeod Field Aerodrome	PU		Rural Municipality of Moosomin	1,838 ft (560 m)		CJB5			50°10′07″N 101°38′39″W
Neilburg	Neilburg Airport	PU		Village of Neilburg	2,222 ft (677 m)		CJV2			52°49′53″N 109°38′25″W
Nekweaga Bay	Nekweaga Bay Airport	PR		Wilderness Family Outfitters	1,320 ft (400 m)		CKN8			57°44′33″N 103°56′41″W
Nipawin	Nipawin Airport	PU		Town of Nipawin	1,220 ft (370 m)	CYBU		YBU		53°19′58″N 104°00′32″W
Nipawin	Nipawin Hospital Heliport	PR		Saskatchewan Health Authority	1,221 ft (372 m)		CNH3			53°21′17″N 104°00′12″W
North Battleford	North Battleford Airport	PU		City of North Battleford	1,799 ft (548 m)	CYQW		YQW		52°46′09″N 108°14′37″W
Odessa	Odessa/Strawberry Lakes Aerodrome	PU		Regina Gliding and Soaring Club	2,160 ft (660 m)		CSL7			50°21′49″N 103°44′30″W
Otter Lake	Otter Lake Water Aerodrome	PU		Osprey Wings	1,143 ft (348 m)		CKB4			55°36′00″N 104°46′00″W
Outlook	Outlook (South) Aerodrome	PR		Zimmer Air Services	1,767 ft (539 m)		CCL9			51°26′19″N 107°00′04″W
Oxbow	Oxbow Airport	PU		Oxbow Airport Authority	1,850 ft (560 m)		CJW2			49°13′26″N 102°08′46″W
Pangman	Pangman Airport	PU		RM of Norton No. 69	2,300 ft (700 m)		CKC9			49°38′49″N 104°39′55″W
Patuanak	Patuanak Airport	PU		Ministry of Highways and Infrastructure	1,431 ft (436 m)		CKB2			55°54′00″N 107°43′14″W
Pelican Narrows	Pelican Narrows Airport	PU		Ministry of Highways and Infrastructure	1,269 ft (387 m)		CJW4			55°17′15″N 102°44′58″W
Pelican Narrows	Pelican Narrows Water Aerodrome	PU		Pelican Narrows Air Services	1,030 ft (310 m)		CKE4			55°10′00″N 102°56′00″W
Pierceland	Pierceland (Turchyn Field) Aerodrome	PU		Nathan Turchyn	1,800 ft (550 m)		CTF5			54°18′01″N 109°55′38″W
Pilot Butte	Pilot Butte Airport	PU		Loren McDougall	2,000 ft (610 m)		CPB5			50°27′40″N 104°25′50″W
Pinehouse	Pinehouse Lake Airport	PU		Ministry of Highways and Infrastructure	1,285 ft (392 m)	CZPO				55°31′41″N 106°34′56″W
Points North Landing	Points North Landing Airport	PU		Points North Freight Forwarding Inc.	1,600 ft (490 m)	CYNL		YNL		58°16′36″N 104°04′57″W
Points North Landing	Points North Landing Water Aerodrome	PU		Points North Freight Forwarding Inc.	1,550 ft (470 m)		CKC2			58°16′04″N 104°04′49″W
Porcupine Plain	Porcupine Plain Airport	PU		Municipality of Porcupine Plain	1,635 ft (498 m)		CKD2			52°37′11″N 103°14′52″W
Poverty Valley	Poverty Valley Aerodrome	PU		N. Amthor	2,440 ft (740 m)		CPV9			50°02′20″N 107°15′22″W
Preeceville	Preeceville Airport	PU		Town of Preeceville	1,750 ft (530 m)		CJK9			51°57′00″N 102°39′00″W
Prince Albert	Prince Albert (Fire Centre) Heliport	PR		Saskatchewan Ministry of Environment Wildfire Management	1,476 ft (450 m)		CAL6			53°13′43″N 105°45′21″W
Prince Albert	Prince Albert (Glass Field) Airport	PU		City of Prince Albert	1,405 ft (428 m)	CYPA		YPA		53°12′51″N 105°40′22″W
Prince Albert	Prince Albert (Victoria Hospital) Heliport	PR		Victoria Hospital	1,515 ft (462 m)		CPV3			53°11′26″N 105°47′01″W
Quill Lake	Quill Lake Airport	PU		Town of Quill Lake	1,750 ft (530 m)		CKE2			52°04′00″N 104°16′00″W
Radville	Radville Airport	PU		Town of Radville	2,067 ft (630 m)		CKF2			49°27′38″N 104°16′18″W
Regina	Regina/Aerogate Aerodrome	PR		Mike Reibling	1,980 ft (600 m)		CAG2			50°35′52″N 104°36′04″W
Regina	Regina General Hospital Heliport	PR		Saskatchewan Health Authority	1,981 ft (604 m)		CRQ2			50°26′38″N 104°36′05″W
Regina	Regina International Airport	PU	200 (300)	Regina Airport Authority	1,895 ft (578 m)	CYQR		YQR		50°25′55″N 104°39′57″W
Regina Beach	Regina Beach Airport	PR		D. Edwards, Vortex Aviation	1,850 ft (560 m)		CKL9			50°45′26″N 104°58′58″W
Reindeer Lake	Malcolm Island Airport	PR		Arctic Lodge	1,120 ft (340 m)		CJS2			56°56′58″N 102°14′21″W
Reindeer Lake	Reindeer Lake Aerodrome	PR		Reindeer Lake Lodge	1,128 ft (344 m)		CRL7			57°17′17″N 102°31′30″W
Rockglen	Rockglen Airport	PU		Rockglen Council	2,700 ft (820 m)		CKC7			49°10′00″N 105°56′00″W
Rosetown	Rosetown Airport	PU		Provincial Airways	1,935 ft (590 m)		CJX4			51°33′52″N 107°55′00″W
St. Brieux	St. Brieux Airport	PU		Bourgault Industries Ltd.	1,780 ft (540 m)		CKK2			52°39′00″N 104°52′00″W
Sandy Bay	Sandy Bay Airport	PU		Ministry of Highways and Infrastructure	1,003 ft (306 m)		CJY4			55°32′43″N 102°16′21″W
Sandy Bay	Sandy Bay Water Aerodrome	PU		Ross Air Services	933 ft (284 m)		CKB5			55°31′32″N 102°19′20″W
Saskatoon	Saskatoon/Banga Air Aerodrome	PU		Banga International Air Ltd.	1,690 ft (520 m)		CJN5			52°00′02″N 106°27′45″W
Saskatoon	Saskatoon (Jim Pattison Children's Hospital) Heliport	PR		Saskatchewan Health Authority	1,758 ft (536 m)		CJP4			52°07′55″N 106°38′33″W
Saskatoon	Saskatoon John G. Diefenbaker International Airport	PU	200 (300)	Saskatoon Airport Authority	1,654 ft (504 m)	CYXE		YXE		52°10′15″N 106°41′59″W
Seabee Gold Mine	Seabee Mine Aerodrome	PR		SSR Mining, Seabee Gold	1,602 ft (488 m)		CCB2			55°41′19″N 103°36′39″W
Shaunavon	Shaunavon Airport	PU		Town of Shaunavon	3,027 ft (923 m)		CJC5			49°39′32″N 108°24′23″W
Shellbrook	Shellbrook Airport	PU		Town of Shellbrook	1,640 ft (500 m)		CJZ4			53°13′42″N 106°21′47″W
Southend	Southend/Hans Ulricksen Field Aerodrome	PR		Transwest Air	1,120 ft (340 m)		CKA9			56°20′11″N 103°17′37″W
Southend	Southend Water Aerodrome	PU		Lawrence Bay Airways	1,106 ft (337 m)		CKP5			56°20′16″N 103°17′02″W
Spiritwood	Spiritwood/H & M Fast Farms Aerodrome	PU		Harold Fast	2,250 ft (690 m)		CHM2			53°16′30″N 107°34′13″W
Spring Valley	Spring Valley (North) Airport	PU		B. Forman	2,200 ft (670 m)		CKP2			50°03′36″N 105°24′07″W
Stenen	Stenen/Clayton Air 3 Aerodrome	PR		Clayton Air Service	1,710 ft (520 m)		CCA5			51°49′28″N 102°22′35″W
Stony Rapids	Stony Rapids Airport	PU		Ministry of Highways and Infrastructure	801 ft (244 m)	CYSF		YSF		59°15′01″N 105°50′29″W
Stony Rapids	Stony Rapids Water Aerodrome	PU		Wings Over Kississing	686 ft (209 m)		CKW5			59°15′36″N 105°49′52″W
Swift Current	Swift Current Airport	PU		City of Swift Current	2,681 ft (817 m)	CYYN		YYN		50°17′31″N 107°41′24″W
Swift Current	Swift Current (Cypress Regional Hospital) Heliport	PR		Saskatchewan Health Authority	2,412 ft (735 m)		CCY2			50°18′39″N 107°46′27″W
Tisdale	Tisdale Airport	PU		Town of Tisdale	1,532 ft (467 m)		CJY3	YTT		52°50′12″N 104°04′00″W
Unity	Unity Aerodrome	PU		Town of Unity	2,090 ft (640 m)		CKE8			52°26′45″N 109°11′07″W
Uranium City	Uranium City Airport	PU		Ministry of Highways and Infrastructure	1,025 ft (312 m)	CYBE		YBE		59°33′41″N 108°28′53″W
Uranium City	Uranium City Water Aerodrome	PU		Urdel Ltd.	820 ft (250 m)		CKG6			59°34′00″N 108°36′00″W
Wadena	Wadena Airport	PU		Town of Wadena	1,740 ft (530 m)		CKS7			51°56′00″N 103°50′00″W
Wakaw	Wakaw Airport	PU		Town of Wakaw	1,660 ft (510 m)		CKT7			52°39′00″N 105°46′00″W
Watrous	Watrous Airport	PU		Town of Watrous	1,700 ft (520 m)		CKU7			51°41′07″N 105°22′12″W
Weyburn	Weyburn Airport	PU		Town of Weyburn	1,934 ft (589 m)		CJE3			49°41′51″N 103°48′03″W
Whitewood	Whitewood Airport	PU		Town of Whitewood	2,000 ft (610 m)		CKY2			50°20′00″N 102°16′00″W
Wynyard	Wynyard/W. B. Needham Field Aerodrome	PU		Town of Wynyard	1,746 ft (532 m)	CYYO				51°48′33″N 104°10′09″W
Yorkton	Yorkton Regional Airport (RCAF Station Yorkton)	PU		City of Yorkton	1,635 ft (498 m)	CYQV		YQV		51°15′53″N 102°27′42″W

== Defunct airports ==
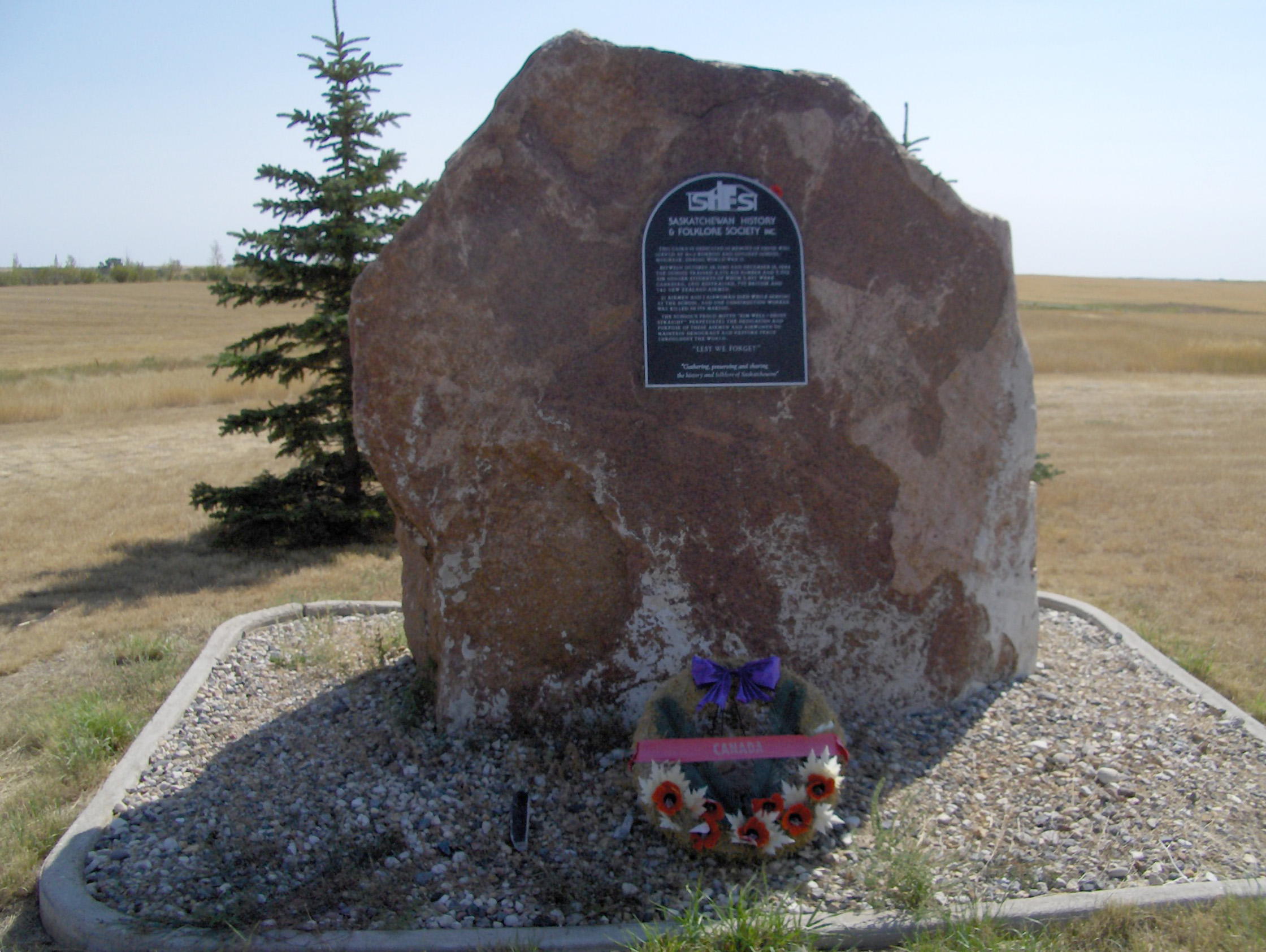
Cairn located on the edge of Saskatchewan Highway 2, at the entrance of the former airbase RCAF Station Mossbank

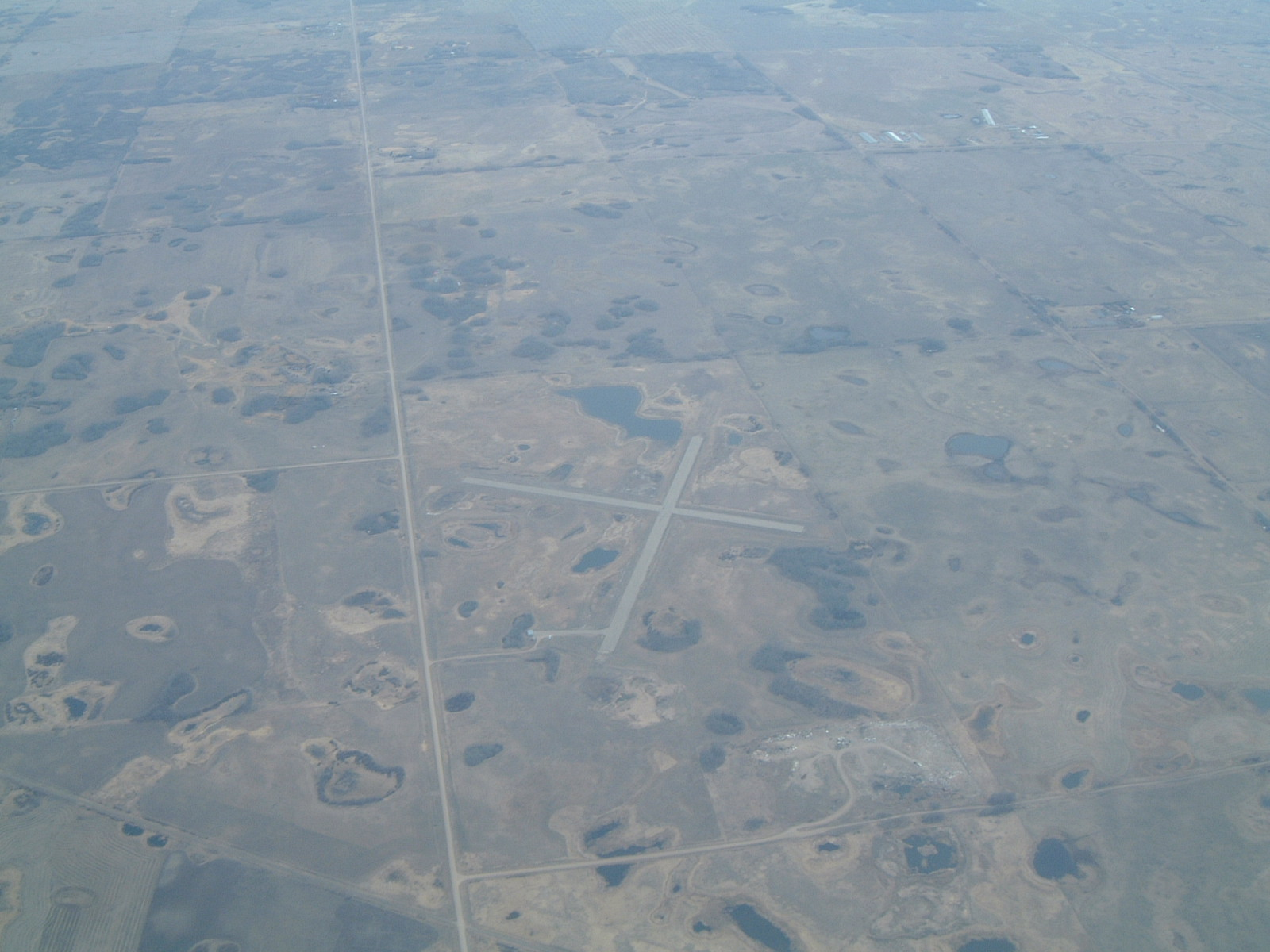
Melville Municipal Airport

Community	Airport name	ICAO	TC LID	IATA	Coordinates
Axe Lake oil sands	Axe Lake Aerodrome		CAX2		57°16′09″N 109°50′51″W
Beechy	Beechy Airport		CJH7		50°50′00″N 107°22′20″W
Buttress	Buttress Airfield				50°14′10″N 105°32′51″W
Canora	Canora Airport		CJR7		51°37′44″N 102°27′00″W
Caron	RCAF Station Caron				50°28′00″N 105°49′00″W
Churchbridge	Churchbridge Airport		CKV6		51°01′00″N 101°49′00″W
Cluff Lake mine	Cluff Lake Airport		CJS3		58°23′29″N 109°30′59″W
Cudworth	Cudworth Airport		CKS3		52°29′17″N 105°45′50″W
Cut Knife	Cut Knife Airport		CKU4		52°44′00″N 109°01′00″W
Dafoe	RCAF Station Dafoe				51°55′58″N 104°34′01″W
Davidson	RCAF Station Davidson				51°15′00″N 105°53′00″W
Davin Lake	Davin Lake Airport		CKW6		56°53′00″N 103°35′00″W
Dore Lake	Dore Lake Airport		CJE2		54°37′00″N 107°23′00″W
Eastend	Eastend Airport		CKK5		49°33′00″N 108°48′00″W
Estevan	RCAF Station Estevan				49°04′00″N 103°00′00″W
Estevan	Estevan/Bryant Airport		CKS6		49°24′36″N 103°08′37″W
Estevan	Estevan (South) Airport		CKK4		49°02′20″N 102°58′34″W
Ferland	Ferland Airport		CJH4		49°26′42″N 106°55′55″W
Gainsborough	Gainsborough Airport		CKY6		49°11′00″N 101°26′00″W
Hague	Hague/Guliker Field Aerodrome		CGF3		52°43′56″N 107°22′27″W
Hamlin	North Battleford/Hamlin Airport		CJD4		52°52′48″N 108°17′19″W
Hanley	Hanley Airport		CKJ4		51°37′27″N 106°26′32″W
Hidden Bay	Hidden Bay Airport		CKL4		58°08′00″N 103°47′00″W
Imperial	Imperial Airport		CKU5		51°21′00″N 105°24′00″W
La Loche	La Loche Water Aerodrome		CJY9		56°29′00″N 109°25′00″W
Leoville	Leoville Airport		CJT9		53°37′14″N 107°36′34″W
Lewvan	Lewvan (Farr Air) Airport		CLW2		49°59′06″N 104°06′54″W
Lumsden	Lumsden (Metz) Airport		CKR5		50°43′02″N 104°58′10″W
Melville	Melville Municipal Airport		CJV9		50°56′29″N 102°44′16″W
Mossbank	RCAF Station Mossbank				49°56′00″N 105°52′00″W
Missinipe	Otter Lake Airport		CJV4		55°34′52″N 104°47′06″W
Naicam	Naicam Airport		CJR9		52°24′41″N 104°29′02″W
Nipawin	Nipawin Water Aerodrome		CKU3		53°24′00″N 104°01′00″W
Outlook	Outlook Airport		CKR9		51°28′57″N 107°02′12″W
Paradise Hill	Paradise Hill Airport		CJE6		53°32′07″N 109°26′02″W
Radisson	Radisson Airport		CJL9		52°27′47″N 107°22′38″W
Redvers	Redvers Airport		CKA7		49°34′50″N 101°40′43″W
Rocanville	Rocanville Airport		CKH2		50°27′53″N 101°33′16″W
Spiritwood	Spiritwood Airport		CKH7		53°21′48″N 107°32′54″W
Thunder Rapids	Squaw Rapids Airport		CKQ2		53°40′43″N 103°21′00″W
Wawota	Wawota Airport		CKV7		49°54′00″N 102°02′00″W
West Poplar	West Poplar Airport		CJF5		49°00′00″N 106°23′00″W
Weyburn	RCAF Station Weyburn				49°42′00″N 103°48′00″W
White City	White City (Radomsky) Airport		CWC1		50°26′23″N 104°18′23″W
Wilkie	Wilkie Airport		CKW7		52°24′11″N 108°43′11″W
Willow Bunch	Willow Bunch Airport		CKZ2		49°24′00″N 105°40′00″W

== See also ==
- Transportation in Saskatchewan
- List of defunct airports in Canada
