= Lac la Hache 220 =

Indian reserve in Saskatchewan, Canada

Coordinates: 58°10′51″N 103°01′52″W

- Indian reserve
- Lac la Hache Indian Reserve No. 220
- Location in Saskatchewan
- First Nation: Hatchet Lake
- Country: Canada
- Province: Saskatchewan

Area
  - Total: 11,020 ha (27,200 acres)

Population (2016)
  - Total: 1,377
  - Density: 12.50/km^{2} (32.36/sq mi)
- Community Well-Being Index: 37

Lac la Hache 220 is an Indian reserve of the Hatchet Lake Dene Nation in Saskatchewan. It is about 354 kilometres (220 mi) north of Flin Flon. In the 2016 Canadian Census, it recorded a population of 1377 living in 260 of its 282 total private dwellings. In the same year, its Community Well-Being index was calculated at 37 of 100, compared to 58.4 for the average First Nations community and 77.5 for the average non-Indigenous community.

== See also ==
- List of Indian reserves in Saskatchewan
