= Floyd Glass =

Canadian businessman

Floyd Glass was born in Saskatchewan, Canada. He was an aviation entrepreneur who founded Athabaska Airways in 1955. Prince Albert (Glass Field) Airport is named in honor of Glass. Upon his death in 1999, his son Jim took over the company.
