= List of highways numbered 998 =

The following highways are numbered 998:

== United States ==
- Louisiana Highway 998
- MD 998, Maryland
- Pennsylvania Route 998 (former)
- Puerto Rico Highway 998 (former)
- Florida State Road 998

Preceded by 997	Lists of highways 998	Succeeded by 999
