= West Wind Aviation Flight 282 =

2017 aviation accident in Canada

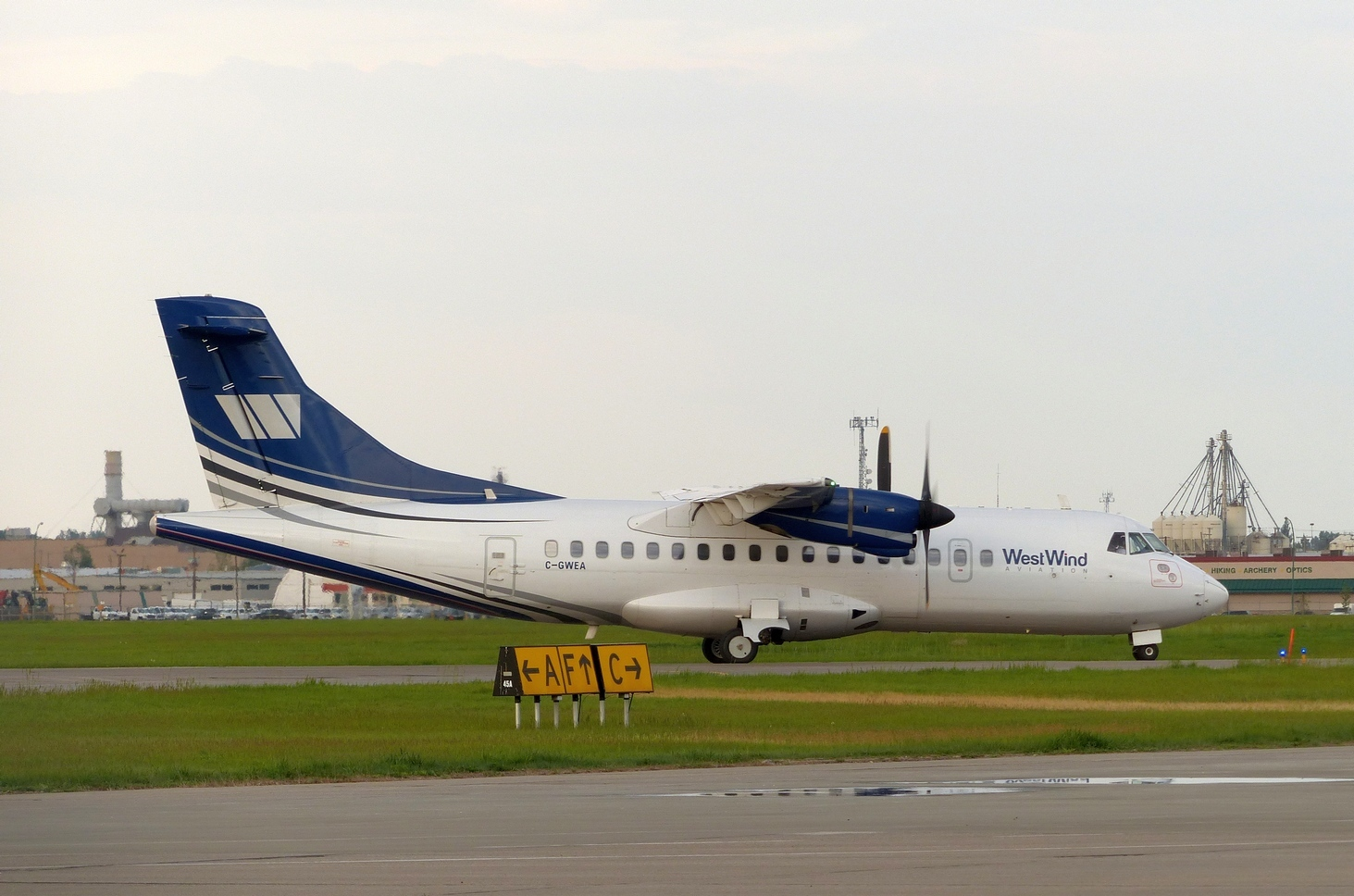
- C-GWEA, the aircraft involved in the accident, seen in 2016

Accident
- Date: 13 December 2017
- Summary: Loss of control due to atmospheric icing
- Site: Fond-du-Lac Airport, Fond-du-Lac, Saskatchewan, Canada; 59.3368°N 107.2019°W

Aircraft
- Aircraft type: ATR 42-320
- Operator: West Wind Aviation
- ICAO flight No.: WEW282
- Call sign: WEST WIND 282
- Registration: C-GWEA
- Flight origin: Fond-du-Lac Airport, Fond-du-Lac, Saskatchewan, Canada
- Destination: Stony Rapids Airport, Stony Rapids, Saskatchewan, Canada
- Occupants: 25
- Passengers: 22
- Crew: 3
- Fatalities: 1
- Injuries: 24
- Survivors: 24

West Wind Aviation Flight 282 was a domestic passenger flight from Fond-du-Lac Airport to Stony Rapids Airport, Canada. The aircraft was an ATR 42-320 registered C-GWEA. On 13 December 2017, shortly after taking off from Fond-du-Lac, the ATR-42 lost altitude and hit the ground. All 25 passengers and crew initially survived the crash, but one passenger later died of his injuries in hospital. Investigation into the cause determined that the crash was caused by ice contamination on the aircraft.

== Aircraft and crew ==
The aircraft was an ATR 42-320 registered C-GWEA and was equipped with two PW121 turboprop engines produced by Pratt & Whitney Canada. This type of aircraft has previously been associated with accidents due to ice forming on the wing in freezing weather. The most notable accident was American Eagle Flight 4184. Experts say that changes in procedures and aircraft systems have solved the problem.

The flight crew consisted of two captains. The one in command had been with the airline since 2010 and had 5,990 flight hours, including 1,500 hours on the ATR 42. The second captain (acting as a first officer on the accident flight), had been with the airline since 2000 and had 15,769 flight hours with 7,930 of them on the ATR 42.

== Accident ==
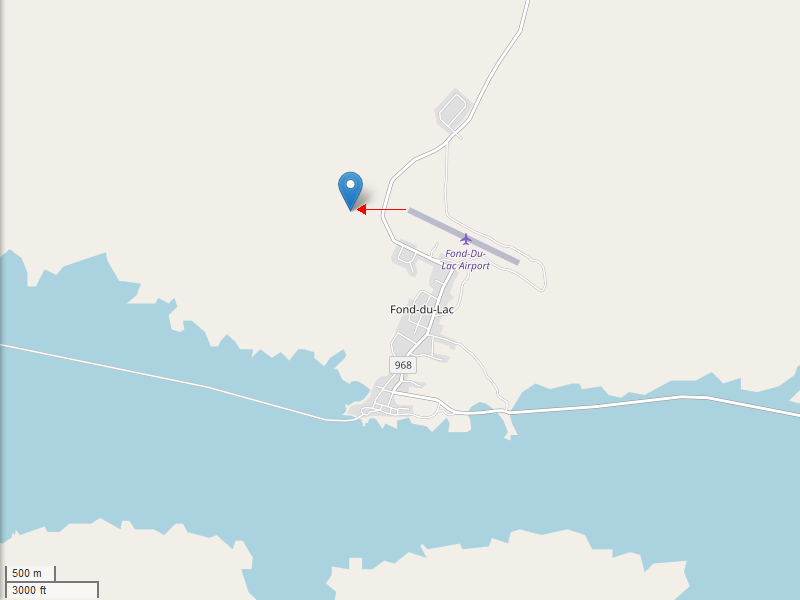
Crash location of West Wind Aviation Flight 282

The accident took place on December 13, 2017. According to the weather forecast, it was cloudy with temperature as low as −19 °C (−2 °F). At 6:15 pm local time, the aircraft began its takeoff roll from Fond-du-Lac Airport. During the initial climb stage, the aircraft lost altitude and impacted the terrain 600 metres (2,000 ft) away from the runway. There was an 800 foot (240 m) trail of debris. The aircraft finally came to a stop in the upright position yet tilted to the right. The most serious damage was on the left side of the airframe, where it ruptured near seats Row 3. There was no explosion nor fires at the crash site, but fuel leaks were found by nearby residents who rushed over for rescue work.

Survivors were initially trapped in the aircraft, with local residents helping to free some by cutting through the fuselage. Passengers attempting to escape found the emergency exits were unable to open, with four passengers taking half an hour to open an aft emergency exit. Passengers who were able to leave the aircraft guided local residents to the crash site. Alerts were sent out through Facebook, calling for more resources, and in 10–20 minutes more people arrived with blankets. Within a few hours, all aircraft occupants were rescued.

There were 25 people on board, including 22 passengers, 2 pilots and 1 flight attendant. Nobody was killed initially, but six passengers and one crew member received serious injuries, at least five of whom were transported to hospital via air ambulance. The other 18 aircraft occupants received minor injuries. A 19-year-old passenger died on 25 December 2017 as a result of his injuries.

== Investigation ==
Transportation Safety Board of Canada launched the investigation. BEA, ATR (aircraft manufacturer), Pratt & Whitney Canada (engine manufacturer), and Transport Canada also sent representatives to the site. Flight recorders were recovered and sent to the lab in Ottawa.

West Wind Aviation's air operator certificate was suspended on 22 December 2017 by Transport Canada, due to deficiencies in the company's operational control system. They were allowed to fly again on May 8, 2018, after Transport Canada said West Wind had addressed the regulator's concerns about deficiencies in the company's operational control system.

A year after the crash, the preliminary investigation made by the Canadian TSB suggested that icing might have largely contributed to the crash. The departure airport of Flight 282, Fond-du-Lac Airport, was not equipped with adequate deicing equipment. Polls conducted by TSB also revealed that at least 40% of pilots rarely or never have their aircraft de-iced in remote airports. Due to these findings, recommendation on better de-icing procedure throughout remote Canadian airports was issued to Transport Canada. Subsequently, investigators ruled out engine failure as likely cause of the crash. The final TSB report attributed the crash to icing.
