= List of highways numbered 997 =

State Road 997, Route 997, or Highway 997, may refer to:

== United States ==
- SR 997
- MD 997
- PA 997
- PR-997

Preceded by 996	Lists of highways 997	Succeeded by 998
