= Camsell Portage =

Northern settlement in Saskatchewan, Canada

Coordinates: 59°36′N 109°15′W

Camsell Portage in Saskatchewan

Camsell Portage is a northern settlement in the far northwest of Saskatchewan that now constitutes as a ghost town, located on the north-central shore of Lake Athabasca, Saskatchewan. The northern settlement is an unincorporated community in the Northern Administration District.

Camsell is one of the few remaining fly-in communities served by the school division. During winter, residents can travel to Uranium City by snowmobile, and there is also a road connecting Camsell Portage to the community of Waterloo Lake. The school closed on June 26, 2007 due to low enrollment. Despite its remote location, Camsell Portage has satellite television and high speed internet services.

Camsell Portage is about 14 km (8.7 mi) west of the Waterloo Lake camp and 36 km (22 mi) west of Uranium City by air via Camsell Portage Airport.

The Athabasca System Hydroelectric Stations operated by SaskPower east of the community include the Charlot River Dam and Power Station, the Waterloo Dam and Power Station and the Wellington Dam and Power Station.

== Demographics ==
In the 2021 Census of Population conducted by Statistics Canada, Camsell Portage had a population of 0 living in of its total private dwellings, a change of −100% from its 2016 population of 10. With a land area of 4.14 km^{2} (1.60 sq mi), it had a population density of 0.0/km^{2} (0.0/sq mi) in 2021.

== See also ==
- Saskatchewan Highway 999
- Charlot River Airport
