= List of highways numbered 999 =

The following highways or routes are numbered 999.

== Canada ==
- Saskatchewan Highway 999

== Israel ==
- Route 999 (Israel)

== Netherlands ==
- N999 (Netherlands)

== United States ==
- MD 999 (former)
- PA 999
- FM 999
- Puerto Rico Highway 999 (former)

Preceded by 998	Lists of highways 999	Succeeded by 1000–1499
