= Rise Air =

Airline in Saskatchewan, Canada

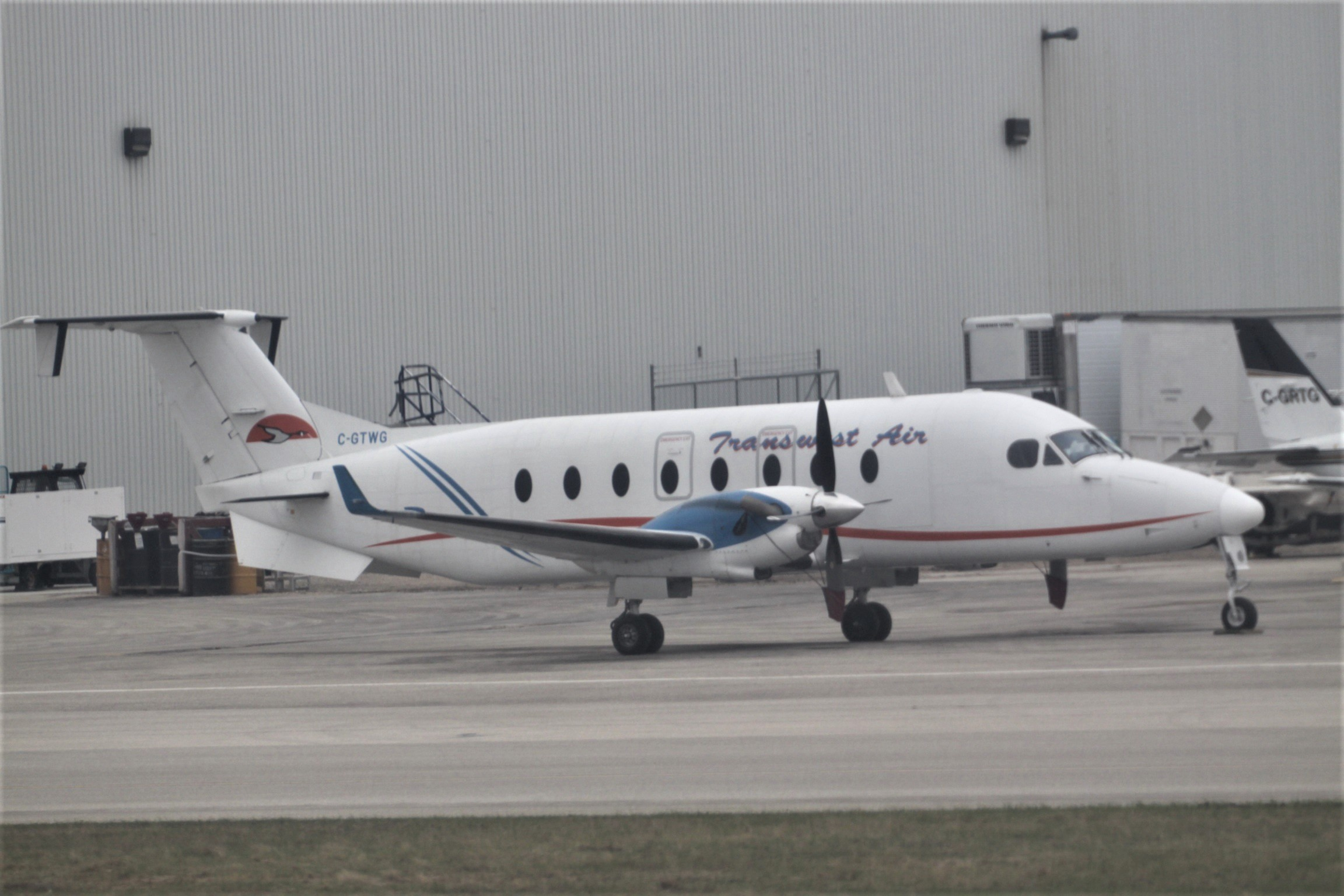
- A Beechcraft 1900 at Winnipeg James Armstrong Richardson International, with the airline's old name and logo
IATA	CDD	Call sign
4T	RS	RISE AIR
- Founded: 2021
- AOC #: 12508
- Hubs: Prince Albert (Glass Field) Airport; Saskatoon John G. Diefenbaker International Airport
- Secondary hubs: Stony Rapids Airport; Fond-du-Lac Airport; Wollaston Lake Airport (charter base)
- Focus cities: Saskatoon John G. Diefenbaker International Airport
- Fleet size: 28
- Destinations: 8
- Headquarters: Saskatoon, Saskatchewan
- Key people: Derek Nice (President / CEO); Rick Philipenko (VP Finance); Tracy Young-McLean (VP Operations & Human Resources)
- Employees: 300
- Website: riseair.ca

Rise Air is a scheduled and charter airline primarily serving the Canadian province of Saskatchewan. Its headquarters and main base are in Saskatoon.

Rise Air, a First Nations owned airline, was formed in 2021 by the merger of Transwest Airlines and West Wind Aviation. Transwest Airlines, was formed by the merger La Ronge Aviation, and Athabaska Airways. The company offered not only scheduled passenger services, but fishing charters, surveying work, forest fire fighting, and medevac operations.

Rise Air's equipment includes Twin Otters, King Air 200s, Beaver, ATR 42-320/500s, ATR 72s, Beech 1900s and Saab 340 regional turboprop airliners. The company also operates La Ronge Water Aerodrome, Stony Rapids Water Aerodrome, and Southend/Hans Ulricksen Field Aerodrome. Rise Air as of late has been significantly scaling back summer float operations, and has been threatening to ‘park’ their Saab 340A model for many years. The company has stated plans to become an authorized and licensed ATR service and manufacturing centre. Rise Air also has maintenance bases in Saskatoon, Prince Albert, La Ronge, and Stony Rapids. Transwest Air was bought by West Wind Aviation on June 30, 2016.

In January 2021, it was announced that West Wind Aviation would be merged with Transwest Air, and would be renamed Rise Air.

== History ==
Athabaska Airways was founded by Floyd Glass, who learned to fly in the late 1930s, then served as a military flying training instructor during the Second World War. Postwar, he was the first general manager of the provincial Crown corporation Saskatchewan Government Airways. He resigned from this post, flew briefly with British Columbia's Queen Charlotte Airways, then returned to Saskatchewan and in 1955 formed his own firm, Athabaska Airways, which later existed under the name "Transwest Air". Glass died in 1999. In June 2016, West Wind Aviation put forward a letter of intent to purchase Transwest Air. The company became a subsidiary of West Wind Aviation on July 1, 2016.

In January 2021, it was announced West Wind Aviation would be merged with Transwest Air and be renamed Rise Air.

== Passenger services ==
As of July 2023, Rise Air offers scheduled flights to and from:

Country	Province/territory	City	Airport	Notes
Canada	Saskatchewan	Fond du Lac Denesuline First Nation	Fond-du-Lac Airport	
Canada	Saskatchewan	La Ronge	La Ronge (Barber Field) Airport	Hub (secondary)
Canada	Saskatchewan	Points North Landing	Points North Landing Airport	
Canada	Saskatchewan	Prince Albert	Prince Albert (Glass Field) Airport	Focus city
Canada	Saskatchewan	Saskatoon	Saskatoon John G. Diefenbaker International Airport	Hub (primary)
Canada	Saskatchewan	Stony Rapids	Stony Rapids Airport	Focus city
Canada	Saskatchewan	Uranium City	Uranium City Airport	
Canada	Saskatchewan	Hatchet Lake Denesuline First Nation (Wollaston Lake)	Wollaston Lake Airport	

== Fleet ==
As of 21 October 2026, Rise Air had 28 aircraft registered with Transport Canada.

=== Current fleet ===
Transwest Air fleet
Aircraft	Number	Variants	Passengers	Notes
Aérospatiale ATR 42	6	3 - ATR 42-300; 1 - ATR 42-320; 2 - ATR 42-500	44	Turboprop
Aérospatiale ATR 72	3	ATR 72-212A	68	
Beechcraft 1900	4	1900D	19	Can be configured for cargo.
Beechcraft Super King Air	5	B200	8	Medevac configuration
de Havilland Canada DHC-2 Beaver	1	MK. I	6	Wheels, skis or floats, not listed at Rise Air
de Havilland Canada DHC-6 Twin Otter	6	1 - Series 100; 3 - Series 200; 2 - Series 300	14	Wheels, skis or floats
Pilatus PC-12	2	PC-12/45	9	
Saab 340	1	340B	34	
Total	28			

=== Former fleet ===
Transwest used to operate British Aerospace BAe Jetstream 31 twin turboprop aircraft, the Beechcraft Model 99, the Beechcraft Baron, Beechcraft Travel Air, Cessna 441 Conquest II, Mitsubishi MU-2 and the Piper PA-31.

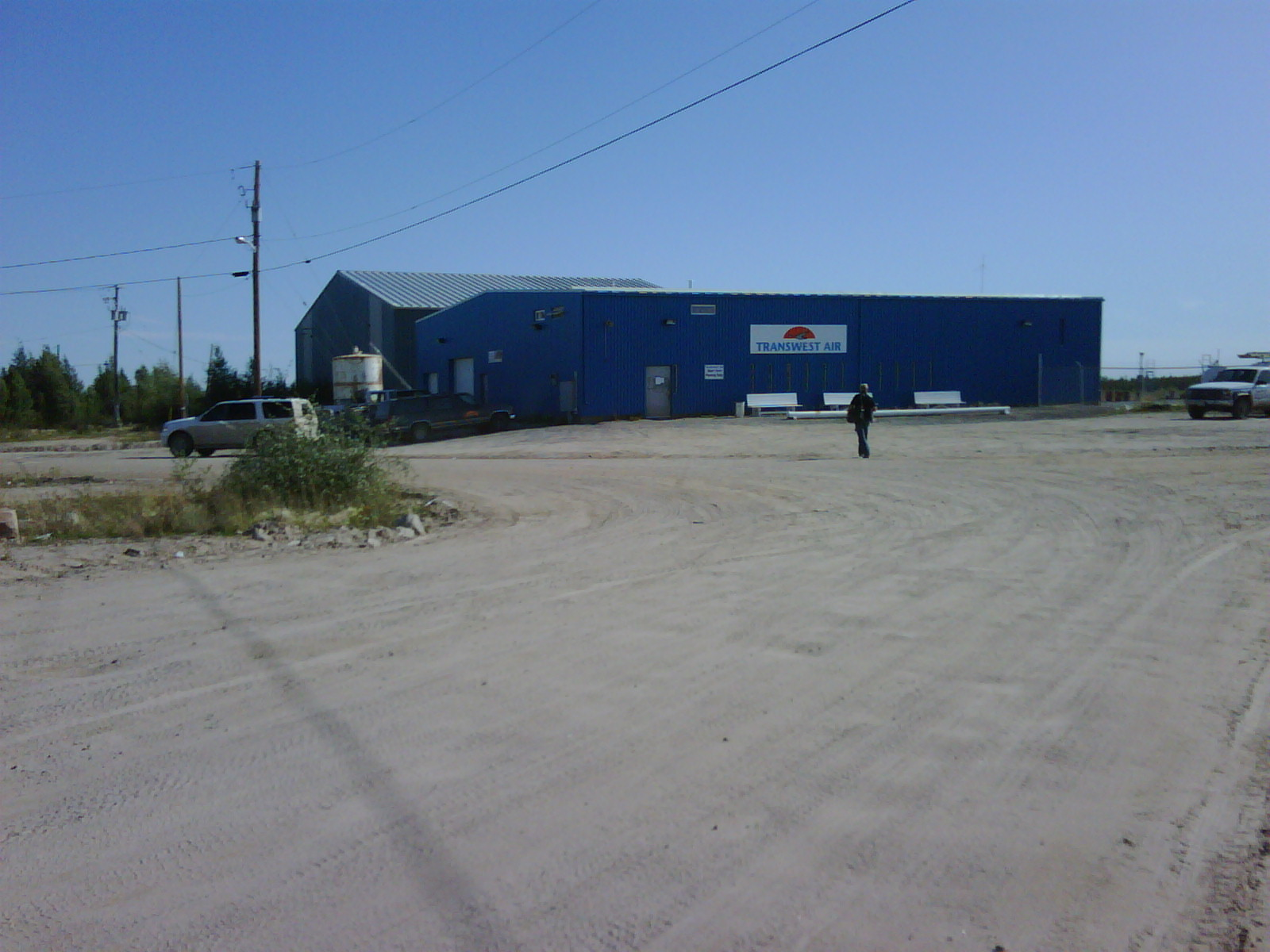
Transwest Air Terminal at Stony Rapids Airport

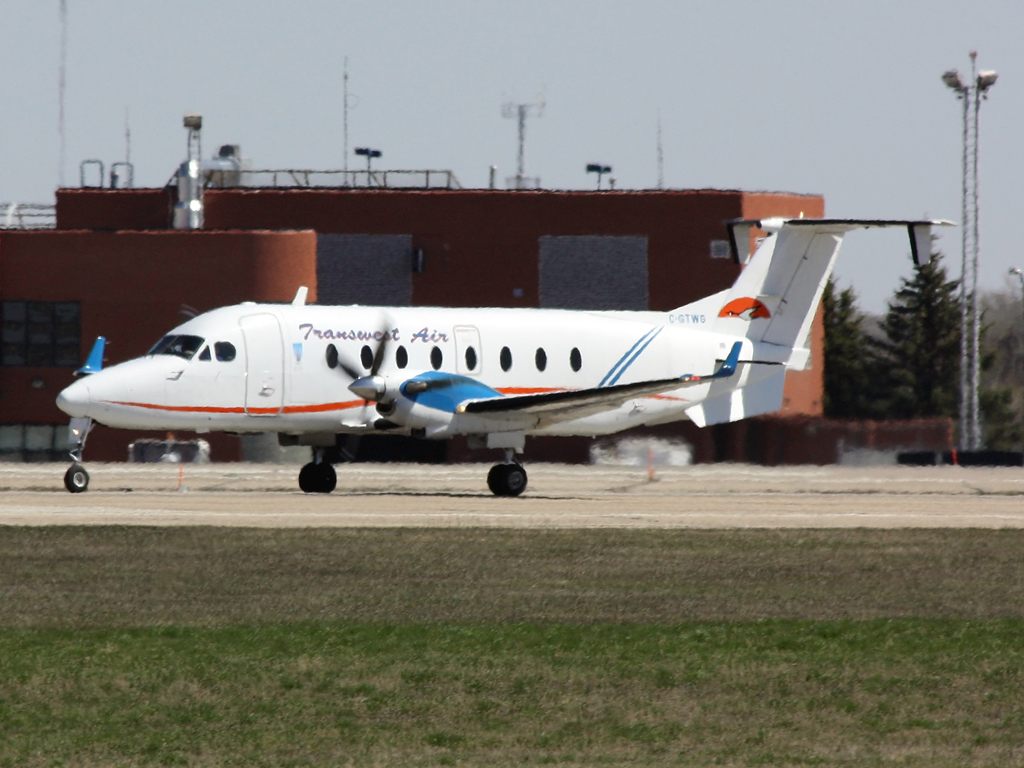
Transwest Air Beech 1900D C-GTWG at Regina International Airport

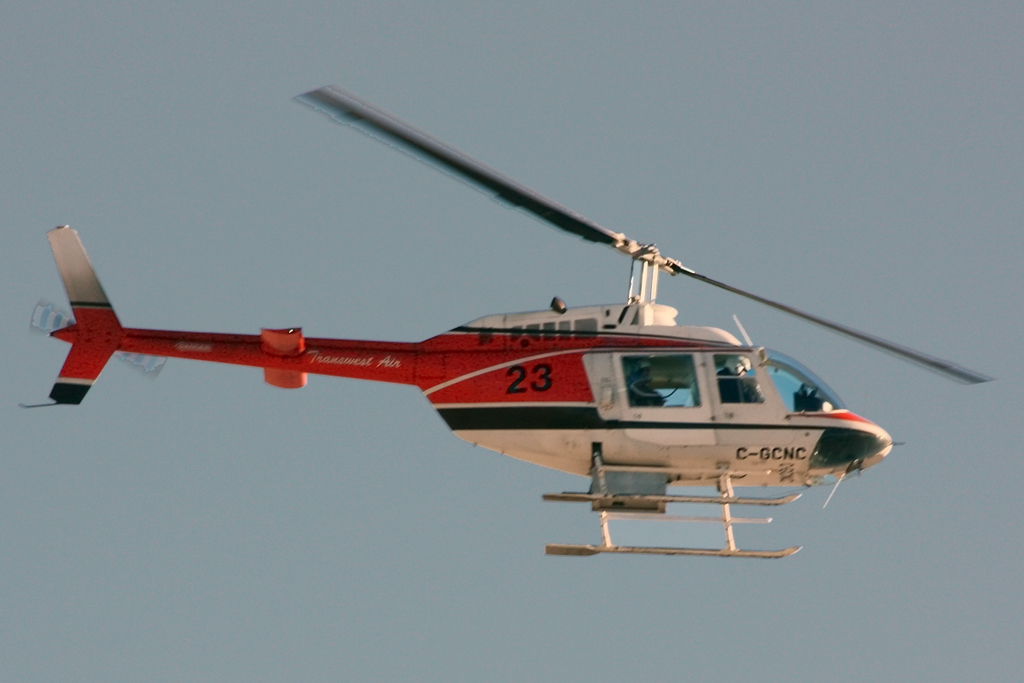
A former Transwest Air Bell 206B helicopter C-GCNC at Regina International Airport

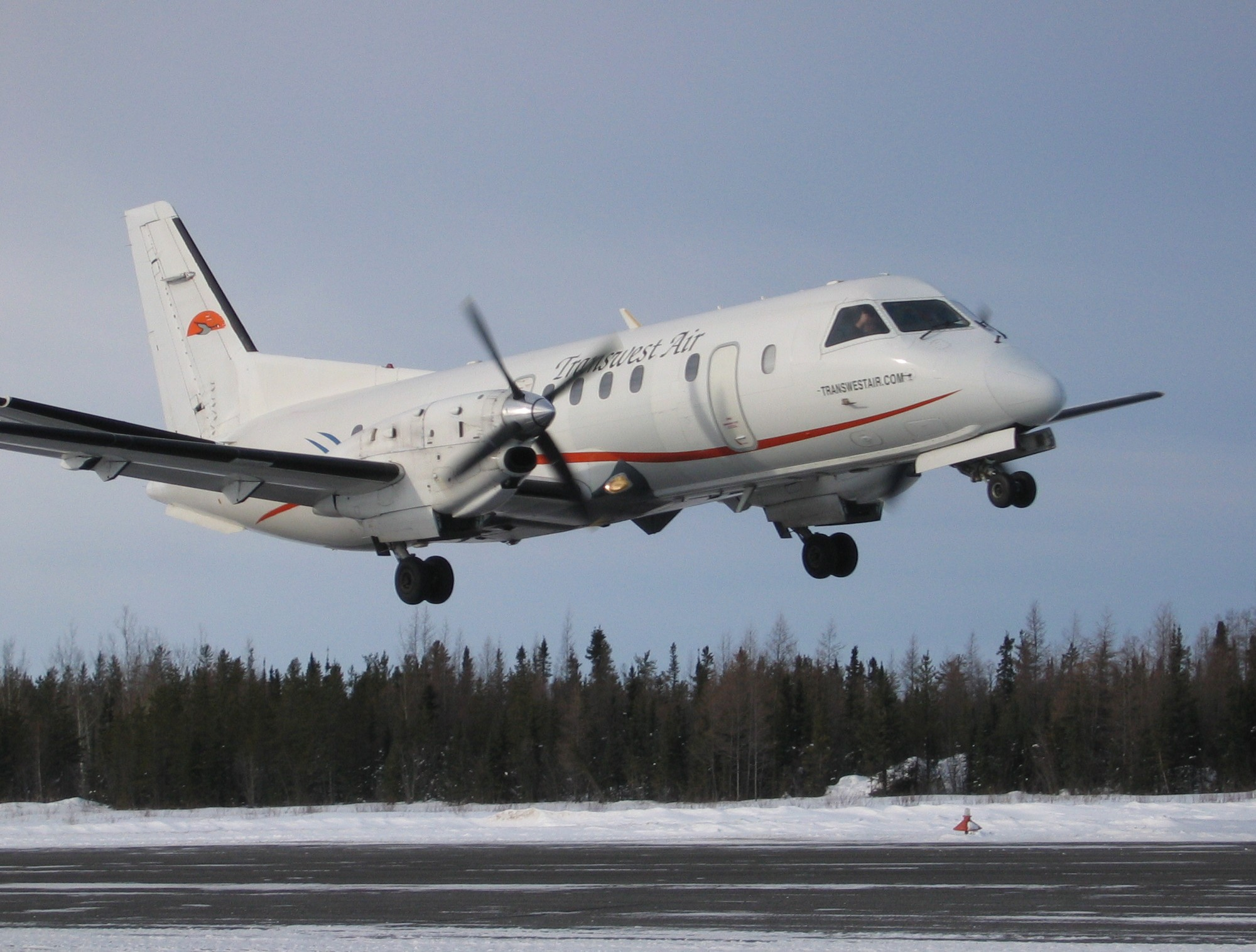
Transwest Air Saab 340A C-GKCY
