= West Wind Aviation =

Canadian airline

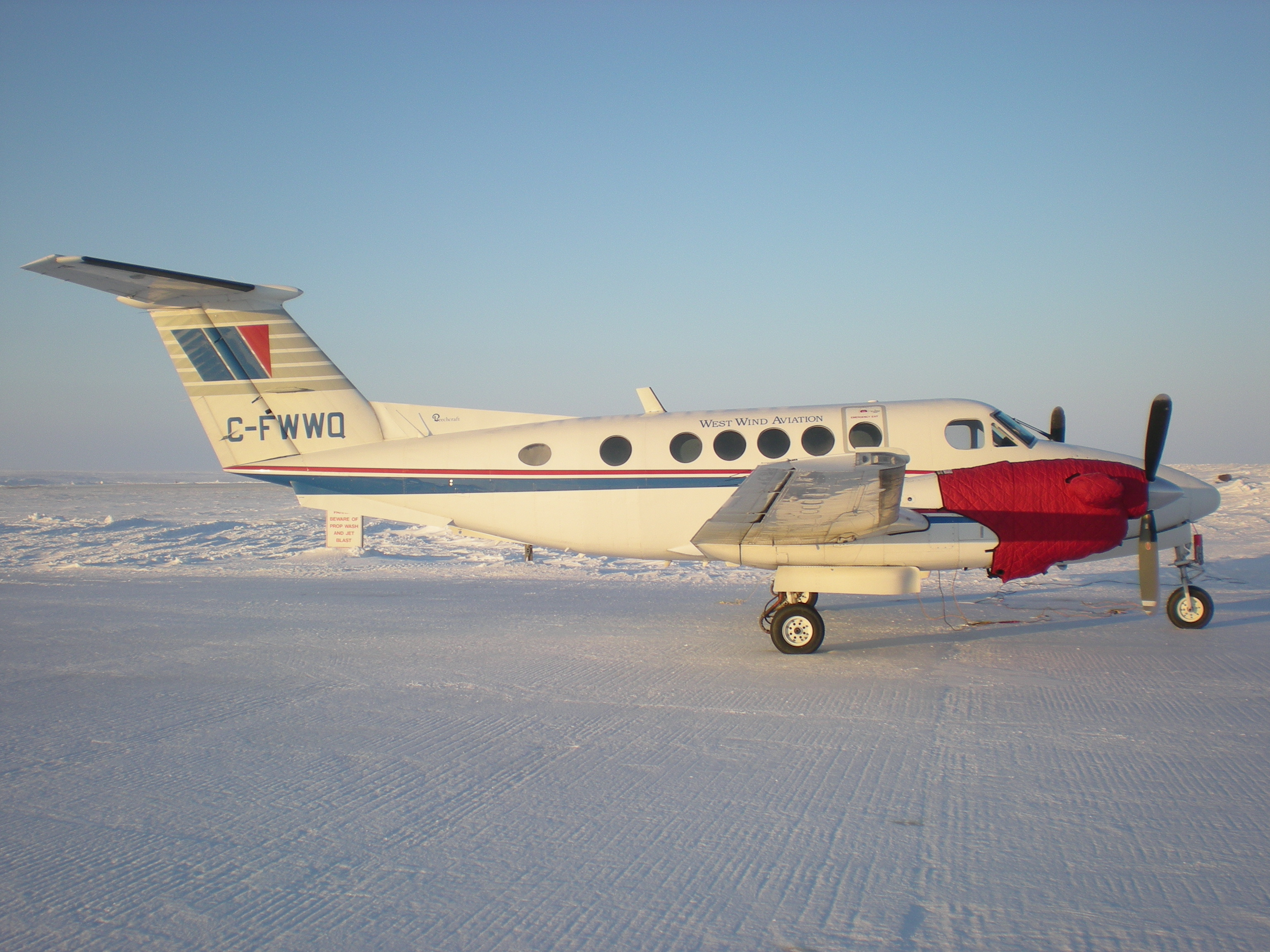
- A Beechcraft Super King Air at Cambridge Bay Airport
IATA	ICAO	Call sign
—	WEW	WESTWIND
- Founded: 1983
- Ceased operations: 2021
- AOC #: 12604
- Hubs: Saskatoon John G. Diefenbaker International Airport
- Focus cities: Regina, Prince Albert
- Fleet size: 3
- Destinations: Saskatoon, Regina
- Headquarters: Saskatoon, Saskatchewan
- Key people: Michael Rodyniuk (President & CEO)
- Website: http://www.westwindaviation.ca http://www.expressairclub.ca

West Wind Aviation Limited Partnership was a Saskatchewan based airline, now operating as Rise Air following its merger with Trans West Air in 2021.

== Destinations ==
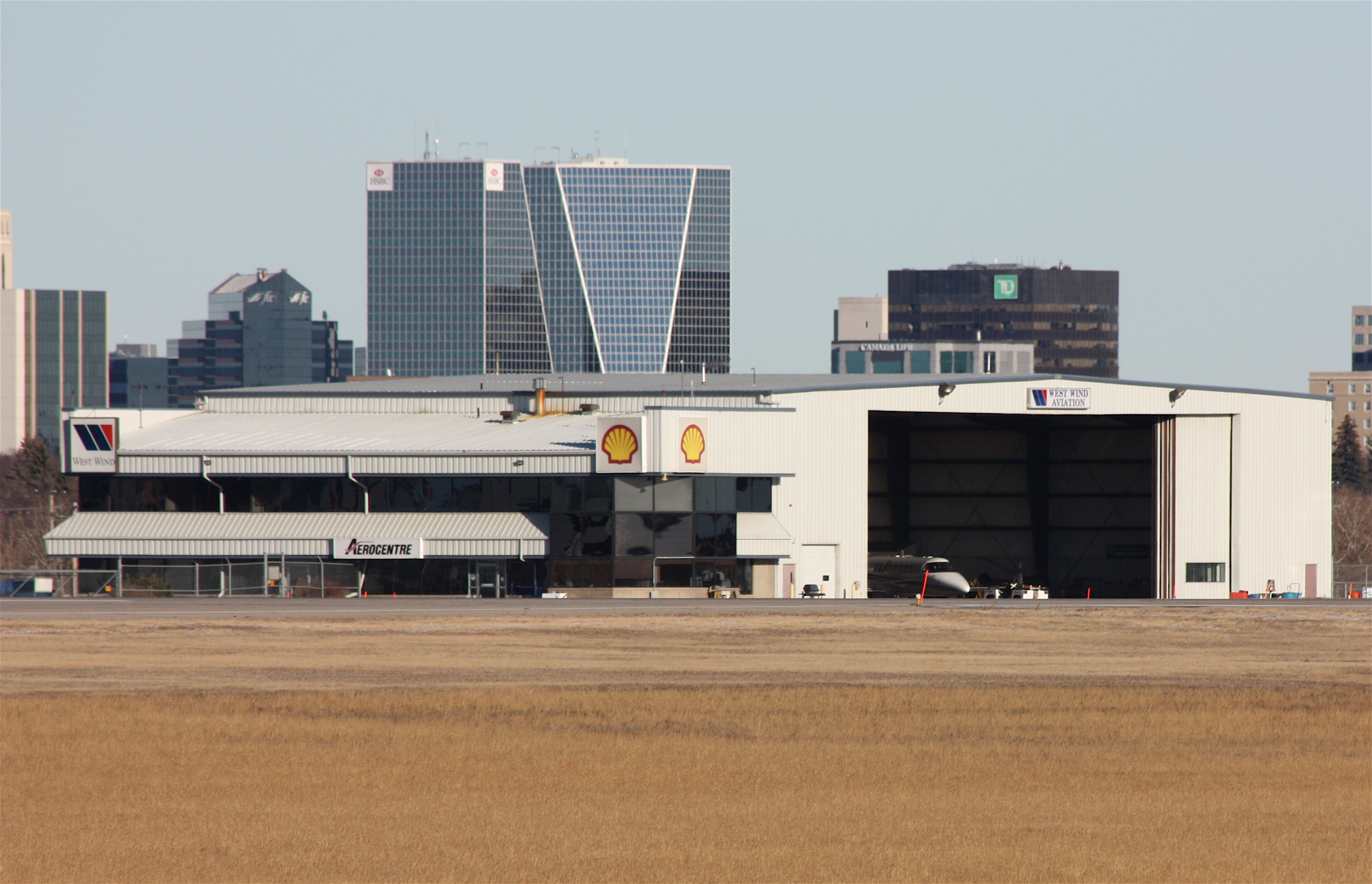
West Wind hangar in Regina

Under its ExpressAir banner, West Wind formerly offered scheduled service between Regina, Saskatoon and Prince Albert. Service in northern Saskatchewan and Nunavut were provided under the Pronto Airways banner. In 2015 West Wind Aviation absorbed Osprey Wings which was established in 1979.

Its main commercial rival was Prince Albert-based Transwest Air which became a subsidiary of West Wind Aviation July 1, 2016, and all scheduled flights are operated by Transwest.

In January 2021, it was announced West Wind Aviation will be merged with Transwest Air and renamed Rise Air.

== Fleet ==
As of February 2020, West Wind Aviation had the following aircraft registered with Transport Canada.

West Wind Aviation
Aircraft	Number	Variants	Notes
ATR 42	3	300 series, 320 series	44/46 passengers.
Beechcraft 1900	n/a	1900C, 1900D	19 passengers, and is versatile enough to land on gravel and pavement airstrips. Not listed by Transport Canada.
Beechcraft Super King Air	n/a	200 series	8 passengers, MEDIVAC capable. Not listed by Transport Canada.
de Havilland Canada DHC-6 Twin Otter	n/a	300 series	19 passengers. Not listed by Transport Canada.

In addition the Transport Canada site lists a Cessna 414 and three Cessna 401s (one Cessna 401 and two Cessna 401B) with cancelled certificates.

== Aviation services ==
West Wind operates fixed-base operations at the Saskatoon and Regina airports under Shell Canada's AeroCentre franchise. Under the International Air Services brand, West Wind provides airport terminal services to charter and international airlines at the Saskatoon, Regina and Winnipeg airports. In addition, under the Lancaster Fuel brand, the company provides aviation fuel to smaller airports and private operators in the province.

== Accidents ==
- West Wind Aviation Flight 280, an ATR42 aircraft crashed with 22 passengers and 3 crew on board at Fond-du-Lac, approximately 1 km from the airport, immediately after taking off from the airport, on December 13, 2017. The aircraft was destroyed but everyone on board initially survived, 1 passenger died of his injuries 12 days later.

=== Repercussions ===
On December 22, 2017, West Wind Aviation's air operator certificate was suspended by Transport Canada. Transport Canada cited the reason in a news release stating that the airline has deficiencies in its safety management system. Transport Canada also mentioned that the airline lost its Operator Certificate in the interest of public safety. "In the interest of public safety, Transport Canada suspended West Wind Aviation's Air Operator Certificate and will not allow the company to resume its commercial air service until it demonstrates compliance with aviation safety regulations".

Transport Canada reinstated West Wind's license to operate on May 8, 2018. Operations have since resumed.
