= Prince Albert (Glass Field) Airport =

Airport in Saskatchewan, Canada

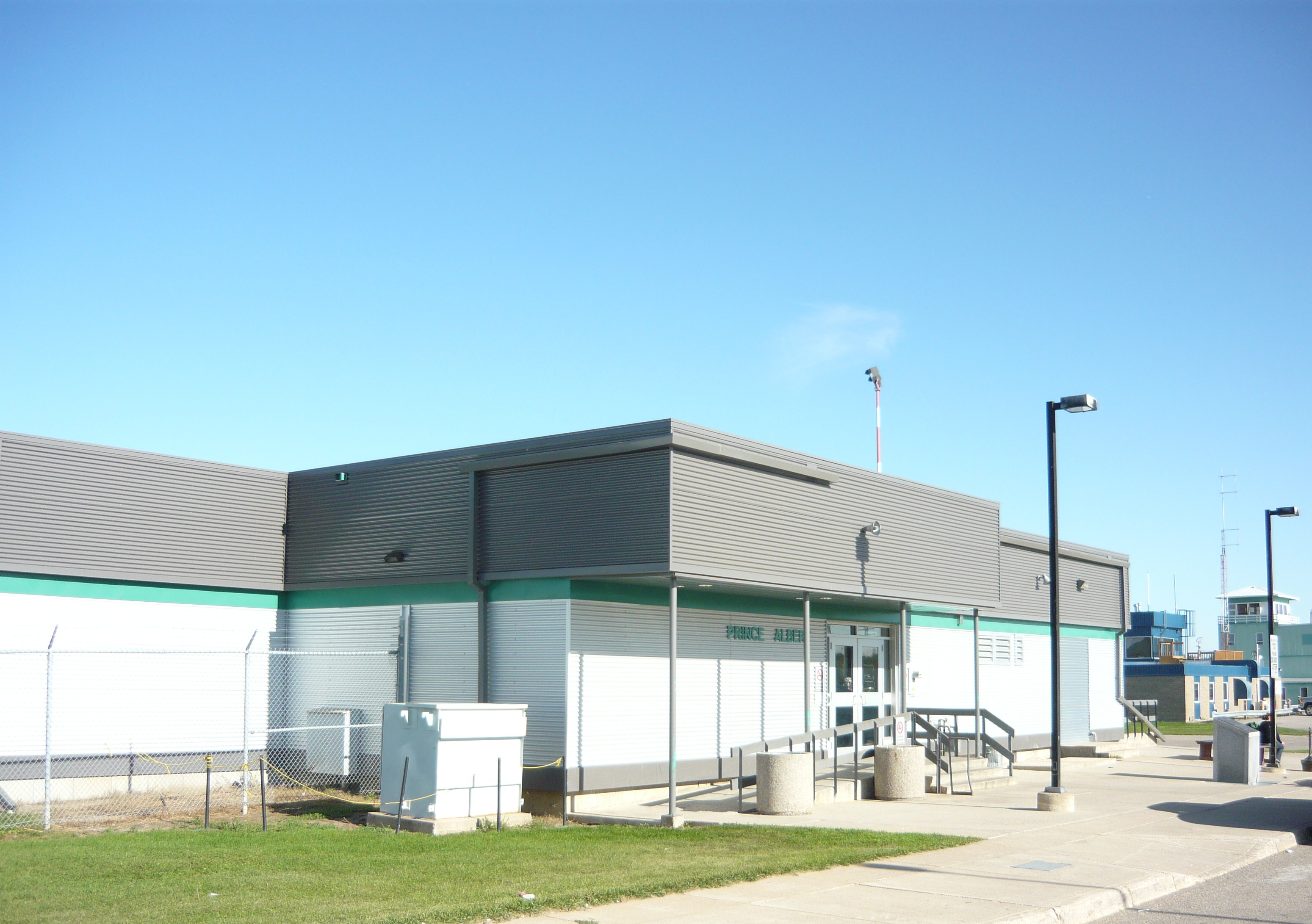
- IATA: YPA; ICAO: CYPA; WMO: 71869

Summary
- Airport type: Public
- Operator: City of Prince Albert
- Serves: Prince Albert
- Location: Prince Albert, Saskatchewan
- Hub for: Pronto Airways; Transwest Air
- Time zone: CST (UTC−06:00)
- Elevation AMSL: 1,405 ft / 428 m
- Coordinates: 53°12′52″N 105°40′23″W
- Website: https://www.citypa.ca/en/parking-streets-and-transportation/prince-albert-airport.aspx

Map
- Location in Saskatchewan CYPA (Canada)

Runways
Direction	Length		Surface
Direction	ft	m	Surface
08/26	5,001	1,524	Asphalt

Statistics (2010)
- Aircraft movements: 20,119
- Sources: Canada Flight Supplement; Environment Canada; Movements from Statistics Canada

Prince Albert (Glass Field) Airport (IATA: YPA, ICAO: CYPA) is located 1 nautical mile (1.9 km; 1.2 mi) northeast of Prince Albert, Saskatchewan, Canada.

== History ==
=== RCAF Station Prince Albert ===
The airport was originally opened near Prince Albert on 22 July 1940 under the British Commonwealth Air Training Plan as No. 6 Elementary Flying Training School, with Relief Landing Fields located near Hagen and Emma Lake. The school closed on 15 November 1944.

From 17 March 1941 to 11 November 1942, the station also hosted No. 6 Air Observer School.

Not much remains of the former No. 6 EFTS. A monument was erected to pay tribute to the 17 airmen and one civilian who died in training accidents at the school.

=== RCAF Aerodrome Prince Albert c.1942 ===
In approximately 1942, the aerodrome was listed at 53°13′N 105°41′W with a variation of 20 degrees east and elevation of 1,400 ft (430 m). Three serviceable runways were listed as follows:

Runway name	Length	Width	Surface
3/21	3,400 ft (1,000 m)	600 ft (180 m)	Turf field - irregular
10/28	3,000 ft (910 m)	600 ft (180 m)	Turf field - irregular
16/34	3,000 ft (910 m)	600 ft (180 m)	Turf field - irregular

=== Relief landing field — Hagen ===
A relief landing field for RCAF Station Prince Albert was located approximately 18 mi (29 km) southeast. The site was located west of the hamlet of Hagen, Saskatchewan. The relief field was a square, turf, all way field measuring 2,100 ft × 2,100 ft (640 m × 640 m).

In approximately 1942, the aerodrome was listed at 52°57′N 105°40′W with a variation of 20 degrees east and an unlisted elevation.

A review of Google Maps satellite imagery on 7 June 2018 shows no details indicating an airfield at the listed coordinates.

== Name ==
This airport is now named for Floyd Glass, who learned to fly in the late 1930s, then served as a military flying training instructor during the Second World War. Postwar, he was the first general manager of Saskatchewan Government Airways, a provincial Crown corporation . He resigned from this post, flew briefly with British Columbia's Queen Charlotte Airways, then returned to Saskatchewan and in 1955 formed his own firm, Athabaska Airways. Glass died in 1999.

== Airlines and destinations ==
Rise Air operates charters for staff working at northern mine sites for Cameco and Orano.

=== Passenger ===
Airlines	Destinations
Rise Air	Fond-du-Lac, La Ronge, Points North, Saskatoon, Stony Rapids, Uranium City, Wollaston

== See also ==
- Prince Albert (Fire Centre) Heliport
- List of airports in Saskatchewan
