= Ministry of Environment (Saskatchewan) =

Saskatchewan Public Safety Agency
- Le ministère de l'Environnement

Organization overview
- Formed: 1972
- Minister responsible: Warren Kaeding
- Deputy Ministers responsible: Sarah Harrison
- Parent Organization: Government of Saskatchewan
- Website: www.saskatchewan.ca/environment

The Ministry of Environment is responsible for government programs associated with environmental protection in the province of Saskatchewan, Canada.

== Forest Protection Office and Forest firefighting ==
The province of Saskatchewan owns a fleet of Bombardier CL-215T as aerial firefighting bombers.
