= Fond-du-Lac Airport =

Airport in Saskatchewan, Canada

- IATA: ZFD; ICAO: CZFD

Summary
- Airport type: Public
- Operator: Ministry of Highways
- Location: Fond du Lac Denesuline First Nation, Saskatchewan
- Time zone: CST (UTC−06:00)
- Elevation AMSL: 796 ft / 243 m
- Coordinates: 59°20′04″N 107°10′55″W

Map
- Location in Saskatchewan CZFD (Canada)

Runways
Direction	Length		Surface
Direction	ft	m	Surface
10/28	3,805	1,160	Paved - Thin Bituminous Surface
- Sources: Canada Flight Supplement

Fond-du-Lac Airport (IATA: ZFD, ICAO: CZFD) is located 1 nautical mile (1.9 km) north of Fond du Lac Denesuline First Nation, Saskatchewan, Canada.

== Airlines and destinations ==
=== Passenger ===
Airlines	Destinations
Rise Air	Prince Albert, Saskatoon, Stony Rapids, Uranium City

== Accidents ==
West Wind Aviation Flight 282, an ATR 42 aircraft crashed with 22 passengers and three crew members on board at Fond du Lac Denesuline First Nation, approximately 1 km (0.62 mi) from the airport, immediately after taking off from the airport, on December 13, 2017. The aircraft was destroyed but everyone on board initially survived, although some had serious injuries. One passenger, Arsen Fern Jr., died of his injuries two weeks after the accident.

== See also ==
- List of airports in Saskatchewan
