= Saskatoon John G. Diefenbaker International Airport =

Airport located in Saskatoon, Saskatchewan, Canada

Saskatoon John G. Diefenbaker International Airport Saskatoon International Airport

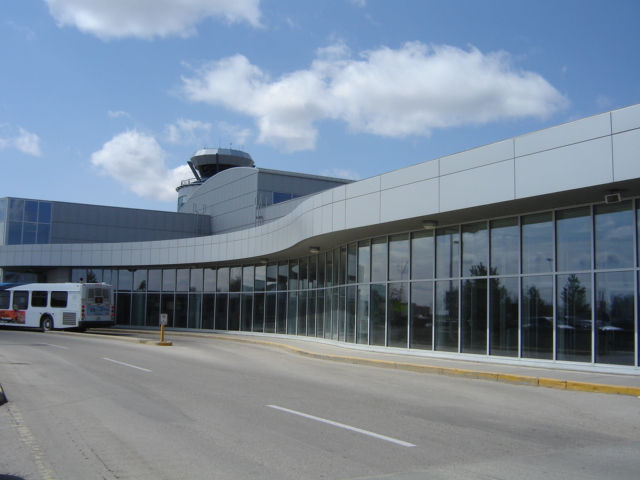
- IATA: YXE; ICAO: CYXE; WMO: 71866

Summary
- Airport type: Public
- Owner: Transport Canada
- Operator: Saskatoon Airport Authority
- Serves: Saskatoon metropolitan area
- Hub for: Rise Air; Express Air
- Time zone: CST (UTC−06:00 - no DST)
- Elevation AMSL: 1,654 ft (504 m)
- Coordinates: 52°10′15″N 106°42′00″W
- Public transit access: Saskatoon Transit 11
- Website: yxe.ca

Map
- Location in Saskatchewan CYXE (Canada)

Runways
Direction	Length		Surface
Direction	ft	m	Surface
09/27	8,300	2,530	Asphalt
15/33	6,200	1,890	Asphalt

Statistics (2024)
- Aircraft movements: 78,913
- Total passengers: 1,469,224
- Sources: Canada Flight Supplement, Transport Canada; Environment Canada; Movements from Statistics Canada; Passengers from Business View Magazine (p. 13)

Saskatoon John G. Diefenbaker International Airport (IATA: YXE, ICAO: CYXE) is an international airport (Note: Although named an international airport, Saskatoon John G. Diefenbaker International Airport is not classified as an international airport by Transport Canada) located 3 nautical miles (5.6 km; 3.5 mi) north-west of downtown Saskatoon, Saskatchewan, though still within its city limits. The airport is served by passenger, courier and air freight operators. It is named for John Diefenbaker, the 13th prime minister of Canada.

The airport has nine passenger bridges, three ground loading positions, 32 check-in points, and a customs/immigration arrivals area.

The airport is classified as an airport of entry by Nav Canada and is staffed by the Canada Border Services Agency (CBSA). CBSA officers at this airport can handle aircraft with no more than 200 passengers, however, they can handle up to 300 if the aircraft is unloaded in stages.

In 2024, the airport handled 1,469,224 passengers, making it Canada's 13th busiest.

== History ==
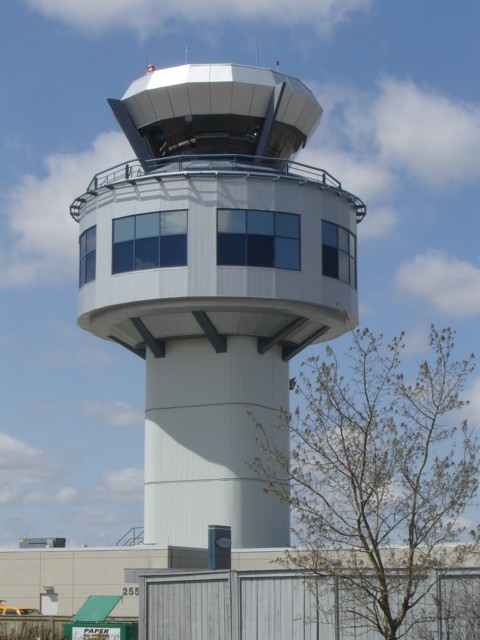
NAV CANADA control tower, constructed in 2000

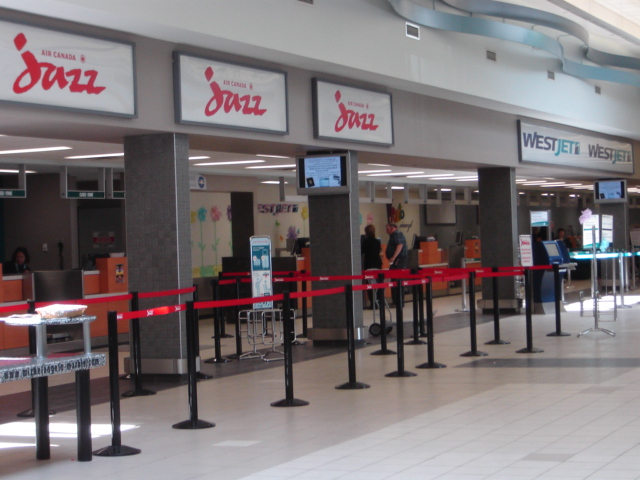
Check-in for Air Canada and WestJet

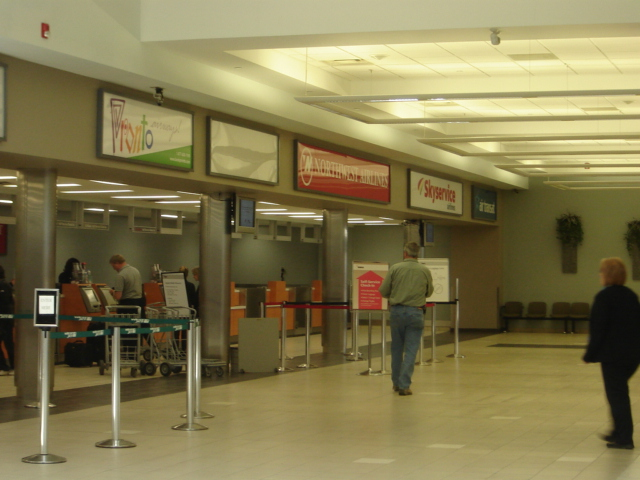
Check-in for Pronto, Skyservice, Sunwing, Northwest, and Air Transat in 2008

On June 1, 1929, the city of Saskatoon was given a "Licence For Air Harbour" and the airport was established. This provided a home for the Saskatoon Aero Club.

From 1940 to 1947, the city leased the airport to the Royal Canadian Air Force (RCAF). The airport became RCAF Station Saskatoon. The station was a part of the British Commonwealth Air Training Plan, and the station was home to No. 4 Service Flight Training School. To support these operations, four large hangars were built, as well as support buildings, which included a hospital and control tower.

After the war (1947) the airport was transferred to the Canadian Department of Transport for civilian use. The same year,Trans-Canada Air Lines, now known as Air Canada, started to provide passenger service using Douglas DC-3 aircraft.

Air Canada in 1950 began operating the Canadair North Star at the airport, followed by the Vickers Viscount in 1955. A new terminal building was also constructed in 1955 by Transport Department architects.

The primary runway (09/27) was lengthened in 1954 and again in 1960 to 8,300 ft (2,530 m). The secondary runway (15/33) was lengthened in 1963 to 6,200 ft (1,890 m).

From 1950 to 1978 the Airport was again made a station of the RCAF. The station was named RCAF Station Saskatoon.

On January 1, 1971, the City of Saskatoon annexed the airport and surrounding lands totalling 2,111.7 acres. The nearby area, which contained personnel housing and support services, was annexed by the city in 1965.

In 1972, due to larger aircraft and more frequent flights, plans were drafted for a new terminal building. The new terminal built by Holiday and Scott was completed and opened on November 29, 1975. The former terminal was renovated in 1977. From 1977 to 1984, Boeing 747 charter flights were operated by now-defunct Wardair to Europe until Wardair was bought by Canadian Airlines International.

In 1993 the name of the airport was changed to recognize Canada's 13th Prime Minister, John Diefenbaker. In 1995, under the Canada-US Open Skies agreement, Northwest Airlines started service to Minneapolis – Saint Paul. In 1996, WestJet began Boeing 737 service. In 1999, the airport was turned over to the Saskatoon Airport Authority, as part of the National Airports Policy.

In 2000, Nav Canada constructed a new control tower and the airport authority began renovations and expansions to the terminal building. In October 2002, the first two phases of renovations to the air terminal building were completed at a cost of $18 million, designed by Kindrachuk Agrey Architects. The updated terminal facilities were designed to handle 1.4 million passengers annually. In 2005, additional renovations were completed to the check-in area and baggage screening, as well as the addition of a fifth bridge. In 2006, the airport expanded public parking to 500 stalls. In March 2008, work started on the rehabilitation of runway 09/27, taxiway Foxtrot and Alpha at a cost of $16 million.

Between October 2005 and May 2008, Air Canada ended "mainline" service into Saskatoon, turning over routes to Air Canada Jazz. In 2006, Pronto Airways started operating at the airport. In 2006 Transwest Air introduced service to Fort McMurray, Alberta. For a short period of time between 2006 and April 2007, Northwestern Air also operated flights to Fort McMurray. In 2008, United Airlines began non-stop regional service from Denver that operated until 2015. In 2009, United Airlines announced regional service from Chicago that operated until 2014.

In March 2015, Missinippi Airways began thrice-weekly service to Saskatoon direct to Flin Flon, Manitoba, with a one-stop connection to The Pas, Manitoba, though this ceased three months later. In June, 2016, New Leaf Airlines announced they would begin flying to Kelowna and Hamilton direct from Saskatoon twice weekly beginning July 27, 2016, but this lasted just four months before in November of that year.

== 2009-2015 Renovation and Expansions ==
In 2009, a new expansion was announced for the terminal. The plan included nine bridgeable gates and a food court, including a full-service restaurant and bar (post-security). Also included in the plan was more retail, including a duty-free outlet, and another food court before the security area. The new design moved security for more room for retail, but also planned to double the size of the security area. The check-in area was not included in the expansion. A new Canadian Customs and Immigration area was added, as well as two additional baggage carousels. The designers also left space that was meant for an American Pre-Customs and Immigration area, with the intention of authorizing U.S. Pre-Clearance area for the airport in the future.

In 2010, construction started on apron improvements, remote stands, and preparation to start the reconstruction of the terminal building in 2011. The expansion was designed to accommodate eight bridges, expand passenger waiting areas, add a business/first class lounge, and expand baggage claim area.

Phase 1 of the expansion began in 2012. The expansion nearly doubled the size of the air terminal building to 226,670 sq ft (21,058 m^{2}). The Phase 1 terminal expansion was completed in 2013, and, in October of that year, the airport welcomed its first arriving and departing passengers into the expanded terminal. Construction of the terminal was completed in April 2015. The overall cost of the project was $53 million.

In February 2016, the airport issued request for proposals for Air Terminal Building Groundside Departures Hall Expansion, West Aero Park Development, and Saskatoon International Airport rebranding. The airport issued additional request for proposals for Shuttle Parking Lot Development and Apron III and V Pavement Rehabilitation.

== Passenger services ==
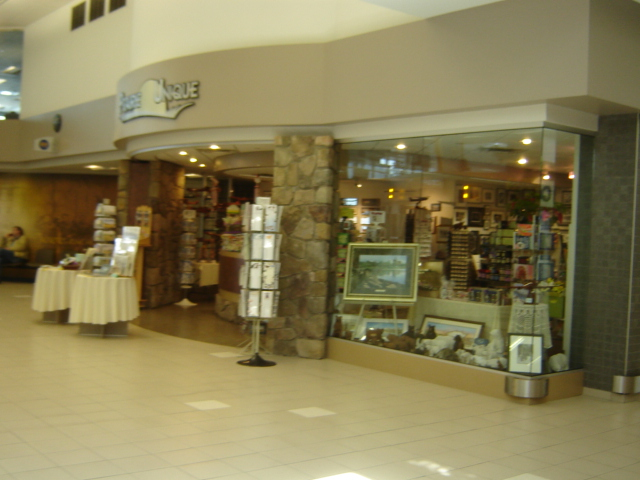
Prairie Unique Gifts

The airport contains a small historical display on the main floor. There are also numerous art/photography displays by local artists around the terminal. There are a full restaurant, a Tim Hortons and a Starbucks in the post-security area, and a Relay store near the entrances.

In February 2015, St. John Ambulance introduced therapy dogs to the airport, providing a service to put nervous passengers at ease.

== Ground transportation ==
Saskatoon Transit Route 11 provides city bus service between the airport and the downtown core. Several car rental agencies and taxicab services are available from the airport.

== Other services ==
The airport has a variety of additional buildings, including the International Aviation Terminal (used by Air Canada Cargo, Anderson Aviation, Dryden Air-services). Twenty-three former Air Canada Jazz and Canadian Regional Airlines Fokker F28 aircraft have been stored at the airport since they were retired from the fleet in 2003.

The Saskatchewan Air Ambulance provides fixed wing air ambulance services, and has its headquarters and main base at the airport. There is a hangar for a Shock Trauma Air Rescue Society helicopter out of the Saskatoon airport.

== Airlines and destinations ==
=== Passenger ===
Airlines	Destinations
Air Canada	Toronto–Pearson, Vancouver
Air Canada Express	Vancouver; Seasonal: Montréal–Trudeau, Regina
Porter Airlines	Toronto–Pearson
Rise Air	Fond-du-Lac, La Ronge, Points North, Prince Albert, Stony Rapids, Uranium City, Wollaston
WestJet	Calgary, Minneapolis/St. Paul, Toronto–Pearson, Vancouver; Seasonal: Cancún, Halifax, Phoenix–Sky Harbor, Puerto Vallarta
WestJet Encore	Calgary, Edmonton, Winnipeg; Seasonal: Kelowna; Charter: Fort MacKay

=== Cargo ===
Airlines	Destinations
Cargojet Airways	Regina, Winnipeg
SkyLink Express	Regina, Winnipeg

== Statistics ==
=== Annual traffic ===
Annual passenger traffic
Year	Passengers	% Change
2010	1,215,923	▲5.1%
2011	1,246,405	▲2.5%
2012	1,326,838	▲6.4%
2013	1,389,875	▲4.7%
2014	1,482,615	▲6.6%
2015	1,443,446	▼ -2.6%
2016	1,452,349	▲0.6%
2017	1,462,751	▲0.7%
2018	1,518,980	▲3.7%
2019	1,488,810	▼1.9%
2020	462,580	▼68.9%
2021	439,927	▼1.6%
2022	952,051	▲116.2%
2023	1,277,863	▲34.2%
2024	1,469,224	▲14.9%
2025	1,516,840	▲3.2%

== Facilities ==
Saskatoon John G. Diefenbaker Regional Airport Fire Department operates two crash tenders (Oshkosh Striker 3000) in a renovated (2008) fire station to provide fire and rescue services at the airport.

GardaWorld Security is contracted by the Canadian Air Transport Security Authority to provide security screening for passengers, non-passengers, and baggage screening. All Screening Officers wear CATSA uniforms. These are not Government of Canada employees, but rather are employed by the contractor.

== Accidents and incidents ==
On April 1, 2011, a Fugro Aviation Canada Limited CASA C-212, C-FDKM, carrying three crew, crashed while attempting a landing at Saskatoon Airport. After declaring an emergency with an engine failure, the aircraft crashed on a Saskatoon street (Wanuskewin Drive) and hit a concrete sound barrier. One person was killed, and two were injured.

== See also ==
- Saskatoon/Banga International Air Aerodrome
- List of airports in Saskatchewan
