= Points North Landing Airport =

Airport in Saskatchewan, Canada

- IATA: YNL; ICAO: CYNL

Summary
- Airport type: Public
- Operator: Points North Freight Forwarding Inc.
- Location: Points North Landing, Saskatchewan
- Time zone: CST (UTC−06:00)
- Elevation AMSL: 1,600 ft / 488 m
- Coordinates: 58°16′36″N 104°04′57″W
- Website: http://www.pointsnorthgroup.ca/

Map
- Location in Saskatchewan CYNL (Canada)

Runways
Direction	Length		Surface
Direction	ft	m	Surface
16/34	5,848	1,782	Gravel
- Source: Canada Flight Supplement

Points North Landing Airport (IATA: YNL, ICAO: CYNL) is a regional airport adjacent to Points North Landing in Saskatchewan, Canada.

== Airlines and destinations ==
=== Passenger ===
Airlines	Destinations
Rise Air	La Ronge, Prince Albert, Saskatoon

== See also ==
- List of airports in Saskatchewan
- Points North Landing Water Aerodrome
