= Stony Rapids Airport =

Airport in Saskatchewan, Canada

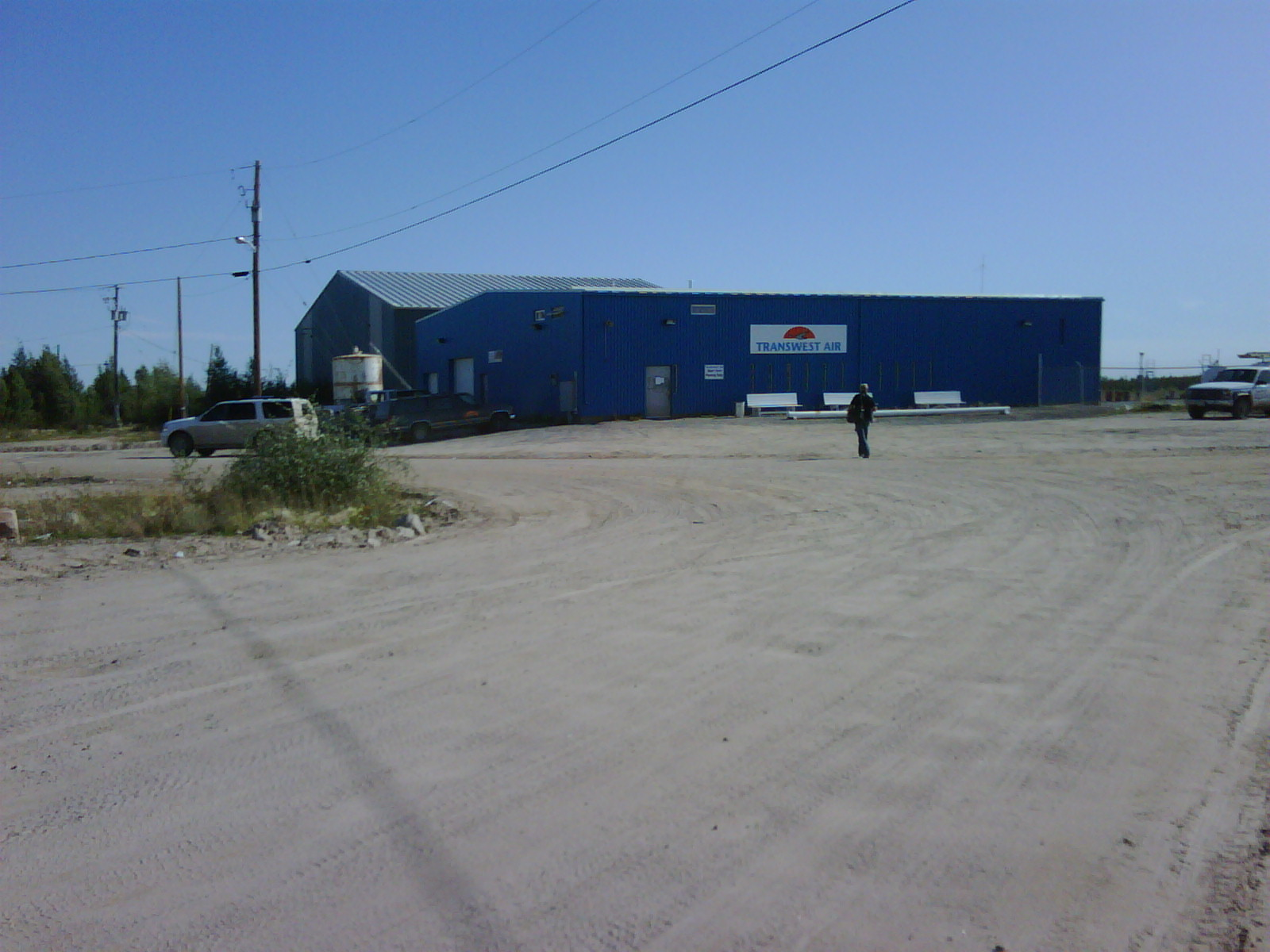
- IATA: YSF; ICAO: CYSF; WMO: 71132

Summary
- Airport type: Public
- Operator: Ministry of Highways & Infrastructure
- Location: Stony Rapids, Saskatchewan
- Time zone: CST (UTC−06:00)
- Elevation AMSL: 801 ft (244 m)
- Coordinates: 59°15′01″N 105°50′29″W

Map
- Location in Saskatchewan CYSF (Canada)

Runways
Direction	Length		Surface
Direction	ft	m	Surface
06/24	5,052	1,540	Paved - TBS

Statistics (2010)
- Aircraft movements: 10,808
- Source: Canada Flight Supplement; Environment Canada; Movements from Statistics Canada.

Stony Rapids Airport (IATA: YSF, ICAO: CYSF) is located adjacent to Stony Rapids, Saskatchewan, Canada.

On June 25, 2006, the airport was used to evacuate residents from northern Saskatchewan when Stony Rapids and other nearby communities were threatened by forest fires.

== Airlines and destinations ==
=== Passenger ===
Airlines	Destinations
Rise Air	Fond-du-Lac, Prince Albert, Saskatoon, Uranium City

== Weather information ==
- Automated Weather Observation System (AWOS)
- Aviation Weather Cameras (WxCam)

== See also ==
- List of airports in Saskatchewan
- Stony Rapids Water Aerodrome
