= Uranium City Airport =

Airport in Saskatchewan, Canada

- IATA: YBE; ICAO: CYBE

Summary
- Airport type: Public
- Operator: Ministry of Highways & Infrastructure
- Location: Uranium City, Saskatchewan
- Time zone: CST (UTC−06:00)
- Elevation AMSL: 1,025 ft / 312 m
- Coordinates: 59°33′41″N 108°28′53″W

Map
- Location in Saskatchewan CYBE (Canada)

Runways
Direction	Length		Surface
Direction	ft	m	Surface
06/24	3,935	1,199	Paved - TBS
- Source: Canada Flight Supplement

Uranium City Airport (IATA: YBE, ICAO: CYBE) is located 4 nautical miles (7.4 km; 4.6 mi) east of Uranium City, Saskatchewan, Canada. It is classified as a Code 2 airport.

The airport was built by Eldorado Mining and Refining Limited in the 1950s to support the growing mining operations around Uranium City. Transport Canada assumed ownership in the 1970s.

After the loss of the community's mining industry, Uranium City began a sharp depopulation. The Saskatchewan provincial government assumed ownership of the airport in early 1997 from Transport Canada. The facility was downgraded two years later as its runway was shortened from 5,000 ft (1,500 m) to 3,930 ft (1,200 m), while the runway's width was halved to 100 ft (30 m).

== Airlines and destinations ==
=== Passenger ===
Airlines	Destinations
Rise Air	Fond-du-Lac, Prince Albert, Saskatoon, Stony Rapids

== See also ==
- List of airports in Saskatchewan
- Uranium City Water Aerodrome
