= Hatchet Lake Denesuline First Nation =

Indian reserve in Saskatchewan, Canada

- Band No. 352
- Tthęł Tué Dene
- People: Denesuline
- Treaty: Treaty 10
- Headquarters: Wollaston Lake
- Province: Saskatchewan

Land
- Other reserve: Lac la Hache 220
- Land area: 110.2 km^{2} (42.5 sq mi)

Population (2021)
- On reserve: 1450
- Off reserve: 463
- Total population: 1913

Government
- Chief: Bartholomew Tsannie

Tribal Council
- Prince Albert Grand Council

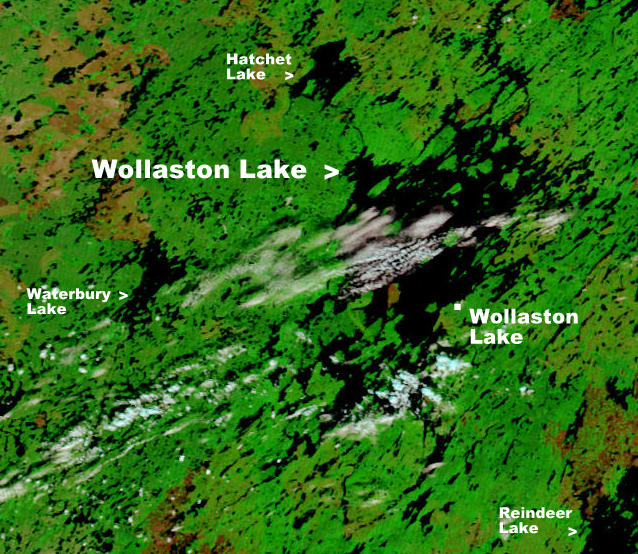
Wollaston Lake in Saskatchewan

Location of Wollaston Lake in Saskatchewan

Hatchet Lake Denesuline Nation (Chipewyan: Tthęł Tué Dene) is a Denesuline First Nation in northern Saskatchewan. The main settlement, Wollaston Lake, is an unincorporated community on Wollaston Lake in the boreal forest of north-eastern Saskatchewan, Canada.

The population centre comprises the northern settlement of Wollaston Lake, an unincorporated community in the Northern Saskatchewan Administration District, and the adjoining First Nations community of Wollaston Post, the administrative headquarters of the Hatchet Lake Dene First Nation band government.

Access is provided by Wollaston Lake Airport and Highway 905. With the highway on the west side of the lake and the community on the east, access from the highway is provided by an ice road in the winter and by the Wollaston Barge Ferry in the summer. Highway 995 services the community and runs from the airport to the barge.

== Demographics ==
In the 2021 Census of Population conducted by Statistics Canada, the Northern Settlement of Wollaston Lake had a population of 96 living in 30 of its 39 total private dwellings, a change of −7.7% from its 2016 population of 104. With a land area of 1.45 km^{2} (0.56 sq mi), it had a population density of 66.2/km^{2} (171.5/sq mi) in 2021. The population of Wollaston Post (Lac La Hache 220, IR, Saskatchewan) was 1,251 in 2011.

Canada census – Hatchet Lake Denesuline First Nation community profile

	2011
Population	1,251 (+26.6% from 2006)
Land area	110.87 km^{2} (42.81 sq mi)
Population density	11.3/km^{2} (29/sq mi)
Median age	20.1 (M: 20.9, F: 19.9)
Private dwellings	244 (total)
Median household income

References: 2011

== Band government ==
Wollaston Post is the administrative centre of the Hatchet Lake Dene Nation. The First Nations band government had a total registered membership of 1,760 in January 2015 with 1,369 members residing on-reserve and 391 members residing at locations off-reserve. Under a Custom Electoral System members choose one Chief and six councillors. Hatchet Lake is affiliated with the Prince Albert Grand Council.

=== Territory ===
Hatchet Lake Dene Nation has one territory (Lac La Hache 220). Lac La Hache 220 is 11,020 hectares (27,200 acres) 58.1957°N 103.0225°W. It includes many islands the largest being Strong Island, Paul Island, Labby Island and Jackpine Island and peninsulas north of the settlement in the area surrounding Fidler Bay and Kempton Bay.

== Climate ==
Wollaston Lake has a subarctic climate (Dfc) with mild, wet summers and long, severely cold winters.

Climate data for Wollaston Lake
Month	Jan	Feb	Mar	Apr	May	Jun	Jul	Aug	Sep	Oct	Nov	Dec	Year
Mean daily maximum °C (°F)	−20.0 (−4.0)	−15.5 (4.1)	−8.1 (17.4)	2.8 (37.0)	10.8 (51.4)	17.2 (63.0)	20.5 (68.9)	18.5 (65.3)	10.9 (51.6)	3.0 (37.4)	−9.1 (15.6)	−17.8 (0.0)	1.1 (34.0)
Daily mean °C (°F)	−24.5 (−12.1)	−20.5 (−4.9)	−14.1 (6.6)	−3.0 (26.6)	5.3 (41.5)	11.7 (53.1)	15.4 (59.7)	13.5 (56.3)	6.8 (44.2)	−0.4 (31.3)	−12.7 (9.1)	−21.9 (−7.4)	−3.7 (25.3)
Mean daily minimum °C (°F)	−29.0 (−20.2)	−25.5 (−13.9)	−20.1 (−4.2)	−8.7 (16.3)	−0.1 (31.8)	6.2 (43.2)	10.3 (50.5)	8.6 (47.5)	2.8 (37.0)	−3.7 (25.3)	−16.3 (2.7)	−25.9 (−14.6)	−8.5 (16.8)
Average precipitation mm (inches)	22 (0.9)	17 (0.7)	25 (1.0)	29 (1.1)	41 (1.6)	64 (2.5)	89 (3.5)	68 (2.7)	60 (2.4)	43 (1.7)	32 (1.3)	24 (0.9)	514 (20.3)
Source: http://en.climate-data.org/location/107968/

== See also ==
- Denesuline language
- Denesuline
