= Turnor =

Turnor may refer to:

== People ==
- Algernon Turnor (1845–1921), British civil servant
- Christopher Turnor (judge) (1607–1675), English judge in the time of Charles II
- Christopher Turnor (MP) (1809–1886), English Member of Parliament for South Lincolnshire
- Christopher Hatton Turnor (1873–1940), English architect and social reformer
- Edmund Turnor (Lincolnshire MP) (1838–1903), English Conservative Party politician
- Edmund Turnor (antiquarian) (1755–1829), English antiquarian, author, landowner and politician
- Edward Turnor (1617–1676), Speaker of the House of Commons of England
- Philip Turnor (c. 1751 – c. 1799), Canadian surveyor
- William Turnor Lewis (1840–1915), American businessman

== Other uses ==
- Turnor Lake, community in Canada
- Turnor Lake (Saskatchewan), lake in Canada
- Turnor Lake 194, Indian reserve in Canada
- Turnor Lake 193B, Indian reserve in Canada
