= Birch Narrows Dene Nation =

Canadian First Nation band government

- Band No. 403
- People: Dene
- Treaty: Treaty 10
- Headquarters: Turnor Lake
- Province: Saskatchewan

Land
- Main reserve: Turnor Lake 194
- Reserves: Churchill Lake 193A; Turnor Lake 193B
- Land area: 29.024 km^{2} (11.206 sq mi)

Population (2021)
- On reserve: 440
- On other land: 42
- Off reserve: 374
- Total population: 856

Government
- Chief: Jonathon Sylvestre
- Council: Kim Sylvestre; Jonathan Sylvestre; Ann Sylvester; Dorothy Sylvester

Tribal Council
- Meadow Lake Tribal Council

Website
- http://birchnarrowsdenenation.ca/

Birch Narrows Dene Nation (Chipewyan: K'ı́t'ádhı̨ká) is a Dene First Nation band government in the boreal forest region of northern Saskatchewan, Canada. It is affiliated with the Meadow Lake Tribal Council (MLTC).

== Demographics ==
In 1972, Turnor Lake First Nation (Birch Narrows' predecessor) had a population of 150.

In 2011, Birch Narrows Dene Nation had a population of 680.

As of June 2012 Birch Narrows Dene Nation had a total population of 708, with 409 members living on reserve and 299 members living at locations off reserve.

The Nation had a population of roughly 700 in 2016, with 350 on reserve and 350 off reserve.

As of January 2021, the Nation had 440 members on reserve and a total of 416 living off reserve or on other land.

== Territory ==
Birch Narrows Dene Nation has territory at three sites.

- Turnor Lake 193 B with 296.70 hectares 56.4726°N 108.6869°W adjoins the village of Turnor Lake, Saskatchewan.
- Churchill Lake 193 A with 159.80 hectares contains the historic site of Clear Lake 56.1408°N 108.2072°W at the junction of Churchill Lake and Frobisher Lake.
- Turnor Lake 194 with 2445.90 hectares 55.9353°N 108.8450°W is on Peter Pond Lake east of Dillon.

== History ==
Birch Narrows is a signatory to Treaty 10, chief Raphael Redshildkze and 45 members having signed the treaty with the Crown on August 28, 1906 as a means of preserving their traditional way of life in the face of encroaching settlers and mineral exploration. This established the Clear Lake Band. On September 17, 1906, 110 members from Clear Lake signed onto the treaty, bringing the Band to 159 total members. In 1965, most members of the Clear Lake Band relocated to Turnor Lake, English River (near the current location of Patuanak), and Buffalo River (near the current location of Dillon). In 1968, a highway to La Loche and a school opened at Turnor Lake. By 1971, it was a K-8 school with four teachers.

In 1972, the community at Turnor Lake had a population of 150 and was recognised by the federal government as Turnor Lake Band. In 1976, they enacted their own Election Act, with their government including one chief and four councillors (under the Indian Act, there had only been two). The first Administration office for the band government was built in 1977. In 1986, the Meadow Lake Tribal Council was created from the Meadow Lake District Chiefs. In 1990 the Turnor Lake Band changed their name to Birch Narrows Dene Nation.

From 2003 to 2010, a new Band Office was built, an agreement was signed with an RCMP detachment, a water treatment plant and the Birch Narrows Denesuline Arena were built and opened, and a new housing sub-division was completed. In 2010, the nation's governing body became known as Birch Narrows Dene Development Inc., operating with one chief and four councillors as before, under Band Custom Election policies with four year terms. In 2013 a new bridge was built near the community. In 2015 a fish plant was opened.

=== List of chiefs since signing of Treaty 10 ===
Below is a list of chiefs of Birch Narrows Dene Nation (and its predecessors) since 1906:

Dates	Name of First Nation	Chief
1906-1911	Clear Lake Band	Raphael Redshildkze
1911-1937	Clear Lake Band	Peirre Nezcroche
1937-1940	Peter Pond Lake Band	Raphael Campbell
1940-1972	Peter Pond Lake Band	Alexander Campbell
1972-1973	Peter Pond Lake Band	Joe Oneeye
1972-1973	Turnor Lake Band	Joe Oneeye
1973-1978	Turnor Lake Band	Lambert Sylvester
1978-1984	Turnor Lake Band	Leon Cataract
1984-1988	Turnor Lake Band	Paul Sylvester
1988-1990	Turnor Lake Band	Eric Sylvester
1990-1994	Turnor Lake Band	Jean Campbell
1995-1998	Turnor Lake Band	Wanda Cataract
1998-2014	Birch Narrows Dene Nation	Robert Sylvester
2014–present	Birch Narrows Dene Nation	Jonathan Sylvester

== Dispute with Baselode Energy ==
On February 9, 2021, members of the First Nation issued a cease and desist order to James Sykes, CEO of Baselode Energy Corporation, a Toronto-based uranium company who had been conducting mineral exploration on unoccupied Crown land near the band's territory without their consent. On February 10, Baselode workers were seen on the territory again, and members set up a checkpoint, blockading access and monitoring the area, which included a trapline owned by Leonard Sylvester that the workers were using to access the forest. By February 21, the blockade had been removed, but members of the nation were patrolling the area regularly. Opponents to Baselode continuing operations in the area cite concerns over the threatened woodland caribou population, among other environmental concerns. The chair of Baselode's board, Stephen Stewart, said that operations would not continue without the First Nation's consent. Stewart said he was surprised at the response, that they had been communicating with Birch Narrows and other nearby communities, and that they had all the required permits. However, he acknowledged the importance of Indigenous rights, and was confident his company would be able to regain the First Nation's trust. Wayne Semaganis, Chief of Little Pine First Nation, offered support to Birch Narrows against the lack of consultation by Baselode, claiming that the consultation rules set by the provincial government were unrealistic, and that First Nations needed to be treated like partners by industry and government. The dispute with Baselode also led to calls from leaders of the Meadow Lake Tribal Council and the Federation of Sovereign Indigenous Nations for the Government of Saskatchewan to bring its policies in line with the United Nations Declaration on the Rights of Indigenous Peoples. Baselode CEO James Sykes said there have been mischaracterizations of the circumstances that the company deems to be inaccurate. In a letter to the Prince Albert Daily Herald, Baselode said it is a “highly respected publicly traded exploration company” that has “built a reputation for going above and beyond in its interactions with indigenous people.” Saskatchewan Minister of Environment Warren Kaeding met with the Birch Narrows Dene Nation and the Federation of Sovereign Indigenous Nations to discuss the situation.

== See also ==
- Denesuline language
- Denesuline
