= Bear Creek, Saskatchewan =

Northern settlement in Saskatchewan, Canada

Coordinates: 56°17′54″N 108°56′15″W

Location of Bear Creek in Saskatchewan

Bear Creek is a northern settlement in northwest Saskatchewan located on Highway 155. This community of 47 people is midway between the towns of Buffalo Narrows to the south and La Loche to the north. It is near the junction of Highway 909 that leads to Turnor Lake to the east. The chairman of this northern settlement is Dean Herman. The northern settlement is an unincorporated community in the Northern Saskatchewan Administration District.

The community is located on Bear Creek which flows south from Linvall Lake and Palmbere Lake to Peter Pond Lake.

Another Bear Creek was once located in the Qu'Appelle District of southern Saskatchewan. It had a post office which opened on June 10, 1935 and closed on June 15, 1963.

== History ==
After Highway 155 was built in the 1960s several families from La Loche built homes there.

== Demographics ==
In the 2021 Census of Population conducted by Statistics Canada, Bear Creek had a population of 45 living in 12 of its 13 total private dwellings, a change of 36.4% from its 2016 population of 33. With a land area of 1.95 km^{2} (0.75 sq mi), it had a population density of 23.1/km^{2} (59.8/sq mi) in 2021.

== See also ==
- List of communities in Northern Saskatchewan
- List of communities in Saskatchewan
