= Wasekamio Lake =

Lake in Saskatchewan, Canada

- Location in Saskatchewan Wasekamio Lake (Canada)
- Location: Northern Administration District, Saskatchewan
- Coordinates: 56.7500°N 108.7818°W
- Lake type: Glacial lake
- Part of: Churchill River drainage basin
- Primary inflows: McGrath Creek
- Primary outflows: a channel to Turnor Lake
- Basin countries: Canada
- Surface elevation: 419 m (1,375 ft)
- Islands: Sebestyen Island; Hill Island
- Settlements: None

Wasekamio Lake is a glacial lake in northern part of the Canadian province of Saskatchewan. It is part of a series of connected lakes that flow south into the Churchill River drainage system. These lakes from north to south are Wasekamio Lake, Turnor Lake, Frobisher Lake, and Churchill Lake. Just north of Wasekamio Lake is the Clearwater River that flows west to the Athabasca River.

== Fish species ==
The lake's fish species include: walleye, sauger, yellow perch, northern pike, lake trout, lake whitefish, cisco, white sucker, longnose sucker, and burbot.

== See also ==
- List of lakes of Saskatchewan
