= Dillon River =

Dillon River may refer to:

- Dillon River (Canada)
- Dillon River (New Zealand)
