= Turnor Lake =

Community in Saskatchewan, Canada

Location of Turnor Lake in Saskatchewan

Turnor Lake (Woods Cree: ᒥᓂᐢᑎᑯ ᓵᑲᐦᐃᑲᓂᕽ, romanized: ministiko-sâkahikanihk) is a community on the southern shore of Turnor Lake in the Canadian province of Saskatchewan. From Highway 155 it is accessible by Highway 909. The community includes the Northern Hamlet of Turnor Lake and Turnor Lake 193B of the Birch Narrows First Nation.

The combined population was 598 in the 2011 Canada Census. Turnor Lake had 179 people and Birch Narrows (Turnor Lake 193B) had 419 people.

== History ==
The lake was once called Island Lake (Lac des Isles). In 1895, Birch Narrows had five families or 25 people in residence. Father Penard of La Loche mentions in his letter of 1911 that there were six or seven families living at "le Detroit du Bouleau" (Birch Narrows) 35 miles east of La Loche.

In 1938, Father Ducharme had a chapel built in the community.

In 1966, the people of Clear Lake were relocated to Turnor Lake. (Clear Lake had about 60 people in 1944 according to the Piercy Report.)

== Demographics ==
In the 2021 Census of Population conducted by Statistics Canada, Turnor Lake had a population of 154 living in 44 of its 60 total private dwellings, a change of 3.4% from its 2016 population of 149. With a land area of 5.07 km^{2} (1.96 sq mi), it had a population density of 30.4/km^{2} (78.7/sq mi) in 2021.

== Birch Narrows Dene Nation ==
As of June 2012, Birch Narrows Dene Nation had 409 members living on reserve and 299 members living at locations off reserve. It is affiliated with the Meadow Lake Tribal Council (MLTC).

Birch Narrows Dene Nation has territory at three sites:

- Turnor Lake 193B with 296.7 hectares (733 acres) 56.4726°N 108.6869°W, which adjoins the Northern Hamlet of Turnor Lake;
- Churchill Lake 193A with 159.8 hectares (395 acres), which contains the historic site of Clear Lake 56.1408°N 108.2072°W at the junction of Churchill Lake and Frobisher Lake; and
- Turnor Lake 194 with 2,445.9 hectares (6,044 acres) 55.9353°N 108.8450°W, which is on Peter Pond Lake east of Dillon.

== See also ==
- List of communities in Saskatchewan
- Denesuline
