= Edmund Turnor =

Edmund Turnor may refer to:

- Edmund Turnor (Lincolnshire MP) (1838–1903), English Conservative Party politician
- Edmund Turnor (antiquarian) (1755–1829), English antiquarian, author, landowner and politician
