= Black Point, Saskatchewan =

Community in Saskatchewan, Canada

Coordinates: 56°22′03″N 109°26′58″W

Location of Black Point in Saskatchewan

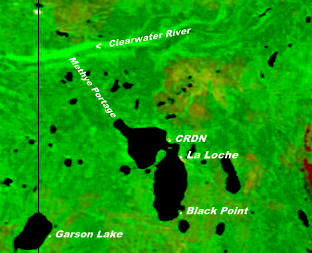
NASA image of Lac La Loche showing Black Point

Black Point is a northern hamlet in Saskatchewan situated on the southern shore of Lac La Loche close to the northern village of La Loche. It is accessible from Highway 956, which is off Highway 155.

The population of Black Point is 47 and is led by mayor Annette Petit. The northern settlement is an unincorporated community in the Northern Saskatchewan Administration District.

== Demographics ==
In the 2021 Census of Population conducted by Statistics Canada, Black Point had a population of 39 living in 15 of its 27 total private dwellings, a change of -9.3% from its 2016 population of 43. With a land area of 0.69 km^{2} (0.27 sq mi), it had a population density of 56.5/km^{2} (146.4/sq mi) in 2021.

== See also ==
- List of communities in Saskatchewan
