= Northland College =

Northland College may refer to:

- Northland College, Kaikohe, New Zealand
- Northland College (Wisconsin) in Ashland, Wisconsin, U.S.
- Northland Scholars Academy, formerly Northland International University, Northland Baptist Bible College and other names, in Dunbar, Wisconsin, U.S.
- Northland Community & Technical College in Minnesota, U.S.

== See also ==
- Northlands College, in Saskatchewan, Canada
