= Turnor Lake (Saskatchewan) =

Lake in Saskatchewan, Canada

- Location in Saskatchewan Turnor Lake (Canada)
- Location: Northern Administration District, Saskatchewan
- Coordinates: 56.4728°N 108.7061°W
- Lake type: Glacial lake
- Part of: Churchill River drainage basin
- Primary inflows: Wasekamio Lake, McDonald Creek
- Primary outflows: Wanasin River to Frobisher Lake
- Catchment area: Churchill River
- Basin countries: Canada
- Surface elevation: 421 m (1,381 ft)
- Islands: Miniwatin Island; Mikisi Island
- Settlements: Turnor Lake

Turnor Lake is a lake in northern Saskatchewan, Canada. It is part of a series of connected lakes that flow into the Churchill River drainage system. These lakes from north to south are Wasekamio Lake, Turnor Lake, Frobisher Lake and Churchill Lake. The community of Turnor Lake which includes the Birch Narrows Dene Nation is located on the southern shore of Turnor Lake. It is accessed by Highway 909 off of Highway 155

== Fish species ==
The lake's fish species include: walleye, sauger, yellow perch, northern pike, lake trout, lake whitefish, cisco, white sucker, longnose sucker, and burbot.

== See also ==
- List of lakes of Saskatchewan
