= Kisis Channel =

Strait in Saskatchewan, Canada

Kisis Channel Buffalo Narrows channel
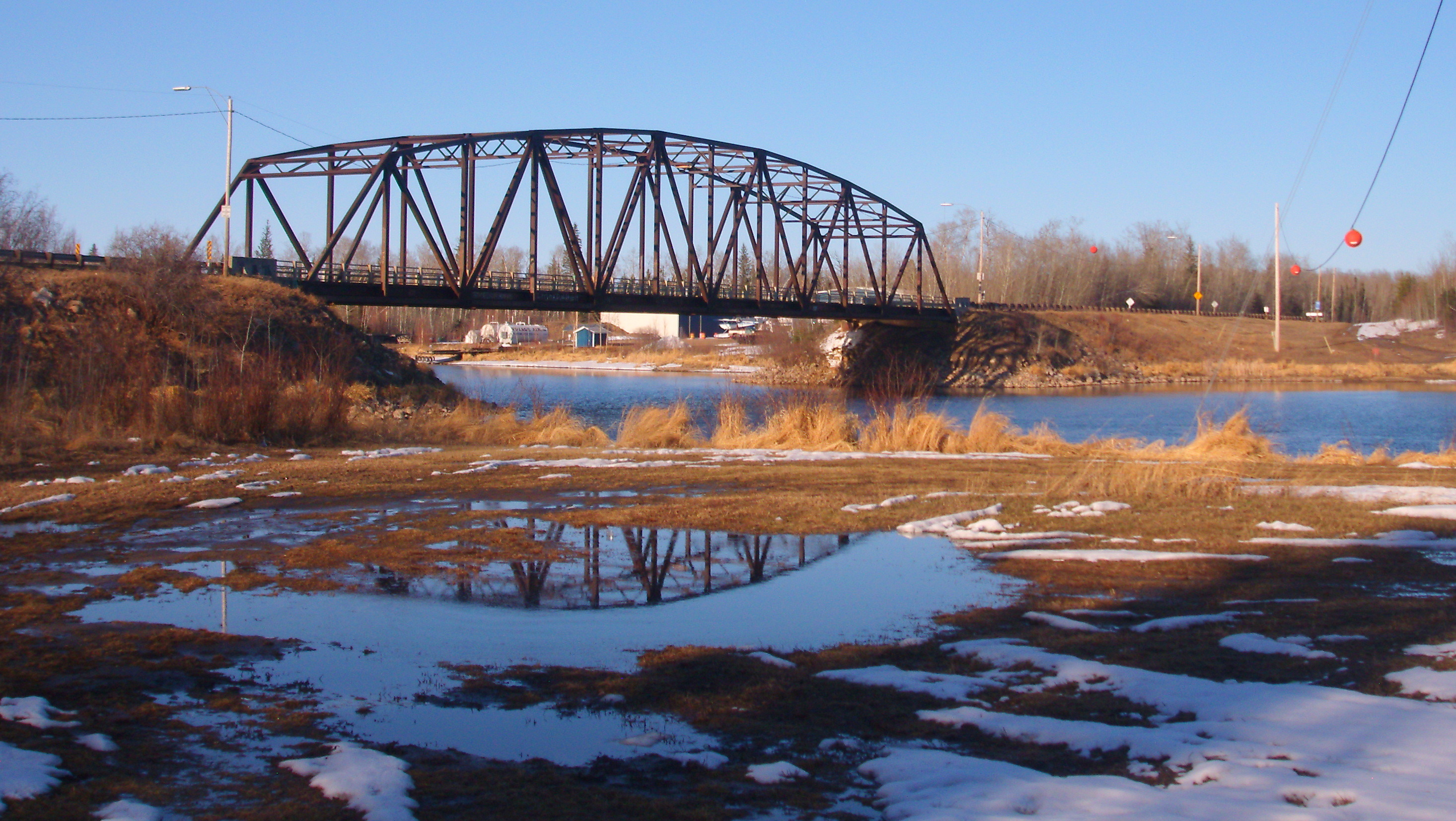
- Buffalo Narrows Bridge crossing Kisis Channel

- Location of channel in Saskatchewan Kisis Channel (Canada)
- Nickname: The Narrows

Location
- Country: Canada
- Province: Saskatchewan

Physical characteristics
- Source: Peter Pond Lake
  - location: Buffalo Narrows
  - coordinates: 55.8321°N 108.4634°W
  - elevation: 421 km (262 mi)
- Mouth: Churchill Lake
  - location: Buffalo Narrows
  - coordinates: 55.8549°N 108.4725°W
  - elevation: 421 km (262 mi)
- Length: 2.8 km (1.7 mi)

Basin features
- River system: Churchill River

Kisis Channel, also known as Buffalo Narrows channel and the Narrows, is a strait in the Canadian province of Saskatchewan that connects Peter Pond Lake to Churchill Lake in the Churchill River drainage basin. The channel is in the Boreal Shield Ecozone with a surrounding landscape of boreal forest. The channel was used by Indigenous hunters as a bottleneck when hunting wood buffalo and was an important point on early fur trade and exploration routes. It runs through the community of Buffalo Narrows and is crossed by Highway 155.

== History ==
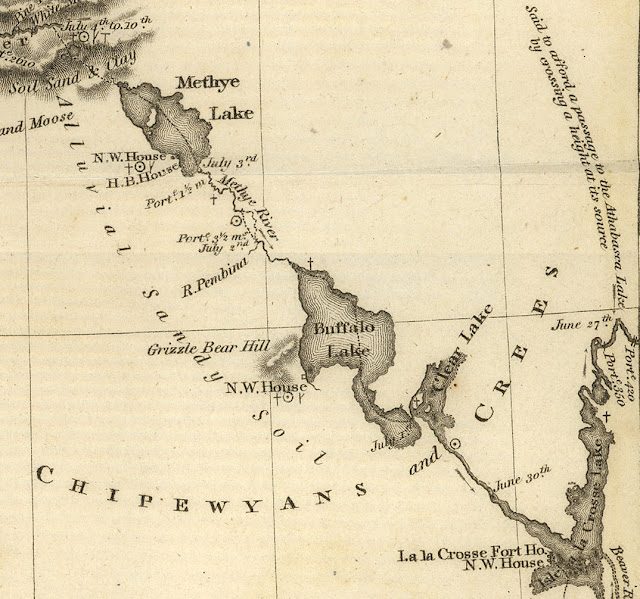
John Franklin's 1819–1820 map with the location of Kisis Channel marked as "July 1st" between Clear Lake (now Churchill Lake) and Buffalo Lake (now Peter Pond Lake)

The Kisis Channel connects Peter Pond and Churchill Lakes. Churchill Lake is the source of the Churchill River. On either side of the channel, narrowing peninsulas extend towards the channel. Indigenous hunters used this narrowing of the land when hunting wood buffalo to create a bottleneck, essentially corralling the buffalo.

Beginning in the 1790s, fur trading posts were set up in the area as the channel was along an important fur trading route from the Hudson Bay to the Methye Portage. The Methye Portage connected the Hudson Bay drainage basin to the Arctic basins.

Early notable explorers, including Peter Pond and John Franklin, traversed the narrows during their expeditions. Franklin mapped the area in his first expedition (1819–1820) marking his crossing of the narrows on "July 1st".

== Highway access ==
In the summer of 1957, Buffalo Narrows Road was completed to the south side of Kisis Channel from Green Lake providing a road link to the rest of the province. A year-round ferry service was established for vehicles to cross the channel to Buffalo Narrows. The channel was able to remain ice-free due to a high pressure aeration system built at the bottom of the channel that forced warm water up. Buffalo Narrows Road was designated as provincial Highway 155 in August 1963. Buffalo Narrows Bridge built was built in 1980 replacing the ferry service.

== See also ==
- Hudson Bay drainage basin
- North American fur trade
