= La Loche River =

La Loche River may refer to:

- La Loche River (Saskatchewan)
- La Loche River (Ashuapmushuan River), Quebec
