= Little Amyot Lake =

Community in Saskatchewan, Canada

Coordinates: 55.110°N 107.500°W

Location of Little Amyot Lake in Saskatchewan

Little Amyot Lake is a hamlet in the Canadian province of Saskatchewan. It is at the eastern end of Little Amyot Lake and accessed from Highway 155. The community is home to Amyot Inn and is surrounded by Little Amyot Lake Recreation Site.

== See also ==
- List of communities in Saskatchewan
