= Little Amyot Lake (Saskatchewan) =

Lake in Saskatchewan, Canada

- Streisel Lake
- Location in Saskatchewan Little Amyot Lake (Canada)
- Location: Northern Administration District, Saskatchewan
- Coordinates: 55.1834°N 107.8340°W
- Part of: Churchill River drainage basin
- Basin countries: Canada
- Surface area: 285 ha (700 acres)
- Max. depth: 19.6 m (64 ft)
- Shore length^{1}: 11 km (6.8 mi)
- Surface elevation: 427 m (1,401 ft)
- Settlements: Little Amyot Lake
- ^{1} Shore length is not a well-defined measure.

Little Amyot Lake is a lake in the Canadian province of Saskatchewan. It is situated in the Churchill River Upland ecozone surrounded by muskeg and boreal forest. The lake is in the Northern Saskatchewan Administration District near the southern tip of South Bay of Lac Île-à-la-Crosse. At the eastern end of Little Amyot Lake is the community of Little Amyot Lake and a provincial recreation site. Access is from Highway 155.

Prior to 1969, Little Amyot Lake was known as Streisel Lake.

== Little Amyot Lake Recreation Site ==
Little Amyot Lake Recreation Site (55.1806°N 107.8173°W) is a leased provincial recreation site at the eastern end of Little Amyot Lake. The site has a campground, lake access, and hiking and ATV trails. Activities at the lake include swimming, fishing, boating, and other water sports.

== Fish species ==
Fish commonly found in Little Amyot Lake include burbot, yellow perch, walleye, and northern pike. The lake is regularly stocked with walleye fry.

== See also ==
- List of lakes of Saskatchewan
- List of protected areas of Saskatchewan
- Tourism in Saskatchewan
