= Saskatchewan Highway 908 =

Provincial highway in Saskatchewan, Canada

Highway 908

Route information
- Maintained by Ministry of Highways and Infrastructure
- Length: 21 km (13 mi)

Major junctions
- South end: Île-à-la-Crosse
- North end: Highway 155 near Île-à-la Crosse

Location
- Country: Canada
- Province: Saskatchewan

Highway system
- Provincial highways in Saskatchewan
← Highway 905	→ Highway 909

Highway 908 is a provincial highway in the north-west region of the Canadian province of Saskatchewan. The highway runs from Highway 155 to Île-à-la-Crosse on Lac Île-à-la-Crosse and provides access to the Île-à-la-Crosse Airport and Northern Eagle Resort. It is about 21 kilometres (13 mi) long.

== See also ==
- Roads in Saskatchewan
- Transportation in Saskatchewan
