= Lac La Loche =

Lake in Saskatchewan, Canada

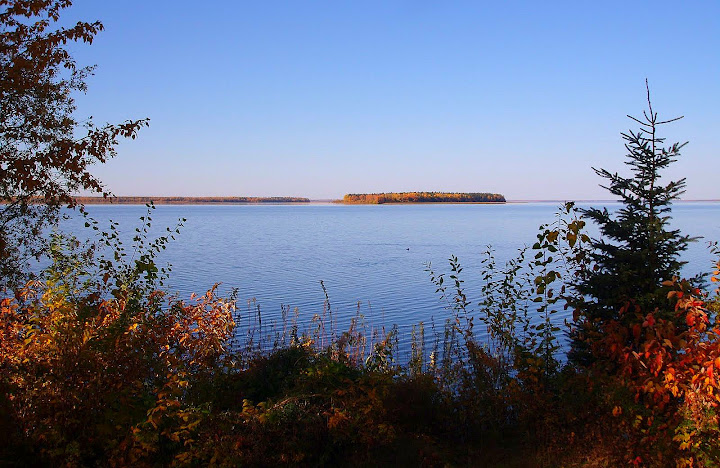
- Lac La Loche with a view towards Methye Portage

- Location of Lac La Loche in Saskatchewan Lac La Loche (Canada)
- Location: Northern Administration District, Saskatchewan
- Coordinates: 56°31′N 109°36′W
- Type: Glacial lake
- Part of: Churchill River drainage basin
- Primary inflows: Saleski River
- River sources: Canadian Shield
- Primary outflows: La Loche River
- Basin countries: Canada
- Surface area: 206 km^{2} (80 sq mi)
- Max. depth: 15.8 m (52 ft)
- Shore length^{1}: 130 km (81 mi)
- Surface elevation: 421 m (1,381 ft)
- Islands: Dog Island
- Settlements: La Loche; Clearwater River Dene Nation; Black Point
- ^{1} Shore length is not a well-defined measure.

Lac La Loche is a large lake in north-western Saskatchewan, Canada, near the Alberta border. The lake is at the headwaters of the Churchill River. The Churchill River is a major river that flows east into the Hudson Bay. The Methye Portage, which was an important portage during the fur trade era, connects Lac La Loche and the Churchill River system to Clearwater River in the Mackenzie River drainage basin.

Settlements on Lac La Loche include La Loche and Clearwater River Indian reserve on the eastern shore and Black Point on the southern shore. Access to the lake and its amenities is from Highways 955, 956, and 155.

== Description ==
Lac La Loche is a large glacial lake in the Canadian Shield of north-western Saskatchewan. It covers an area of 206 square kilometres (80 sq mi), is 15.8 metres (52 ft) deep, and has a shoreline measuring about 130 kilometres (81 mi). Its outflow, the La Loche River, flows out of the lake from the southern end. It travels south into Peter Pond Lake, which is connected to Churchill Lake, the source of the Churchill River.

The 19-kilometre (12 mi) long Methye Portage at the northern end of the lake leads north to the Clearwater River. The Portage is a National Historic Site and is also part of Clearwater River Provincial Park.

== History ==
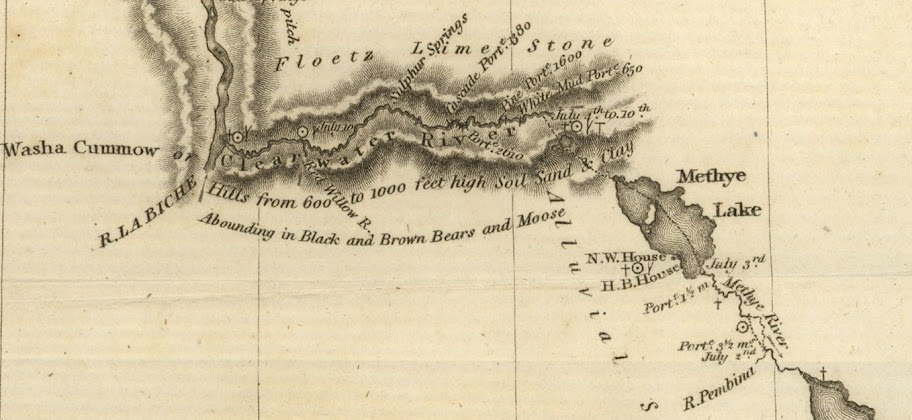
Franklin's 1819–1822 map shows the fur trade route from Peter Pond Lake to the Athabasca River and the NWC and HBC posts on Lac La Loche (Methye Lake).

Fur trade posts were built on Lac La Loche soon after Peter Pond came through the Methye Portage in 1778. An early indication of settlement comes from George Back who in 1822 noted in his journal: "We touched at the houses on the borders of the lake and embarked a man in each canoe".

John Franklin's Coppermine expedition map of 1819-1820 shows Lac La Loche as Methye Lake and the La Loche River as the Methye River. Both names for the lake and the river were in use at this time. George Back who accompanied Franklin used Lac La Loche, La Loche River and Lac La Loche House (the Hudson Bay Post) in his journal. Alexander Mackenzie in "Voyages from Montreal" used both Portage la Loche and Mithy-Ouinigam Portage (in 1789–1793).

== Fish species ==
The fish commonly found in Lac La Loche include walleye, sauger, yellow perch, northern pike, lake trout, lake whitefish, cisco, white sucker, longnose sucker, and burbot.

== See also ==
- List of lakes of Saskatchewan
