= Churchill Lake 193A =

Indian reserve in Saskatchewan, Canada

Coordinates: 56°08′31″N 108°12′08″W

- Indian reserve
- Churchill Lake Indian Reserve No. 193A
- Location in Saskatchewan
- First Nation: Birch Narrows
- Country: Canada
- Province: Saskatchewan

Area
  - Total: 159.8 ha (395 acres)

Churchill Lake 193A is an Indian reserve of the Birch Narrows Dene Nation in Saskatchewan. It is 80 kilometres (50 mi) north-west of Île-à-la-Crosse on the northern shore of Churchill Lake.

== See also ==
- List of Indian reserves in Saskatchewan
