= Turnor Lake 194 =

Indian reserve in Saskatchewan, Canada

Coordinates: 55°54′55″N 108°51′05″W

- Indian reserve
- Turnor Lake Indian Reserve No. 194
- Location in Saskatchewan
- First Nation: Birch Narrows
- Country: Canada
- Province: Saskatchewan

Area
  - Total: 2,445.9 ha (6,044 acres)

Turnor Lake 194 is an Indian reserve of the Birch Narrows Dene Nation in Saskatchewan on the western shore of Peter Pond Lake. It is about 84 kilometres (52 mi) north-west of Île-à-la-Crosse.

== See also ==
- List of Indian reserves in Saskatchewan
