= Alberta Highway 956 =

Proposed highway in Alberta, Canada

Highway 956
- La Loche Connector; La Loche Winter Trail
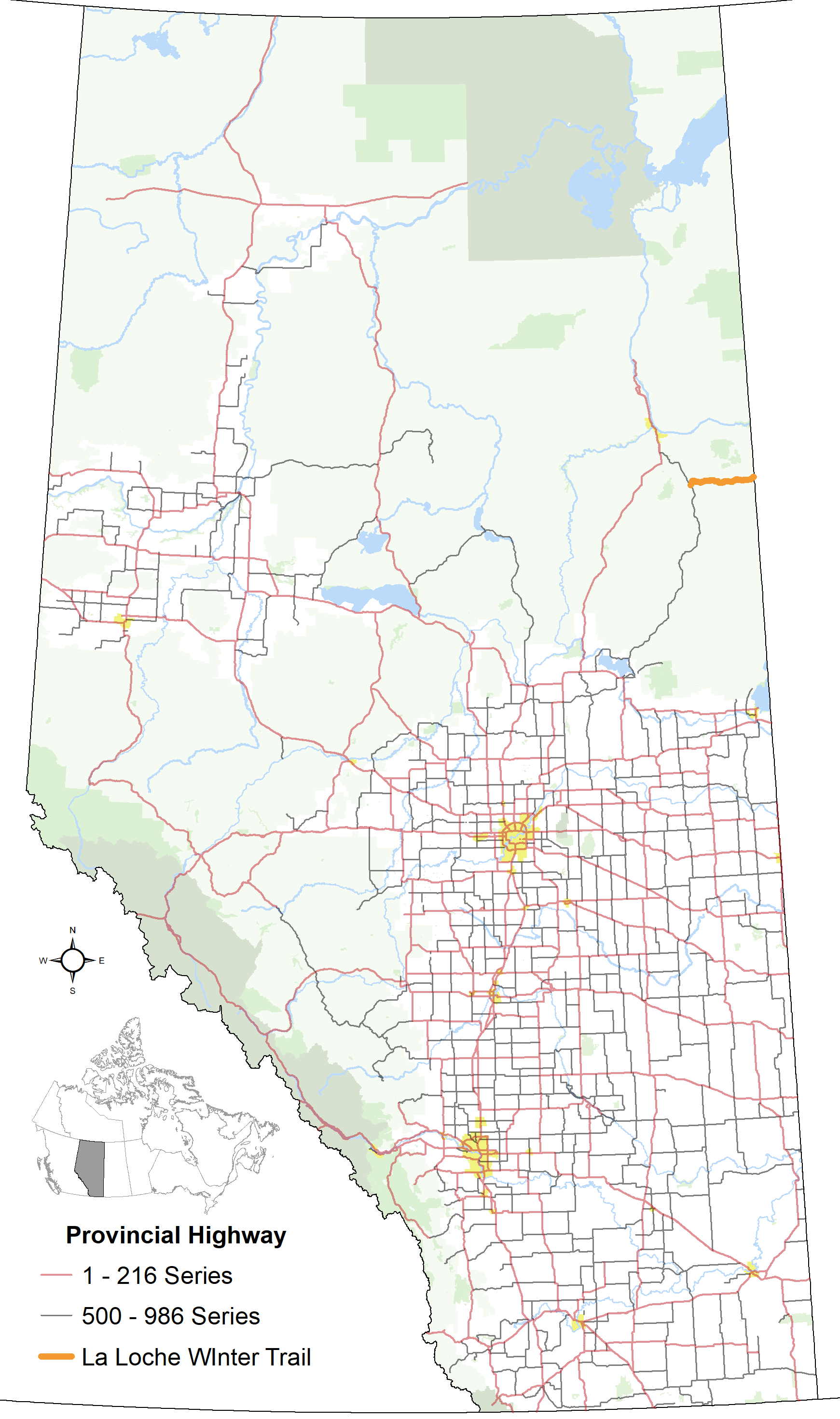
- Alignment of the La Loche Winter Trail in Alberta

Route information
- Maintained by the Ministry of Transportation and Economic Corridors
- Length: 65 km (40 mi)
- Status: Proposed

Major junctions
- West end: Highway 881 south of Anzac
- East end: Highway 956 at the Saskatchewan border

Location
- Country: Canada
- Province: Alberta
- Specialized and rural municipalities: RM of Wood Buffalo

Highway system
- Alberta Numbered Highway Network; List; Former
← Highway 947	→ Highway 986

Highway 956, also known as the La Loche Connector, is a proposed highway in northern Alberta, Canada that will connect the Fort McMurray region to La Loche, Saskatchewan. A previous iteration of Highway 956 was a north–south highway in central Alberta, that existed between 1974 and c. 1985 that now forms the northern portion of Highway 56.

== Route description ==
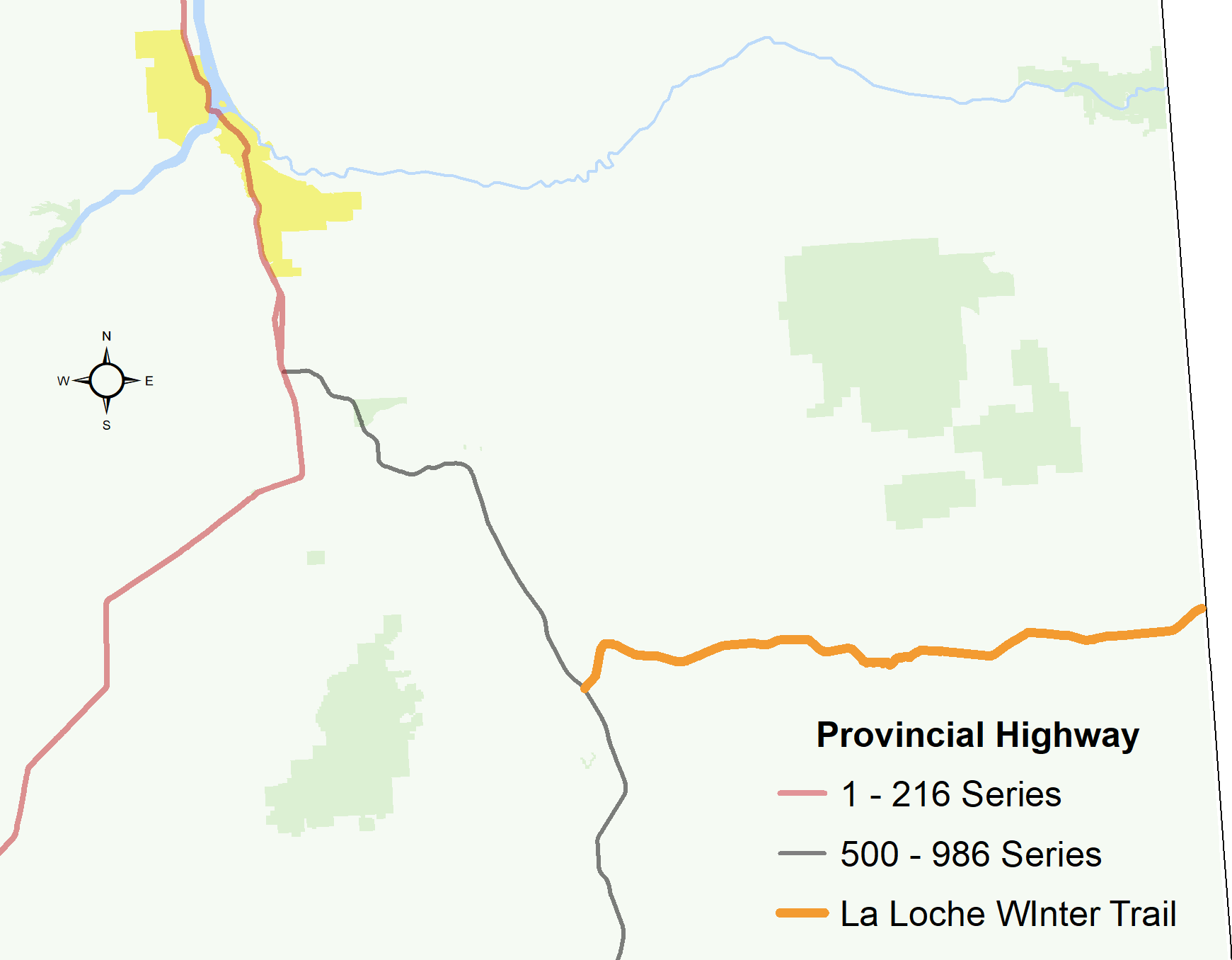
Alignment of the La Loche Winter Trail southeast of Fort McMurray between Highway 881 and Saskatchewan

Highway 956 is a proposed 65-kilometre (40 mi) all-weather road that will extend from Highway 881, 25 kilometres (16 mi) south of Anzac and 75 kilometres (47 mi) south of Fort McMurray, to the Saskatchewan border where will connect with Saskatchewan Highway 956 and continue to La Loche. The route is currently a winter road known as the La Loche Winter Trail and maintained by the Regional Municipality of Wood Buffalo. Highway 956 is in the planning phase for 2025. The Government of Alberta's proposed 2025 budget will allocate $7 million for construction if approved. Unlike other 900-series highways in Alberta, Highway 956 is not related to Highway 56, rather getting its number from its Saskatchewan counterpart.

== History ==
In September 2005, to celebrate the centennials of Saskatchewan and Alberta, Saskatchewan Premier Lorne Calvert and Alberta Premier Ralph Klein announced a project costing $45 million to connect La Loche and Fort McMurray with an all-season road. Saskatchewan subsequently completed 44 of 53 kilometres (27 of 33 mi) in 2008. In 2022, Saskatchewan Premier Scott Moe asked Alberta Premier Jason Kenney to commit to finishing the project, and construction of the final 9.8 kilometres (6.1 mi) in Saskatchewan began in August 2023. In July 2024, Alberta announced its commitment to the project with Alberta Transportation Minister Devin Dreeshen calling it "a priority project for the province". Funding in the amount of $7 million towards construction of the Alberta portion of the road was tentatively announced in early 2025.

== Former alignment ==
Highway 956
- Location: County of Stettler No. 6, Camrose County
- Length: 75 km (47 mi)
- Existed: 1973–1985

Secondary Road 956 (or Secondary Highway 956) was the previous designation applied to a 75-kilometre (47 mi) road between Stettler and Highway 13 east of Camrose. Established in 1974 in conjunction with the secondary road system, it was used as a temporary designation for the northern extension of Highway 56. The 30-kilometre (19 mi) section between Stettler and Highway 53 west of Donalda became part of Highway 56 in c. 1977, while the remaining 45-kilometre (28 mi) section became part of Highway 56 in c. 1985.
