= Beatty Lake (Saskatchewan) =

Lake in Saskatchewan, Canada

- Location in Saskatchewan Beatty Lake (Canada)
- Location: Northern Administration District, Saskatchewan
- Coordinates: 54.5134°N 107.8839°W
- Part of: Churchill River drainage basin
- Basin countries: Canada
- Surface area: 20.84 ha (51.5 acres)
- Max. depth: 10.4 m (34 ft)
- Shore length^{1}: 1.83 km (1.14 mi)
- Surface elevation: 345 m (1,132 ft)
- ^{1} Shore length is not a well-defined measure.

Beatty Lake is a lake in the Canadian province of Saskatchewan. The lake is set in rolling hills of jack pine forest and muskeg in Saskatchewan's Northern Administration District. The lake is adjacent to Beaver River near where Beatty Creek flows into Beaver River. Access is from the Hanson Lake Road.

== Beatty Lake Recreation Site ==
Beatty Lake Recreation Site (54.5108°N 107.8818°W) is a recreation site that encompasses the entirety of Beatty Lake and extends as far east as Beaver River and Highway 155. The park has 12 campsites, a fish cleaning station, dock, and a sandy beach. Several hiking trails branch out from the park into the surrounding hills.

== Fish species ==
Fish commonly found in Beatty Lake include splake.

== See also ==
- List of lakes of Saskatchewan
- List of protected areas of Saskatchewan
- Tourism in Saskatchewan
