= Saskatchewan Highway 909 =

Provincial highway in Saskatchewan, Canada

Highway 909

Route information
- Maintained by Ministry of Highways and Infrastructure
- Length: 29.4 km (18.3 mi)
- Existed: 1963–present

Major junctions
- West end: Highway 155 near Bear Creek
- East end: Avenue Lake / Avenue Joe Bagg in Turnor Lake

Location
- Country: Canada
- Province: Saskatchewan

Highway system
- Provincial highways in Saskatchewan
← Highway 908	→ Highway 910

Highway 909 is a provincial highway in the far north region of the Canadian province of Saskatchewan. It runs from Highway 155, beginning 7.5 kilometres (4.7 mi) south of the hamlet of Bear Creek, to the settlement of Turnor Lake. It is about 29.4 kilometres (18.3 mi) long.

The access road to Turnor Lake was built when Highway 155 was built to La Loche during the 1960s. Highway 909 was rebuilt beginning in 1997, and this update was completed in September 2001. It is entirely unpaved.

Along the highway are local trails leading to lakes. The Palmbere Lake access trail is 6 kilometres (3.7 mi) from the turn-off and the McAnesley Lake access trail is 22 kilometres (14 mi) from the turn-off.

Beginning at the terminus of Highway 909 in the village of Turnor Lake, the 12-kilometre (7.5 mi) long 909 Road leads south-east to the northern shore of Frobisher Lake.

== Major intersections ==
Rural municipality	Location	km	mi	Destinations	Notes
Northern Saskatchewan Administration District		0.0	0.0	Highway 155 – Buffalo Narrows, La Loche	Southern terminus
Northern Saskatchewan Administration District	Turnor Lake	29.4	18.3	Avenue Lake / Avenue Joe Bagg	Northern terminus
1.000 mi = 1.609 km; 1.000 km = 0.621 mi

== See also ==
- Roads in Saskatchewan
- Transportation in Saskatchewan
