= Garson Lake, Saskatchewan =

Northern settlement in Saskatchewan, Canada

Coordinates: 56.3126°N 109.963°W

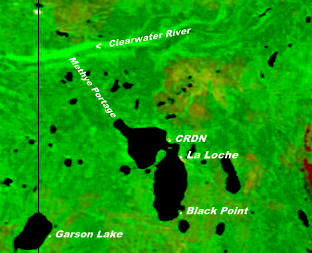
NASA image showing Garson Lake southwest of Lac La Loche

Location of Garson Lake in Saskatchewan

Garson Lake is a northern settlement in Saskatchewan on the eastern shore of Garson Lake. It is located near the Alberta border and can be accessed by Highway 956 off of Highway 155. A winter road connects it to Fort McMurray, Alberta in the winter months.

Garson Lake is 65 kilometres (40 mi) from La Loche and 136 kilometres (85 mi) from Fort McMurray.

The population of this northern settlement is 10 and is led by chairman Jocelyn LeMaigre. The northern settlement is an unincorporated community in the Northern Saskatchewan Administration District.

== History ==
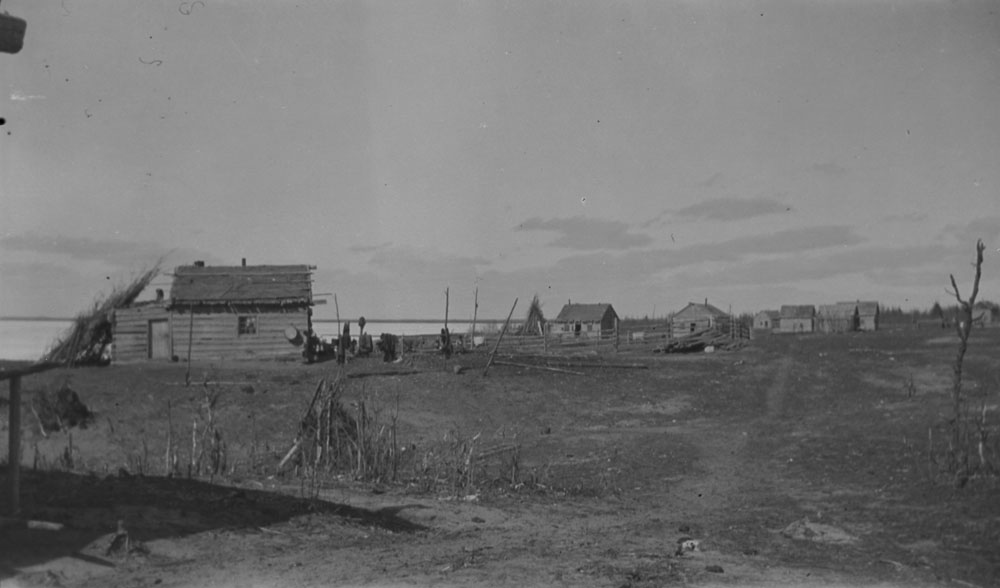
Garson lake in 1918

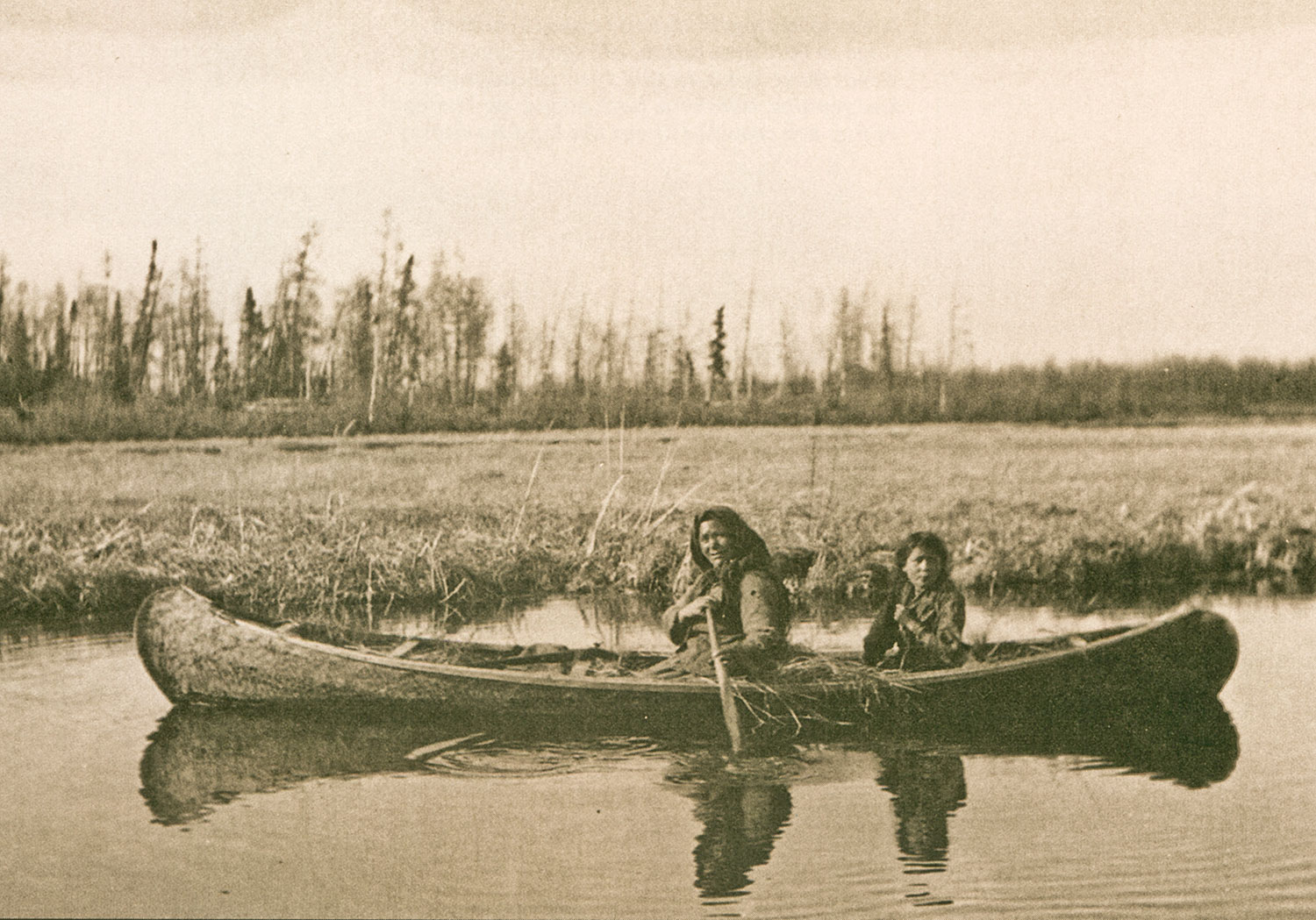
Dene woman and child on the shore of Garson Lake (no date)

The lake has been called Swan Lake then Whitefish Lake (Lac Poisson Blanc in French). In 1911 the lake was renamed Garson Lake after a Hudson's Bay Company post manager at Onion Lake, Saskatchewan.

Mgr. Grandin O.M.I. wrote in 1880 that there were 200 people at La Loche Lake and Whitefish Lake. In 1895, Father Penard of the La Loche Mission wrote that there was a settlement of 50 people at Whitefish Lake.

On August 4, 1899, the Dene residents of Garson Lake signed an adhesion to Treaty 8 at Fort McMurray. Their descendants came to be known as the Portage La Loche Band. Today they form the Clearwater River Dene Nation.

In the Piercy Report of 1944, the settlement was called Garson Lake or Whitefish Lake. The community had 17 families with 50 children under the age of 18. The community had no services of any kind and was not accessible by road.

In 1999, Garson Lake Road, a 44 kilometers (27 mi) access road from Highway 155, was completed to Garson Lake.

== Demographics ==
In the 2021 Census of Population conducted by Statistics Canada, Garson Lake had a population of 10 living in 9 of its 16 total private dwellings, a change of 0% from its 2016 population of 10. With a land area of 1.34 km^{2} (0.52 sq mi), it had a population density of 7.5/km^{2} (19.3/sq mi) in 2021.

== See also ==
- List of communities in Northern Saskatchewan
- List of communities in Saskatchewan
