= Buffalo Narrows =

Northern village in Saskatchewan, Canada

Buffalo Narrows ᒧᐢᑐᓱ ᐘᐹᓯᕽ mostoso-wapâsihk
- Northern village
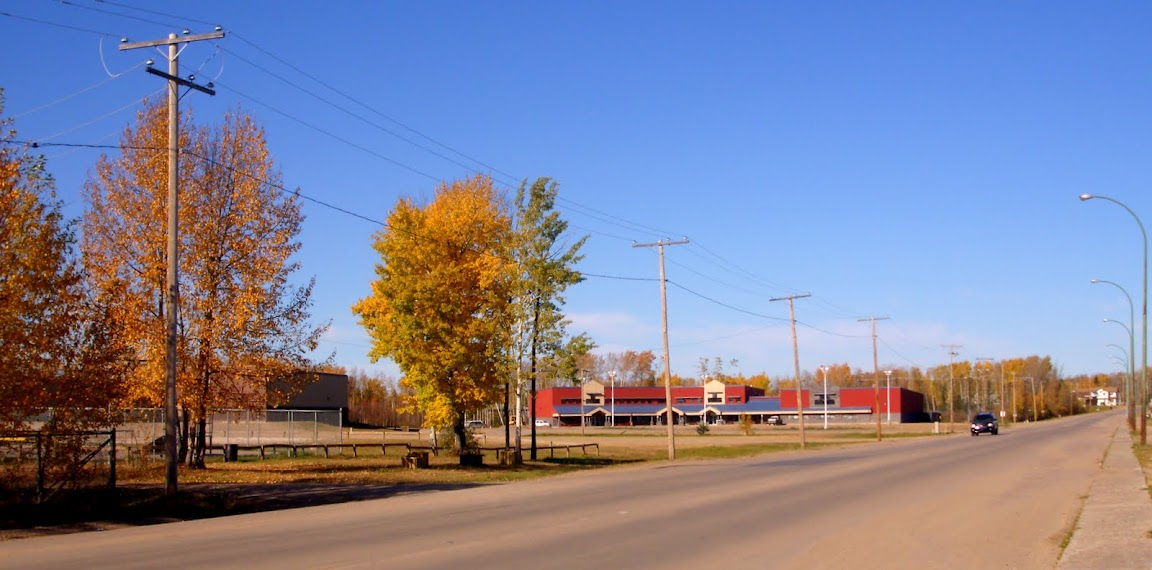
- New village centre in Buffalo Narrows

- Location within Saskatchewan Location within Canada
- Coordinates: 55°52′37″N 108°31′28″W
- Country: Canada
- Province: Saskatchewan
- District: Northern Saskatchewan Administration District
- Census division: 18

Government
  - Type: Mayor and council
  - Mayor: Shaylee Gardiner
  - Governing body: Buffalo Narrows Town Council
  - MLA Athabasca: Buckley Belanger
  - MP Desnethé—Missinippi—Churchill River: Gary Vidal

Area
  - Total: 68.63 km^{2} (26.50 sq mi)
- Elevation: 422 m (1,385 ft)

Population (2021)
  - Total: 1,014
  - Density: 14.9/km^{2} (39/sq mi)
- Time zone: UTC−6 (Central Standard Time)
- Postal code: S0M 0J0
- Area code: 306
- Highways: Highway 155
- Post office established: 1936
- Website: Official website

Buffalo Narrows (Plains Cree: ᒧᐢᑐᓱ ᐘᐹᓯᕽ, romanized: mostoso-wapâsihk) is a northern village in Saskatchewan, Canada. It is a community of 1,110 people. Located at the "Narrows" between Peter Pond Lake and Churchill Lake, tourism and resource extraction (logging, fishing) are its main economic activities.

== History ==
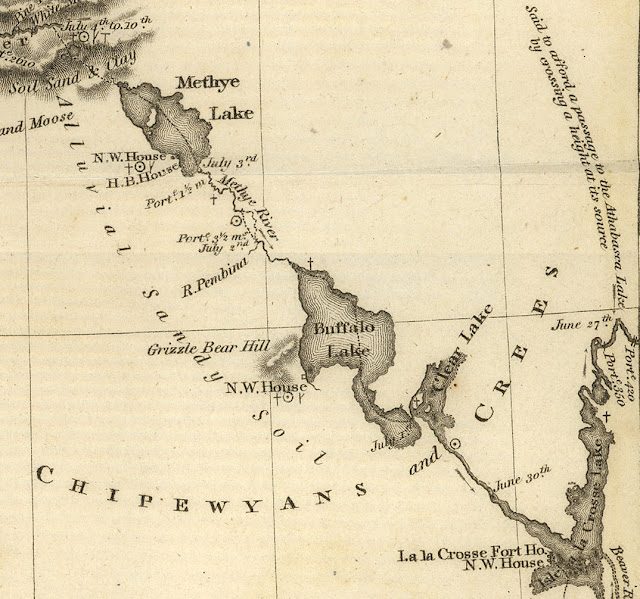
John Franklin's Coppermine Expedition map of 1819–1822 showing the fur trade route from Île-à-la-Crosse to Methye Portage

Buffalo Narrows or Détroit du Boeuf as it was called in French was founded in the early 20th century as trapping, mink ranching and fishing settlement by Scandinavian traders.

The community developed around an earlier Dene settlement. John Macoun, who was travelling the fur trade route from Methye Portage to Lac Île-à-la-Crosse visited the "Narrows" in September 1875. He described his visit to this old community in the following lines: "After sunrise, a headwind sprang up with which we battled all day and reached the "Narrows", that connect Buffalo and Clearwater lakes, before dark. "Chipewyan House" is situated at the eastern end of the "Narrows", and at the head of Clearwater Lake. Here the Chipewyans have built themselves several houses."

Chipewyan House where Macoun stayed for about four days was probably a small outpost of the Hudson's Bay Company much like Buffalo House at Dillon and Bull's House on the La Loche River.

Clearwater Lake (or Clear Lake) was renamed Churchill Lake in 1944 and Buffalo Lake was renamed Peter Pond Lake in 1932.

=== 1969 axe massacre ===
On 30 January 1969, the community was the site of the killing of the Pedersen family, and their friend John Herman. Seven people were killed by 19-year-old Métis labourer Frederick Moses McCallum (b. 1949), who was arrested, diagnosed with schizophrenia and found not guilty by reason of insanity. As of February 2019, he lives in Ontario.

== Demographics ==
In the 2021 Census of Population conducted by Statistics Canada, Buffalo Narrows had a population of 1,014 living in 373 of its 449 total private dwellings, a change of −8.6% from its 2016 population of 1,110. With a land area of 68.04 km^{2} (26.27 sq mi), it had a population density of 14.9/km^{2} (38.6/sq mi) in 2021.

Canada census – Buffalo Narrows community profile

	2021	2016	2011
Population	1,014 (-8.6% from 2016)	1,110 (-3.7% from 2011)	1,153 (+6.7% from 2006)
Land area	68.04 km^{2} (26.27 sq mi)	68.63 km^{2} (26.50 sq mi)	68.63 km^{2} (26.50 sq mi)
Population density	14.9/km^{2} (39/sq mi)	16.2/km^{2} (42/sq mi)	16.8/km^{2} (44/sq mi)
Median age	34.0 (M: 33.6, F: 34.4)	30.8 (M: 29.4, F: 33.3)	27.6 (M: 26.1, F: 30.2)
Private dwellings	449 (total) 373 (occupied)	430 (total)	449 (total)
Median household income	$84,000

References: 2021 2016 2011

== Climate ==
Buffalo Narrows has a humid continental climate (Koppen: Dfb) bordering on a subarctic climate (Dfc). Summers are comfortably warm with cool nights, while winters are very cold and dry.

Climate data for Buffalo Narrows, SK (1991–2020 normals, extremes 1979–present)
Month	Jan	Feb	Mar	Apr	May	Jun	Jul	Aug	Sep	Oct	Nov	Dec	Year
Record high humidex	12.7	19.4	17.7	28.9	34.8	38.2	40.4	41.0	32.5	26.2	12.8	10.1	41.0
Record high °C (°F)	13.0 (55.4)	15.0 (59.0)	18.0 (64.4)	29.6 (85.3)	31.5 (88.7)	36.0 (96.8)	33.5 (92.3)	35.0 (95.0)	30.9 (87.6)	27.2 (81.0)	13.5 (56.3)	10.0 (50.0)	36.0 (96.8)
Mean daily maximum °C (°F)	−12.4 (9.7)	−8.9 (16.0)	−1.7 (28.9)	7.3 (45.1)	15.2 (59.4)	20.3 (68.5)	23.0 (73.4)	21.4 (70.5)	15.3 (59.5)	6.3 (43.3)	−3.7 (25.3)	−10.5 (13.1)	6.0 (42.7)
Daily mean °C (°F)	−17.2 (1.0)	−14.2 (6.4)	−7.5 (18.5)	1.6 (34.9)	9.2 (48.6)	15.1 (59.2)	17.9 (64.2)	16.6 (61.9)	10.8 (51.4)	2.9 (37.2)	−7.0 (19.4)	−14.6 (5.7)	1.1 (34.0)
Mean daily minimum °C (°F)	−21.9 (−7.4)	−19.4 (−2.9)	−13.3 (8.1)	−4.0 (24.8)	3.1 (37.6)	9.9 (49.8)	12.7 (54.9)	11.7 (53.1)	6.2 (43.2)	−0.6 (30.9)	−10.2 (13.6)	−18.7 (−1.7)	−3.7 (25.3)
Record low °C (°F)	−47.0 (−52.6)	−44.0 (−47.2)	−43.5 (−46.3)	−31.8 (−25.2)	−11.5 (11.3)	−1.5 (29.3)	3.5 (38.3)	0.1 (32.2)	−5.5 (22.1)	−20.0 (−4.0)	−39.2 (−38.6)	−42.4 (−44.3)	−47.0 (−52.6)
Record low wind chill	−56	−56	−50	−38	−17	0	0	0	−12	−29	−50	−57	−57
Average precipitation mm (inches)	21.7 (0.85)	18.4 (0.72)	18.1 (0.71)	26.0 (1.02)	37.9 (1.49)	70.9 (2.79)	82.6 (3.25)	62.0 (2.44)	46.7 (1.84)	29.2 (1.15)	24.2 (0.95)	22.3 (0.88)	460 (18.09)
Average rainfall mm (inches)	0.5 (0.02)	0.4 (0.02)	2.1 (0.08)	9.5 (0.37)	35.8 (1.41)	61.5 (2.42)	80.1 (3.15)	62.3 (2.45)	43.0 (1.69)	19.3 (0.76)	2.0 (0.08)	0.8 (0.03)	317.4 (12.50)
Average snowfall cm (inches)	21.7 (8.5)	19.7 (7.8)	15.5 (6.1)	16.7 (6.6)	4.4 (1.7)	0.0 (0.0)	0.0 (0.0)	0.0 (0.0)	0.6 (0.2)	13.2 (5.2)	24.7 (9.7)	22.4 (8.8)	138.8 (54.6)
Average precipitation days (≥ 0.2 mm)	14.1	10.9	10.3	8.3	9.4	12.6	15.2	13.4	12.0	12.2	13.3	13.8	145.5
Average rainy days (≥ 0.2 mm)	0.5	0.3	1.2	4.0	9.0	12.9	14.9	12.9	12.0	7.2	1.3	0.6	76.7
Average snowy days (≥ 0.2 cm)	12.6	10.5	8.0	4.8	1.7	0.0	0.0	0.0	0.41	5.5	12.2	11.5	67.3
Average relative humidity (%) (at 3pm)	72.3	67.1	57.8	50.7	48.3	52.4	55.6	57.2	59.7	64.4	76.8	77.0	61.6
Source: Environment Canada (rain/rain days, snow/snow days, humidex, wind chill, humidity 1981–2010)

== Attractions ==
Buffalo Narrows is notable for its scenery and its bridge that crosses the Kisis Channel. The bridge was officially opened in 1981 replacing a ferry that was set up in 1957. This channel links Peter Pond Lake and Churchill Lake.

=== Buffalo Narrows Sand Dunes Park ===
The dunes of Buffalo Narrows Sand Dunes Park located 5 kilometres (3.1 mi) north of downtown create a 10 kilometres (6.2 mi) fine sandy beach along the southwest shore of Big Peter Pond Lake (55°53′35.90″N 108°36′39.64″W). The park, which is 3,650 hectares (9,000 acres) in size, includes the peninsula that nearly cuts Peter Pond Lake in two creating Little Peter Pond, the southern section and Big Peter Pond, the northern section. Formerly Crown land, the recreation area was transferred to the northern village of Buffalo Narrows in 2003. The community has assumed the responsibility for its maintenance and development. The beach is a nesting site of the vulnerable sparrow-sized piping plover.

=== Gallery ===
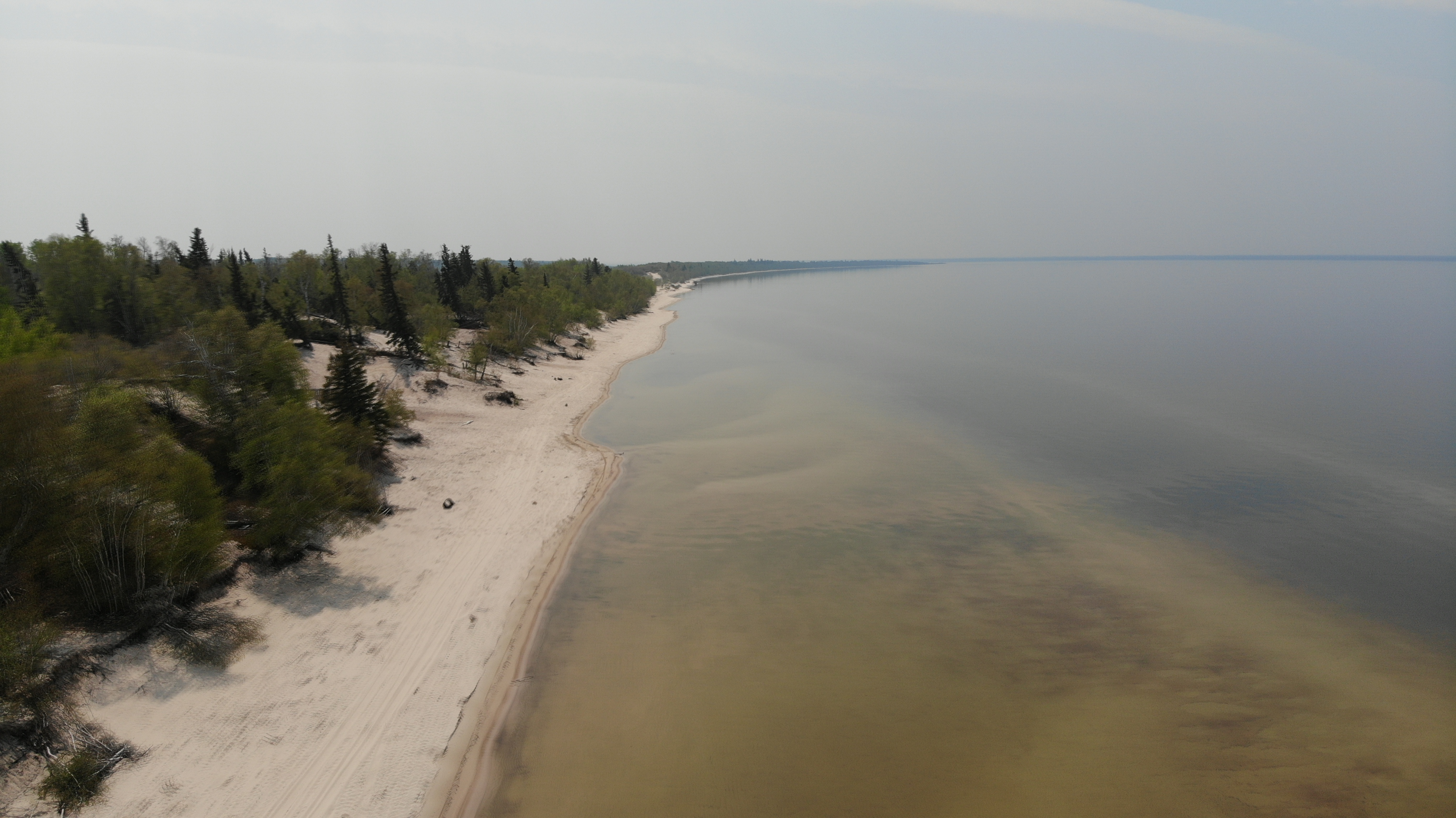
Buffalo Narrows Sand Dunes Park

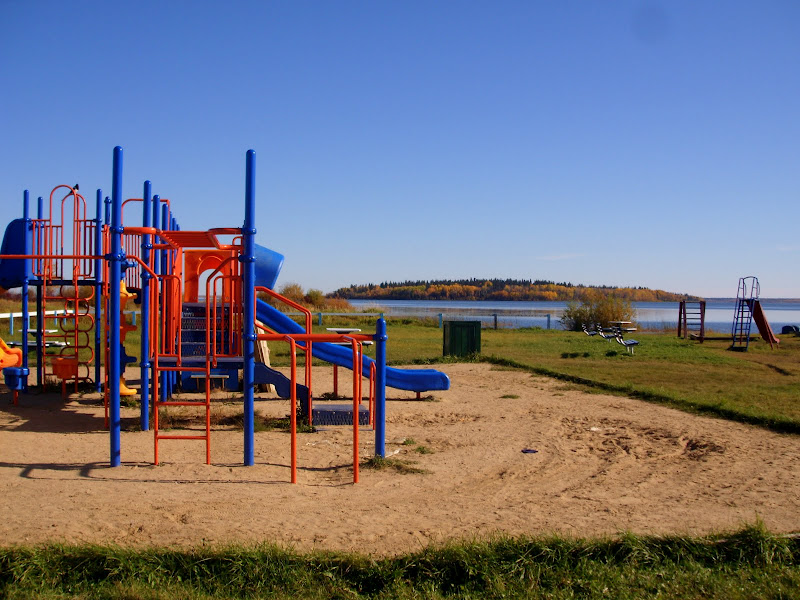
Park on Churchill Lake

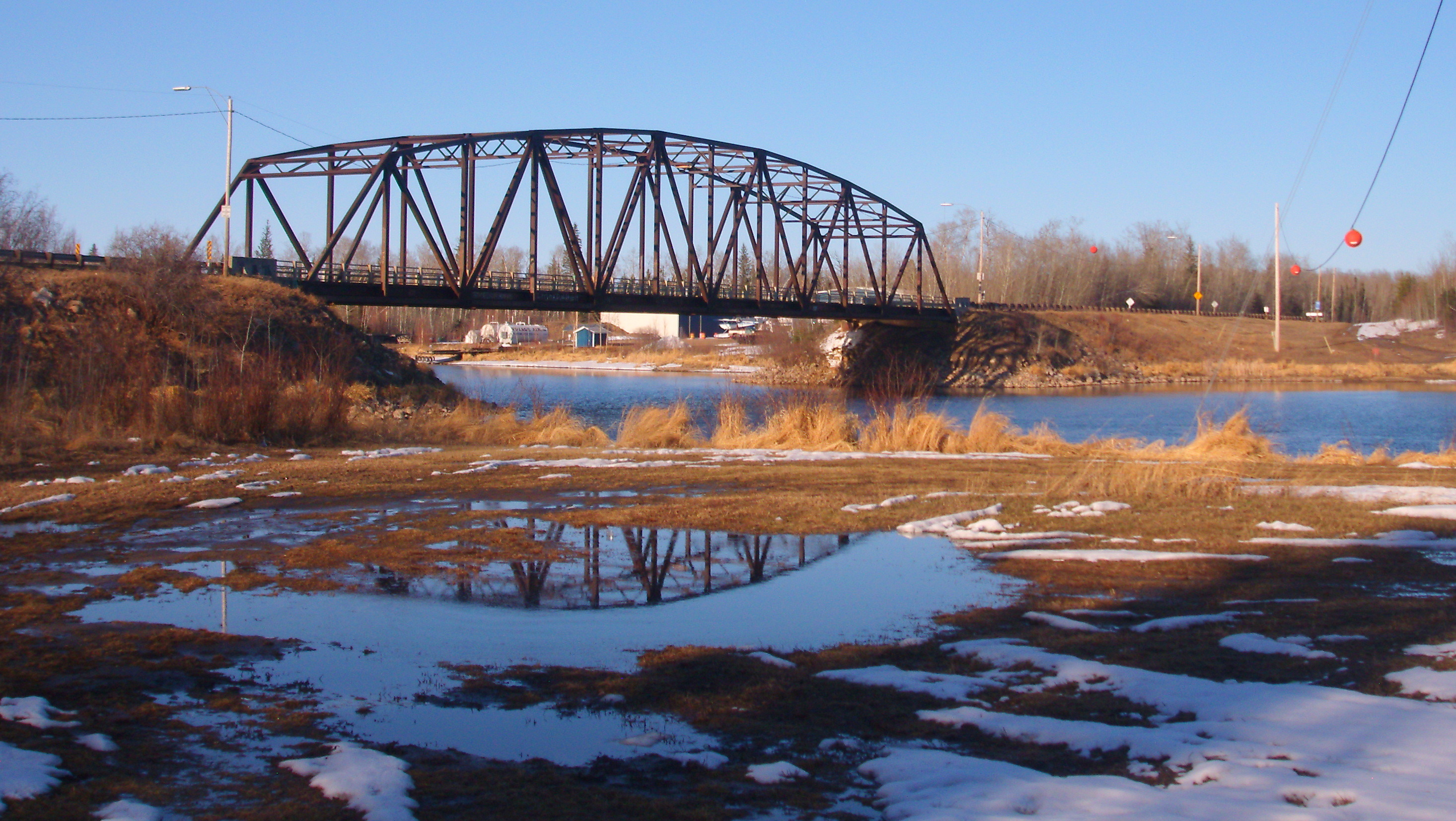
Highway 155 bridge over the Kisis Channel

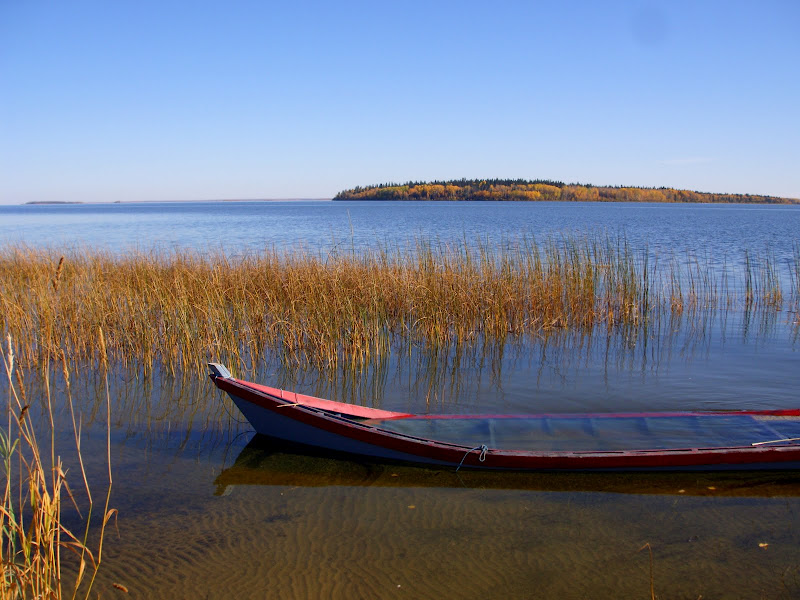
Churchill Lake viewed from Buffalo Narrows

== Governance ==
As set out by the Northern Saskatchewan Municipal Government Act, and overseen by Municipal Relations, the village is governed by six Councillors, who are elected at-large every four years. Shaylee Gardiner is the mayor.

== Transportation ==
Buffalo Narrows is connected to the rest of Saskatchewan by Highway 155. Highway 155 is paved along its whole length. The community is served by the Buffalo Narrows Airport and the Buffalo Narrows Water Aerodrome.

== Financial services ==
Innovation Credit Union has an Advice Centre located at #3-1491 Pederson Ave. The location includes a full service automated teller machine.

== Education ==
The school in Buffalo Narrows is called Twin Lakes Community School or "TLCS". The K-12 school has approximately 310 students and about 30 teachers and is part of the Northern Lights School Division # 113. Northlands College maintains a satellite campus in Buffalo Narrows.

== See also ==
- List of communities in Northern Saskatchewan
- List of communities in Saskatchewan
- List of villages in Saskatchewan
