= Frobisher Lake =

Lake in Saskatchewan, Canada

- Location of Frobisher Lake in Saskatchewan Frobisher Lake (Canada)
- Location: Northern Administration District, Saskatchewan
- Coordinates: 56.4097°N 108.0537°W
- Type: Glacial lake
- Part of: Churchill River drainage basin
- Primary inflows: Wanasin River
- Primary outflows: Simonds Channel
- Catchment area: 4,921 km^{2} (1,900 sq mi)
- Basin countries: Canada
- Surface area: 516 km^{2} (199 sq mi)
- Average depth: 5.5 m (18 ft)
- Max. depth: 19 m (62 ft)
- Water volume: 2,180,000 dam^{3} (1,770,000 acre⋅ft)
- Shore length^{1}: 424 km (263 mi)
- Surface elevation: 421 m (1,381 ft)
- Frozen: Nov—May
- Islands: Pinaskau Island; Wapiskaw Island; Waskwei Island
- Settlements: None
- ^{1} Shore length is not a well-defined measure.

Frobisher Lake is a large, irregularly shaped glacial lake in the northern part of the Canadian province of Saskatchewan. It is situated between Turnor Lake and Churchill Lake in the Churchill River drainage basin about 59 kilometres (37 mi) north-northeast of Buffalo Narrows.

There are no permanent settlements on Frobisher Lake — only an outfitters with four cabins. The closest community is Turnor Lake, which is accessed by Highway 909. From Turnor Lake, road access (Road 909) was built to Frobisher Lake.

== Description ==
Frobisher Lake is part of the Churchill River drainage basin. Its main inflow is from Turnor Lake via the short Wanasin River and its outflow is through Simonds Channel, which connects it to Churchill Lake. Pinaskau, Wapiskaw, and Waskwei are the largest of many islands on the lake. The freezing period of the lake is from November to May. It is the tenth largest lake in Saskatchewan.

== Fish species ==
Fish species commonly found in Frobisher Lake include walleye, sauger, yellow perch, northern pike, lake trout, lake whitefish, cisco, white sucker, longnose sucker, and burbot.

== See also ==
- List of lakes of Saskatchewan
