= Buffalo Narrows Airport =

Airport in Saskatchewan, Canada

- IATA: YVT; ICAO: CYVT; WMO: 71077

Summary
- Airport type: Public
- Operator: Ministry of Highways & Infrastructure
- Location: Buffalo Narrows, Saskatchewan
- Time zone: CST (UTC−06:00)
- Elevation AMSL: 1,423 ft / 434 m
- Coordinates: 55°50′31″N 108°25′04″W

Map
- Location in Saskatchewan CYVT (Canada)

Runways
Direction	Length		Surface
Direction	ft	m	Surface
06/24	2,297	700	Asphalt
12/30	5,006	1,526	Asphalt

Statistics (2010)
- Aircraft movements: 7,400
- Source: Canada Flight Supplement; Environment Canada; Movements from Statistics Canada

Buffalo Narrows Airport (IATA: YVT, ICAO: CYVT) is located 2 NM (3.7 km; 2.3 mi) east-southeast of Buffalo Narrows, Saskatchewan, Canada.

Courtesy Air (formerly called Buffalo Narrows Airways Ltd.) is based at the airport, where it operates its maintenance facilities and provides scheduled flights from Lloydminster and to Key Lake Airport and Collins Bay Airport.

Voyage Air maintains a base at the airport, including hangar and maintenance facilities for its Turbo Otter and DeHavilland Beaver.

== See also ==
- Buffalo Narrows Water Aerodrome
- Buffalo Narrows (Fire Centre) Heliport
- List of airports in Saskatchewan
