= Dillon River (Canada) =

Stream in Alberta and Saskatchewan, Canada

Coordinates: 55°55′38″N 108°57′08″W

Dillon River is a stream in Alberta and Saskatchewan, Canada. It discharges into Peter Pond Lake.

J. N. Wallace, a government surveyor, named Dillon River after a family member.

== See also ==
- Dillon River Wildland Park
- List of rivers of Alberta
- list of rivers of Saskatchewan
- Hudson Bay drainage basin
