= Christopher Turnor (judge) =

English Royalist judge

Sir Christopher Turnor (6 December 1607 – May 1675) was an English judge, knight and royalist.

He was eldest son of Christopher and Ellen Turnor of Milton Ernest, Bedfordshire. He matriculated at Emmanuel College, Cambridge in 1623. In later years he contributed towards the rebuilding of the college chapel, begun in 1668.

In November 1633 he was called to the bar at the Middle Temple. On 7 March 1639 he was appointed Receiver General of South Wales, jointly with William Watkins. He was elected a bencher in 1654.

During the English Civil War he supported the royalist side, and at the Restoration in July 1660 was made serjeant-at-law, third baron of the exchequer, and knighted. In October of that year he was placed on the commission for the trial of the regicides.

At the Gloucester autumn assizes in 1661 he displayed a degree of circumspection unusual in that age. One William Harrison was missing under suspicious circumstances, and John Perry swore that his mother Joan and his brother, Richard Perry, had murdered him. The grand jury found a true bill, but Turnor refused to try the case until Harrison's body should be produced. Sir Robert Hyde, before whom the same case came at the next Lent assizes, was less cautious. He allowed the case to proceed, the jury convicted the prisoners, and they were executed; but some years afterwards their innocence was established by Harrison's reappearance. Turnor surrendered the receivership of South Wales on 16 June 1662.

At York in the winter of 1663-4 he opened the commission under which several puritans implicated in the northern plot were sentenced to death. In the administration of the Conventicle and Five Mile acts he appears to have shown as much leniency towards the accused as the rigour of these statutes permitted. He was a member of the special court of summary jurisdiction created to adjudicate on disputes between owners and occupiers of property in the districts ravaged by the Great Fire of London.

In recognition of the services which in this capacity he rendered to the public, his portrait, painted for the corporation of London by Michael Wright in 1671, was placed in Guildhall. There is also an engraved portrait of him at Lincoln's Inn. Another portrait, by Sir Peter Lely, is at Stoke Rochford House. He died in May 1675, and was buried on the 19th in the church at Milton Ernest.

He married Joyce, sister of Sir Philip Warwick, and they had 2 children. Their son Edmund (d. 1679) was father of a son of the same name who died childless in 1764. Their daughter Joyce married James Master of Gray's Inn and East Langdon, Kent, on 18 December 1667; she was the maternal grandmother of Sir George Pocock and mother-in-law of George Byng, 1st Viscount Torrington. Turnor's wife Joyce died in 1707.

The estate of Milton Ernest was eventually sold to the judge's youngest brother, Sir Edmund Turnor (knighted 1663, died 1707) of Stoke Rochford, Lincolnshire, ancestor of Edmund Turnor.
