= Saskatchewan Highway 956 =

Provincial highway in Saskatchewan, Canada

Highway 956
- Garson Lake Road
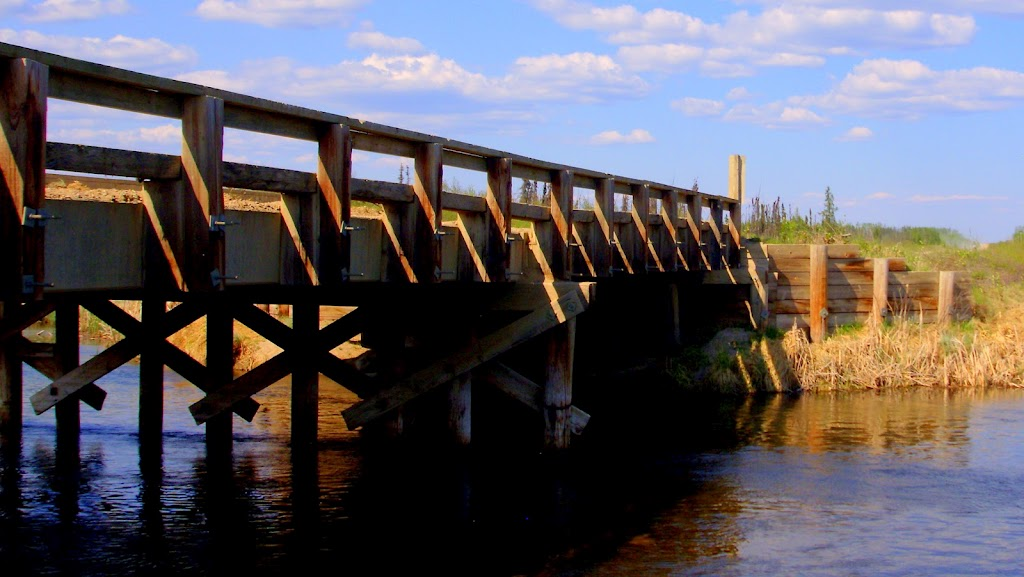
- Highway 956 road bridge over the La Loche River

Route information
- Maintained by Ministry of Highways and Infrastructure
- Length: 44 km (27 mi)
- Existed: 1999–present

Major junctions
- West end: Alberta border near Garson Lake; La Loche winter trail continues west (future Highway 956)
- East end: Highway 155 near La Loche

Location
- Country: Canada
- Province: Saskatchewan
- Rural municipalities: Northern Saskatchewan Administration District

Highway system
- Provincial highways in Saskatchewan
← Highway 955	→ Highway 962

Highway 956, also known as the Garson Lake Road, is a provincial highway in Saskatchewan, Canada. It runs from the Alberta border until Highway 155 near Lac La Loche. It is about 44 kilometres (27 mi) long.

Highway 956 is meant to connect the community of La Loche to Fort McMurray, Alberta. Beyond the Alberta border, the same route continues west as the 65-km La Loche Winter Trail winter road to Alberta Highway 881, about 25 kilometres (16 mi) south of Anzac, Alberta and about 75 kilometres (47 mi) south of Fort McMurray.

== History ==
- Construction began in 1986 and completed in 1999.
- In 1999, as part of the Saskatchewan provincial budget, a project was begun to gravel 30 kilometres (19 mi) of Highway 956.
- In September 2005, to celebrate the centennials of Saskatchewan and Alberta, Saskatchewan Premier Lorne Calvert and Alberta Premier Ralph Klein announced a project costing $45 million to connect La Loche and Fort McMurray with an all-season road. The premiers explained that this would create economic and recreational opportunities, as well as improved access to services and schools.
- A crushing project and two clearing projects had been initiated by the time the 2006–07 Saskatchewan Mid-Year Report was released. They were expected to be completed by the end of 2006.
- By May 2006, work began on improving Highway 956 as a joint project by the Alberta and Saskatchewan governments to connect La Loche and Fort McMurray.
- By 2008, 44 of 53 kilometres (27 / 33 mi) of Garson Lake Road were completed.
- August 2023, construction began on the final 9.8 kilometres (6.1 mi) to the Alberta border.

== See also ==
- Roads in Saskatchewan
- Transportation in Saskatchewan
