= Northlands College =

College in Saskatchewan, Canada

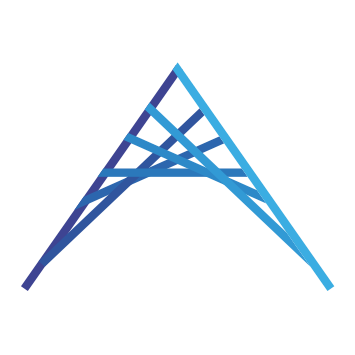
- Motto: Find Your North
- Type: Public Post - Secondary Education Institute
- Established: 1970
- Academic affiliations: Colleges and Institutes Canada, AUCC, University of Saskatchewan, Northern College, Cape Breton University, University of Regina, Saskatchewan Polytechnic and University of the Arctic
- President & Chief Executive Officer: Michael McCormick (Acting)
- Administrative staff: 150
- Students: 800
- Location: La Ronge; Creighton; Buffalo Narrows; Stony Rapids; Fond du Lac; La Loche, Saskatchewan, Canada
- Campus: Rural
- Colours: Blue & white
- Website: https://www.northlandscollege.ca/

Northlands College is a public post-secondary educational institution in northern Saskatchewan, Canada.

Northlands College is a public post-secondary institution located in northern Saskatchewan that provides post-secondary education and applied research services to Northern Saskatchewan and Beyond.

In 2023, Northlands College launched Saskatchewan's first Metaverse Campus.

The institution is home to one of three dental therapy programs in Canada.

The college is a Natural Sciences and Engineering Research Council of Canada (NSERC), Social Sciences and Humanities Research Council (SSHRC) and Canadian Institutes of Health Research (CIHR) eligible institution.

== Campus ==
The college has campuses in La Ronge, Creighton and Buffalo Narrows with Learning Centres in Stony Rapids and La Loche

== Governance ==
Northlands College is a public post-secondary institution. The college is governed by a 10-member board, representing people from across northern Saskatchewan.

== Partnerships ==
Northlands College offers post-secondary education to Northern Saskatchewan. The college hosts the SRnet presence in the region.

Northlands College maintains reciprocal arrangements with educational partners, including:

- University of Regina
- University of Saskatchewan
- University of the Arctic
- Cape Breton University
- Northern College
- Saskatchewan Polytechnic

Northlands College is an active member of the University of the Arctic. UArctic is an international cooperative network based in the Circumpolar Arctic region, consisting of more than 200 universities, colleges, and other organizations with an interest in promoting education and research in the Arctic region.

The college participates in UArctic’s mobility program north2north. The aim of that program is to enable students of member institutions to study in different parts of the North.

== See also ==
- Higher education in Saskatchewan
- List of agricultural universities and colleges
- List of colleges in Canada § Saskatchewan
