= Saskatchewan Highway 155 =

Provincial highway in Saskatchewan, Canada

Highway 155

Route information
- Maintained by Ministry of Highways and Infrastructure
- Length: 298.9 km (185.7 mi)
- Existed: 1947–present

Major junctions
- South end: Highway 55 in Green Lake
- Highway 165 near Beauval
- North end: Highway 955 in La Loche

Location
- Country: Canada
- Province: Saskatchewan

Highway system
- Provincial highways in Saskatchewan
← Highway 135	→ Highway 165

Highway 155, formerly known as Buffalo Narrows Road, is a paved, undivided provincial highway in Saskatchewan, Canada. It runs from Highway 55 near Green Lake until the village of La Loche at Lac La Loche, where it intersects with Highway 955. The highway services several communities and provincial recreation sites and is entirely within the Northern Saskatchewan Administration District. It is about 299 kilometres (186 mi) long.

Communities accessible directly from Highway 155 are Green Lake, Little Amyot Lake, Buffalo Narrows, Bear Creek, and La Loche. Some of the parks accessed from the highway include Beatty Lake Recreation Site, Beaver / Cowan Rivers Recreation Site, Taylor Lake Recreation Site, Lac Île-à-la-Crosse (South Bay) Recreation Site (also known as 'Ile a la Crosse War Veterans Park Campground'), Little Amyot Lake Recreation Site, Buffalo Narrows Sand Dunes Park, and Waterhen River Recreation Site.

== History ==
Highway 155 was begun in 1947 as a development road. It reached Buffalo Narrows in 1957 where a ferry was needed to cross the Kisis Channel. The road closely followed the path of the old wagon trail established by the Hudson's Bay Company. The official opening of Highway 155 from Green Lake to Buffalo Narrows was held in August 1963 in Green Lake. The old trail to La Loche was rebuilt soon after to become part of Highway 155.

A bridge built in 1981 now crosses the Kisis Channel next to where the ferry was once located. The Kisis Channel connects Churchill Lake to Peter Pond Lake. In the 1980s, the highway was straightened and paved.

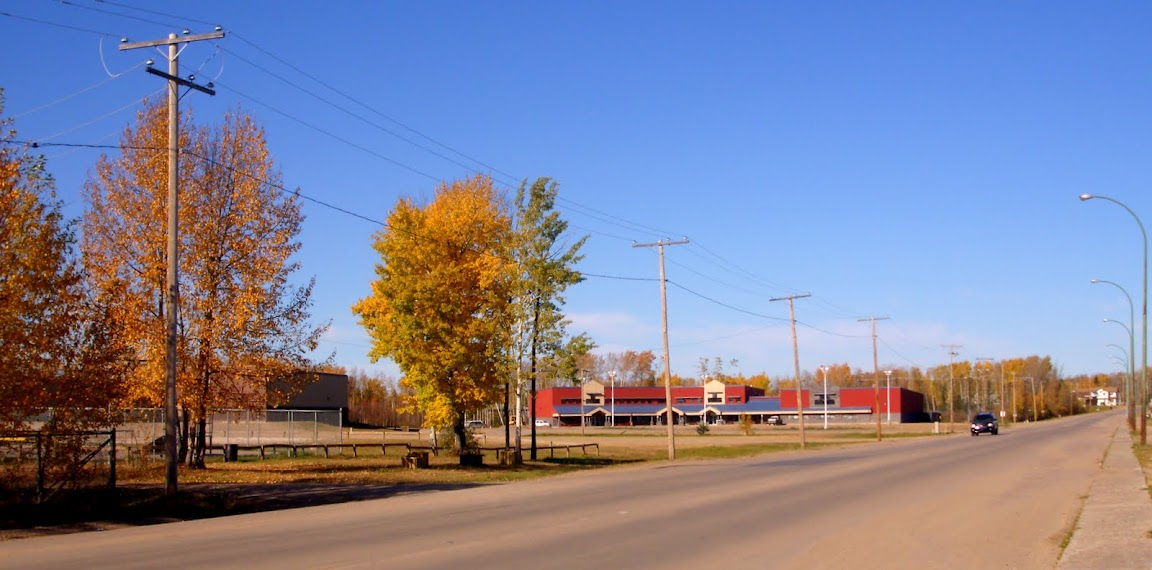
Hwy 155 at Buffalo Narrows looking north

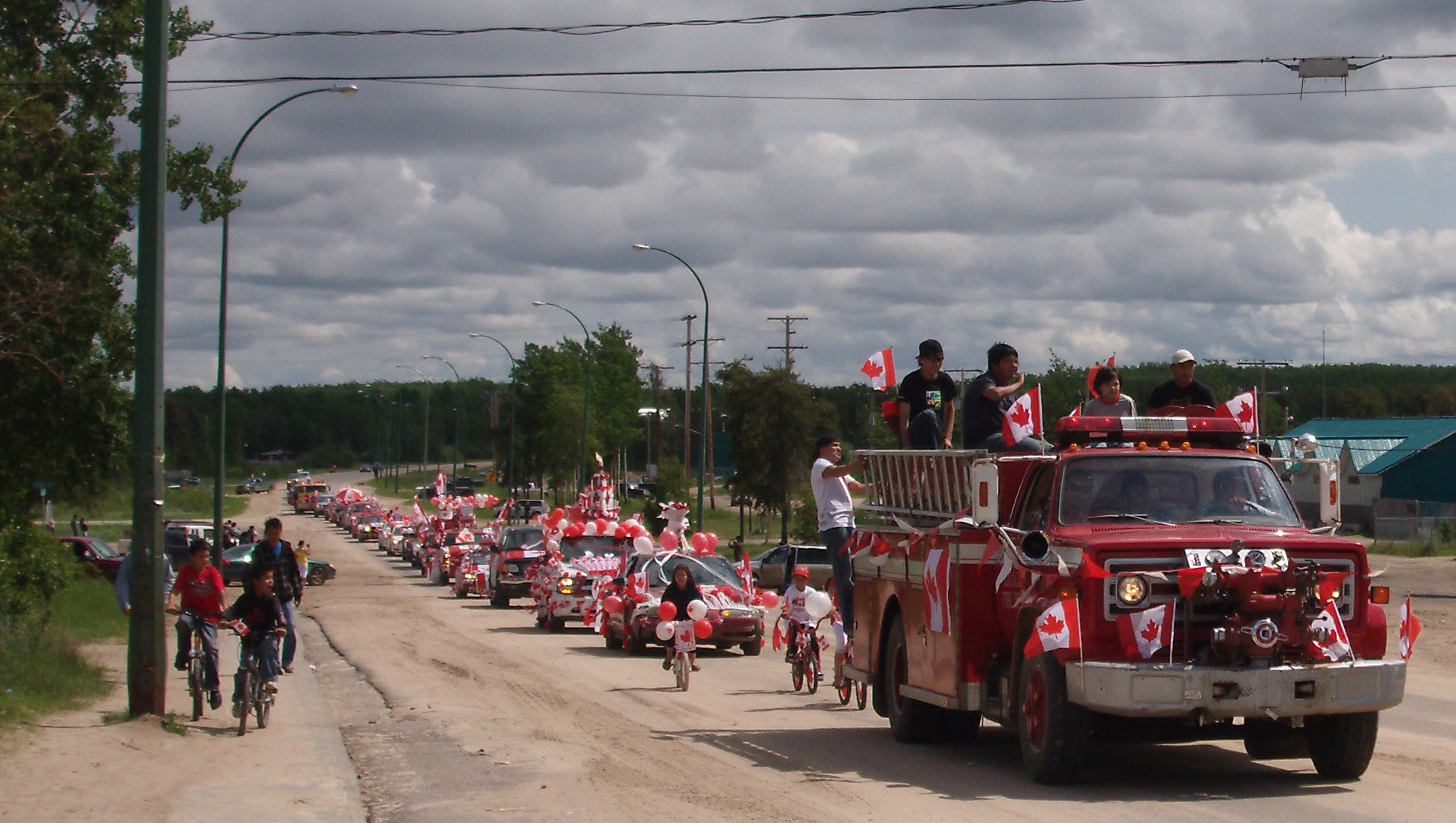
Highway 155 as it enters La Loche from the south. Highway 955 intersects on the left. (Canada Day 2008)

== Major intersections ==
From south to north:

Location	km	mi	Destinations	Notes
Green Lake	0.0	0.0	Highway 55 – Meadow Lake, Prince Albert	Southern terminus
	94.3	58.6	Highway 165 east – Beauval, Hwy 2	
	99.4	61.8	Highway 965 west – Canoe Narrows	
	153.6	95.4	Highway 908 east – Ile a la Crosse	
	186.2	115.7	Highway 925 west – Dillon	
Buffalo Narrows	195.2	121.3	Crosses Kisis Channel (connects Peter Pond Lake and Churchill Lake)	
	254.8	158.3	Highway 909 north – Turnor Lake	South of Bear Creek
	288.3	179.1	Highway 956 west – Black Point, Garson Lake	Winter road connection to Fort McMurray, Alberta
La Loche	298.9	185.7	Highway 955 north – Cluff Lake mine	Northern terminus
1.000 mi = 1.609 km; 1.000 km = 0.621 mi

== See also ==
- Transportation in Saskatchewan
- Roads in Saskatchewan
