= Edmund Turnor (antiquarian) =

English antiquarian, author, landowner and politician

- Born: 1755–56
- Died: 19 March 1829 (aged 74)
- Known for: Antiquarian, author, landowner, politician
- Parents: Edmund Turnor (father); Mary Disney (mother)

Edmund Turnor (born 1755 or 1756; died 1829), FRS, FSA, JP, was an English antiquarian, author, landowner and a British politician.

== Family ==
Turnor was the son of Edmund Turnor (died 1805) and his wife Mary (died 1818), daughter of John Disney of Lincoln, and was a descendant of Sir Edmund Turnor the brother of 17th-century judge Christopher Turnor. Turnor's father held estates at Stoke Rochford and Panton in Lincolnshire; following the death of his father, these estates passed to Turnor. He was married twice, first to Elizabeth (died 1801), the daughter of Philip Broke of Broke Hall in Suffolk, and sister to Sir Philip Bowes Vere Broke. The marriage produced a daughter, Elizabeth Edmunda. His second marriage was to Dorothea, daughter of Lieutenant-colonel Tucker and sister of Sir Edward Tucker KCB, producing five sons (Christopher, Cecil, Algernon, Henry Marten, and Philip Broke), and two daughters (Charlotte and Harriet). Of his and Dorothea's offspring, Christopher became a promoter and architect of Lincolnshire vernacular buildings, MP, and husband of Lady Caroline Finch-Hatton; Algernon became an Anglican cleric and married Sophia, daughter of Sir Thomas Whichcote, 6th Baronet; and Henry Marten became a captain in the King's Dragoon Guards and married Marianne Macdonald, daughter of 3rd Baron Macdonald, and a descendant of Lady Anne, sister of King Edward IV. Turnor was the maternal uncle to Sir William Foulis and Sir Thomas Whichcote. Edmund Turnor died on 19 March 1829 and was buried in the family vault, installed in 1801 at St Andrew and St Mary's Church, Stoke Rochford.

== Career ==
Turnor graduated from Trinity College, Cambridge with a BA (1777) and an MA (1781), after which he undertook a tour of France, Switzerland and Italy. In 1778 he was elected a fellow of the Society of Antiquaries, and in 1786, a fellow of the Royal Society. Before gaining fellowships Turnor commissioned drawings of antiquities found during his tour of Normandy, including that of a now non-existent fountain in the Place de la Pucelle, Rouen, these presented and read to the Society of Antiquaries, including a description of the fortress at Rouen (Château du Vieux Palais), built by Henry V. He later became a fellow of the Royal Academy of Rouen.

Turnor became a Justice of the Peace and in 1810–11 High Sheriff for Lincolnshire, and between 1802 and 1806, MP for the borough of Midhurst.

Among Turnor's friends and collaborators were the biographer Andrew Kippis, the antiquarians Daniel Lysons, Samuel Lysons and Richard Gough, the writer Bennet Langton, and the naturalist Joseph Banks who was a close friend. It was for Andrew Kippis that he provided in 1793 a memoir of Sir Richard Fanshawe for Biographia Britannica, largely based on his reading of Fanshawe's wife Lady Fanshawe’s manuscript memoirs of her husband. Lady Fanshawe, the daughter of Sir John Harrison, was the sister of Margaret, the wife of Turnor’s ancestor Sir Edmund Turnor. The Turnor’s gained possession of the Stoke Rochford Hall and estates from the Harrison family though this marriage.

In 1824 Turnor founded a National School in Colsterworth run under the principles of Scottish educationalist Dr Bell, which also served nearby villages and parishes of Stoke Rochford, Skillington, and Woolsthorpe. The school included a school room and an adjoining house and garden for the schoolmaster. A Roman bath was discovered by Turnor on the banks of the River Witham near Stoke Rochford.

== Works ==
Turnor's historical and antiquarian works and presentations include:

- Chronological Tables of the High Sheriffs of the County of Lincoln and of the Knights of the Shire, Citizens, and Burgesses, within the same, Joseph White, London (1779)
- Contributed to "Lincolnshire" in Gough's Magna Britannia
- Contributed to Archæologia "Extracts from the Household Book of Thomas Cony of Bassingthorpe, co. Lincoln", Archæologia, Society of Antiquaries of London, xi. 22-33
- Contributed to Philosophical Transactions "A Narrative of the Earthquake felt in Lincolnshire on 25 Feb. 1792," Philosophical Transactions lxxxii. 283–8
- "Sir Richard Fanshawe" memoir for Biographia Britannica
- London's Gratitude; or an Account of such pieces of Sculpture and Painting as have been placed in Guildhall at the expense of the City of London. To which is added a list of persons to whom the Freedom of the City has been presented since 1758, London (1783). Reprint: Gale ECCO (2010). ISBN 1171040202
- Description of an Ancient Castle at Rouen in Normandy, London (1785); also printed in Archæologia, Society of Antiquaries of London, vii. 232–5. Reprint: Gale ECCO (2010). ISBN 1170981755
- Edited Clarendon's Characters of Eminent Men in the Reigns of Charles I and II, London (1793). Reprint: BiblioBazaar (2009). ISBN 1110262582
- Presented A Description of the Diet of King Charles when Duke of York, London (1803) to the Society of Antiquaries of London
- Collections for the History of the Town and Soke of Grantham, containing Authentic Memoirs of Sir Isaac Newton, from Lord Portsmouth's Manuscripts, William Miller, London (1806)
- Remarks on the Military History of Bristol, containing the Royal Commission appointing Sir Edmund Turnor ... treasurer and paymaster of the garrisons ... ... With a Plan of the outworks of Bristol, Bristol (1823); also printed in the Archæologia, Society of Antiquaries of London, xiv. 119–31. Reprint: British Library, Historical Print Editions (2011). ISBN 1241606447
- A short view of the proceedings of the several committees and meetings held in consequence of the intended petition to Parliament, from the county of Lincoln, for a limited exportation of wool, in the years 1781 and 1782 (1824),
- "Account of a Roman Bath near Stoke in Lincolnshire" (1829), Archæologia vol XXII, Society of Antiquaries of London

Parliament of the United Kingdom
Preceded by Samuel Smith; George Smith	Member of Parliament for Midhurst; 1802 – 1806; With: George Smith	Succeeded by John Smith; William Wickham
