= Turnor Lake 193B =

Indian reserve in Saskatchewan, Canada

Coordinates: 56°28′01″N 108°40′21″W

- Indian reserve
- Turnor Lake Indian Reserve No. 193B
- Location in Saskatchewan
- First Nation: Birch Narrows
- Country: Canada
- Province: Saskatchewan

Area
  - Total: 296.7 ha (733 acres)

Population (2016)
  - Total: 476
  - Density: 160/km^{2} (416/sq mi)
- Community Well-Being Index: 58

Turnor Lake 193B is an Indian reserve of the Birch Narrows Dene Nation in Saskatchewan on the southern shore of Turnor Lake at the mouth of the Mikikwan River. It is about 124 kilometres (77 mi) north-west of Île-à-la-Crosse. In the 2016 Canadian Census, it recorded a population of 476 living in 131 of its 146 total private dwellings. In the same year, its Community Well-Being index was calculated at 58 of 100, compared to 58.4 for the average First Nations community and 77.5 for the average non-Indigenous community.

== See also ==
- List of Indian reserves in Saskatchewan
