= Churchill Lake =

Lake in Saskatchewan, Canada

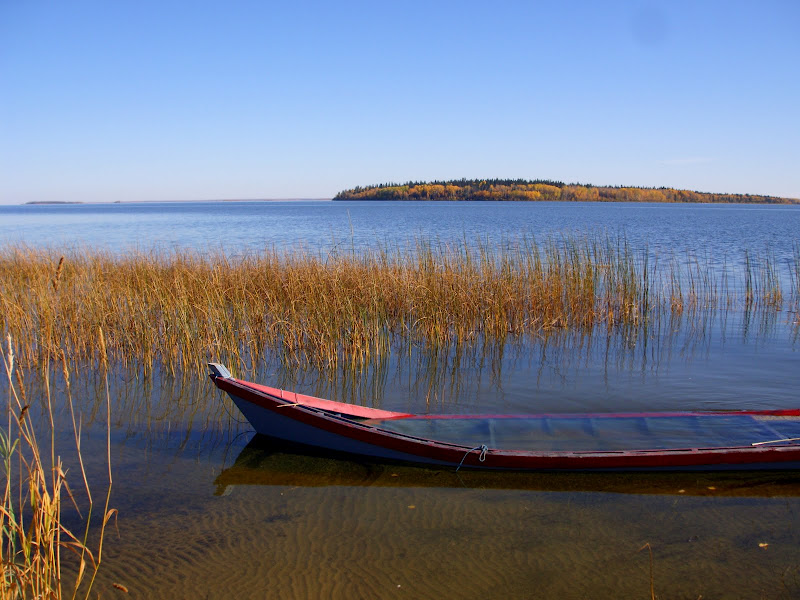
- Churchill Lake at Buffalo Narrows

- Location in Saskatchewan Churchill Lake (Canada)

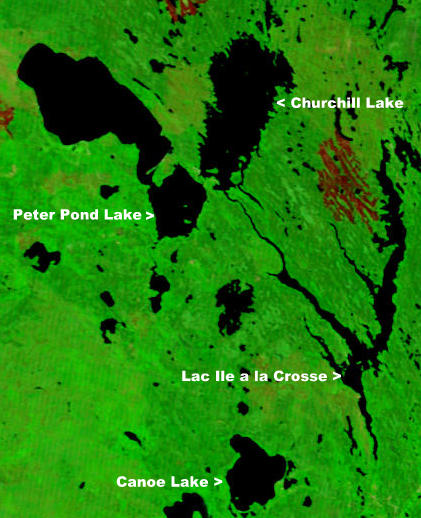
- NASA map showing Churchill Lake
- Location: Northern Administration District, Saskatchewan
- Coordinates: 55°55′N 108°20′W
- Type: Glacial lake
- Part of: Churchill River drainage basin
- Primary inflows: Kisis Channel from Peter Pond Lake; Simonds Channel from Frobisher Lake
- Primary outflows: Churchill River (MacBeth Channel) to Lac Île-à-la-Crosse
- Catchment area: 7,874 km^{2} (3,040 sq mi)
- Basin countries: Canada
- Surface area: 559 km^{2} (216 sq mi)
- Average depth: 9 m (30 ft)
- Max. depth: 24 m (79 ft)
- Water volume: 4.88 km^{3} (1.17 cu mi)
- Residence time: 2 years
- Shore length^{1}: 212 km (132 mi)
- Surface elevation: 421 m (1,381 ft)
- Islands: McKay Island; Allan Island; Page Island; Hay Island; Eagle Island; Akimau Island
- Settlements: Buffalo Narrows
- ^{1} Shore length is not a well-defined measure.

Churchill Lake is a large glacial lake in the north-western part of the Canadian province of Saskatchewan. It is the eighth largest lake in the province and the source of the 1,609-kilometre (1,000 mi) long Churchill River, which flows east into Hudson Bay. Frobisher Lake flows into Churchill Lake from the north through Simonds Channel and Peter Pond Lake flows in from the east through Kisis Channel. The outflow is at the southern end through MacBeth Channel, which flows south into Lac Île-à-la-Crosse. The lake can freeze over from as early as November and remain frozen till May.

The village of Buffalo Narrows is on the south-western shore near Kisis Channel and the Churchill Lake Indian reserve is at the northern end. Churchill Lake Outfitting is on the north-western shore. Access to the lake is from Highway 155 (which crosses Kisis Channel) and Buffalo Narrows Airport.

== Historic map ==
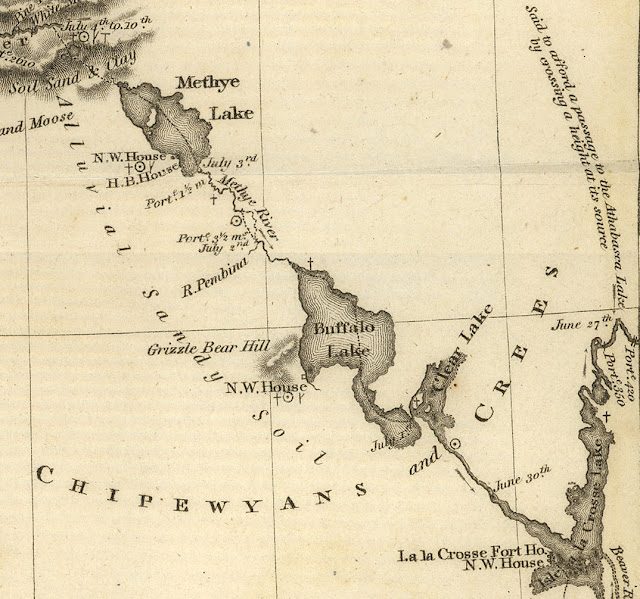
John Franklin's 1819–1820 map

John Franklin's Coppermine Expedition map of 1819–1822 shows details of the fur trade route from Île-à-la-Crosse to the Methye Portage. Churchill Lake is shown as "Clear Lake" with its northern reaches still unknown. The upstream lakes on the map include Methye Lake (Lac La Loche) and Buffalo Lake (Peter Pond Lake). Clearwater Lake (or Clear Lake) was renamed Churchill Lake in 1944 and Buffalo Lake was renamed Peter Pond Lake in 1932.

== Fish species ==
The lake's fish species include: walleye, sauger, yellow perch, northern pike, lake trout, lake whitefish, cisco, white sucker, longnose sucker, and burbot.

== See also ==
- List of lakes of Saskatchewan
