= La Loche River (Saskatchewan) =

River in Saskatchewan, Canada

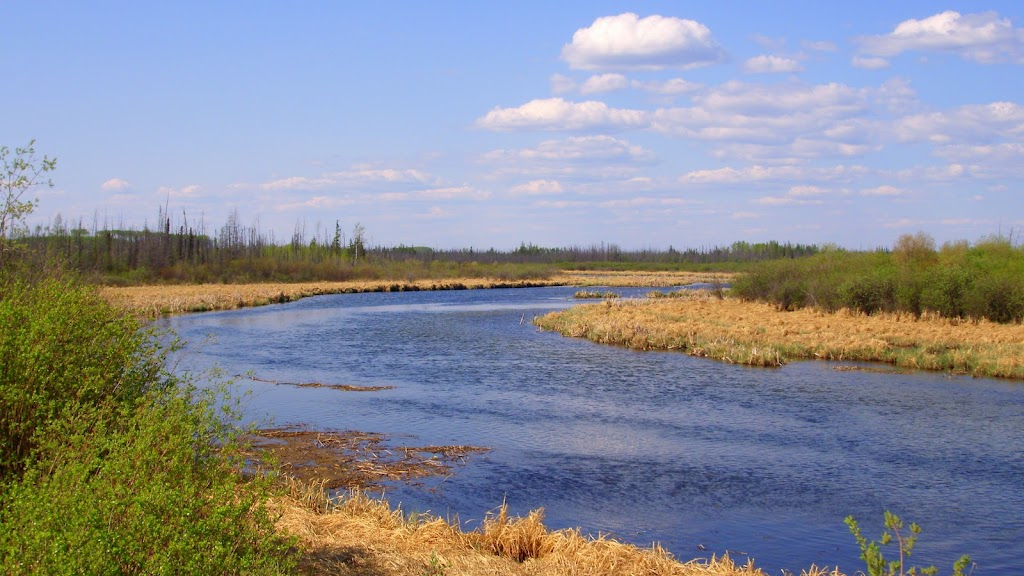
- La Loche River by the Highway 956 bridge

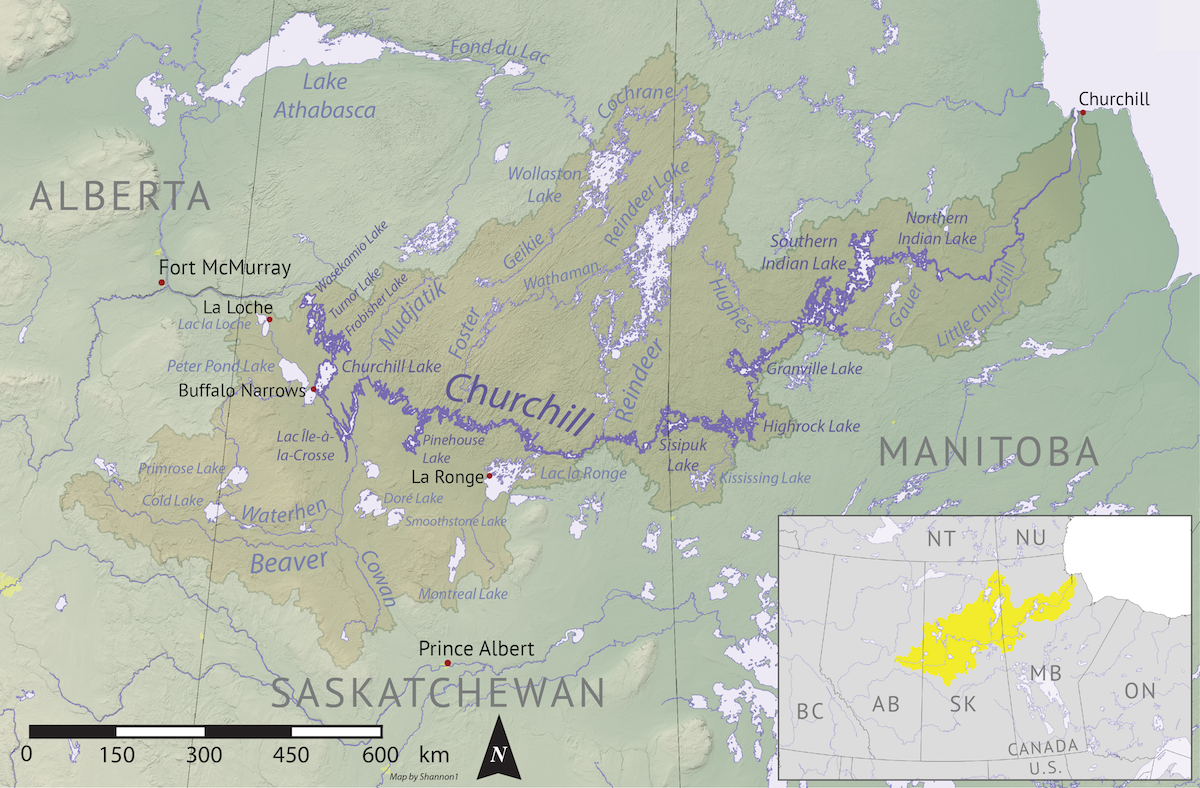
- Churchill River drainage basin

- Location of the mouth of the La Loche River La Loche River (Saskatchewan) (Canada)

Location
- Country: Canada
- Province: Saskatchewan

Physical characteristics
- Source: Lac La Loche
  - coordinates: 56°24′24.06″N 109°25′47.18″W
- Mouth: Peter Pond Lake
  - coordinates: 56°8′51.55″N 109°7′13.81″W
- Length: 56 km (35 mi)

Basin features
- River system: Churchill River drainage basin
- Tributaries
  - left: Kimowin River

The La Loche River is a river in north-western Saskatchewan, Canada. The distance from its source at the south-east end of Lac La Loche to its mouth at the north end of Peter Pond Lake is 56 kilometres (35 mi). The river is bridged by Highway 956 about 5 kilometres (3.1 mi) from its source. The Kimowin River flows in from the west.

== History ==
Two kilometres from the mouth of the La Loche River lies the old site of Bull's House (56°09′33.8″N 109°07′16″W). Bull's House was an outpost of the Hudson's Bay Company during the fur trade.

This hamlet may have begun as a North West Company post in 1795. A century later in 1895 according to Father Penard of the La Loche mission there were six families living there. In 1906 only 12 people remained. Oxen and horses used for hauling freight at Methye Portage were sometimes wintered there. During periods of high water that flooded fields at Bull's House hay was cut a few miles away at Hay Point (56°8′0″N 109°2′3″W) on the east side of Peter Pond Lake for the animals. It was also called the Riviere La Loche Post or La Loche River Post. An important fishery was located there and when the fishery at Ile a la Crosse failed one year Bull's House was able to provide the village with fish. All that remains of Bull's House is a cemetery on the east side of the river and on the west side a few cabins and a trail leading to Peter Pond Lake.

== Historic map ==
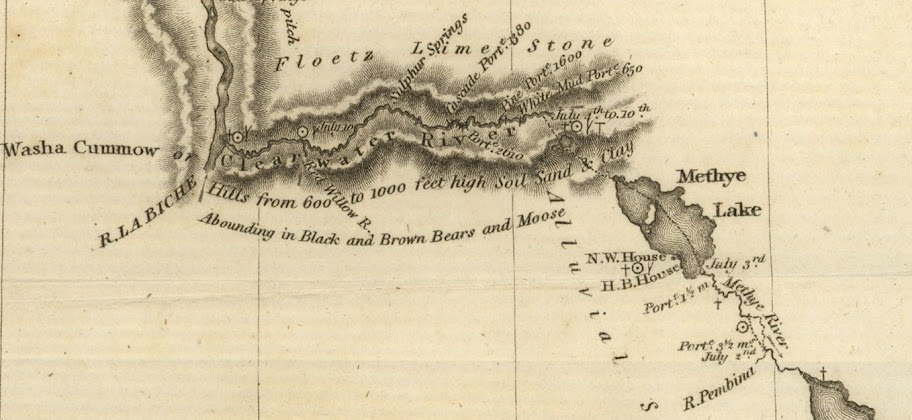
A section of John Franklin's 1819-20 expedition map showing the La Loche River as the Methye River

This section of Franklin's 1819–20 map shows the fur trade route from Peter Pond Lake, up the La Loche River (Methye River), across Lac La Loche (Methye Lake), across the Methye Portage to the west flowing Clearwater River then north up the Athabasca River. Shown on the map are the early trading posts of the North West Company and the Hudson's Bay Company situated on the south west side of Lac La Loche. The portages shown are measured in yards. Two portages are shown on the La Loche River.

== See also ==
- List of rivers of Saskatchewan
- Hudson Bay drainage basin
