= Methye Portage =

Canadian fur trade route portage

Coordinates: 56°34′26.74″N 109°41′58.25″W

Location of Methye Portage on the fur trade route from Lake Winnipeg to Lake Athabasca

The Methye Portage or Portage La Loche in northwestern Saskatchewan was one of the most important portages in the old fur trade route across Canada. The 19 km (12 mi) portage connected the Mackenzie River basin to rivers that ran east to the Atlantic. Peter Pond reached it in 1778. It was abandoned in 1883 when the Canadian Pacific Railway was completed across the prairies and steamboats began running on the Athabasca River. It ranks with Grand Portage as one of the two most important and difficult portages used during the fur trade era.

'Methye' is Cree and 'La Loche' is French for a fish that is called 'burbot' in English. Although 'Methye Portage' is often used the official name since 1957 is Portage La Loche. Both names are used in historical documents, books and journals. Alexander Mackenzie in his book "Voyages from Montreal" alternately called it Portage la Loche and Mithy-Ouinigam Portage (in 1789–1793).

== History ==
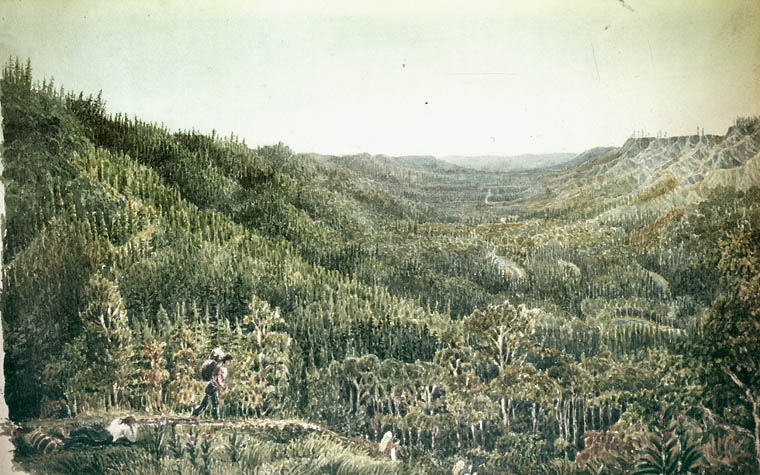
The Clearwater River valley from the portage by George Back in 1825

The Methye Portage was in use by indigenous peoples as a trade route for generations. They introduced it to Peter Pond in 1778. Although Anthony Henday crossed the prairies in 1754 by overland routes to the south, westward exploration was limited until this fur trade transportation route to the Athabasca came into common use.

From the winter of 1822, York boats came into use on this route in addition to canoes. Furs were transported up the Clearwater River by crews who would bring them to the centre of the portage, where they would be picked up by crews from Norway House for that portion of their transport.

It also allowed for the spread of smallpox to previously untouched indigenous populations, decimating them in a matter of years.

The Methye Portage was also used by Sir Alexander Mackenzie on his exploratory expedition to the west coast, an expedition which reached the Pacific Ocean in 1793, fully 12 years before the more famous Lewis and Clark Expedition.

From 1826 to the early 1870s the Portage La Loche Brigade from Fort Garry arrived at the Portage in July. This famous brigade of York boats would then return via Norway House and York Factory to the Red River Settlement; a 4,000 mi (6,400 km) round trip. For a number of years this brigade was under the leadership of Alexis Bonami.

The Methye Portage was in constant use until 1883 when the Canadian Pacific Railway reached Calgary and the Calgary and Edmonton Trail came into heavy use, ending more than 100 years as the main access to the north.

=== Missionary activity ===
After the first Oblates opened a mission in Île-à-la-Crosse in 1846 a Catholic priest was usually present when the brigades arrived at the portage. They were well received by the French Métis from the Red River Colony and by the Chipewyan. Father Émile Petitot describes his reception in 1862.

"We stayed at this mission, Father Émile Grouard and myself until the departure of the Mackenzie brigade, that is twelve days. I took advantage of the time to raise a conical chapel which I covered with white covers and colored decorations. An altar surrounded in white cloth stood the whole time we were there. It was in this improvised little temple that I had the joy of singing High Mass on the Sunday after our arrival, and to celebrate the holy mysteries each day in front of more than three hundred and fifty people, both Métis and indigenous."

— (translation)

In July 1845 Louis Laferte dit Schmidt, who was born on December 4, 1844, at Old Fort near Fort Chipewyan, was baptised at Methye Portage by Father Jean-Baptiste Thibault. Another noted baptism at Methye Portage was Francois Beaulieu who was baptised in 1848 by Bishop Alexandre-Antonin Taché.

== Route ==
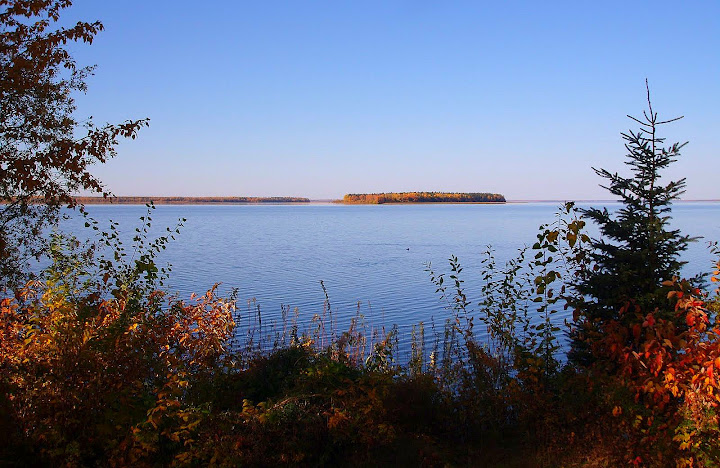
Lac La Loche with a view towards the Portage

The fur trade route, of which the Methye Portage was a link, began on Lake Winnipeg and ran west up the Saskatchewan River to Cumberland House, Saskatchewan, north up the Sturgeon-Weir River, across Frog Portage to the Churchill River, west up the Churchill past the depot on Lac Île-à-la-Crosse, through Peter Pond Lake to Lac La Loche.

Methye Portage proper, which is 19 km (12 mi) long, began at Wallis Bay on the north side of Lac La Loche. The path ascends slowly for 8 mi (13 km) to the small Rendezvous Lake. Here, crews coming from the north and south would exchange their pack loads. Different boats were used above and below the portage so were rarely carried across it. This point is the edge of the Mackenzie River watershed.

The path ascends slowly from Rendezvous Lake until there is suddenly a view of the Clearwater River valley. The path descends about 180 m (590 ft) in 3 or 4 mi (4.8 or 6.4 km) to the Clearwater. The altitude of Lac La Loche is about 1,460 ft (450 m), Rendezvous Lake about 1,680 ft (510 m) and the Clearwater about 1,035 ft (315 m). This section is so steep that sledges, horses and oxen were used. The portage road, which is wide enough for a wagon, is still visible.

After the voyageurs reached the Clearwater River, it was possible to go west down the Clearwater River to its joining with the Athabasca River, at the site of modern-day Fort McMurray, and then north down the Athabasca River to Fort Chipewyan and beyond into the north country.

=== Staging area ===
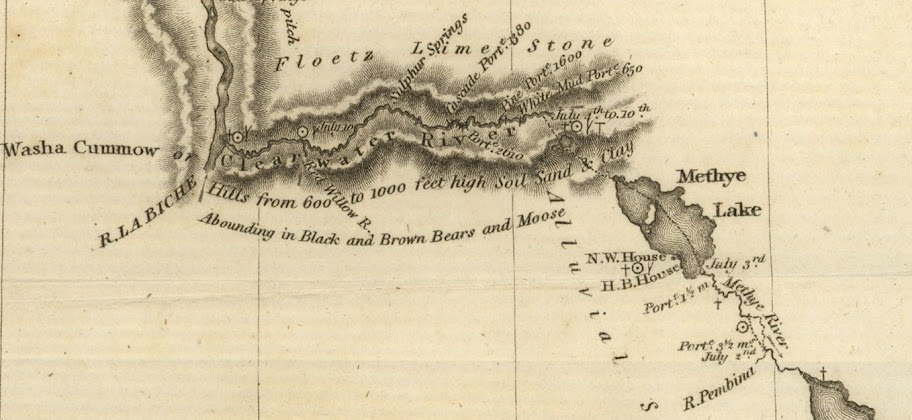
This section of John Franklin's 1819-20 expedition map shows the fur trade route from Peter Pond Lake, up the La Loche River (Methye River), across Lac La Loche (Methye Lake), across the Portage to the west flowing Clearwater River then north up the Athabasca River. Early trading posts of the North West Company and the Hudson's Bay Company are shown on the south west side of Lac La Loche.

For two weeks every July the south end of the portage was the main staging area for transferring freight up the trail.

In 1862 there were 400 people at the portage according to Father Émile Petitot. There were the two Portage La Loche brigades with 7 boats each and the Athabasca and Mackenzie brigades with 5 boats each. They had 225 men as crew and over 30 passengers. One canot du nord arrived with a crew of 6-8 Iroquois and two passengers. Dene residents from the surrounding area were camped at the portage in a tipi village of 150 people. The Hudson's Bay Company had 10 employees at the fort who maintained the transportation depots at each end of the portage and brought in horses, oxen and carts for the season.

Petitot wrote "While there were no more than 400 people gathered at the time on the south side of the portage they gave us a little understanding of the confusion of languages at the Tower of Babel. There were people from French Canada, Scotland, Orkney, England, Norway. There were Woodland Cree, Swampy Cree, Chippewa, Chipewyan, Beaver and Métis of all kinds. Grouard and I represented the French." (translation).

=== Portage trail ===
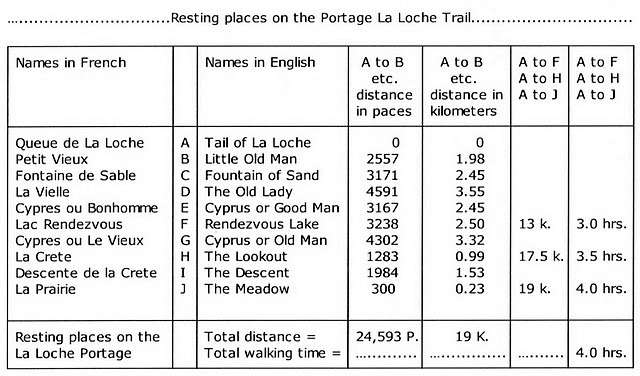
Made by rdlaloche in 2011

Names were given to different locations on the Portage trail by the fur brigades. On the table starting from the south end are some of the names in French and their translation.

These resting places were measured in paces wrote Sir John Richardson in 1848. From the Tail of La Loche to Little Old Man the distance was 2,557 paces. Another 3,171 paces led to Fountain of Sand and so on. The total number of paces from the Tail of La Loche to The Meadow is 24,593 or 1,294 paces per kilometre. Most of these resting places on the Portage have not yet been identified. Under ideal conditions 19 km (12 mi) is walked at an easy pace in about 4 hours.

=== Cemetery ===
Along the Portage Trail there were marked graves from the fur trade era according to the following Oblate account written in 1933 by Father Louis Moraud.

"We started walking the trail hoping to find a few traces of the past. But this place like the vast oceans keep their secrets. Nature and the elements soon erase every trace of man. Our guide showed us a place of burial. The cross had been razed by fire. Other crosses had marked the graves of a few more adventurers. These too had disappeared."

— (translation).

== National historic site ==
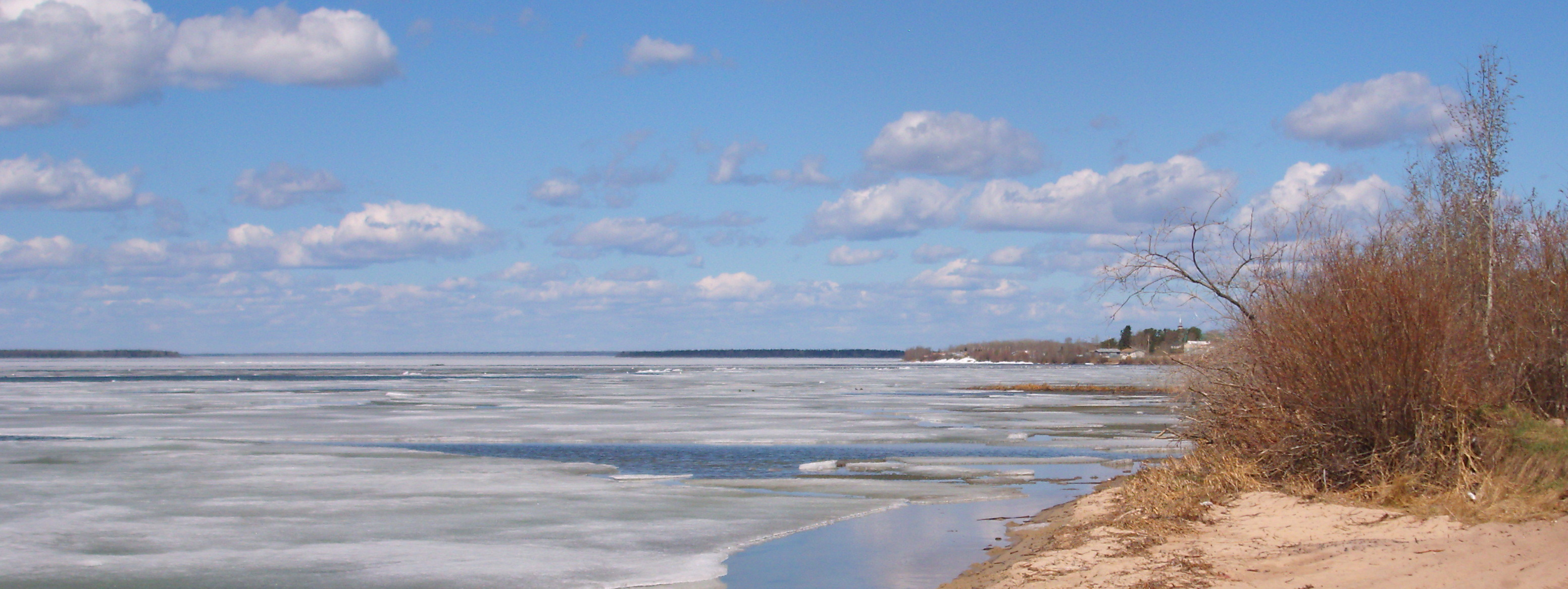
Ice break-up on Lac La Loche May 13, 2013 (Ice covers the lake from about the middle of November to about the middle of May).

The Methye Portage was designated a National Historic Site in 1933 and the Clearwater River was designated a Canadian Heritage River in 1986. Today the Methye Portage and the Saskatchewan portion of the Clearwater River are within the Clearwater River Provincial Park.

A bronze plaque is set in a stone cairn at the entrance to the portage. The dedication is written in French and English. The English version is quoted:

"In 1778 Peter Pond became the first white man to cross the 12 mile portage between Lac La Loche and the Clearwater River, thus opening the rich Athabasca region to direct trade. For over forty years, until the opening of the Edmonton-Fort Assiniboine trail, this portage was the only practical link with the Athabasca and the Peace and Mackenzie rivers beyond. Many famous traders and explorers followed this route. In the 1820s, the practice of hauling boats over the watershed was discontinued and a York boat terminus was established at each end of the portage."
Historic Sites and Monuments Board of Canada. Government of Canada

== See also ==
- Canadian canoe routes
- Continental Divide
