= Peter Pond Lake =

Lake in Saskatchewan, Canada

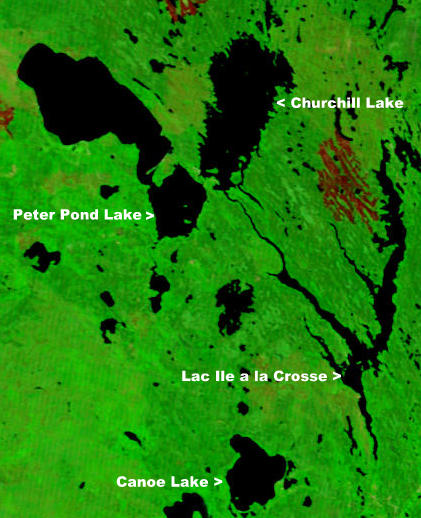
- NASA map showing Peter Pond Lake

- Location in Saskatchewan Peter Pond Lake (Canada)
- Location: Northern Saskatchewan Administration District
- Coordinates: 55.9161°N 108.7341°W
- Type: Glacial lake
- Part of: Churchill River drainage basin
- Primary inflows: Dillon River; La Loche River
- Primary outflows: Kisis Channel
- Catchment area: 9,713 km^{2} (3,750 sq mi)
- Basin countries: Canada
- Surface area: 778 km^{2} (300 sq mi)
- Average depth: 13.7 m (45 ft)
- Max. depth: 24 m (79 ft)
- Water volume: 10.6 km^{3} (2.5 cu mi)
- Residence time: 6.5 years
- Shore length^{1}: 124 km (77 mi)
- Surface elevation: 421 m (1,381 ft)
- Islands: Kazan Island; Chartier Island
- Settlements: Buffalo Narrows; Dillon; Michel Village
- ^{1} Shore length is not a well-defined measure.

Peter Pond Lake is a glacial lake in the north-western part of the Canadian province of Saskatchewan. The lake is located in the boreal forest and Canadian Shield within the Churchill River drainage basin. It is the sixth largest lake in Saskatchewan.

== Description ==
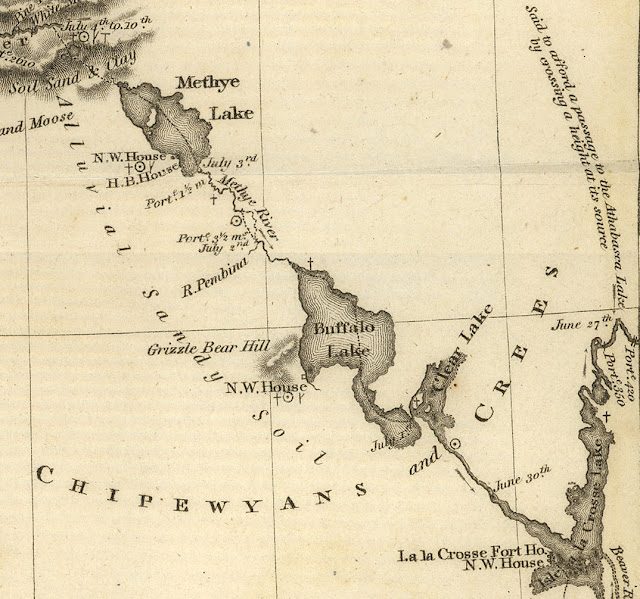
John Franklin's Coppermine Expedition map of 1819–1822 shows the fur trade route from Île-à-la-Crosse to Methye Portage

Peter Pond Lake was on the fur trade route to the Methye Portage which connected Eastern Canada to the Mackenzie River area. The lake is a long oval tending to the north-west. A peninsula which almost reaches the west shore divides it into Big Peter Pond (the northern two thirds) and Little Peter Pond. On the east side of Little Peter Pond a narrow isthmus separates it from Churchill Lake, the two forming a broad "V". The La Loche River, which drains Lac La Loche comes in from the north while the Dillon River, with the village of Dillon at its mouth, comes in from the west. The lake drains into Churchill Lake through the Kisis Channel at Buffalo Narrows. Originally called Big and Little Buffalo Lakes, it was renamed after Peter Pond in 1931. It is on Highway 155 which passes through Buffalo Narrows.

== Buffalo Narrows Sand Dunes Park ==
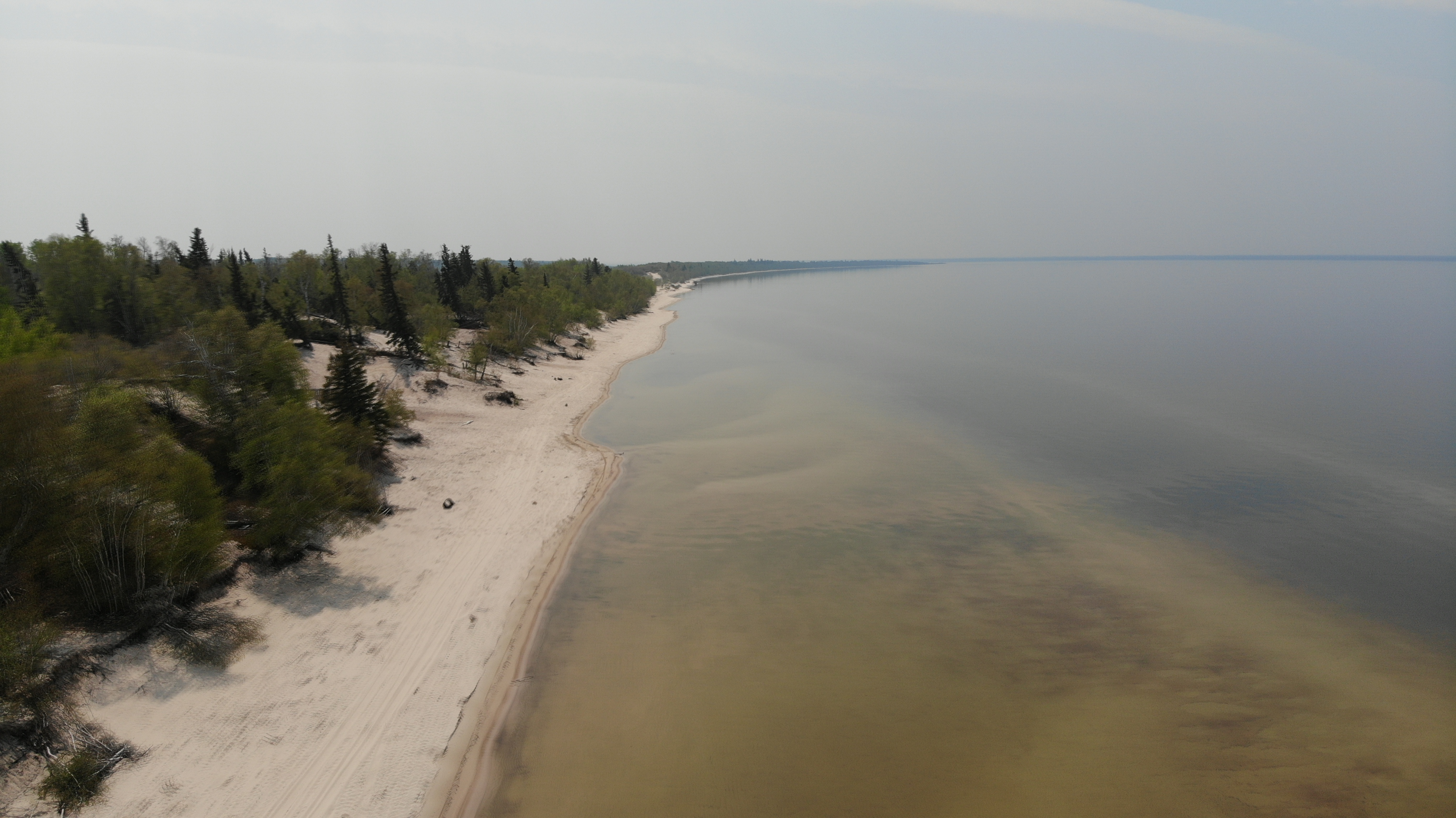
Buffalo Narrows Sand Dunes Park on Big Peter Pond Lake

Buffalo Narrows Sand Dunes Park (55.8834°N 108.6007°W) (formally Big Buffalo Beach Recreation Site), is a recreation site about 10 kilometres (6.2 mi) north of Buffalo Narrows. The park is 3,650 hectares (9,000 acres) and has a 10-kilometre (6.2 mi) long, white-sand beach and sand hills. The park is on a peninsula that separates "Big" and "Little" Peter Pond Lake. Amenities include a picnic area and change rooms. Access is from Highway 155. The park was originally Crown land and operated by the Saskatchewan government but was transferred to the local community of Buffalo Narrows in 2003. The sandy beaches are a nesting site for the endangered piping plover.

== Fish species ==
The lake's fish species include: walleye, sauger, yellow perch, northern pike, lake trout, lake whitefish, cisco, white sucker, longnose sucker, and burbot.

== See also ==
- List of lakes of Saskatchewan
- Tourism in Saskatchewan
