= Chipewyan language =

Athabaskan language of Canada

Chipewyan
- Dënesųłinë́
- Dëne Sųłıné Yatıé • ᑌᓀ ᓱᒼᕄᓀ ᔭᕠᐁ
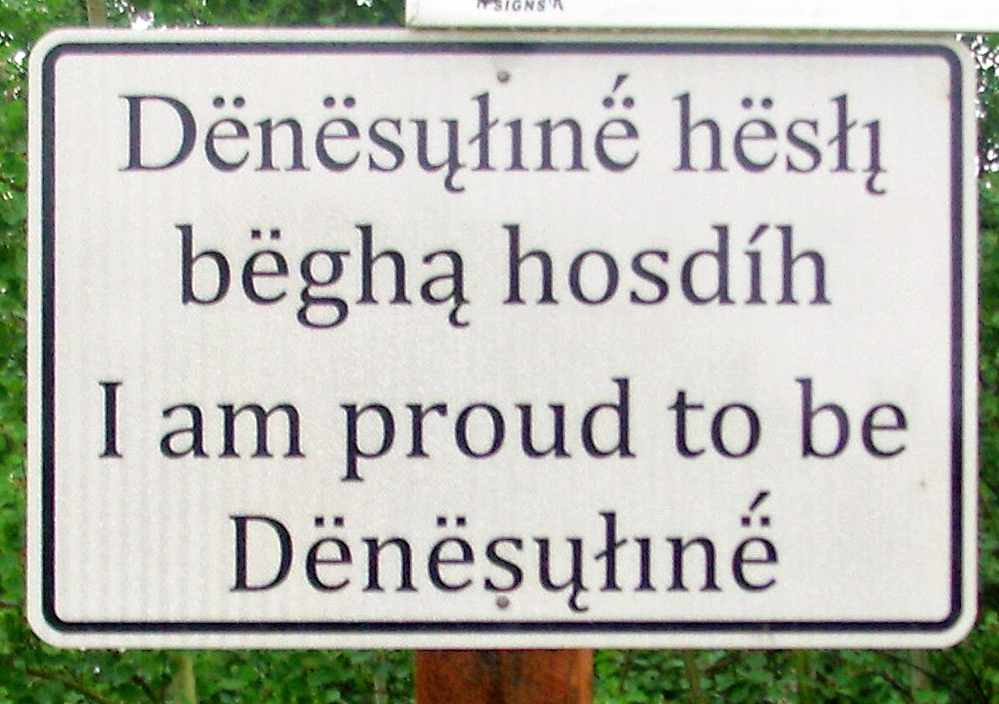
- Dënesųłinë́ sign at La Loche Airport
- Pronunciation: [tènɛ̀sũ̀ɬìné jàtʰìɛ́]
- Native to: Canada
- Region: Northern Alberta, Saskatchewan, Manitoba; southern Northwest Territories and Nunavut
- Ethnicity: 30,910 Chipewyan people (2016 census)
- Native speakers: 11,325, 41% of ethnic population (2016 census)
- Language family: Na-Dené: Athabaskan; Northern Athabaskan; Chipewyan
- Dialects: Dënesųłinë́ yatié; Dënedédliné yatié; Tthetsánót’iné yatié; Tetsǫ́t’iné yatié
- Writing system: NAPA; Dene Syllabics

Official status
- Official language in: Canada (Northwest Territories)

Language codes
- ISO 639-2: chp
- ISO 639-3: chp
- Glottolog: chip1261
- ELP: Dënesųłiné

- People: Dënesųłinë́
- Language: Dënesųłinë́ yatıé
- Country: Dënesųłinë́ nëné, Denendeh ᑌᓀᐣᑌᐧ

Chipewyan /ˌtʃɪpəˈwaɪən/ CHIP-ə-WY-ən or Dënesųłinë́ (ethnonym: Dënesųłinë́ yatié or Dëne Sųłıné Yatıé [tènɛ̀sũ̀ɬìné jàtʰìɛ́]), often simply called Dëne, is the language spoken by the Chipewyan people of northwestern Canada. It is categorized as part of the Northern Athabaskan language family. It has nearly 12,000 speakers in Canada, mostly in Saskatchewan, Alberta, Manitoba and the Northwest Territories. It has official status only in the Northwest Territories, alongside eight other aboriginal languages: Cree, Tlicho, Gwich'in, Inuktitut, Inuinnaqtun, Inuvialuktun, North Slavey and South Slavey.

Most Chipewyan people now use Dëne and Dënesųłinë́ to refer to themselves as a people and to their language, respectively. The Saskatchewan communities of Fond-du-Lac, Black Lake, Wollaston Lake and La Loche are among these.

== Geographic distribution and speakers ==
Villages in Canada with a Dënësųłinë́-speaking population
Fifteen communities in Canada with Dënesųłinë́ populations. Larger dots are villages with over 1,000 speakers.

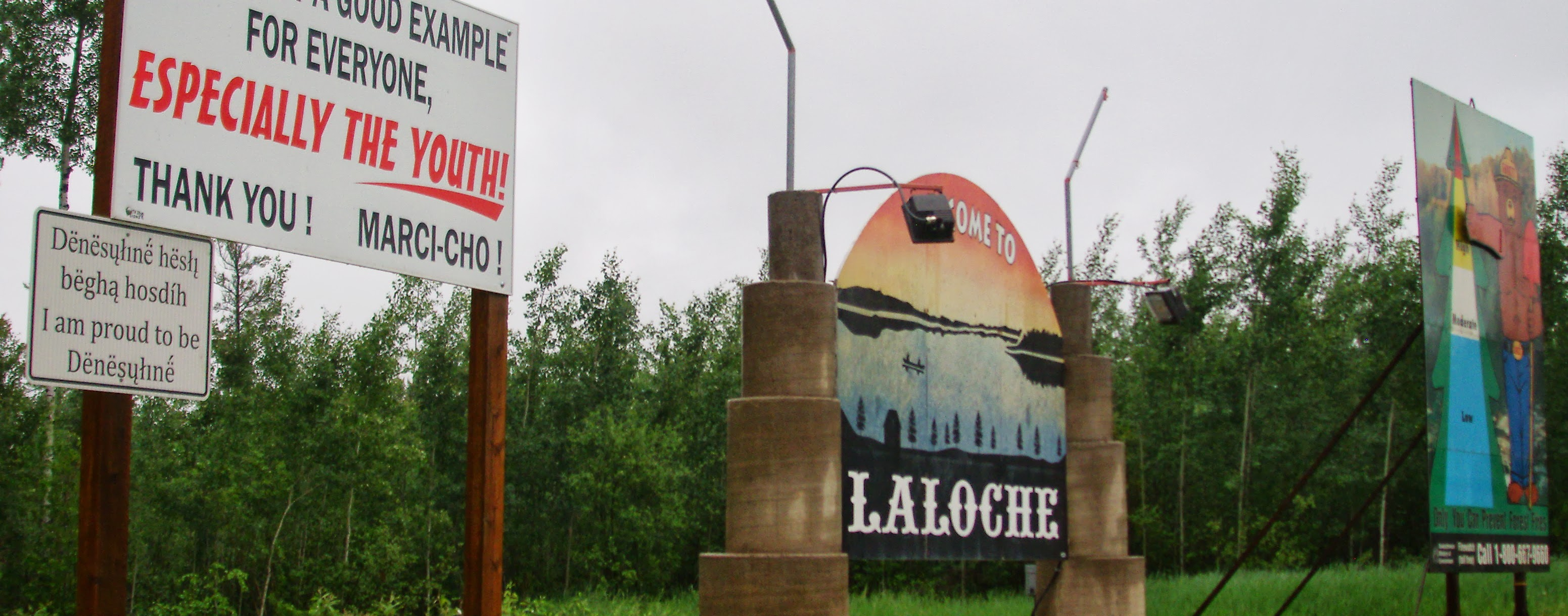
Welcome signs by the La Loche Airport

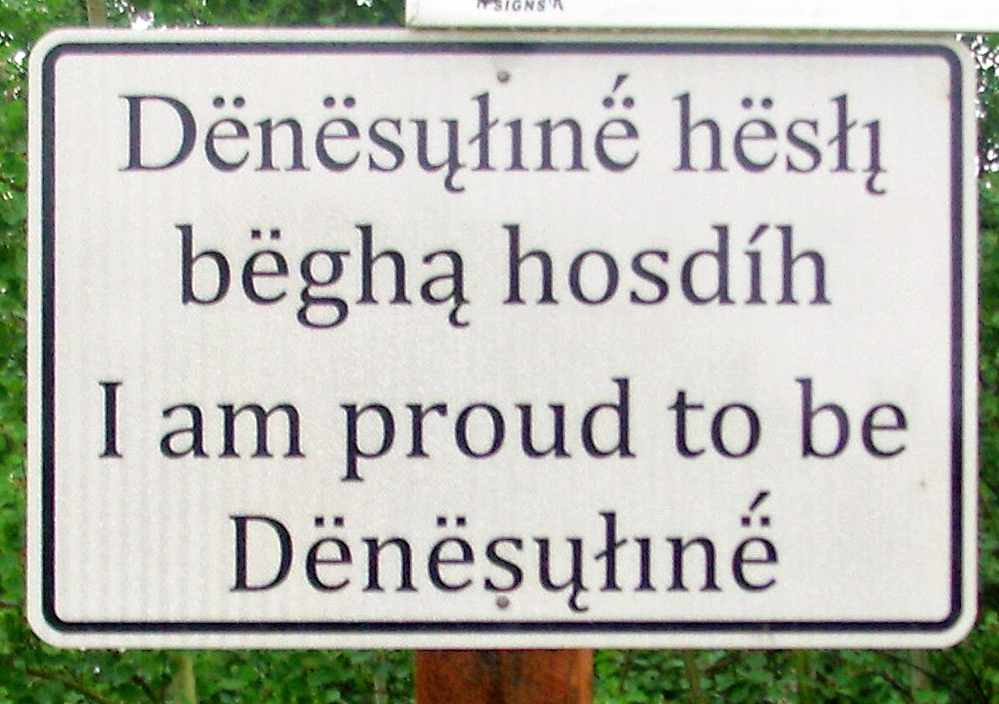
Close-up of Dënesųłinë́ and English sign

In the 2011 Canada Census 11,860 people chose Dënesųłinë́ as their mother tongue. 70.6% were located in Saskatchewan and 15.2% were located in Alberta.

- 7,955 were in Saskatchewan
- 1,680 were in Alberta (the Dene Tha' First Nation a Dëne/South Slavey group (approximately 1000 people) are included in this total)
- 1,005 were in Manitoba
- 450 were in the Northwest Territories
- 70 were in British Columbia
- 45 were in the Yukon
- 20 were in Ontario

Not all were from the historical Chipewyan regions south and east of Great Slave Lake. Approximately 11,000 of those who chose Dënesųłinë́ as their mother tongue in 2011 are Dëne/Chipewyan with 7,955 (72%) in Saskatchewan, 1,005 (9%) in Manitoba, 510 plus urban dwellers in Alberta and 260 plus urban dwellers in the Northwest Territories. The communities within the Dëne traditional areas are shown below:

=== Saskatchewan ===
The Dënesųłinë́-speaking communities of Saskatchewan are located in the northern half of the province. The area from the upper Churchill River west of Pinehouse Lake all the way north to Lake Athabasca and from Lake Athabasca east to the north end of Reindeer Lake is home to 7410 people who chose Dënesųłinë́ as their mother tongue in 2011.

Prince Albert had 265 residents who chose Dënesųłinë́ as their mother tongue in 2011, Saskatoon had 165, the La Ronge Population Centre had 55 and Meadow Lake had 30.

3,050 were in the Lake Athabasca-Fond du Lac River area including Black Lake and Wollaston Lake in the communities of:

- Fond-du-Lac 705 out of 874 residents chose Dënesųłinë́ as their mother tongue in 2011.
- Stony Rapids 140 out of 243 residents chose Dënesųłinë́ as their mother tongue in 2011.
- Black Lake (Chicken 224) 1040 out of 1070 residents chose Dënesųłinë́ as their mother tongue in 2011.
- Uranium City (hamlet)
- Camsell Portage (hamlet)
- Wollaston Lake
- Wollaston Post (Lac La Hache 220) 1165 out of 1251 residents chose Dënesųłinë́ as their mother tongue in 2011.

3,920 were in the upper Churchill River area including Peter Pond Lake, Churchill Lake, Lac La Loche, Descharme Lake, Garson Lake and Turnor Lake in the communities of:

- La Loche 2,300 out 2,611 chose Dënesųłinë́ as their mother tongue in 2011.
- Clearwater River 720 out of 778 residents chose Dënesųłinë́ as their mother tongue in 2011.
- Black Point (hamlet)
- Bear Creek (hamlet)
- Garson Lake (hamlet)
- Descharme Lake (hamlet)
- Turnor Lake
- Turnor Lake (Birch Narrows First Nation) 70 out of 419 residents chose Dënesųłinë́ as their mother tongue in 2011.
- Dillon (Buffalo River Dene Nation) 330 out of 764 residents chose Dënesųłinë́ as their mother tongue in 2011.
- St. George's Hill, Saskatchewan 85 out of 100 residents chose Dënesųłinë́ as their mother tongue in 2011.
- Michel Village 55 out of 66 residents chose Dënesųłinë́ as their mother tongue in 2011.
- Buffalo Narrows 35 out of 1153 residents chose Dënesųłinë́ as their mother tongue in 2011.
- Patuanak 35 out of 64 residents chose Dënesųłinë́ as their mother tongue in 2011.
- Patuanak (Wapachewunak 1920) 265 out of 482 residents chose Dënesųłinë́ as their mother tongue in 2011.
- Beauval (La Plonge 192) 25 out of 115 residents chose Dënesųłinë́ as their mother tongue in 2011.

=== Manitoba ===
Two isolated communities are in northern Manitoba. The two Manitoban communities use Dënesųłinë́ syllabics to write their language.

- Lac Brochet (197 A) 720 out of 816 residents chose Dënesųłinë́ as their mother tongue in 2011.
- Tadoule Lake (Churchill 1) 170 out of 321 residents chose Dënesųłinë́ as their mother tongue in 2011.

=== Alberta ===
The Wood Buffalo-Cold Lake Economic Region in the north eastern portion of Alberta from Fort Chipewyan to the Cold Lake area has the following communities. 510 residents of this region chose Dënesųłinë́ as their mother tongue in 2011.

- Fort Chipewyan 45 out of 847 residents chose Dënesųłinë́ as their mother tongue in 2011.
- Fort McKay 30 out of 562 residents chose Dënesųłinë́ as their mother tongue in 2011.
- Janvier (Janvier 194) 145 out of 295 residents chose Dënesųłinë́ as their mother tongue in 2011.
- Janvier South 35 out of 104 residents chose Dënesųłinë́ as their mother tongue in 2011.
- Cold Lake 149 105 out of 594 residents chose Dënesųłinë́ as their mother tongue in 2011.
- Cold Lake 149 B, Alberta 25 out of 149 residents chose Dënesųłinë́ as their mother tongue in 2011.

=== Northwest Territories ===
Three communities are located south of Great Slave Lake in Region 5. 260 residents of Region 5 chose Dënesųłinë́ as their mother tongue in 2011.

- Fort Smith 30 out of 2093 residents chose Dënesųłinë́ as their mother tongue in 2011.
- Fort Resolution 95 out of 474 residents chose Dënesųłinë́ as their mother tongue in 2011.
- Lutselk'e 120 out of 295 residents chose Dënesųłinë́ as their mother tongue in 2011.

== Phonology ==
=== Consonants ===
The 39 consonants of Dënesųłinë́:

		Bilabial	Inter- dental	Dental			Post- alveolar	Dorsal		Glottal
		Bilabial	Inter- dental	plain	sibilant	lateral	Post- alveolar	plain	labial	Glottal
Nasal		m ⟨m⟩		n ⟨n⟩						
Plosive/ Affricate	voiced	b ⟨b⟩	dð ⟨ddh⟩	d ⟨d⟩	dz ⟨dz⟩	dɮ ⟨dl⟩	dʒ ⟨j⟩	ɡ ⟨g⟩	ɡʷ ⟨gw⟩	
Plosive/ Affricate	aspirated		tθʰ ⟨tth⟩	tʰ ⟨t⟩	tsʰ ⟨ts⟩	tɬʰ ⟨tł⟩	tʃʰ ⟨ch⟩	kʰ ⟨k⟩	kʷʰ ⟨kw⟩	
Plosive/ Affricate	ejective		tθʼ ⟨tthʼ⟩	tʼ ⟨tʼ⟩	tsʼ ⟨tsʼ⟩	tɬʼ ⟨tłʼ⟩	tʃʼ ⟨chʼ⟩	kʼ ⟨kʼ⟩	kʷʼ ⟨kwʼ⟩	ʔ ⟨’⟩
Fricative	voiceless		θ ⟨th⟩		s ⟨s⟩	ɬ ⟨ł⟩	ʃ ⟨sh⟩	χ ⟨hh⟩	χʷ ⟨hhw⟩	h ⟨h⟩
Fricative	voiced		ð ⟨dh⟩		z ⟨z⟩	ɮ ⟨l⟩	ʒ ⟨zh⟩	ʁ ⟨gh⟩	ʁʷ ⟨ghw⟩	
Liquid				ɾ ⟨r⟩		l ⟨l⟩		j ⟨y⟩	w ⟨w⟩	

The interdental series of ⟨ddh⟩, ⟨tth⟩, ⟨tthʼ⟩, ⟨th⟩, and ⟨dh⟩ corresponds to ⟨s⟩-like sibilants in other Na-Dené languages.

The unaspirated (plain) plosives and affricates are voiced. This contrasts with certain other Athabaskan languages, such as Navajo, where these consonants are voiceless and unaspirated (tenuis), though written with the voiced letters.

=== Vowels ===
Dënesųłinë́ has vowels of six differing qualities.

	Front	Central	Back
Close	i ⟨i⟩		u ⟨u⟩
Close-mid	e ⟨ë⟩		o ⟨o⟩
Open-mid	ɛ ⟨e⟩		
Open		a ⟨a⟩	

Most vowels can be either

- oral or nasal. Nasals are marked with an ogonek in the orthography: ⟨ą ę ę̈ į ǫ ų⟩.
- short or long

As a result, Dënesųłinë́ has 24 phonemic vowels:

		Front		Central		Back	
		short	long	short	long	short	long
Close	oral	i	iː			u	uː
Close	nasal	ĩ	ĩː			ũ	ũː
Close-mid	oral	e	eː			o	oː
Close-mid	nasal	ẽ	ẽː			õ	õː
Open-mid	oral	ɛ	ɛː				
Open-mid	nasal	ɛ̃	ɛ̃ː				
Open	oral			a	aː		
Open	nasal			ã	ãː		

Dënesųłinë́ also has 9 oral and nasal diphthongs of the form vowel + /j/.

	Front		Central		Back	
	oral	nasal	oral	nasal	oral	nasal
Close					uj	ũj
Mid	ej	ẽj	əj		oj	õj
Open			aj	ãj		

=== Tone ===
Dënesųłinë́ has two tones:

- high (marked with acute accents in the orthography: ⟨á é ë́ ı́ ó ú⟩)
- low

== See also ==
- Chipewyan syllabics
- Chipewyan people

== Bibliography ==
- Cook, Eung-Do (2004). A Grammar of Dëne Su̜łiné (Chipewyan). Winnipeg: Algonquian and Iroquoian Linguistics. ISBN 0-921064-17-9. OCLC 54906360.
- Cook, Eung-Do (2006). "The Patterns of Consonantal Acquisition and Change in Chipewyan (Dëne Sųłiné)". International Journal of American Linguistics. 72 (2): 236. doi:10.1086/507166. S2CID 143567603.
- De Reuse, Willem (2006). "A Grammar of Dëne Sųłiné (Chipewyan) By Eung-Do Cook". International Journal of American Linguistics. 72 (4): 535. doi:10.1086/513060.
- Elford, Leon W. (2001). Dene sųłiné yati ditł'ísé = Dene sųłiné reader. Prince Albert, SK: Northern Canada Mission Distributors. ISBN 1-896968-28-7.
- Gessner, Suzanne (2005). "Properties of Tone in Dëne Sųłiné". In Hargus, Sharon; Rice, Keren (eds.). Athabaskan prosody. Amsterdam Studies in the Theory and History of Linguistic Science. Vol. 269. John Benjamins. pp. 229–248. doi:10.1075/cilt.269.13ges. ISBN 9789027247834.
- Goddard, Pliny (1912). "Analysis of Cold Lake Dialect, Chipewyan". Anthropological Papers of the American Museum of Natural History. 10 (2): 67–170.
- Li, Fang-Kuei (1946). "Chipewyan". In Osgood, C.; Hoijer, H. (eds.). Linguistic Structures of Native America. The Viking Fund Publications in Anthropology. Vol. 6. New York: Viking Fund. pp. 398–423. OCLC 7198204. (Reprinted 1963, 1965, 1967, & 1971, New York: Johnson Reprint Corp.).
- McDonough, Joyce; Wood, Valerie (2008). "The stop contrasts of the Athabaskan languages" (PDF). Journal of Phonetics. 36 (3): 427–449. doi:10.1016/j.wocn.2007.11.001. ISSN 0095-4470.
