= Saskatchewan Highway 966 =

Provincial highway in Saskatchewan, Canada

Highway 966

Route information
- Maintained by Ministry of Highways and Infrastructure
- Length: 30 km (19 mi)

Major junctions
- East end: Highway 905 near Stony Rapids
- West end: dead end

Location
- Country: Canada
- Province: Saskatchewan

Highway system
- Provincial highways in Saskatchewan
| ← Highway 965 | → Highway 967 |

Highway 966 is a provincial highway in the Canadian province of Saskatchewan. It runs from Highway 905 (former Highway 964) near Stony Rapids until a dead end near Riou Lake. It is about 30 kilometres (19 mi) long.

It is cut off from the rest of the province for part of the year, except in winter when a seasonal road forms along Highway 905, leading to the south.

== See also ==
- Roads in Saskatchewan
- Transportation in Saskatchewan
