= Buffalo River Dene Nation =

First Nations band in Saskatchewan, Canada

- Band No. 398
- People: Dene
- Treaty: Treaty 10
- Headquarters: Dillon
- Province: Saskatchewan

Land
- Other reserve: Buffalo River Dene Nation 193
- Land area: 82.597 km^{2} (31.891 sq mi)

Population (2019)
- On reserve: 798
- Off reserve: 701
- Total population: 1499

Government
- Chief: Elmer Campbell

Tribal Council
- Meadow Lake Tribal Council

The Buffalo River Dene Nation (Chipewyan: Ɂëjëre dësché) is a Dene First Nations band government in Saskatchewan, Canada. The band's main community, Dillon, is located on the western shore of Peter Pond Lake at the mouth of the Dillon River, and is accessed by Highway 925 from Highway 155.

== History ==
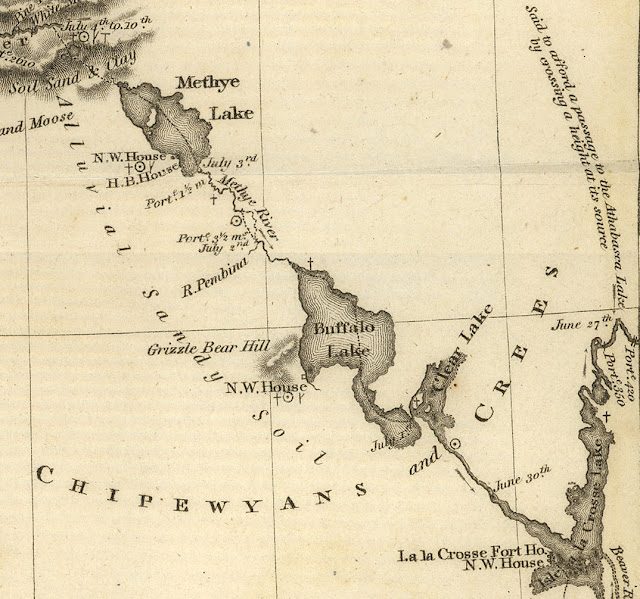
John Franklin's Coppermine Expedition map of 1819–1822 showing the fur trade route from Île-à-la-Crosse to Methye Portage

The North West Company had a post near Dillon in 1790. It was called Lac des Boeufs Post (Buffalo Lake Post). The Hudson's Bay Company had a post nearby in 1791.

In 1819–1820 Sir John Franklin noted the position of the North West Company Post on Buffalo Lake (Peter Pond Lake) where Buffalo River (Dillon River) is located. (see map)

The first post office opened under the name of Buffalo River in 1926 and closed in 1929. In 1954 the post office was re-opened under the name of Dillon.

=== Name changes ===
In 1932 the name of the community was officially changed from Buffalo River to Dillon, the name of the river was changed from Buffalo River to Dillon River and Buffalo Lake was renamed Peter Pond Lake. A lake on the Dillon River just west of Vermette Lake also received its official name of Dillon Lake in 1932.

The source of the Dillon River is in Alberta east of Lake Winefred near co-ordinates 55.50°N 110.259°W.

== Buffalo River Dene Nation ==
Buffalo River Dene Nation has a total registered membership of 1,273 with 689 members residing on-reserve and 584 members residing at locations off-reserve as of May, 2012 The total territory of the Buffalo River Dene Nation 193 is 8259.70 hectares.

== Demographics ==
Canada census – Buffalo River Dene Nation community profile

	2021	2011
Population	842 (+7.5% from 2016)	764 (+3.1% from 2006)
Land area	83.63 km^{2} (32.29 sq mi)	86.32 km^{2} (33.33 sq mi)
Population density	10.1/km^{2} (26/sq mi)	8.9/km^{2} (23/sq mi)
Median age	27.8 (M: 26.8, F: 29.2)	25.6 (M: 26.4, F: 25.0)
Private dwellings	297 (total) 271 (occupied)	245 (total)
Median household income	$66,500

References: 2021 2011

== See also ==
- Denesuline language
- Denesuline
