= Rapid River (Cree River tributary) =

River in Saskatchewan, Canada

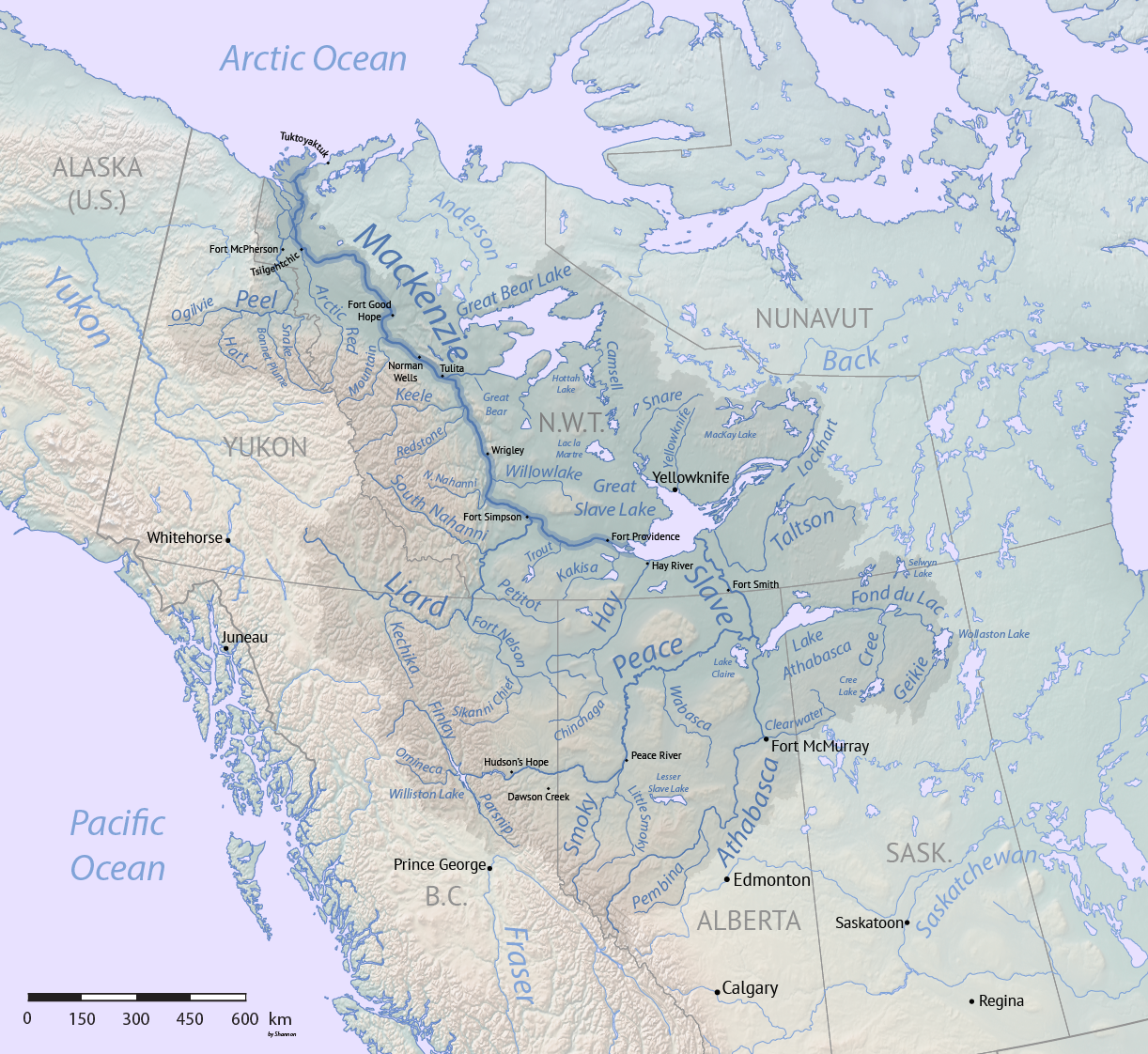
- Map of the Mackenzie River watershed

- Location of the mouth in Saskatchewan Rapid River (Cree River tributary) (Canada)

Location
- Country: Canada
- Province: Saskatchewan

Physical characteristics
- Source: Unnamed lake
  - coordinates: 57°51′00″N 105°12′13″W
  - elevation: 572 m (1,877 ft)
- Mouth: Cree River
  - coordinates: 58°18′47″N 105°48′09″W
  - elevation: 330 m (1,080 ft)

Basin features
- Tributaries
  - left: Arnold River

The Rapid River is a river in northern Saskatchewan, Canada. It is part of the Mackenzie River drainage basin.

== Hydrology ==
The Rapid River begins at an unnamed lake at an elevation of 572 metres (1,877 ft). It travels north to Kirsch Lake at an elevation of 498 metres (1,634 ft), where it takes in several unnamed tributaries, including one from the left arriving from Halliday Lake. The river continues to Parker Lake at an elevation of 413 metres (1,355 ft) where it takes in the left tributary Arnold River. It then reaches its mouth at the Cree River at an elevation of 330 metres (1,083 ft). The river's waters flow via the Cree River, the Fond du Lac River and the Mackenzie River to the Arctic Ocean.

== See also ==
- List of rivers of Saskatchewan
