= Wolf Lake (Alberta) =

Lake in Municipal District of Bonnyville No. 87, Alberta, Canada

- Location within Alberta
- Location: Bonnyville No. 87, Alberta
- Coordinates: 54°41′39″N 110°57′21″W
- Primary inflows: Wolf River
- Primary outflows: Wolf River
- Catchment area: 693 km^{2} (268 sq mi)
- Basin countries: Canada
- Max. length: 6.2 km (3.9 mi)
- Max. width: 9.7 km (6.0 mi)
- Surface area: 31.5 km^{2} (12.2 sq mi)
- Average depth: 9.2 m (30 ft)
- Max. depth: 38.3 m (126 ft)
- Surface elevation: 597 m (1,959 ft)

Wolf Lake is a lake in the Hudson Bay drainage basin located in the Municipal District of Bonnyville No. 87 in census division No. 12, Alberta, Canada. Its primary inflow and outflow is the Wolf River, which flows via the Sand River, Beaver River and Churchill River to Hudson Bay.
