= St. George's Hill, Saskatchewan =

Northern hamlet in Saskatchewan, Canada

Coordinates: 55°52′48″N 108°57′45″W

Location of St. George's Hill in Saskatchewan

St. George's Hill is a northern hamlet in the Canadian prairie province of Saskatchewan. It is located where the Highway 925 spans the Dillon River about 10 kilometres south of Dillon. The mayor is Donna Janvier.

== Demographics ==
In the 2021 Census of Population conducted by Statistics Canada, St. George's Hill had a population of 77 living in 26 of its 30 total private dwellings, a change of -41.2% from its 2016 population of 131. With a land area of 1.68 km^{2} (0.65 sq mi), it had a population density of 45.8/km^{2} (118.7/sq mi) in 2021.

In 2011, 85 residents used Dene (Denesuline) as their mother tongue in 2011.

== See also ==
- List of communities in Northern Saskatchewan
- List of communities in Saskatchewan
