= Saskatchewan Highway 964 =

Former provincial highway in Saskatchewan, Canada

Highway 964

Route information
- Maintained by Ministry of Highways and Infrastructure
- Length: 18 km (11 mi)
- History: Replaced by Hwy 905

Major junctions
- South end: Black Lake
- North end: Stony Rapids

Location
- Country: Canada
- Province: Saskatchewan

Highway system
- Provincial highways in Saskatchewan
← Highway 963	→ Highway 965

Highway 964 was a provincial highway in the Canadian province of Saskatchewan. The highway ran from Black Lake to Stony Rapids. It was approximately 18 kilometres (11 mi) long.

In the late 1990s, a winter road was constructed from Black Lake to Points North Landing; it was designated as being part of Highway 905. Highway 964 was absorbed and redesignated as Highway 905.

== See also ==
- Roads in Saskatchewan
- Transportation in Saskatchewan
