= Lakeland Provincial Park and Recreation Area =

Provincial park in Alberta, Canada

Lakeland Provincial Park
- IUCN category IV (habitat/species management area)
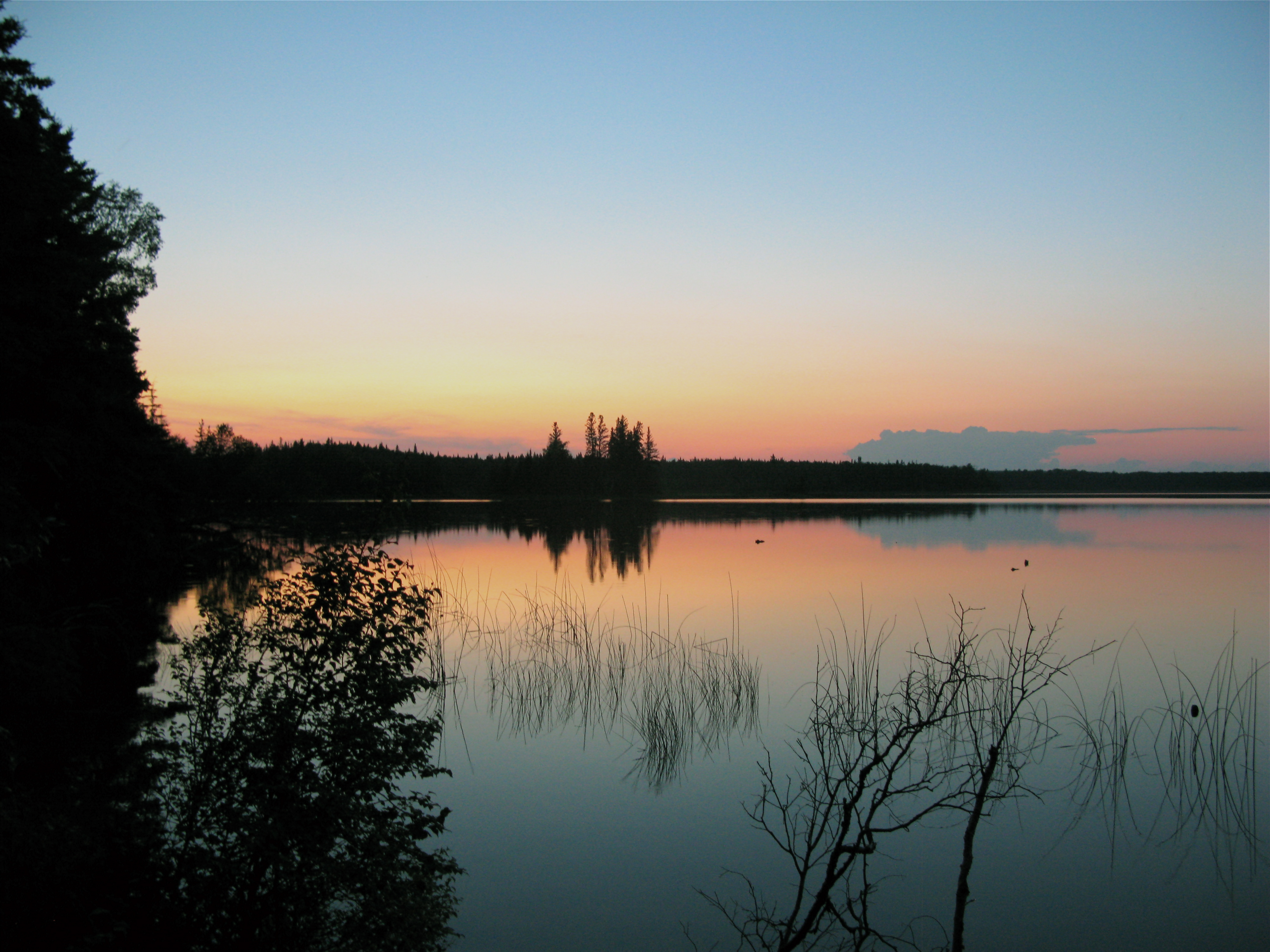
- Kinnaird Lake at Sunset

- Location within Alberta
- Location: Lac La Biche County, Alberta, Canada
- Nearest city: Lac La Biche, Edmonton
- Coordinates: 54°48′33″N 111°31′09″W
- Area: 596.9 km^{2} (230.5 sq mi)
- Established: January 16, 1992
- Governing body: Alberta Tourism, Parks and Recreation

Lakeland Provincial Park and Lakeland Provincial Recreation Area are located east of Lac La Biche, Alberta, Canada, in Lac La Biche County.

The park contains numerous lakes, such as Kinnaird, Jackson, McGuffin, Dabbs, Shaw, and Blackett, as well as many other smaller waterbodies. The Lakeland Provincial Recreation Area contains Pinehurst Lake, Seibert, Touchwood and Ironwood Lakes.

== Park planning and development ==
=== Planning the provincial park ===
Discussions of Lakeland Provincial Park were ongoing for decades before the park was designated in 1992. During the 1960s and 1970s the region was under consideration as a public recreation area. Increasing use led to the construction of small-scale facilities by the provincial Department of Highways and the Forest Service. In 1972 a park reservation was created from Lac La Biche to Cold Lake, which includes the areas now in Lakeland Provincial Park. By the late 1980s, the existing facilities were facing substantial use pressures. Reports from the provincial government described the recreational infrastructure as "minimal" and suggested improving the "limited road access". Discussing the park's potential, the then Deputy Minister of Renewable Resources stated:

The proposed Pinehurst-Seibert-Touchwood Park has by far the greatest potential for a wide variety of water based recreation activities in Alberta. The excellent beaches on the larger lakes [Pinehurst, Seibert, Touchwood, and Spencer] provide focal points for intensive use camping, boating, swimming and fishing. These lakes have carrying capacities for large numbers of people. The Jackson-Kinnaird-Blackett area has natural potential for wilderness canoeing, hiking, and sportfishing. The Sand River and its tributaries have very good potential for canoe and trail routes. The upland areas are prime wildlife habitat and provide abundant opportunities for dispersed recreation such as viewing, photography, hiking, nature study and hunting.

In 1975 a government task force was struck to provide Premier Peter Lougheed with management options pertaining to resource conflicts in the area. The Minister of Lands and Forests, Allan Warrack felt a formal recommendation to establish the park could be submitted for government consideration in 1976.

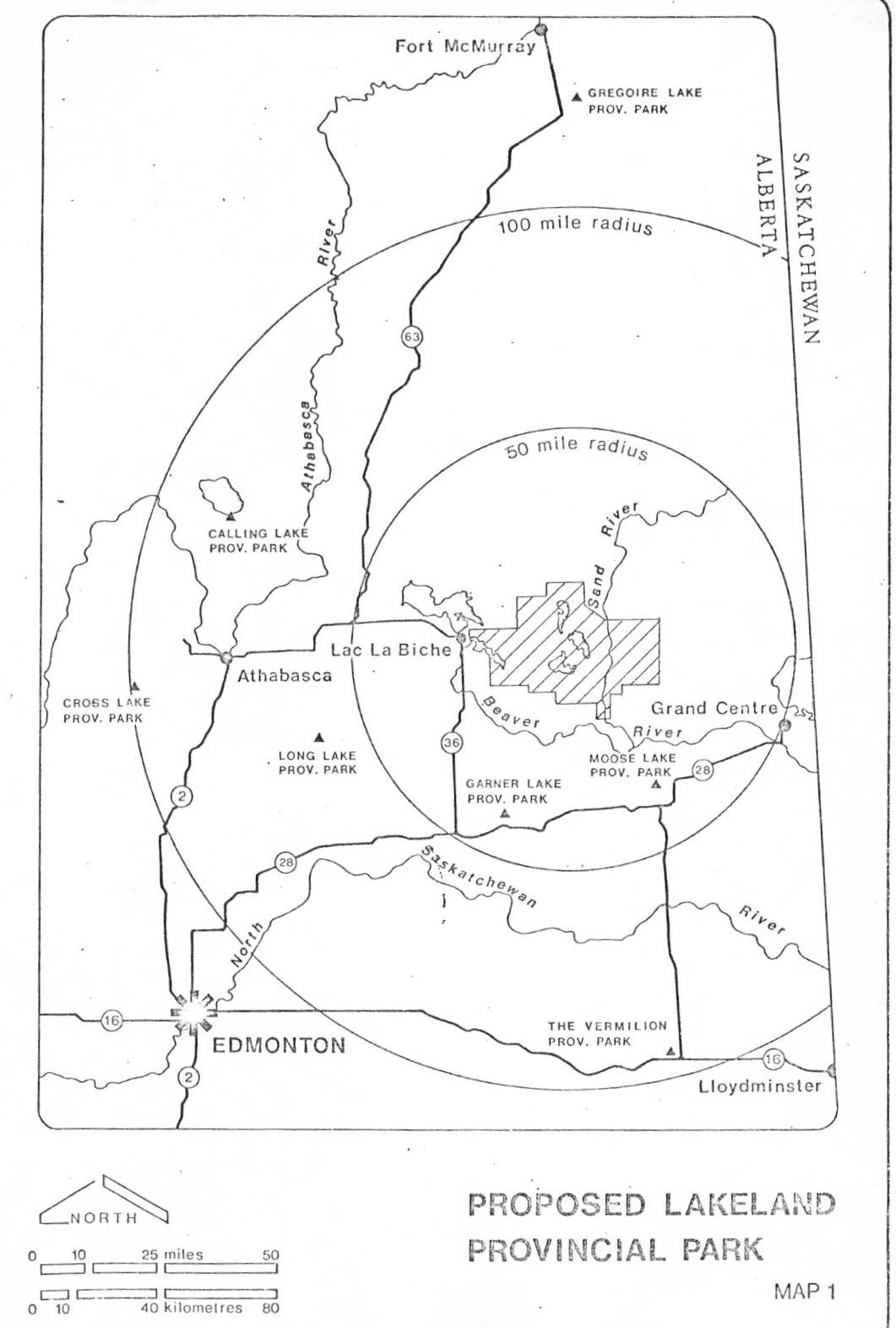
Nearby population centres - map from Government of Alberta planning documents

=== Announcing the park ===
One of the most vocal proponents of the proposed park was the nearby town of Lac La Biche. The town felt significant job growth and tourist revenue would stem from the creation of the park. The public announcement, in January 1992, that the park proposal had been accepted garnered positive reaction from the community. Mayor Tom Maccagno and MLA for Athabasca-Lac La Biche Mike Cardinal jointly made the announcement at a local fish fry, which was being held to celebrate the creation of Lakeland. At the announcement, the Honourable Mike Cardinal announced the park could attract "up to one million tourists annually".

=== Developing the park ===
The facilities at Lakeland Provincial Park were constructed in part by First Nation and Métis prison inmates. During the early 1990s the Government of Alberta was experimenting with changes to the criminal justice system that would bring more Métis and First Nation individuals into policing and legal roles, including judges and justices of the peace. Another component of this program included putting convicted First Nation and Métis inmates to work. An inmate camp was constructed at Lac La Biche, and prisoners were used to construct trails and facilities in the park.

== Hydrology ==
=== Drainage basins ===
The Lakeland area straddles two drainage basins, and is thus drained by two major river systems, the Athabasca and the Beaver-Churchill. The Athabasca River drainage basin is the second largest drainage basin in Alberta. It drains 5 of the major lakes in the north-west section of the Lakeland area, including Blackett, Dabbs, Kinnaird, and McGuffin lakes, which all flow into Jackson Lake. Jackson Lake is drained by Gull Creek, which ultimately flows into the Piche River, which in turn joins the Owl River, then Lac La Biche, the La Biche River, and ultimately, into the Athabasca River and on to the Arctic Ocean.

The other major lakes, in the south-east section of the Lakeland area, are in the Sand River sub-basin. Spencer and Seibert Lakes are drained by a small unnamed creek, while Punk Creek drains Pinehurst Lake. Water from Touchwood Lake also enters Pinehurst Lake through a small creek. Water from the area flows into the Sand River from Helena Lake, into Horne Lake, then Ironwood Lake, and in turn Rich Lake. The Sand River enters the Beaver River and flows to Hudson Bay through the Churchill system.

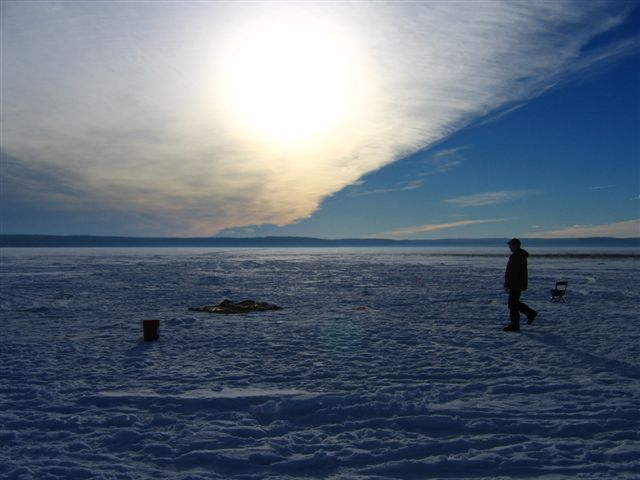
Pinehurst Lake in winter

=== Lakes of Lakeland Provincial Park ===
Black Duck Lake is translated from the Cree Kuskutesip Sagahegan. It is unclear on the exact species of duck the name refers to. The lake often ices over in early October, and is thought to be too shallow to contain fish.

Blackett Lake is at the same elevation as nearby Kinnaird and Jackson Lakes, and is connected to the other bodies of water by small streams. Local First Nation groups and early settlers understood and conceptualized the three lakes as one large body of water. The Blackett name is likely taken from a group of early settlers, who may have been fleeing legal trouble stemming from the Yukon Gold Rush.

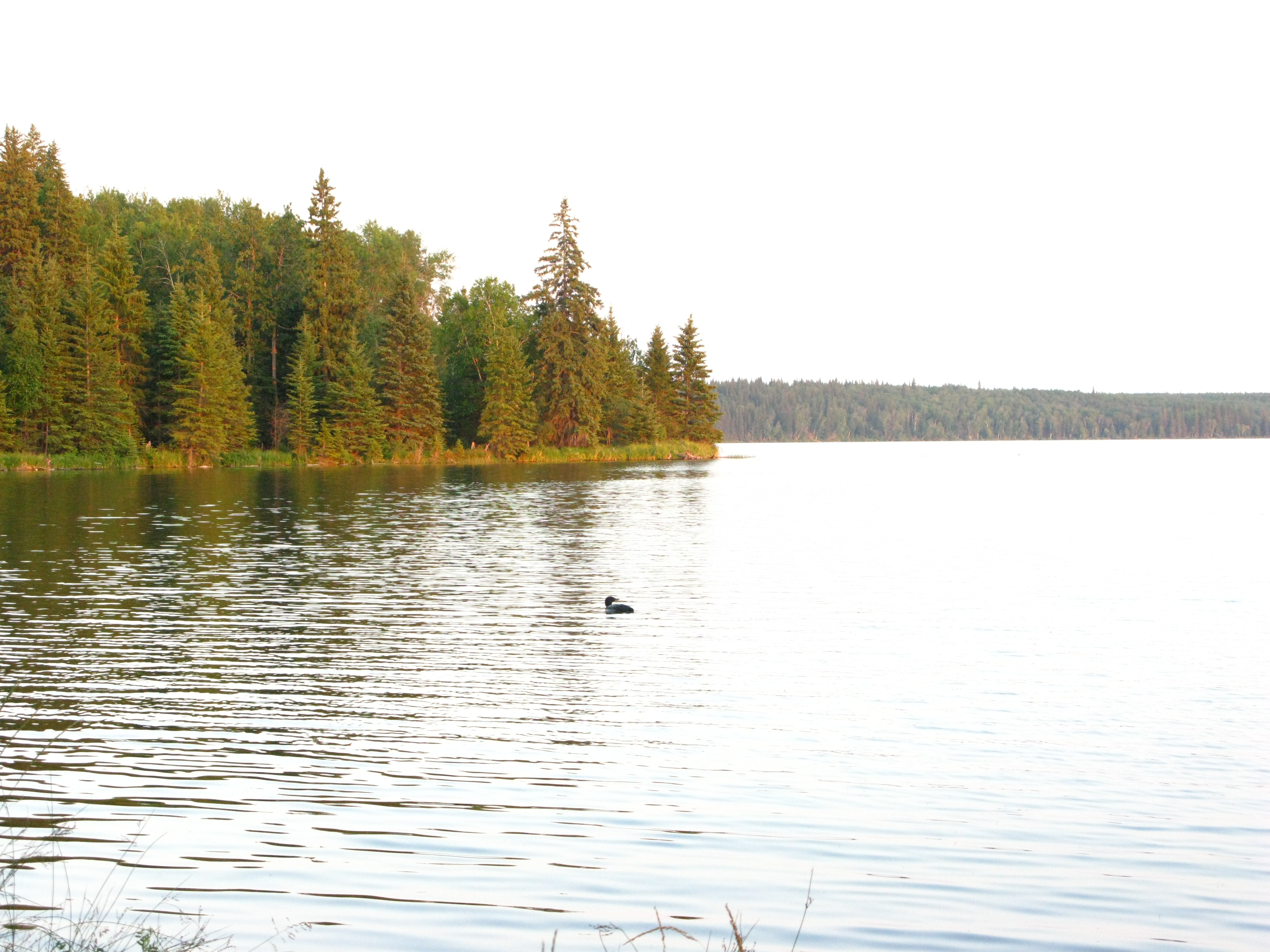
Loon on Kinnaird Lake

Brown Lake is one of the least accessible, and seldom visited, lakes in the park. No fish currently inhabit the lake, although local memory indicates there may have once been a self-sustaining population. Brown Lake is quite shallow, and possibly only connected to nearby lakes through groundwater. At high water levels, Brown Lake may spill into adjoining Helena Lake. Little information exists on the origin of the "Brown Lake" name, although it is suspected to not be of local origin.

Dabbs Lake is named after Pilot Officer H. E. Dabbs, who died during World War II. The Cree name for the lake is Hamschigosik Sagahegan, translated as Little Island Lake. The shoreline of Dabbs Lake is dominated by white spruce, and the lake is connected to Kinnaird Lake via a small creek. Dabbs Lake is divided into two basins, with a maximum depth of 12 feet (3.7 m) in the deeper, north basin.

Jackson Lake has relatively high shores, dominated by cattails, willows, black spruce, aspen poplar, and white spruce vegetation. The lake is named after a family with the surname Jackson, originally from North Dakota, that homesteaded on nearby Fork Lake in the 1930s. Likely, members of that family trapped on Jackson Lake in the winter.

Jackson Lake, as well as Kinnaird and Blackett Lakes, are at the same altitude and connected by narrow bodies of water or small streams. Collectively, the three lakes had the Cree name Maniwansik. Similarly, commercial fishermen in the 1920s and 1930s referred to the lakes collectively as Egg Lakes. It is believed that Jackson and Kinnaird Lakes formed the basin of a single, larger lake, until a pressure ridge was pushed up by ice over an existing sandbar.

Kinnaird Lake is one of the largest lakes within the provincial park. It was named after D. G. Kinnaird, a homesteader in the region. The name was made official in 1921, although it may have originally appeared as Canard. Kinnaird Lake has been commercially fished since the 1920s. There is significant algae and summer plant growth in Jackson Lake, with thin shorelines and very tall grasses.

McGuffin Lake is one of the smaller lakes in the park. It is named after Squadron Leader W. C. McGuffin, of Calgary, who was killed during World War II. The Cree name for the lake was Kamshttigowa, while local residents had previously called McGuffin Lake Island Lake. McGuffin Lake drains into Jackson Lake via a small creek.

Shaw Lake is one of the smallest lakes within Lakeland Provincial Park. It is the only lake with a road-accessible public recreation area on its shores. Shaw Lake was likely named after J. P. Shaw, a commercial fisherman from the area active in the 1930s. The lake has the characteristics of a large slough, with marshy shores and two distinct basins. Shaw Lake appears to have once been commercially fished, although is now subject to frequent winterkill.

Snake Lake is less than a quarter section in total area, although significant number of northern pike are found in the lake. There are three competing theories on the origin of the "Snake Lake" name. The first posits that local trappers frequently saw garter snakes on the lakeshore. The second argues that the northern pike in the lake rarely exceeded three to four pounds, and their long sinuous bodies resembled those of snakes. The third theory suggests early visitors to the lake encountered very large leeches, which resembled snakes. The lake is also known as Zig-Zag Lake.

=== Lakes of Lakeland Provincial Recreation Area ===
Ironwood Lake is a medium-sized lake in the southeast corner of the recreation area. The name Ironwood is not of local origin. Prior to the official naming of Ironwood in 1951 it was referred to as Rocky Island Lake. Cree names for the lake included Kamistigwapskasik Sagahegan meaning Little Stony Island Lake or Chipay Sagahegan, meaning Skeleton Lake. Nearby Helena, Horne, and Frenchman Lakes empty into Ironwood, which itself empties into Rich Lake and then into the Beaver River. Ironwood Lake is a key point for many spawning fish in the area.

The west, north, and east shores of Ironwood Lake are dominated by large hills, while the southern shore features two large estuaries. The lake water varies significantly in colour and composition throughout the year, ranging from cloudy to clear. The bottom of Ironwood lake also varies significantly, with some sections covered in muddy silt, and others in clean sand or glacial debris. Ironwood is home to perch, northern pike, walleye, burbot, and lake whitefish. There is a boat launch and campground on the south shore.

=== Lake statistics ===
Morphometric and hydrological characteristics of waterbodies in the Park and Recreation Area

Lake	Maximum Depth (m)	Mean Depth (m)	Surface Area (ha)	Shoreline Length (km)	Drainage Area (km2)
Blackett	10.0	4.5	611	28.3	22.2
Helena	16.2	9.5	706	28.3	38.2
Ironwood	16.0	8.5	984	24.0	99.4
Jackson	10.0	3.9	565	15.7	43.4
Kinnaird	12.5	4.0	838	26.0	28.6
McGuffin	9.1	2.6	230	13.5	13.7
Pinehurst	26.0	12.2	4,089	49.8	176.1
Seibert	11.0	6.1	3,600	35.1	69.9
Shaw	3.0	1.7	278		
Spencer	7.0	4.1	1,711	22.3	99.9
Touchwood	40.0	14.8	2,910	36.6	172.9

Summer water characteristic of lakes in the Park and Recreation Area

Lake	Total dissolved solids (mg/L)	Secchi disk transparency (m)	Surface pH	Conductivity (μS/m)
Blackett	164	2.5	8.4	800
Helena	115	3.0	7.6	
Ironwood	184	4.0	8.4	230
Jackson	146	-	8.3	277
Kinnaird	169	3.0	8.5	322
McGuffin	175	3.0	8.6	322
Pinehurst	228	1.5	8.1	205
Shaw	124	-	7.2	248
Spencer	174	1.2	8.4	310
Touchwood	136	3.5	9.1	157

== Controversies and land use conflicts ==
Lakeland Provincial Park and Recreation Area has been the subject of a number of conflicts with other regional land users.

=== CFB Cold Lake ===
One of the largest impediments to the creation of Lakeland Provincial Park and Recreation stemmed from concerns of nearby Canadian Forces Base Cold Lake. During public consultations on the park, base officials expressed concern that complaints over the noise from low-flying jets could jeopardize the operations of CFB Cold Lake. Indeed, military officials resisted the use of the term "park". Major Jim Christie, then the Deputy Base Operations Officer, stated "We would prefer to see it called something other than a park so there is no connotation of peace and quiet that would be disrupted by aircraft activity". In response, the provincial government provided base officials the opportunity to influence where facilities and trails were situated in the park.

The provincial government made a number of other concessions towards the military base. These included:

- To inform the public through advertising and promotional material that the area is subject to noise impacts from low flying aircraft.
- To respond to noise complaints from park users regarding aircraft operations.
- To support the Department of National Defence in not considering any damage claims resulting from sonic booms.
- To include a caveat in formal land use agreements and official documents which "clearly states flights at all altitudes are permitted over the Provincial Park and Recreation Area".
- To prohibit the construction of any recreational facilities within 1 kilometer of the boundary of the Cold Lake Air Weapons Range.
- "To support the Department of National Defence in their policy of prosecution for public trespass" on the weapons range.

=== Float planes ===
In the mid-1990s, Lakeland Provincial Park was the site of a unique protest by float plane pilots in Alberta. Pilot Stan Elchuk, of Edmonton, attempted to organize a protest landing of float planes on Jackson and Kinnaird Lakes in June 1996 to bring attention to perceived discriminatory provincial regulations. The pilot felt the province was discriminating against float plane operators because they required special permission to land in the park, while other motorized users, in this case powerboats, were free of regulations. Early management plans for the park had banned all motors in the park, although a provincial government spokesperson did admit the rules were rarely enforced. While the protest did raise public awareness of the issue, it appears no regulations were changed after the incident.

Float planes are allowed on lakes in Lakeland Provincial Recreation Area.

== Conservation ==
Lakeland Provincial Park and Lakeland Provincial Recreation area protect over 200 species of birds, a large number of boreal mammals, and many fish species.

=== Fish ===
There are a number of fish species found and documented in the Lakeland area. These include:

- Northern pike - Esox lucius. Also known as jackfish, shovelnose, and water wolf. One of the most widely distributed game fish in the area. Northern pike are found in all waterbodies in the Park and Recreation Area, excepting Shaw Lake. The pike prey on smaller fishes in the area, including yellow perch. Pike have also been known to eat rodents and waterfowl. Pike fishing in the area is a popular activity, and Seibert Lake is known to contain "trophy" quality pikes.
- Walleye - Stizostedion vitreum. Also known as pickerel, pike-perch, and wall-eye pike. Similar to the pike, the walleye is found in all waterbodies in the Park and Recreation Area, except Shaw Lake. Considered one of the most desirable sport fish in the Boreal region, walleye were over-harvested by commercial fishing and recreational anglers in the 1970s and 1980s. Strict guidelines have helped these populations recover, although fishing limits are still in place.
- Yellow perch
- Lake whitefish
- Cisco
- Longnose sucker
- White sucker
- Spottail shiner
- Burbot
- Iowa darter
- Brook stickleback
- Fathead minnow
- Lake chub

Distribution of fish by waterbody in Lakeland Provincial Park and Recreation Area

Waterbody	Northern pike	Walleye	Yellow perch	Lake whitefish	Cisco	Longnose sucker	White sucker	Spottail shiner	Burbot	Iowa darter	Brook stickleback	Fathead minnow	Lake chub
Blackett Lake	Yes	Yes	Yes	Yes	Yes	Yes	Yes	Yes	Yes	Yes	Yes	No	No
Helena Lake	Yes	Yes	Yes	Yes	No	Yes	Yes	Yes	Yes	Yes	Yes	No	No
Ironwood Lake	Yes	Yes	Yes	Yes	Yes	Yes	Yes	Yes	Yes	Yes	No	No	No
Jackson Lake	Yes	Yes	Yes	No	Yes	Yes	Yes	Yes	Yes	No	Yes	No	No
Kinnaird Lake	Yes	Yes	Yes	No	Yes	Yes	Yes	Yes	Yes	No	No	No	No
McGuffin Lake	Yes	Yes	Yes	Yes	No	Yes	Yes	Yes	Yes	Yes	No	No	No
Pinehurst Lake	Yes	Yes	Yes	Yes	Yes	Yes	Yes	Yes	Yes	Yes	No	No	No
Sand River	Yes	Yes	Yes	No	No	Yes	Yes	Yes	Yes	Yes	No	Yes	Yes
Seibert Lake	Yes	Yes	Yes	Yes	Yes	Yes	Yes	Yes	Yes	Yes	Yes	Yes	No
Shaw Lake	No	No	No	No	No	No	No	No	No	No	No	Yes	No
Spencer Lake	Yes	Yes	Yes	Yes	Yes	Yes	Yes	Yes	Yes	Yes	No	No	No
Touchwood Lake	Yes	Yes	Yes	Yes	Yes	Yes	Yes	Yes	Yes	Yes	No	No	No
Dabbs Lake	[?]	[?]	[?]	[?]	[?]	[?]	[?]	[?]	[?]	[?]	[?]	[?]	[?]

=== Birds ===
The Government of Alberta conducted a survey of birds in the park throughout 1993. The report found 153 species of birds to be present on lakes in the park. The report also noted that its list was "not exhaustive" and did not reflect a number of species that were not the focus of the investigation, namely species not residing on major waterbodies.

==== List of birds found in Lakeland Provincial Park and Recreation Area ====
- Common loon (great northern diver). The common loon arrives in the park during spring breakup, and remains until early October. Loon often make their nests on islands, protected sites on points, or in sheltered bays. Loon exhibit a strong nest fidelity, often returning to the same nest site. Eggs are laid in May and June, and hatch one month later. Young loons are able to fly at approximately 12 weeks. The survey found 250 loons in the park, with the largest numbers on Blackett Lake (23 birds), Dabbs Lake (20 birds), Jackson Lake (20 birds), Kinnaird Lake (29 birds), Pinehurst Lake (38 birds), and Touchwood Lake (48 birds). Touchwood Lake acts as a regional staging area for the loons, and over 500 birds have been observed on the lake in a single day. Loons on Touchwood Lake are often forced to inhabit relatively exposed nest sites, this factor, when combined with summer flocking, makes the loons vulnerable to water-based recreational activities. Loon habitat in the Park and Recreation area is also impacted by backcountry campsites used by hikers and canoeists. Loons in the park also faced pressure from commercial fishing prior to the parks designation. After the park's creation, loons were impacted by the lead weights used in recreational fishing, and waves from powerboats which swamped nests. The Alberta Parks Service recommended that the province protect nesting and rearing areas by restricting access during egg laying and incubation, as well as watercraft restrictions to reduce waves.
- Pied-billed grebe. The pied-billed grebe was found in the park throughout summer and fall. This species possibly nests on the large marshes found near Snug Cove on Pinehurst Lake.
- Red-necked grebe. The red-necked grebe is a common summer visitor in the Park and Recreation Area. It nests in shallow open water and shoreline beds or bulrushes. The bird nests in the park from May until August. During the 1993 survey, the largest number of birds were found on Ironwood, Pinehurst, Shaw, and Touchwood Lakes. The survey found 814 red-necked grebes in total residing in the Park and Recreation Area. Red-neck grebe nests are susceptible to disturbance by power boats.
- Eared grebe. The eared grebe is a rare site in the park, as Lakeland is near the northern edge of the species' range. It is found on small ponds south of both Jackson Lake and Pinehurst Lake.
- Western grebe. Like the eared grebe, the western grebe is a rare sight in Lakeland Provincial Park and Recreation Area. Individual birds have been sighted on Touchwood, Pinehurst, Ironwood, and Jackson Lakes, although they may have been visitors from nearby Cold Lake or Lac La Biche, where larger numbers are found. The Lakeland area is at the northern edge of this species' range.
- American white pelican. This bird is a frequent summer bird to the park, found on Dabbs, Ironwood, Kinnaird, Jackson, Seibert, Shaw, and Touchwood Lakes. The northeast corner of Pinehurst Lake was found to have the highest concentration of birds. Most of the birds depart the area my late September. The American white pelican is very sensitive to disturbances at nest sites, often resulting in complete abandonment.
- Double-crested cormorant. This bird appears more frequently in the Park and Recreation area in the fall. During the summer, individuals have only been sighted on Kinnaird and Pinehurst Lakes. Nearby nesting colonies are found on Lac La Biche and Frog Lake. The double-crested cormorant was once an endangered species in Alberta, although it has since been removed from the endangered species list.
- Great blue heron. The great blue heron is a common summer resident in Lakeland Provincial Park and Recreation area, found in most of the lakes and wetlands in the region. Despite common appearances in the area, the 1993 study found only one heron colony on the southeast corner of Pinehurst Lake, with less than 10 active nests in the colony.
- Tundra swan. Tundra swans are found in the spring on the lakes in the Park and Recreation Area.

== Activities ==
Facilities can be found at Shaw Lake.

Campground usage is free, and reservations are voluntary in this backcountry camping sites.

- canoeing
- hiking
- birdwatching
- ice fishing
- camping
- cross-country skiing
- mountain biking

Hiking and canoeing can be combined in a back country canoe circuit.

== See also ==
- List of provincial parks in Alberta
- List of Canadian provincial parks
- List of National Parks of Canada
