= Geikie River =

River in Saskatchewan, Canada

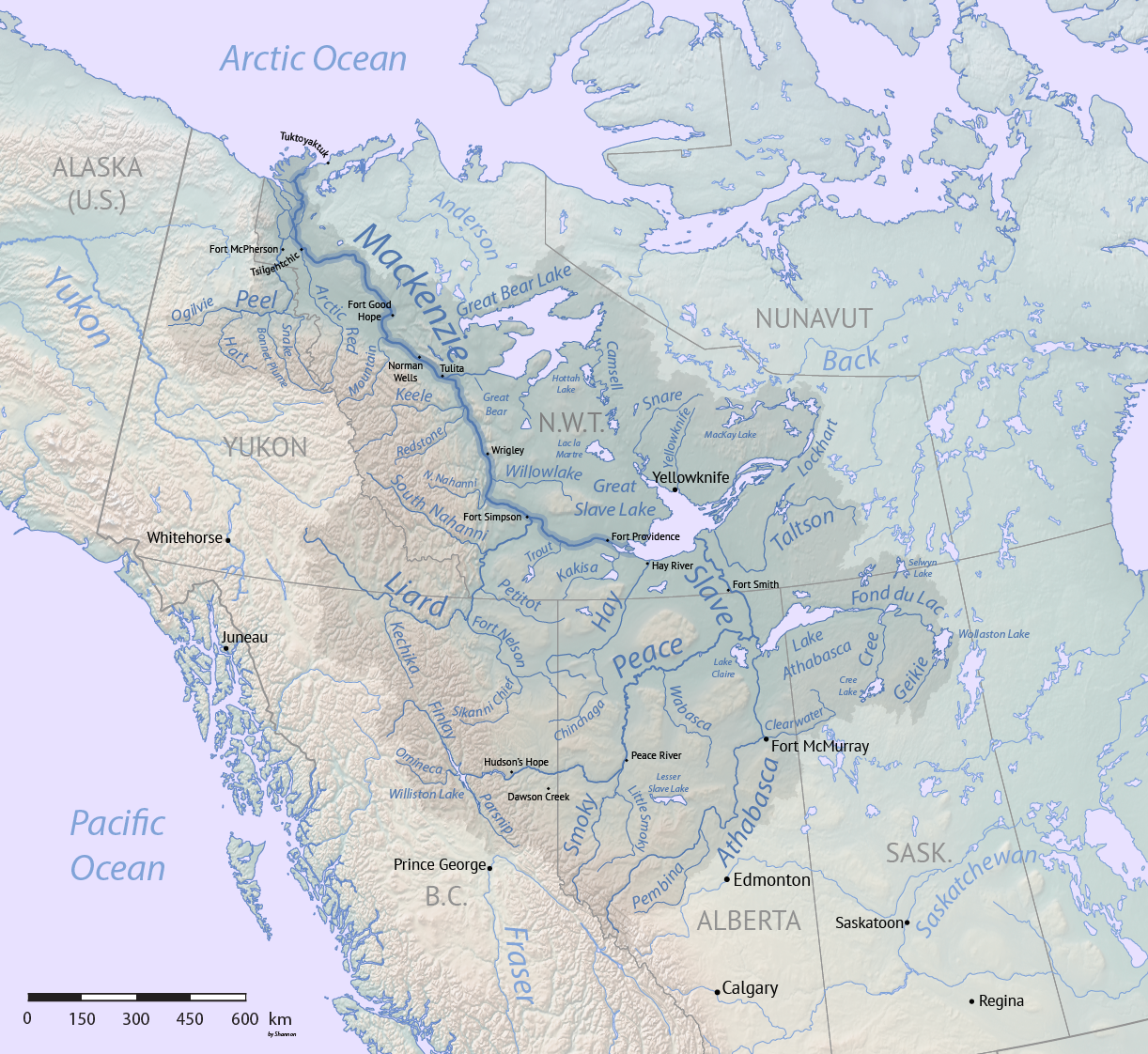
- Mackenzie River drainage basin

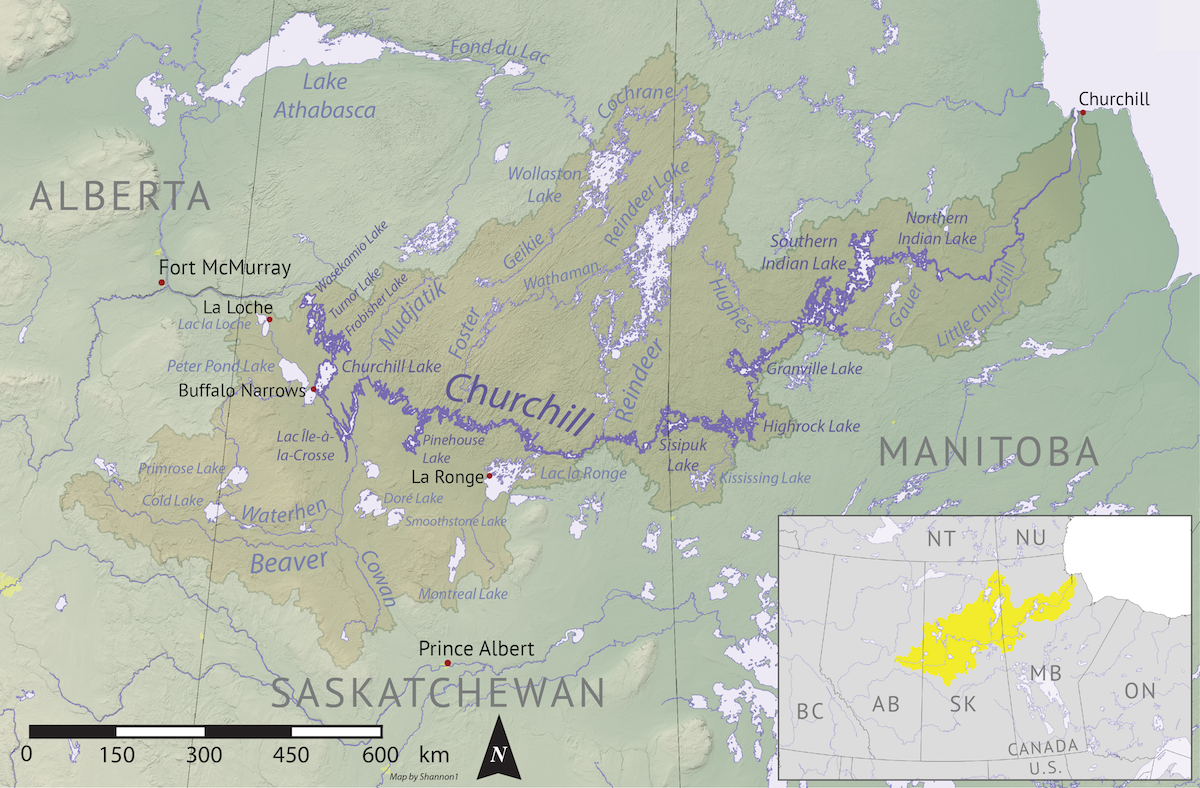
- Churchill River drainage basin

- Location of the mouth of the Geikie River in Saskatchewan Geikie River (Canada)

Location
- Country: Canada
- Province: Saskatchewan

Physical characteristics
- Source: Costigan Lake
  - location: Northern Administration District
  - coordinates: 56°58′14″N 105°52′33″W
  - elevation: 543 m (1,781 ft)
- Mouth: Wollaston Lake
  - location: Northern Administration District
  - coordinates: 57°45′00″N 103°52′02″W
  - elevation: 398 m (1,306 ft)
- Basin size: 7,730 km^{2} (2,980 sq mi)

Basin features
- River system: Mackenzie River drainage basin and Churchill River drainage basin
- Tributaries
  - left: Wheeler River
- Waterbodies: Highrock Lake; Big Sandy Lake

The Geikie River is a river in the northern part of the Canadian province of Saskatchewan.

== Course ==
The river's source is Costigan Lake, which is near the uranium producing areas around the Key Lake mine in the Athabasca Basin. It flows in a north-easterly direction, passing through Highrock Lake and Big Sandy Lake. It receives the Wheeler River tributary from the north, and then flows into Wollaston Lake.

As the primary inflow of Wollaston Lake, the largest natural bifurcation lake in the world, the Geikie River's most unusual feature is that it interrupts a major drainage divide which separates waters flowing into Hudson Bay from those flowing into the Arctic Ocean. From Wollaston Lake, waters from the Geikie River can flow into either the Fond du Lac River which flows out of the lake to the north-west where it drains into Lake Athabasca which ultimately drains into the Arctic Ocean via the Mackenzie River system, or into the Cochrane River which flows out of the north-eastern side of the lake and into Reindeer Lake which drains via the Churchill River system into Hudson Bay. If Hudson Bay is defined as part of the Atlantic Ocean, then the Geikie River is the largest river in the world that drains naturally into two oceans.

== Geikie River Recreation Site ==
Geikie River Recreation Site (57.7064°N 103.9513°W), also called Geikie River Campground, is a provincially run park on the north side of the Geikie River, near its mouth. The campground features eight free campsites, a boat launch, and a fish cleaning station. It is located along Highway 905 at the highway's 184-kilometre mark, 30 kilometres (19 mi) south of Wollaston Lake Landing and 210 kilometres (130 mi) north of the community of Southend.

== See also ==
- List of rivers of Saskatchewan
- Hudson Bay drainage basin
