= Hatchet Lake (Saskatchewan) =

Lake in Saskatchewan, Canada

- Location in Saskatchewan Hatchet Lake (Canada)

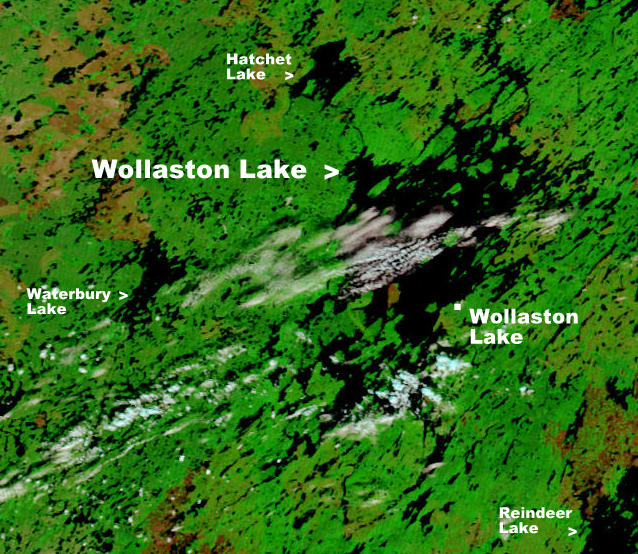
- Hatchet Lake is north of Wollaston Lake
- Location: Northern Administration District, Saskatchewan
- Coordinates: 58°38′01″N 103°40′02″W
- Part of: Mackenzie River drainage basin
- Primary inflows: Fond du Lac River
- Primary outflows: Fond du Lac River
- Basin countries: Canada
- Surface area: 13,280 ha (32,800 acres)
- Max. depth: 25.3 m (83 ft)
- Shore length^{1}: 244 km (152 mi)
- Surface elevation: 392 m (1,286 ft)
- Islands: Topping Island; Sandy Island
- Settlements: None
- ^{1} Shore length is not a well-defined measure.

Hatchet Lake is a remote lake in the north-eastern part of the Canadian province of Saskatchewan. It is north of Wollaston Lake along the course of the Fond du Lac River. The Fond du Lac River flows from Wollaston Lake through Hatchet Lake north-west to Black Lake and Lake Athabasca.

The lake is served by the Hatchet Lake Airport and Hatchet Lake Water Aerodrome, both operated by the Hatchet Lake Lodge. There is no highway access to the lake.

In 1963, the Hatchet Lake Lodge was constructed on Sandy Island, one of the islands near the eastern shore of Hatchet Lake. Hatchet Lake Lodge is a fly-in fishing lodge.

== Fish species ==
Fish commonly found in Hatchet Lake include cisco, lake whitefish, round whitefish, burbot, walleye, Arctic grayling, lake trout, northern pike, white sucker, longnose sucker, and yellow perch.

== See also ==
- List of lakes of Saskatchewan
