= Cree River =

River in Saskatchewan, Canada

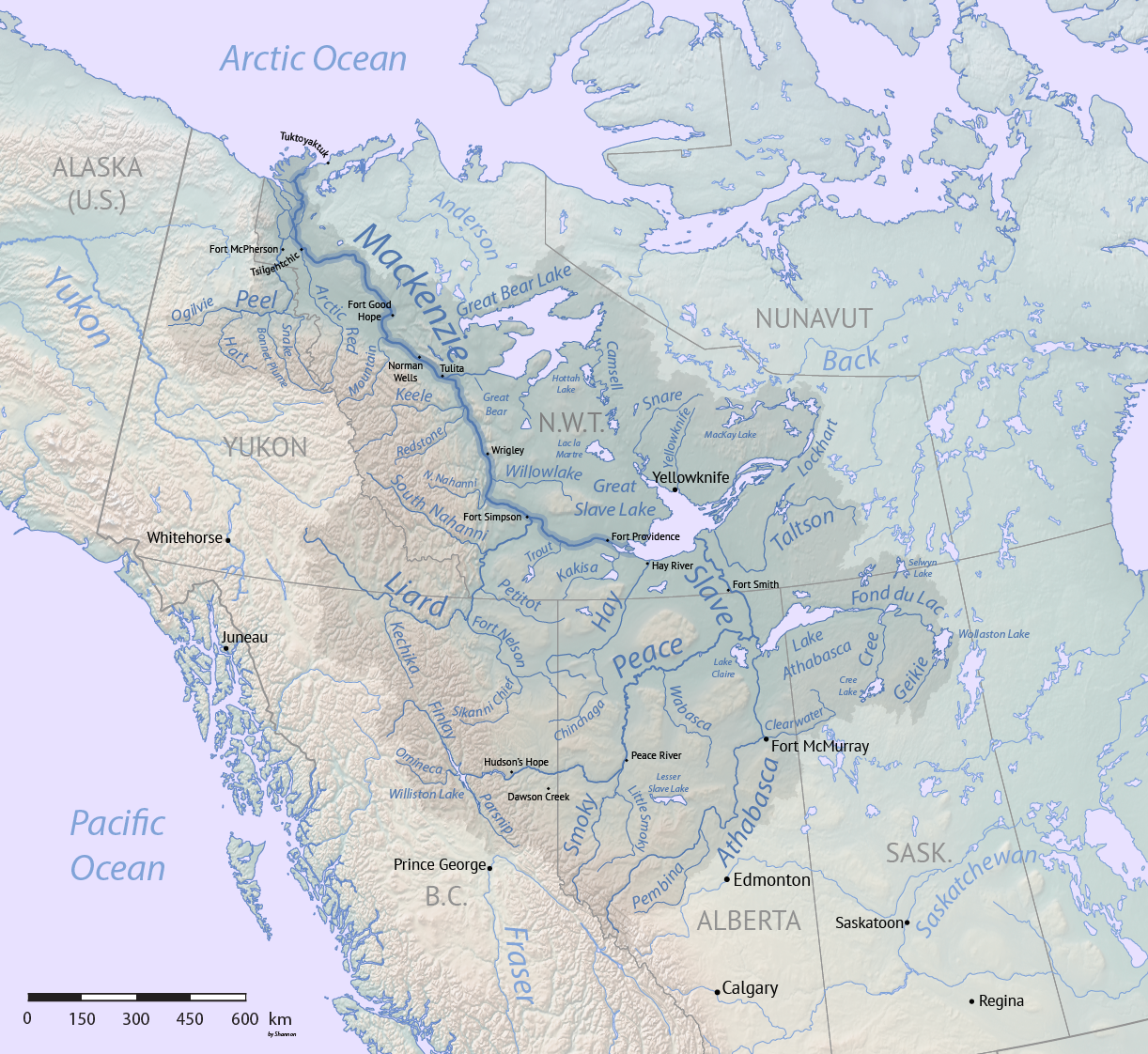
- Map of the Mackenzie River watershed

- Location of the mouth of the Cree River Cree River (Canada)

Location
- Country: Canada
- State: Saskatchewan

Physical characteristics
- Source: Cree Lake
  - coordinates: 57°43′11.5″N 106°17′15″W
  - elevation: 487 m (1,598 ft)
- Mouth: Black Lake
  - coordinates: 58°57′1″N 105°47′3″W
  - elevation: 281 m (922 ft)
- Length: 150 km (93 mi)
- Basin size: 20,700 km^{2} (8,000 sq mi)

Basin features
- River system: Mackenzie River drainage basin

The Cree River is a river in northern Saskatchewan located in the Athabasca Basin of the Canadian Shield. The river flows north from Cree Lake to Black Lake. The river is part of the Mackenzie River drainage basin.

The river is bridged near its mouth south of Black Lake by Highway 905

== Tributaries ==
- Pipestone River flows in from the left at 58°38′1″N 105°45′3″W
- Timson River (left)
- Little Cree River (right)
- Rapid River (Cree River)

== See also ==
- List of rivers of Saskatchewan
