= Wolf River (Alberta) =

- Location of the mouth of the Wolf River in Alberta

Location
- Country: Canada
- Province: Alberta
- Census division: No. 12
- Municipal districts: Bonnyville No. 87, Lac La Biche County

Physical characteristics
- Source: Unnamed swamp
  - location: Lac La Biche County
  - coordinates: 54°48′05″N 110°33′32″W
  - elevation: 699 m (2,293 ft)
- Mouth: Sand River
  - location: Bonnyville No. 87
  - coordinates: 54°43′32″N 111°08′10″W
  - elevation: 565 m (1,854 ft)

Basin features
- River system: Hudson Bay drainage basin

The Wolf River is a river in the Municipal District of Bonnyville No. 87 and Lac La Biche County in census division No. 12, Alberta, Canada. It is in the Hudson Bay drainage basin and is a left tributary of the Sand River.

== Course ==
The river begins at an unnamed swamp, flows west to Wolf Lake, and continues west to its mouth at the Sand River. The Sand River empties via the Beaver River and the Churchill River to Hudson Bay.

== See also ==
- List of rivers of Alberta
