= Sand River (Alberta) =

River in Alberta, Canada

Location
- Country: Canada
- Province: Alberta

Physical characteristics
- Source
  - coordinates: 55.19098°N 110.45159°W
  - elevation: 675 m (2,215 ft)
- Mouth
  - location: Beaver River
  - coordinates: 54.37839°N 111.03428°W
  - elevation: 526 m (1,726 ft)

The Sand River is a major tributary of the Beaver River in Alberta, Canada.

== Course ==
The Sand River originates in a system of lakes in northern Alberta, between Winefred Lake and Cold Lake and at an elevation of 675 metres (2,215 ft). From there it flows generally towards the south and west. It enters the Caribou Lake, then continues north-west and west until it receives the waters of Ipiatik River, then turns south. It flows between Standish Lake, Spencer Lake and Seibert Lake, east of the Lakeland Provincial Park, then receives the waters of Wolf River, west of Wolf Lake. It receives the Punk Creek from Pinehurst Lake before it is crosses by Highway 55 (part of the Northern Woods and Water Route) at Truman. It then turns eastwards and flows into the Beaver River, at an elevation of 526 metres (1,726 ft). The Beaver River is a major tributary of the Churchill River, which flows east into Hudson Bay.

== Tributaries ==
- Caribou Lake
- Ipiatik River
- Wolf River
- Punk Creek (from Pinehurst Lake)

== See also ==
- List of rivers of Alberta
- Hudson Bay drainage basin
