= Chicken 224 =

Indian reserve in Saskatchewan, Canada

Coordinates: 59°11′56″N 105°37′33″W

- Indian reserve
- Chicken Indian Reserve No. 224
- Location in Saskatchewan
- First Nation: Black Lake
- Country: Canada
- Province: Saskatchewan

Area
  - Total: 25,819.4 ha (63,801 acres)

Population (2016)
  - Total: 1,379
  - Density: 5.341/km^{2} (13.83/sq mi)
- Community Well-Being Index: 42

Chicken 224 is an Indian reserve of the Black Lake Denesuline First Nation in Saskatchewan. It is 170 kilometres southeast of Uranium City. In the 2016 Canadian Census, it recorded a population of 1,379 living in 263 of its 280 total private dwellings. In the same year, its Community Well-Being index was calculated at 42 of 100, compared to 58.4 for the average First Nations community and 77.5 for the average non-Indigenous community.

== Etymology ==
The three Chicken reserves were named after a Chief Chicken, early leader of the Black Lake band.

== See also ==
- List of Indian reserves in Saskatchewan
