= Chicken 225 =

Indian reserve in Saskatchewan, Canada

Coordinates: 59°17′13″N 105°45′23″W

- Indian reserve
- Chicken Indian Reserve No. 225
- Location in Saskatchewan
- First Nation: Black Lake
- Country: Canada
- Province: Saskatchewan

Area
  - Total: 2,183.4 ha (5,395 acres)

Population (2016)
  - Total: 0
  - Density: 0.0/km^{2} (0.0/sq mi)

Chicken 225 is an Indian reserve of the Black Lake Denesuline First Nation in Saskatchewan. In the 2016 Canadian Census, it recorded a population of 0 living in 0 of its 0 total private dwellings.

== Etymology ==
The three Chicken reserves were named after a Chief Chicken, early leader of the Black Lake band.

== See also ==
- List of Indian reserves in Saskatchewan
