= Costigan Lake =

Lake in Saskatchewan, Canada

- Location in Saskatchewan Costigan Lake (Canada)
- Location: Northern Administration District, Saskatchewan
- Coordinates: 56°57′00″N 105°54′02″W
- Part of: Mackenzie River drainage basin and Churchill River drainage basin
- River sources: Canadian Shield
- Primary outflows: Geikie River
- Basin countries: Canada
- Surface area: 6,415 ha (15,850 acres)
- Max. depth: 38.8 m (127 ft)
- Shore length^{1}: 295 km (183 mi)
- Surface elevation: 542 m (1,778 ft)
- Settlements: None
- ^{1} Shore length is not a well-defined measure.

Costigan Lake is a lake in northern Saskatchewan, Canada. It is the source of the Geikie River, which is the primary inflow for the bifurcating Wollaston Lake.

Costigan Lake Lodge, which is a fly-in only camp and outfitters, is "located on a sandy pine-covered ridge, in a peaceful bay on Costigan Lake".

== Description ==
Costigan Lake is a large, irregularly shaped lake with many bays, peninsulas, and islands in the Canadian Shield. Its primary outflow is the Geikie River which flows out from the eastern end of the lake. The river flows eastward into Wollaston Lake. Wollaston Lake — with its two outflows — drains through the Churchill River system to Hudson Bay and the Mackenzie River system to the Arctic Ocean.

== Fish species ==
Fish commonly found in Costigan Lake include walleye, northern pike, yellow perch, burbot, cisco, lake trout, lake whitefish, longnose sucker, and white sucker.

== See also ==
- List of lakes of Saskatchewan
