= Chicken 226 =

Indian reserve in Saskatchewan, Canada

Coordinates: 59°12′58″N 104°56′29″W

- Indian reserve
- Chicken Indian Reserve No. 226
- Location in Saskatchewan
- First Nation: Black Lake
- Country: Canada
- Province: Saskatchewan

Area
  - Total: 4,216.9 ha (10,420 acres)

Chicken 226 is an Indian reserve of the Black Lake Denesuline First Nation in Saskatchewan.

== Etymology ==
The three Chicken reserves were named after a Chief Chicken, early leader of the Black Lake band.

== See also ==
- List of Indian reserves in Saskatchewan
