= Michel Village =

Coordinates: 56°00′31″N 109°06′40″W

Location of Michel Village in Saskatchewan

Michel Village is a northern hamlet in Saskatchewan. It is located on the western shore of Peter Pond Lake at the end of Highway 925 north of Dillon. There were 66 residents in Michel Village in 2011. The mayor is Cliff Coombs.

== Demographics ==
In the 2021 Census of Population conducted by Statistics Canada, Michel Village had a population of 37 living in 21 of its 33 total private dwellings, a change of -57% from its 2016 population of 86. With a land area of 3.81 km^{2} (1.47 sq mi), it had a population density of 9.7/km^{2} (25.2/sq mi) in 2021.

== See also ==
- List of communities in Northern Saskatchewan
- List of communities in Saskatchewan
