= Courtenay Lake =

Lake in Saskatchewan, Canada

- Location in Saskatchewan Courtenay Lake (Canada)
- Location: Northern Administration District, Saskatchewan
- Coordinates: 57.4001°N 103.9671°W
- Basin countries: Canada
- Surface area: 363 ha (900 acres)
- Surface elevation: 411 m (1,348 ft)
- Settlements: None

Courtenay Lake is a lake in the Canadian province of Saskatchewan. It is situated in the Churchill River Upland ecozone in the north-eastern corner of the Northern Saskatchewan Administration District. The lake is set in a forest of jack pine and most of the eastern shore is part of a provincial campground. Access to the lake and park is from Highway 905. The only service near the lake is Km 147 Lamp Lighters Lodge, which is a motel, gas station, and restaurant on Highway 905.

== Courtenay Lake Recreation Site ==
Courtenay Lake Recreation Site (57.3923°N 103.9667°W) is a rustic campground and picnic area located on the eastern shore of Courtenay Lake. The site has five campsites, a naturally sandy beach, and a boat launch for access to the lake. Lake trout are the most commonly found fish in the lake.

== See also ==
- List of lakes of Saskatchewan
