= Sandy Island (Saskatchewan) =

Island in Saskatchewan, Canada

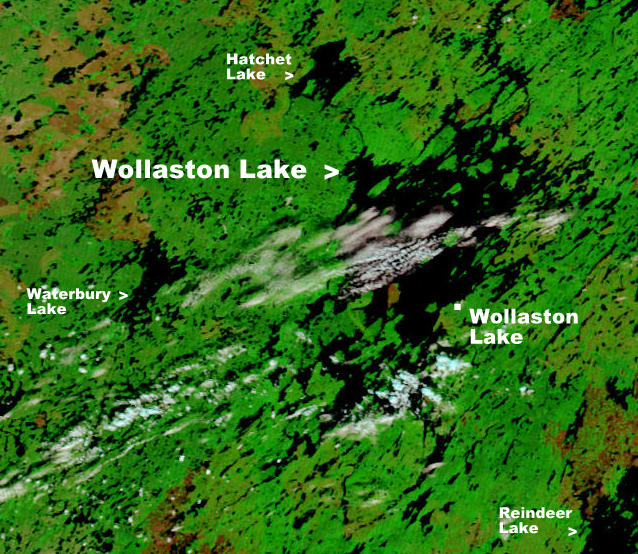
- Hatchet Lake is north of Wollaston Lake
- Interactive map of Sandy Island

Geography
- Location: Saskatchewan
- Coordinates: 58°38′30″N 103°34′36″W

Administration
- Canada

Sandy Island is a small island in Hatchet Lake in Saskatchewan's Northern Administration District, Canada. The island contains the main site for the Hatchet Lake Lodge (established in 1963). The island is treed, with a small and large sandy beach.

The Island is accessed by the Hatchet Lake Airport and Hatchet Lake Water Aerodrome both owned by the Hatchet Lake Lodge.

== See also ==
- List of islands of Saskatchewan
