= Davin Lake =

Lake in Saskatchewan, Canada

- Location in Saskatchewan Davin Lake (Canada)
- Location: Northern Administration District, Saskatchewan
- Coordinates: 56.8261°N 103.7217°W
- Type: Glacial lake
- Part of: Churchill River drainage basin
- Basin countries: Canada
- Surface area: 7,083.8 ha (17,504 acres)
- Max. depth: 5.4 m (18 ft)
- Shore length^{1}: 332.5 km (206.6 mi)
- Surface elevation: 367 m (1,204 ft)
- Islands: Robertson Islands; Molloy Island; Russell Island; Smith Island
- Settlements: None
- ^{1} Shore length is not a well-defined measure.

Davin Lake is a glacial lake in the boreal forest of the Canadian province of Saskatchewan. On the eastern shore of the lake — at Currie Bay — is a provincial campground and Davin Lake Lodge. The lodge is an outfitters and has cabin and boat rentals. Access to the lake and its amenities is from Highway 905 and Davin Lake Airport. There are no communities on the lake's shore.

Davin Lake is irregularly shaped and has multiple bays and islands. Many of the lake's features are named after fallen Canadian soldiers. Its outflow is a short river that flows from the north end into Wathaman Lake. Wathaman Lake is connected to the Wathaman River, which flows east into Reindeer Lake.

== Davin Lake Recreation Site ==
Davin Lake Recreation Site (56.8784°N 103.5918°W) is campground on Currie Bay of Davin Lake. The park covers an area of 165 ha (410 acres) and is accessed from Highway 905 and the airfield.

== GeoMemorial Commemorative Naming Program ==
The GeoMemorial Commemorative Naming Program is a program that names geographical features in honour of those who lost their lives in the service of Canada. Twelve features of Davin Lake have been name through this program:

- Robertson Islands — named after Ian Anderson Robertson
- Russell Island — named after Hugh James Russell
- Hillier Bay — named after Richard Hillier
- Currie Bay — named after Stanley Kenneth Currie
- Wallace Bay — named after Peter William Wallace
- Thompson Bay — named after Robert James Thompson
- Cairns Bay — named after Leonard Melville Cairns
- Olson Bay — named after Lloyd Allyn Olson
- Morrison Island — named after Ewen Morrison
- Robertson Narrows — named after William Dalton Robertson
- Michael Bay — named after John Edward Michael
- Robertson Point — named after Donald Morrison Robertson

== Fish species ==
Fish commonly found in Davin Lake include northern pike, lake whitefish, walleye, yellow perch, burbot, and lake trout.

== See also ==
- List of lakes of Saskatchewan
- Tourism in Saskatchewan
