= Buffalo River Dene Nation 193 =

Indian reserve in Saskatchewan, Canada

Coordinates: 55°55′23″N 109°02′09″W

- Indian reserve
- Buffalo River Dene Nation Indian Reserve No. 193
- Location in Saskatchewan
- First Nation: Buffalo River
- Country: Canada
- Province: Saskatchewan

Area
  - Total: 8,259.7 ha (20,410 acres)

Population (2016)
  - Total: 783
  - Density: 9.48/km^{2} (24.6/sq mi)
- Community Well-Being Index: 54

Buffalo River Dene Nation 193 is an Indian reserve of the Buffalo River Dene Nation in Saskatchewan. It is 84 kilometres northwest of Île-à-la-Crosse. In the 2016 Canadian Census, it recorded a population of 783 living in 233 of its 260 total private dwellings. In the same year, its Community Well-Being index was calculated at 54 of 100, compared to 58.4 for the average First Nations community and 77.5 for the average non-Indigenous community.

== See also ==
- List of Indian reserves in Saskatchewan
