= Pinehurst Lake =

Lake in Alberta, Canada

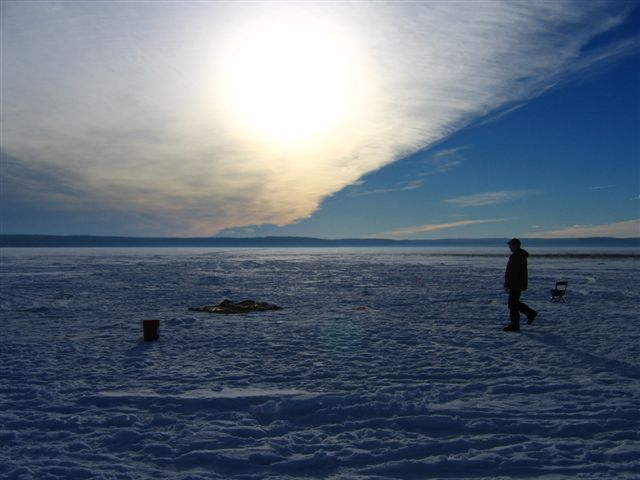
- Lake in January

- Location within Alberta
- Location: Lakeland Provincial Park, Lac La Biche County, Alberta
- Coordinates: 54°39′47″N 111°25′02″W
- Type: eutrophic
- Primary outflows: Sand River (Beaver River)
- Catchment area: 285 km^{2} (110 sq mi)
- Basin countries: Canada
- Max. length: 9.4 km (5.8 mi)
- Max. width: 6.1 km (3.8 mi)
- Surface area: 40.7 km^{2} (15.7 sq mi)
- Average depth: 12.2 m (40 ft)
- Max. depth: 21.3 m (70 ft)
- Shore length^{1}: 36.5 km (22.7 mi)
- ^{1} Shore length is not a well-defined measure.

Pinehurst Lake is a lake in Northeastern Alberta. Located 245 kilometres (152 mi) northeast of Edmonton, in the Lakeland Provincial Recreation Area just east of the Lakeland Provincial Park, it is a popular destination for anglers and hunters alike.

Pinehurst Lake has a water surface of 40.7 km^{2} (15.7 sq mi), and drains by Punk Creek into the Sand River, a tributary in the Beaver River basin. The lake has a catchment area of 285 km^{2} (110 sq mi).
