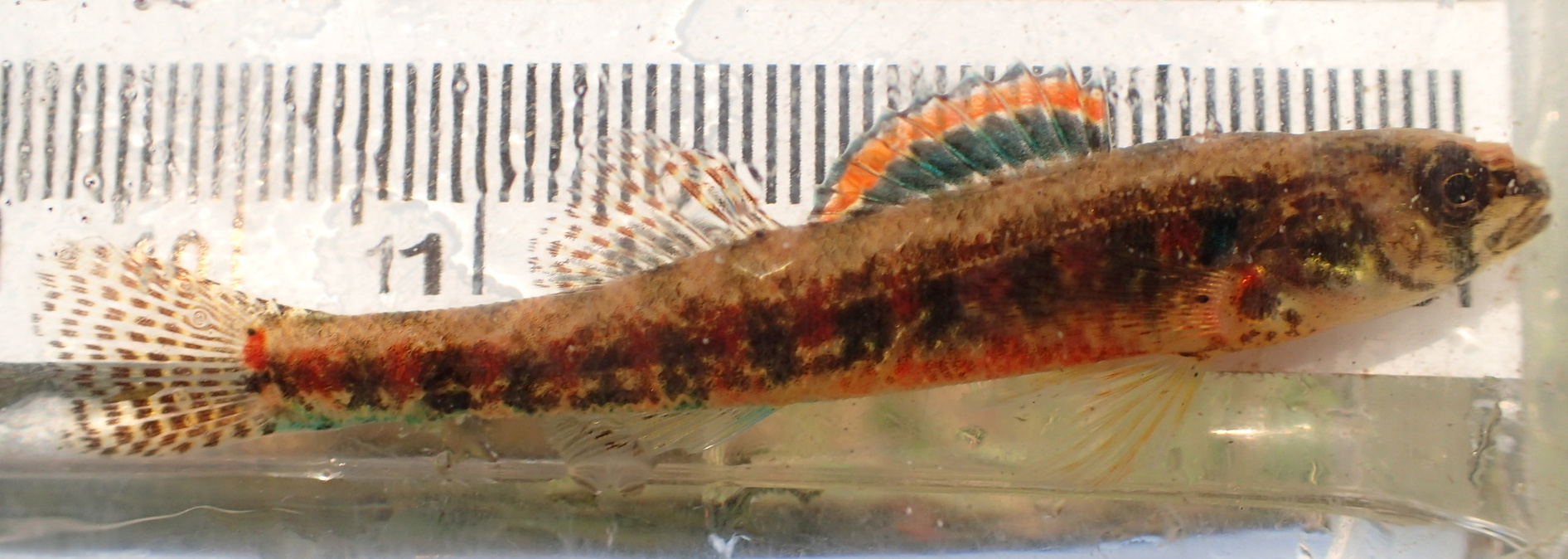
- Ontario, Canada

Conservation status
- Least Concern (IUCN 3.1)

Scientific classification
- Kingdom: Animalia
- Phylum: Chordata
- Class: Actinopterygii
- Order: Perciformes
- Family: Percidae
- Genus: Etheostoma
- Species: E. exile

Binomial name
- Etheostoma exile (Girard, 1859)

Synonyms
- Boleichthys exilis Girard, 1859; Poecilichthys exilis (Girard, 1859)

= Etheostoma exile =

Species of fish

Etheostoma exile, the Iowa darter, is a species of freshwater ray-finned fish, a darter from the subfamily Etheostomatinae, part of the family Percidae, which also contains the perches, ruffes and pikeperches. It is native to the lakes and streams of Iowa, along with about 17 other species of darters.

In some parts of its range, the Iowa darter is also known as the weed darter, red-sided darter, or yellowbelly. Iowa darters, like many other darters, are about 2–3 in (51–76 mm) in length and may be easily confused with other darters of similar color.

== Range ==
Native distribution of the Iowa darter extends north to central Canada, east to New York, and south to central Illinois, and the species is particularly common in the western Great Lakes drainages and Iowa. Western populations are distributed patchily in Colorado, Wyoming, Montana, and Alberta. They are native in Colorado only in the South Platte River drainage, but recent research has also placed them in the Yampa River (Colorado) and the Green River.

== Description ==
The Iowa darter has a very slim, small body. Its common length is around 5.5 cm and its maximum age is three years.

It has a small mouth and snout with scaled opercles and cheeks, two dorsal fins, one which is a spinous-rayed fin and another soft-rayed fin. Its caudal fin is squarish and the pectoral fins and pelvic fins are located close to each other behind the gills. It has an anal fin with two (rarely one) spines and an incomplete lateral line.

The male and female Iowa darters have different color patterns. During breeding, males are olivaceous dorsally with darker splotches across the top of their backs. Their sides are red with blue rectangular blotches and ventrally they are whitish with a dark wedge shape below the eyes. The bottom half of the spiny dorsal fin has blue spots between the spines and above the spots is a succession of three bands, orange on the bottom, clear in the middle, and then blue on the outside. Females are olive-brown dorsally with darker splotches across the top of their backs. Their sides are mottled and fade into a silver-white on their bellies. They also have a dark wedge shape below the eyes that is well developed.

== Habitat and habits ==
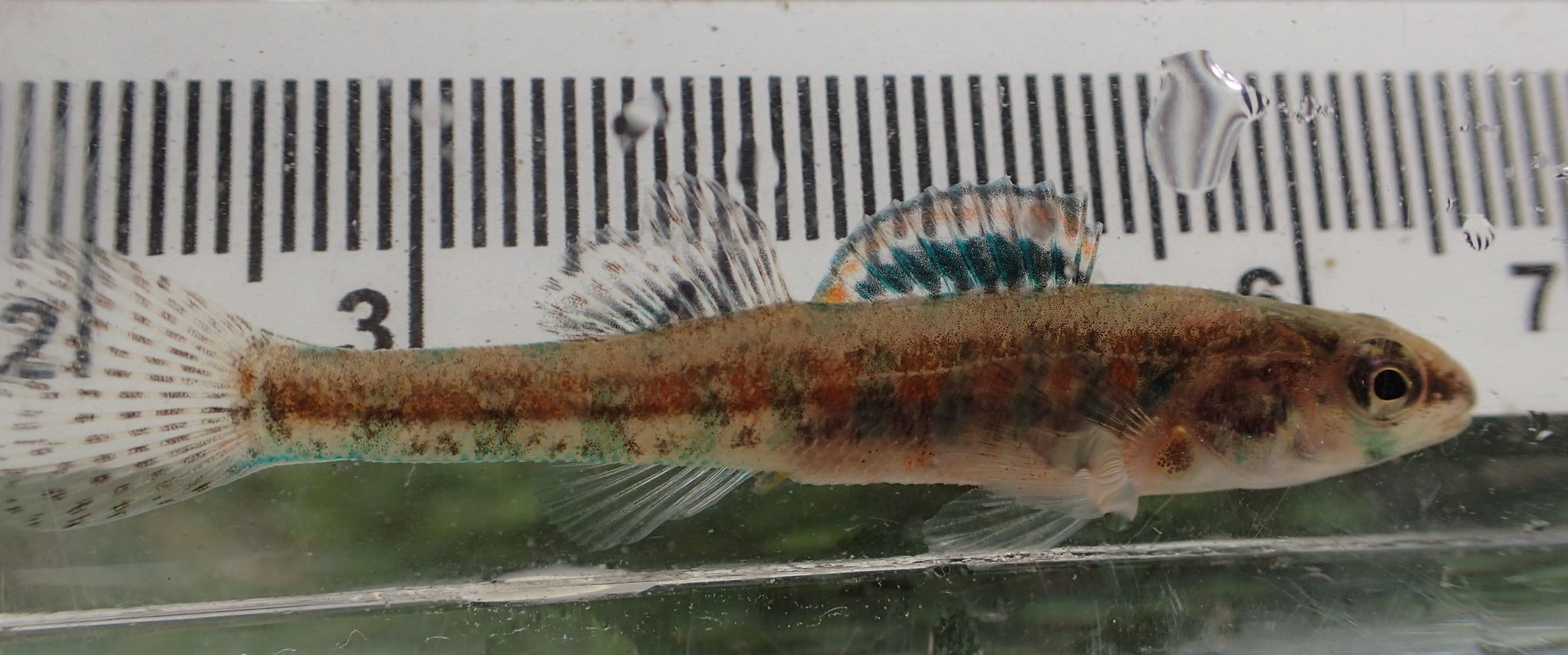
From Rainy Lake, Ontario

Iowa darters prefer cool, clear water over a sand or organic-matter substrate. They lack swim bladders, so sink to the stream or lake bottom. To move around, they make short dashes of astonishing speed (hence the name), often faster than the human eye can follow. The darter can zip along stream and lake substrate looking for food using less energy than other fish, which would keep floating up off the bottom.

== Diet ==
The Iowa darter eats copepods, water fleas, and midge and mayfly larvae it finds in underwater vegetation. It has never been found in the stomach of any fish-eating animal because it is too quick to catch.

== Conservation status ==
Iowa darters are considered vulnerable due to decreasing abundance and distribution. They appear to be decreasing in distribution over the last decade, and the limiting factor seems to be their habitats. This may be due to increasing turbidity limiting their preferred habitat.

== Reproduction ==
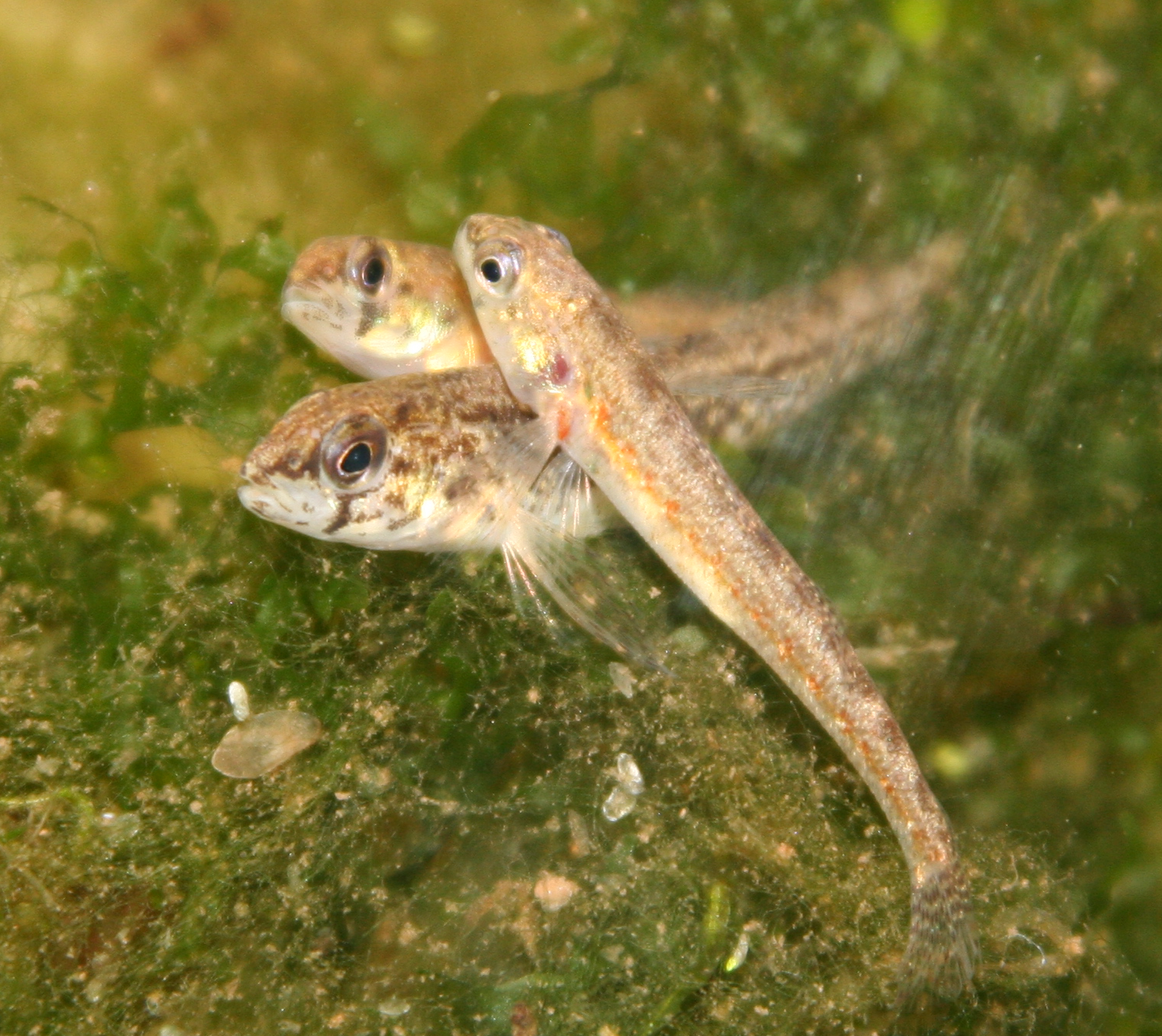
Female (middle) between two smaller males.

Iowa darters spawn mainly in the spring. They migrate from deeper regions of lakes and streams to the shallow, vegetated reaches for spawning. Males typically migrate before females, and maintain and defend small territories near undercut banks with rooted vegetation. Smaller males, however, are promiscuous, do not defend territories, and move from place to place in search of females. When a female enters a male's territory, the male courts the female by swimming around her until she positions herself near algae or rooted vegetation. The male mounts the female and positions himself with his pelvic fins in front of her dorsal fin. The anal and caudal fins of the male are placed on the same side of the female. Most spawning occurs at depths of 10–40 cm on fibrous roots beneath slightly undercut banks, although some eggs are laid directly on sand or on roots or other plant materials on sand. During each spawning act, three to seven eggs are deposited. Following the completion of spawning, the eggs receive some protection in that by continuing to maintain his territory, the male indirectly guards the eggs. Females mate with several males, then return to deeper habitats following spawning.

== Lifecycle ==
The spawned eggs of the Iowa darter average around a 1.1 mm in diameter. Their developmental time is around 18–26 days at 13–16 °C and the newly hatched darters are around 3.4 mm in standard length. The hatching size is around 3.6 mm total length, and most major structural features, including the pectoral fin, first dorsal fin, second dorsal fin, and the branchiostegal rays, were formed when the larvae were between 7.7 and 9.1 mm. Much of the lateral line sensory system was formed when the larvae reached about 20 mm.

== Etymology ==
The genus name, Etheostoma, is from the Greek etheo meaning strain or filter and stoma meaning mouth. The species name, exile, also Greek, means slim or slender.
