= Black Lake Denesuline First Nation =

Community in Saskatchewan, Canada

- Band No. 359
- Tazen Tuwé
- Band symbol

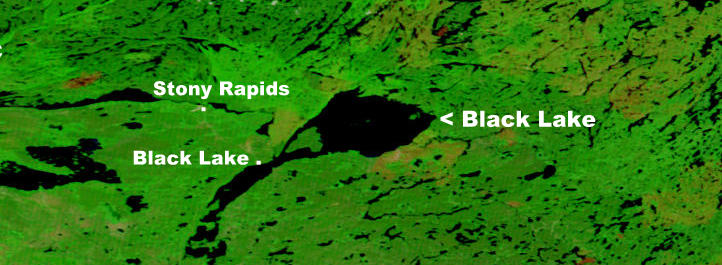
- Satellite image of Black Lake
- People: Chipewyan
- Treaty: Treaty 8
- Headquarters: Black Lake
- Province: Saskatchewan

Land
- Other reserves: Chicken 224; Chicken 225; Chicken 226
- Land area: 322.197 km^{2} (124.401 sq mi)

Population (2019)
- On reserve: 1638
- Off reserve: 617
- Total population: 2255

Government
- Chief: Coreen Sayazie

Tribal Council
- Prince Albert Grand Council

Website
- blacklakefirstnation.ca

Black Lake (Chipewyan: Tazen Tuwé) is a Denesuline First Nations band government in the boreal forest of northern Saskatchewan, Canada. It is located on the northwest shore of Black Lake where the Fond du Lac River leaves the lake to flow to Lake Athabasca.

It is the main administrative headquarters of the Black Lake Denesuline Nation Indian reserve with a land base of over 32,000 hectares (79,000 acres). Formerly, the Black Lake band used the name "Stony Rapids", which is now the name of a separate community 20 kilometres (12 mi) northwest and downstream on the Fond du Lac River, not on reserve land.

Black Lake from the air

== Black Lake Dene Nation ==
Black Lake Dene Nation is a band government with territory at three locations: Chicken 224, Chicken 225 and Chicken 226.

- Chicken 224 (59.1896°N 105.6353°W) is 25,819.40 hectares (63,801.1 acres). It includes the village of Black Lake (population 1,070 in 2011) and extends from Black Lake up to the border of the village of Stony Rapids and includes territory on both sides of the Fond du Lac River.
- Chicken 225 (59.287°N 105.7564°W) is 2,183.40 hectares (5,395.3 acres) (population 0 in 2011) on the north side of Stony Lake on the Fond du Lac River
- Chicken 226 (59.2158°N 104.9427°W) is 4,216.90 hectares (10,420.2 acres) on the eastern end of Black Lake

Black Lake First Nation had a total registered membership of 2,044 with 1,592 members residing on-reserve and 452 members residing at locations off-reserve in September, 2013. It is a member of the Prince Albert Grand Council.

== Demographics ==
The 2011 census reported 1,040 residents of Black Lake chose Dene as their mother tongue in 2011. All but 5 residents spoke English.

Canada census – Black Lake Denesuline First Nation community profile

	2011
Population	1,070 (-3.5% from 2006)
Land area	234.44 km^{2} (90.52 sq mi)
Population density	4.6/km^{2} (12/sq mi)
Median age	22.5 (M: 22.4, F: 22.8)
Private dwellings	234 (total)
Median household income

References: 2011

== Infrastructure ==
=== Transportation ===
Black Lake is accessible via road year round following the completion of secondary Highway 905 (previously a seasonal road). Black Lake is also accessible from the community of Stony Rapids (which is accessible by air) by road.

The community is served by air by Black Lake Water Aerodrome, and by Stony Rapids Airport.

=== Health care ===
The Athabasca Health Facility completed in 2003 at the cost of $12.7 million provides health care services to the Athabasca region. The hospital, located on reserve land (Chicken 224) adjacent to the northern hamlet of Stony Rapids, is part of the Athabasca Health Authority.

== Education ==
Father Porte Memorial School offers kindergarten to 12 and has an enrolment of 460 students.

== See also ==
- List of Indian reserves in Saskatchewan
- Treaty 8
