= Saskatchewan Highway 925 =

Provincial highway in Saskatchewan, Canada

Highway 925

Route information
- Maintained by Ministry of Highways and Infrastructure
- Length: 76 km (47 mi)

Major junctions
- South end: Highway 155 near Buffalo Narrows
- North end: Michel Village

Location
- Country: Canada
- Province: Saskatchewan

Highway system
- Provincial highways in Saskatchewan
← Highway 924	→ Highway 926

Highway 925 is an unpaved provincial highway in the far northern region of Saskatchewan, Canada. It begins about 10 kilometres (6.2 mi) south of Buffalo Narrows on Highway 155 and ends in Michel Village. It is about 76 kilometres (47 mi) long.

Highway 925 goes around the south and west side of Peter Pond Lake to reach Michel Village and passes near the communities of Dillon (Buffalo River) and St. George's Hill. In 2026, the Dillon River bridge carrying Highway 925 across the Dillon River had pier caps repaired at a cost of about $150,000.

== See also ==
- Roads in Saskatchewan
- Transportation in Saskatchewan
