= Dillon, Saskatchewan =

Unincorporated community in Saskatchewan, Canada

Dillon
- Location of Dillon in Saskatchewan
- Coordinates: 55°55′43″N 108°56′14″W
- Country: Canada
- Province: Saskatchewan

Government
  - Chief: Kelly Montgrand
  - MLA Athabasca: Leroy Laliberte
  - MP Desnethé—Missinippi—Churchill River: Buckley Belanger

Area
  - Total: 86.32 km^{2} (33.33 sq mi)

Population (2011)
  - Total: 764
  - Metro density: 8.9/km^{2} (23/sq mi)
- Time zone: UTC−6 (Central Standard Time)
  - Summer (DST): UTC−5
- Postal code: S0M 0S0
- Highways: Hwy 925

Dillon is an unincorporated community in the boreal forest of northern Saskatchewan, Canada. It is located on the western shore of Peter Pond Lake at the mouth of the Dillon River. The community is the administrative headquarters of the Buffalo River Dene Nation and is accessed by Highway 925 from Highway 155.

== History ==
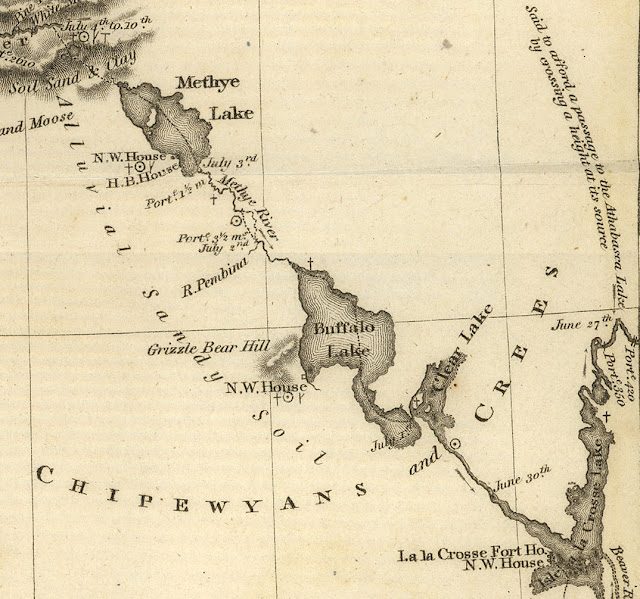
John Franklin's Coppermine Expedition map of 1819–1822 showing the fur trade route from Île-à-la-Crosse to Methye Portage

The North West Company had a post near Dillon in 1790. It was called Lac des Boeufs Post (Buffalo Lake Post). The Hudson's Bay Company had a temporary post nearby in 1791.

In 1819–1820 Sir John Franklin noted the position of the North West Company Post on Buffalo Lake (Peter Pond Lake) where Buffalo River (Dillon River) is located. (see map)

In 1903, the HBC post was re-established as an outpost of Ile-a-la-Crosse, becoming a full post in 1916. In 1935, the HBC relocated to the former Revillon Frères building.

The first post office opened under the name of Buffalo River in 1926 and closed in 1929. In 1954 the post office was re-opened under the name of Dillon.

In 1959, the HBC post became part of the Northern Stores Department. HBC divested this department in 1987 to The North West Company, which operated it as a Northern Store until its closure.

=== Name changes ===
In 1932 the name of the community was officially changed from Buffalo River to Dillon, the name of the river was changed from Buffalo River to Dillon River and Buffalo Lake was renamed Peter Pond Lake. A lake on the Dillon River just west of Vermette Lake also received its official name of Dillon Lake in 1932.

The source of the Dillon River is in Alberta east of Lake Winefred near co-ordinates 55.50°N 110.259°W.
