= Fond du Lac River (Saskatchewan) =

River in Saskatchewan, Canada

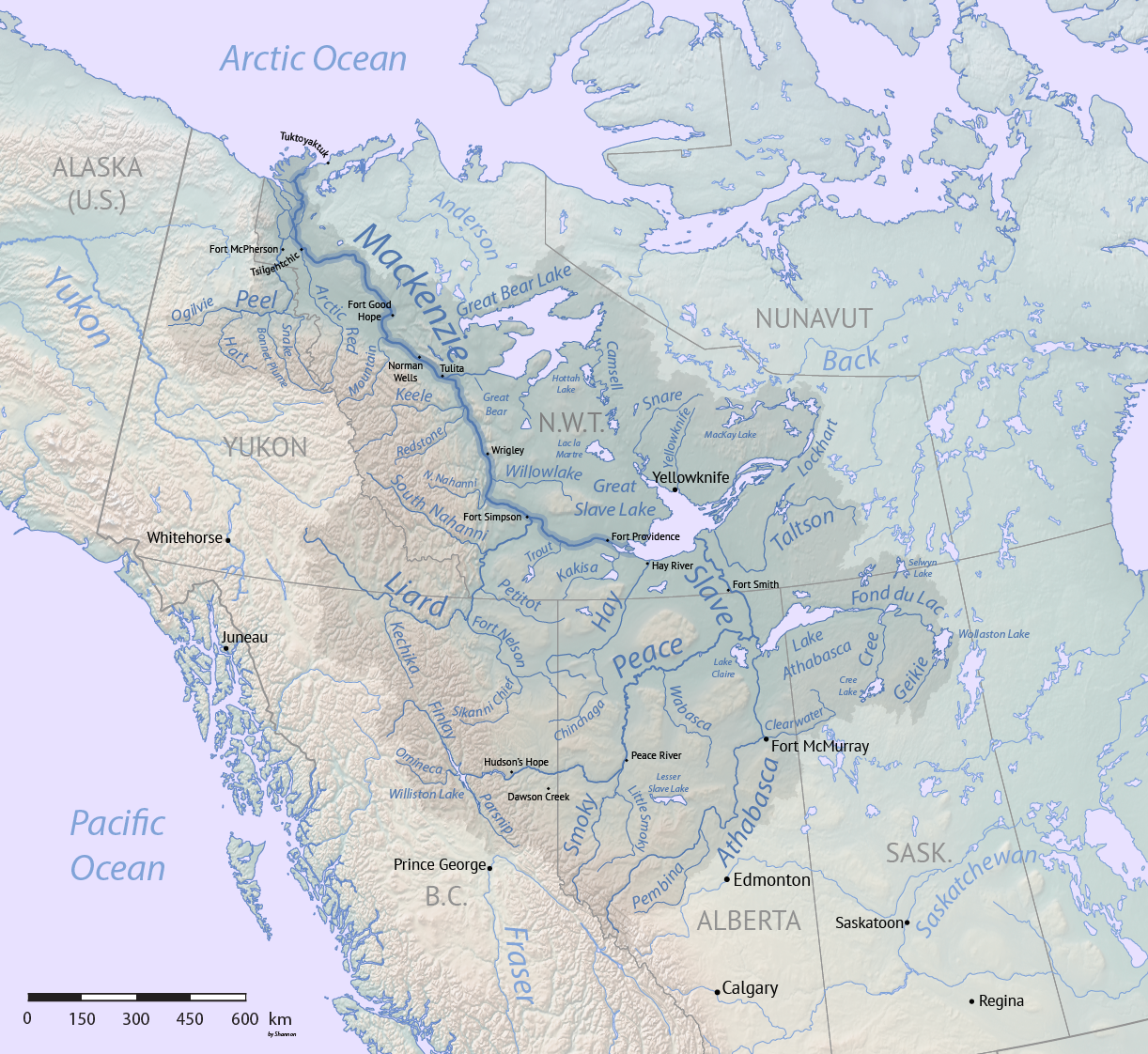
- Map of the Mackenzie River watershed

- Location of the mouth of the Fond du Lac River Fond du Lac River (Saskatchewan) (Canada)

Location
- Country: Canada
- Province: Saskatchewan

Physical characteristics
- Source: Wollaston Lake
  - coordinates: 58°27′48″N 103°32′20″W
  - elevation: 398 m (1,306 ft)
- Mouth: Lake Athabasca
  - coordinates: 59°16′20″N 106°00′00″W
  - elevation: 213 m (699 ft)
- Length: 277 km (172 mi)
- Basin size: 66,800 km^{2} (25,800 sq mi)
- Discharge
  - average: 300 m^{3}/s (11,000 cu ft/s)

Basin features
- River system: Mackenzie River
- Tributaries
  - left: Waterfound River; Hawkrock River; Cree River
  - right: Perch River; Porcupine River; Chipman River; Souter River
- Waterbodies: Hatchet Lake; Black Lake
- Waterfalls: Elizabeth Falls

The Fond du Lac River is one of the upper branches of the Mackenzie River system, draining into the Arctic Ocean, located in Northern Saskatchewan, Canada. The river is 277 kilometres (172 mi) long, has a watershed of 66,800 km^{2} (25,800 sq mi), and its mean discharge is 300 m^{3}/s (11,000 cu ft/s).

== Hydrology ==
The river begins at an elevation of 395 metres (1,296 ft) at Cunning Bay on Wollaston Lake. It flows north to Hatchet Lake at an elevation of 393 metres (1,289 ft) and continues to Waterfound Bay at an elevation of 376 metres (1,234 ft), where the tributary Waterfound River enters from the left. The river continues north to Kosdaw Lake at an elevation of 364 metres (1,194 ft), over the Redbank Falls to Otter Lake, the Manitou Falls, the Brink Rapids and the Brassy Rapids, before the Hawkrock River enters from the left. It continues over the Hawkrock Rapids and the North Rapids and takes in the Perch River from the right. The Fond du Lac River flows further over the Perch Rapids, takes in the Porcupine River from the right, travels over the Burr Falls, and enters Black Lake at an elevation of 276 metres (906 ft).

Several tributaries enter at Black Lake: from the right, the Chipman River and the Souter River; and from the left, the Cree River.

The river leaves the lake on the northwest side near the community of Black Lake, travels over the Elizabeth Falls and the Woodcock Rapids, flows past the community of Stony Rapids, and reaches its mouth at Lake Athabasca.

== Fish species ==
The river also supports a number of fish species. These include walleye, yellow perch, northern pike, lake trout, Arctic grayling, lake whitefish, cisco, white sucker, longnose sucker, and burbot.

A record 1.96-kilogram (4.3 lb) Arctic grayling was caught in the river in 1966.

== See also ==
- List of rivers of Saskatchewan
