= Stony Rapids =

Community in Saskatchewan, Canada

Stony Rapids Deschaghe ᐊᓯᓃᐏ ᐹᐏᐢᑎᑯᕽ asinîwi-pâwistikohk
- Northern hamlet
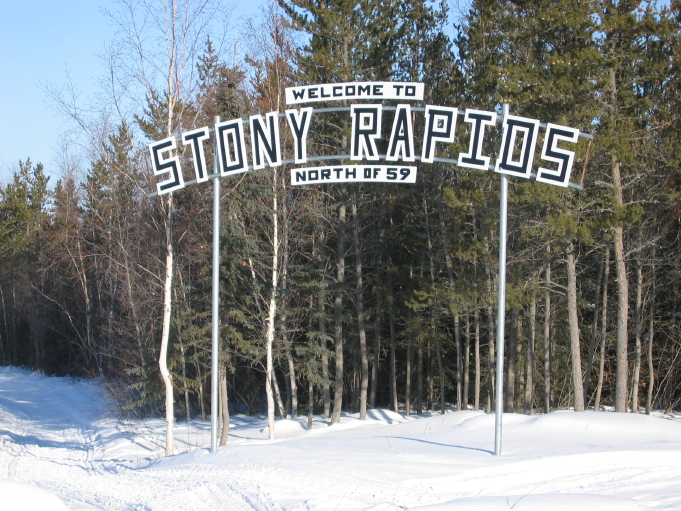
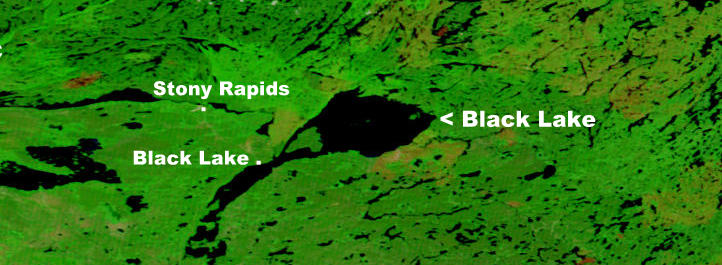
- Stony Rapids Sign NASA map of Stony Rapids

- Location of Stony Rapids in Saskatchewan
- Coordinates: 59°15′16.99″N 105°50′18.99″W
- Country: Canada
- Province: Saskatchewan
- Post office established: 1937

Government
  - Mayor: Daniel Powder
  - MLA Athabasca Town Counsellor: Leroy Laliberte Tyrel Duff, Kirk McDonald, Terri-Lynn Beavereye, Mervin McDonald
  - MP Desnethé—Missinippi—Churchill River: Buckley Belanger, Liberal

Area
  - Total: 3.96 km^{2} (1.53 sq mi)

Population (2011)
  - Total: 243
  - Density: 61/km^{2} (160/sq mi)
- Time zone: UTC−6 (Central Standard Time)
  - Summer (DST): UTC−5
- Postal code: S0J 2R8

Stony Rapids (Chipewyan: Deschaghe, lit. 'settlement on the other side of the Rapids'; Woods Cree: ᐊᓯᓃᐏ ᐹᐏᐢᑎᑯᕽ, romanized: asinîwi-pâwistikohk, lit. 'stones in these rapids (locative)') is a northern hamlet in Northern Saskatchewan, Canada. It is located 82 kilometres (51 mi) south of the border with the Northwest Territories, along the Fond du Lac River. This river connects the community to Fond-du-Lac, Uranium City and Camsell Portage.

== Demographics ==
In the 2021 Census of Population conducted by Statistics Canada, Stony Rapids had a population of 219 living in 75 of its 132 total private dwellings, a change of −16.4% from its 2016 population of 262. With a land area of 4.24 km^{2} (1.64 sq mi), it had a population density of 51.7/km^{2} (133.8/sq mi) in 2021.

== Transportation ==
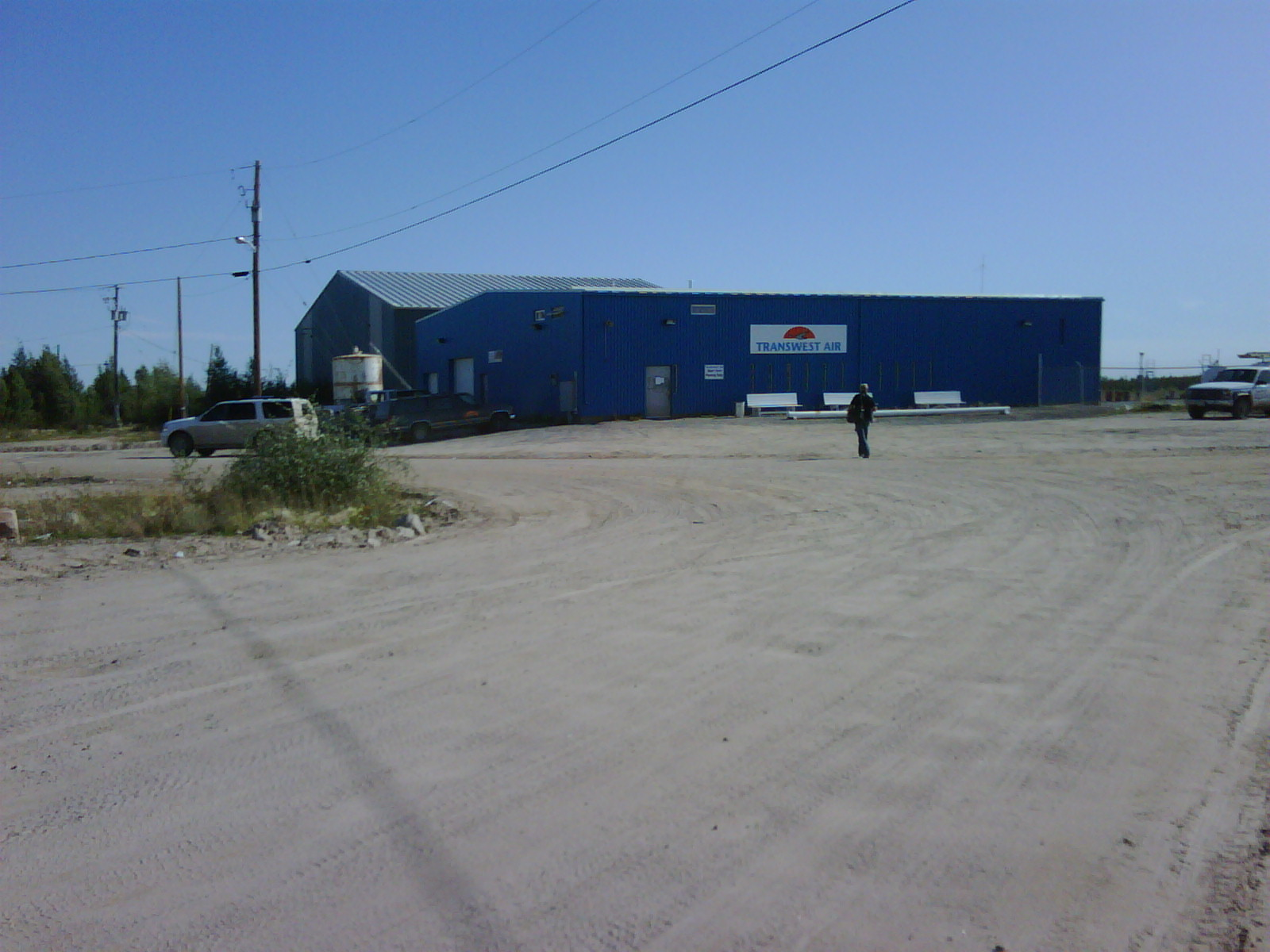
Stony Rapids Air Terminal

Saskatchewan Highway 905 runs from Highway 102 to Stony Rapids. The highway is approximately 469 km (291 mi) long and is entirely unpaved. A 185 km (115 mi) section between Points North Landing and Black Lake is a seasonal winter road.

A winter ice road connects Fond-du-Lac and Uranium City. There is an all-season road to the community of Black Lake, 20 kilometres (12 mi) southeast. Like most northern communities, Stony Rapids relies on its Stony Rapids Airport and Stony Rapids Water Aerodrome for vital transportation.

== Health care ==
The Athabasca Health Facility completed in 2003 at the cost of $12.7 million provides health care services to the Athabasca region. The hospital, located on reserve land (Chicken 224) of the Black Lake Dene Nation adjacent to Stony Rapids, is part of the Athabasca Health Authority.

== Climate ==
Stony Rapids has a subarctic climate (Köppen Dfc) with long, severe winters and short, mild to warm summers. Winters are long, cold and snowy, with snow depth peaking at around 0.6 metres or 24 inches, reaching an extreme depth of 1.09 metres or 43 inches on 22 January 1991 and usually melting in mid-May. Unlike towns further west, temperature above 0 °C (32 °F) are very rare during winter, occurring on average only 1.5 times from December to February. Snowfall is steady from October to April, totalling on average 2.34 metres (92.1 in) and an extreme daily fall of 0.31 metres (12.2 in) on 16 March 1995.

Summers are mild to warm with frequent light rain, although 3.4 days per summer reach 30 °C or 86 °F. The average frost-free period is eighty-one days from 9 June to 30 August, though temperatures below 0 °C (32 °F) have occurred a handful of times in July.

The highest temperature ever recorded in Stony Rapids was 39.8 °C (103.6 °F) on 30 June 2021. The coldest temperature ever recorded was −50.6 °C (−59 °F) on 26 January 1966 and 13 January 1972.

Climate data for Stony Rapids Airport, 1981−2010 normals, extremes 1960−present
Month	Jan	Feb	Mar	Apr	May	Jun	Jul	Aug	Sep	Oct	Nov	Dec	Year
Record high °C (°F)	5.4 (41.7)	8.0 (46.4)	17.2 (63.0)	22.2 (72.0)	33.1 (91.6)	39.8 (103.6)	38.5 (101.3)	35.7 (96.3)	30.6 (87.1)	23.5 (74.3)	10.0 (50.0)	3.9 (39.0)	39.8 (103.6)
Mean daily maximum °C (°F)	−19.5 (−3.1)	−15.1 (4.8)	−6.6 (20.1)	3.8 (38.8)	12.1 (53.8)	19.9 (67.8)	22.7 (72.9)	20.3 (68.5)	12.7 (54.9)	3.3 (37.9)	−8.2 (17.2)	−16.4 (2.5)	2.4 (36.3)
Daily mean °C (°F)	−24.8 (−12.6)	−21.2 (−6.2)	−14.1 (6.6)	−3.0 (26.6)	5.6 (42.1)	12.9 (55.2)	15.9 (60.6)	14.0 (57.2)	7.5 (45.5)	−0.5 (31.1)	−12.4 (9.7)	−21.4 (−6.5)	−3.5 (25.7)
Mean daily minimum °C (°F)	−30.0 (−22.0)	−27.4 (−17.3)	−21.6 (−6.9)	−9.9 (14.2)	−1.0 (30.2)	5.8 (42.4)	9.1 (48.4)	7.7 (45.9)	2.4 (36.3)	−4.3 (24.3)	−16.7 (1.9)	−26.2 (−15.2)	−9.3 (15.3)
Record low °C (°F)	−50.6 (−59.1)	−48.9 (−56.0)	−46.1 (−51.0)	−38.9 (−38.0)	−18.3 (−0.9)	−5.0 (23.0)	−1.1 (30.0)	−2.8 (27.0)	−11.1 (12.0)	−24.4 (−11.9)	−45.6 (−50.1)	−48.2 (−54.8)	−50.6 (−59.1)
Average precipitation mm (inches)	19.3 (0.76)	15.3 (0.60)	20.6 (0.81)	18.9 (0.74)	32.0 (1.26)	45.6 (1.80)	62.4 (2.46)	70.3 (2.77)	59.3 (2.33)	34.6 (1.36)	30.1 (1.19)	17.8 (0.70)	426.2 (16.78)
Average rainfall mm (inches)	0.1 (0.00)	0.0 (0.0)	0.4 (0.02)	5.2 (0.20)	22.5 (0.89)	45.5 (1.79)	62.4 (2.46)	70.3 (2.77)	57.2 (2.25)	16.7 (0.66)	1.7 (0.07)	0.3 (0.01)	282.3 (11.12)
Average snowfall cm (inches)	35.3 (13.9)	27.5 (10.8)	30.9 (12.2)	20.2 (8.0)	12.2 (4.8)	0.1 (0.0)	0.0 (0.0)	0.0 (0.0)	2.8 (1.1)	25.0 (9.8)	48.2 (19.0)	32.2 (12.7)	234.4 (92.3)
Average precipitation days (≥ 0.2 mm)	12.7	10.6	10.1	7.5	10.2	11.1	13.7	14.6	14.4	14.8	14.6	12.0	146.3
Average rainy days (≥ 0.2 mm)	0.17	0.04	0.64	2.6	8.3	11.1	13.7	14.6	13.9	7.5	1.0	0.63	74.2
Average snowy days (≥ 0.2 cm)	15.8	13.7	12.0	6.4	3.6	0.1	0.0	0.04	1.6	10.4	17.8	16.3	97.7
Source: Environment Canada

== See also ==
- List of communities in Saskatchewan
