= Saskatchewan Highway 905 =

Provincial highway in Saskatchewan, Canada

Highway 905

Route information
- Maintained by Ministry of Highways and Infrastructure
- Length: 469 km (291 mi)
- History: Formerly Hwy 105

Major junctions
- South end: CanAm Highway / Highway 102 near Southend
- Highway 955 near Black Lake
- North end: Stony Rapids

Location
- Country: Canada
- Province: Saskatchewan

Highway system
- Provincial highways in Saskatchewan
| ← Highway 904 | → Highway 908 |

Highway 905 is a provincial highway in the far north region of the Canadian province of Saskatchewan. It runs from the CanAm Highway (Highway 102) to Stony Rapids. It is about 469 kilometres (291 mi) long and is entirely unpaved.

== History ==
Highway 905 was originally designated as Highway 105, but was renumbered in the early 1980s as part of the establishment of the 900-series highways. In the late 1990s, the winter road between Points North Landing Black Lake was constructed, resulting Highway 964 being renumbered and Highway 905 ending at Stony Rapids.

== Route description ==
Highway 905 begins at Highway 102, about 22 kilometres (14 mi) southwest of Southend. The highway heads in a northerly direction passing by, and providing access to, Davin Lake Recreation Site, Courtenay Lake Recreation Site, Geikie River Recreation Site, Wollaston Lake Barge Ferry at Hidden Bay on Wollaston Lake, and Wollaston Lake Recreation Site before coming to an intersection with a road that goes to Rabbit Lake mine and Collins Bay on Wollaston Lake. This intersection is about 242 kilometres (150 mi) from Highway 102.

After this intersection, Highway 905 takes a northwesterly route, passing through Points North Landing about 33 kilometres (21 mi) from the intersection, and continues to the former Highway 964 near Black Lake. From there, it heads west to Stony Rapids, which is only 82 kilometres (51 mi) south of the Northwest Territories border.

Points North Landing is about 297 kilometres (185 mi) north of Southend and marks where the road used to end. Points North Landing serves as a permanent camp providing services for the many exploration companies searching for uranium in the area. It is also the location of Points North Landing Airport.

== See also ==
- Roads in Saskatchewan
- Transportation in Saskatchewan
