= Black Lake (Saskatchewan) =

Lake in Saskatchewan, Canada

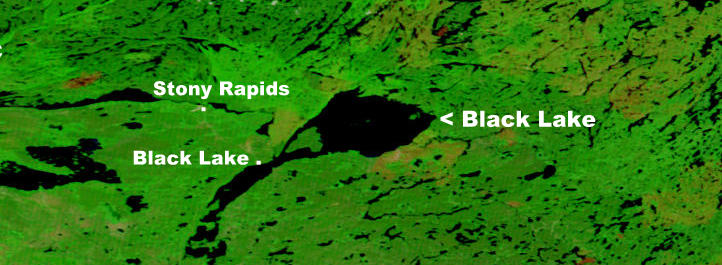
- NASA map showing Black Lake

- Location of Black Lake in Saskatchewan Black Lake (Canada)
- Location: Northern Administration District, Saskatchewan
- Coordinates: 59°12′00″N 105°15′02″W
- Lake type: Glacial lake
- Part of: Mackenzie River drainage basin
- Primary inflows: Chipman River; Cree River; Fond du Lac River; Souter River
- Primary outflows: Fond du Lac River
- Basin countries: Canada
- Max. length: 55 km (34 mi)
- Max. width: 17 km (11 mi)
- Surface area: 464 km^{2} (179 sq mi)
- Surface elevation: 276 m (906 ft)
- Islands: Fir Island; Pick Island
- Settlements: Black Lake

Black Lake is a glacial lake in the Mackenzie River drainage basin in northern Saskatchewan, Canada. It is about 55 kilometres (34 mi) long, 17 kilometres (11 mi) wide, has an area of 464 km^{2} (179 sq mi), and lies at an elevation of 281 metres (922 ft). The primary inflows are the Chipman River, Cree River, Fond du Lac River, and Souter River; the primary outflow is Fond du Lac River, which flows via the Mackenzie River into the Arctic Ocean.

The community of Black Lake is located on the northwest shore of the lake, near where the Fond du Lac River exits.

== Fish species ==
The fish species in the lake include walleye, yellow perch, northern pike, lake trout, Arctic grayling, lake whitefish, cisco, white sucker, longnose sucker, and burbot.

== See also ==
- List of lakes of Saskatchewan
