= Winefred Lake =

Lake in Alberta, Canada

- Location within Alberta
- Location: Wood Buffalo, Alberta
- Coordinates: 55°29′49″N 110°32′12″W
- Primary outflows: Winefred River
- Basin countries: Canada
- Max. length: 15 km (9.3 mi)
- Max. width: 10 km (6.2 mi)
- Surface area: 122.8 km^{2} (47.4 sq mi)
- Average depth: 8.7 m (29 ft)
- Max. depth: 15.3 m (50 ft)
- Surface elevation: 594 m (1,949 ft)

Winefred Lake is a large lake in east-northern Alberta, Canada. It is located in southern Wood Buffalo, in a remote area between Cold Lake and Fort McMurray, and has a total area of 122.8 km^{2} (47.4 sq mi). The closest community is the hamlet of Conklin, at 70 km (43 mi).

Ecologically, the lake is set in boreal forest and muskeg environment, with frequent saline water degeneration of the groundwater flow. Winefred lake is drained through Winefred River (Alberta) into Christina River (Alberta) and then in Clearwater River to the Athabasca River.

Winefred Lake is known for fishing, having produced trophy size Northern Pike and Walleye. Hunting is also done around the lake, with moose and deer hunting, as well as trapping.

The 4.53 km^{2} (1.75 sq mi) Winefred Lake Indian Reserve of the Chipewyan Prairie First Nation is established on the northern shore of the lake.

== See also ==
- Lakes of Alberta
