= Waskesiu =

Waskesiu means elk or red deer in Cree and may refer to:

- Waskesiu Lake, Saskatchewan, a community in Saskatchewan, Canada
- Waskesiu Lake, a lake in Saskatchewan, Canada
- Waskesiu River, a river in Saskatchewan, Canada
- Waskesiu Hills, a plateau in Saskatchewan, Canada
