= List of historic places in Saskatchewan =

This article is a list of historic places in the province of Saskatchewan entered on the Canadian Register of Historic Places, whether they are federal, provincial, or municipal.

== List of historic places ==
Name	Address	Coordinates	Government recognition (CRHP №)	Wikidata ID	Image
Abbey Fire Hall	322 Cathedral Avenue; Abbey SK	50°44′05″N 108°45′25″W	Abbey municipality (6152)		Upload Photo
Abernethy and District Memorial Hall	Main Street; Abernethy SK	50°44′43″N 103°25′05″W	Abernethy municipality (5516)		Upload Photo
Barn	Abernethy SK	50°43′13″N 103°25′30″W	Federal (3341)	Q131905314	More images
Christ Anglican Church	Abernethy SK	50°44′51″N 103°25′12″W	Abernethy municipality (1981)		Upload Photo
Motherwell Homestead National Historic Site of Canada	Highway 22; Abernethy SK	50°43′13″N 103°25′30″W	Federal (1209)	Q3139694	More images
Stone House Classified Federal Heritage Building	Abernethy SK	50°43′13″N 103°25′30″W	Federal (3342)		
Wood/Gibson Residence	Main Street; Alameda SK	49°15′57″N 102°16′48″W	Alameda municipality (4079)		Upload Photo
Paroisse St. Jacques D’Albertville	Albertville SK	53°30′35″N 105°33′50″W	Albertville municipality (11486)		Upload Photo
The Alsask School	Alsask SK	51°22′33″N 109°59′31″W	Alsask municipality (3783)		Upload Photo
Arcola Court House on Souris Avenue	619 Souris Avenue; Arcola SK	49°38′14″N 102°29′02″W	Arcola municipality (7504)		Upload Photo
Arcola Town Hall	21 Main Street; Arcola SK	49°38′05″N 102°29′31″W	Arcola municipality (1309)		Upload Photo
Land Titles Office	301 Main Street; Arcola SK	49°38′11″N 102°29′31″W	Arcola municipality (1303)	Q6483985	Upload Photo
Law Office Building	114 Main Street; Arcola SK	49°39′06″N 103°21′54″W	Arcola municipality (1308)		Upload Photo
Pharmacy Building	107 Main Street; Arcola SK	49°38′02″N 102°29′31″W	Arcola municipality (1304)		Upload Photo
Assiniboia Court House	700 Centre Street; Assiniboia SK	49°37′42″N 105°59′35″W	Saskatchewan (3100)		
Kristiania Lutheran Church	Atwater SK	50°46′42″N 102°13′34″W	Atwater municipality (6611)		Upload Photo
CNR Station House and Grounds	219 Railway Avenue; Avonlea SK	50°00′49″N 105°03′38″W	Federal (2573)		Upload Photo
Balgonie United Church	137 Lewis Street; Balgonie SK	50°29′26″N 104°15′58″W	Balgonie municipality (1983)		Upload Photo
Batoche National Historic Site of Canada	PO Box 999; Batoche SK	52°45′14″N 106°06′58″W	Federal (14598)	Q810869	More images
Former Jean Caron Sr. House	Batoche SK	52°45′14″N 106°07′01″W	Federal (4684)		
St. Antoine de Padoue Church	Batoche National Historic Site of Canada; Batoche SK	52°45′08″N 106°07′03″W	Federal (15526)		
St. Antoine de Padoue Rectory	Batoche National Historic Site of Canada; Batoche SK	52°45′14″N 106°07′01″W	Federal (4762)		
Jax Theatre	141 First Avenue West; Bengough SK	51°11′43″N 105°08′02″W	Bengough municipality (6626)		Upload Photo
Gillis Blakley Bethune and District Heritage Museum	519 East Street; Bethune SK	50°42′44″N 105°12′18″W	Bethune municipality (5824)		Upload Photo
Train/Caboose Lot	Railway Ave; Bienfait SK	49°08′40″N 102°48′29″W	Bienfait municipality (2569)		
Biggar Railway Station (Grand Trunk Pacific) National Historic Site of Canada	Biggar SK	52°04′00″N 108°00′00″W	Federal (13347, (4579)	Q3095988	More images
CN Station Building	329 Railway Avenue; Blaine Lake SK	52°49′56″N 106°52′59″W	Blaine Lake municipality (3003)		
Doukhobor Prayer Home	318 Main Street; Blaine Lake SK	52°49′46″N 106°52′48″W	Blaine Lake municipality (16285)		Upload Photo
St. Andrew's Roman Catholic Church	102 2nd Avenue E Blaine Lake SK	52°35′41″N 109°16′52″W	Blaine Lake municipality (11692)		Upload Photo
Borden Hotel / Model-T Bar & Grill	301 Railway Avenue; Borden SK	52°24′14″N 107°14′29″W	Borden municipality (20225)		Upload Photo
Turtle Lake School	202 Main Street; Borden SK	52°24′18″N 107°14′24″W	Borden municipality (9244)		Upload Photo
Peachey House	305 Railway Avenue; Briercrest SK	50°10′03″N 105°15′58″W	Briercrest municipality (13867)		Upload Photo
Former Canadian Pacific Railway Station	Front St. (at 6th Ave. (Highway 605)); Broadview SK	50°22′44″N 102°34′44″W	Federal (4563)	Q4972335	More images
Old Fire Hall and Jail	525 Main Street; Bruno SK	52°15′52″N 105°31′23″W	Bruno municipality (9258)		Upload Photo
Ukrainian Greek Orthodox Church of St. John the Baptist	607 1st Avenue West; Buchanan SK	51°42′19″N 102°45′27″W	Buchanan municipality (16372)		Upload Photo
The Anglican Church Property	312-1st Street South; Cabri SK	50°37′02″N 108°27′36″W	Cabri municipality (2372)		Upload Photo
Holy Trinity Ukrainian Greek Orthodox Church	710 Main Street; Canora SK	51°37′53″N 102°26′17″W	Canora municipality (5813)		Upload Photo
The Nicholas Lewchuk Property	316 Barschel Avenue; Canora SK	51°37′50″N 102°25′34″W	Canora municipality (6466)		Upload Photo
Holy Trinity Anglican Church	Pacific Avenue; Carievale SK	49°10′31″N 101°37′37″W	Carievale municipality (2499)		Upload Photo
Rabeau Building	616 Railway Avenue; Carnduff SK	49°10′29″N 101°47′31″W	Carnduff municipality (1532)		Upload Photo
Old Masonic Lodge	272 Main Street; Central Butte SK	50°47′40″N 106°30′22″W	Central Butte municipality (11918)		Upload Photo
Bank of Toronto Building	414 4th Street; Chaplin SK	50°27′46″N 106°39′25″W	Chaplin municipality (5557)		Upload Photo
Conquest United Church	229 Bounty Street; Conquest SK	51°31′45″N 107°14′38″W	Conquest municipality (1523)		Upload Photo
Craik Town Hall	Corner of First Avenue & 3rd Street; Craik SK	51°02′51″N 105°49′16″W	Craik municipality (5819)		
Prairie Pioneer Museum	541 Parks Road; Craik SK	51°03′06″N 105°49′08″W	Craik municipality (5825)		Upload Photo
Cudworth Museum (former CN station)	1st Avenue; Cudworth SK	52°29′23″N 105°43′50″W	Cudworth municipality (9252)		
Cumberland House Provincial Park	Cumberland House SK	53°57′34″N 102°15′54″W	Federal (1139), Saskatchewan (3111)	Q5193910	More images
St. Lucy's Anglican Church	Gladstone Street; Dilke SK	50°52′01″N 105°15′11″W	Dilke municipality (5820)		Upload Photo
All Saints Anglican Church	7th Street E at 1st Ave S Duck Lake SK	52°48′49″N 106°14′07″W	Duck Lake municipality (4060)	Q4729396	Upload Photo
Almighty Voice Jailhouse	5 Anderson Avenue; Duck Lake SK	52°48′59″N 106°13′05″W	Duck Lake municipality (1538)		Upload Photo
Battle of Duck Lake National Historic Site of Canada	Duck Lake SK	52°49′00″N 106°13′59″W	Federal (12916)	Q18538537	Upload Photo
Victoria School	Victoria Avenue & 3rd Street; Duck Lake SK	52°48′50″N 106°13′44″W	Duck Lake municipality (3315)		Upload Photo
39 / Recreational Hall	Dundurn Military Camp; Dundurn SK	51°50′51″N 106°33′43″W	Federal (13543)		Upload Photo
Dundurn United Church	300 2nd Street; Dundurn SK	51°48′40″N 106°30′22″W	Dundurn municipality (5565)		Upload Photo
Old Bank Building	400 2nd Street; Dundurn SK	51°48′38″N 106°30′18″W	Dundurn municipality (5566)		Upload Photo
Old Brick School	Third Avenue; Dundurn SK	51°48′39″N 106°30′36″W	Dundurn municipality (5567)		Upload Photo
Dysart School	209 Wark Street; Dysart SK	50°56′46″N 104°02′10″W	Dysart municipality (7061)		Upload Photo
Royal Bank Building	109 Main Street; Dysart SK	50°56′39″N 104°02′16″W	Dysart municipality (7063)		Upload Photo
St. George Romanian Orthodox Church	201 Mckendre Street; Dysart SK	50°56′45″N 104°02′20″W	Dysart municipality (7070)		Upload Photo
Old Town Office	102 Maple Avenue S Eastend SK	49°30′43″N 108°49′08″W	Eastend municipality (1957)		Upload Photo
Stegner Residence	126 Tamarack Avenue; Eastend SK	49°31′01″N 108°49′34″W	Eastend municipality (1543)		
Eatonia Heritage Park	100 Railway Avenue; Eatonia SK	51°13′16″N 109°23′33″W	Eatonia municipality (4476)		
Canadian National Railways Station	Railway Avenue; Edam SK	53°11′18″N 108°46′07″W	Edam municipality (9259)		
Edam Café	937 East Railway Avenue; Edam SK	53°11′21″N 108°46′01″W	Edam municipality (9250)		More images
Elfros Union Church	Elfros Street; Elfros SK	51°44′31″N 103°51′58″W	Elfros municipality (4965)		Upload Photo
Elrose Brick School	12 Fourth Avenue East; Elrose SK	51°11′59″N 108°01′48″W	Elrose municipality (7845)		Upload Photo
Ernest Lindner Studio on Fairy Island	Emma Lake SK	53°37′31″N 105°56′35″W	Saskatchewan (10429)		
St. James Anglican Church	1st Street S Endeavour SK	52°09′30″N 102°39′24″W	Endeavour municipality (16375)		Upload Photo
Ernfold School	Ernfold SK	50°26′57″N 106°53′28″W	Ernfold municipality (5555)		Upload Photo
Esterhazy Flour Mill	517 Smith-Dorrien Street; Esterhazy SK	50°32′27″N 101°50′31″W	Federal (14963), Saskatchewan (10427)	Q3315612	More images
Estevan Court House	1016 Fourth Street; Estevan SK	49°08′21″N 102°59′31″W	Saskatchewan (4087)		
Wood End North West Mounted Police Post	118 4th Street; Estevan SK	49°07′54″N 102°58′23″W	Estevan municipality (2681)		Upload Photo
Evans House	946 2nd Street South East; Eston SK	51°08′44″N 108°44′53″W	Eston municipality (11914)		Upload Photo
Battle of Tourond's Coulee / Fish Creek National Historic Site of Canada	Fish Creek SK	52°31′47″N 106°08′17″W	Federal (14085)	Q5454500	More images
Fleming Grain Elevator	South Railway Street; Fleming SK	50°04′38″N 101°30′43″W	Saskatchewan (10432)		Upload Photo
Fleming Lake of the Woods Grain Elevator National Historic Site of Canada	Fleming SK	50°04′31″N 101°30′43″W	Federal (12141)		Upload Photo
Fleming Memorial Cemetery	Fleming SK	50°04′49″N 101°29′42″W	Fleming municipality (7001)		Upload Photo
Foam Lake Museum	133 Bray Avenue West; Foam Lake SK	51°38′34″N 103°32′06″W	Foam Lake municipality (4972)		Upload Photo
St. John the Evangelist Anglican Church	320 Main Street; Foam Lake SK	51°38′30″N 103°32′01″W	Foam Lake municipality (4971)	Q7588985	Upload Photo
Fort Qu'Appelle National Historic Site of Canada	198 Bay Avenue North; Fort Qu'Appelle SK	50°46′17″N 103°47′52″W	Federal (18988)	Q23694812	More images
Grand Trunk Pacific Railway Station	Highway 10; Fort Qu'Appelle SK	50°45′44″N 103°47′38″W	Fort Qu'Appelle municipality (4884)	Q5471880	More images
Hospital, Indian Services	Broad Street; Fort Qu'Appelle SK	50°45′57″N 103°47′17″W	Federal (4695)		
Echo Valley Conference Centre (Fort San)	Fort San SK	50°47′45″N 103°48′43″W	Fort San municipality (13889)		Upload Photo
Public School	Fox Valley SK	50°28′00″N 109°28′59″W	Fox Valley municipality (4147)		
Frenchman Butte National Historic Site of Canada	Frenchman Butte SK	53°37′38″N 109°34′34″W	Federal (14509)	Q2414622	More images
Christ Church	205 Bruce Street; Gainsborough SK	49°10′32″N 101°26′56″W	Gainsborough municipality (1296)	Q130551541	More images
Girvin Pump House	Girvin SK	51°03′01″N 105°49′08″W	Girvin municipality (4215)		Upload Photo
Glenside United Church	NW corner of Main Street and Saskatchewan Avenue; Glenside SK	51°27′06″N 106°48′11″W	Glenside municipality (3780)		Upload Photo
Goodsoil Historical Museum Site	Main Street; Goodsoil SK	54°24′09″N 109°13′41″W	Goodsoil municipality (6999)		Upload Photo
Bishop's Residence	112 1st Avenue W Gravelbourg SK	49°52′21″N 106°33′29″W	Gravelbourg municipality (1541)		Upload Photo
Canadian National Railway Station Building	701 Main Street N Gravelbourg SK	49°52′43″N 106°33′27″W	Gravelbourg municipality (8531)	Q23661745	More images
College Mathieu Pavillion	1st Avenue East at Magnan Street; Gravelbourg SK	49°52′20″N 106°32′53″W	Gravelbourg municipality (8402)		Upload Photo
Court House	209 Main Street; Gravelbourg SK	49°52′27″N 106°33′26″W	Gravelbourg municipality (7510)		
Elementary School	240 1st Ave; Gravelbourg SK	49°52′18″N 106°33′36″W	Gravelbourg municipality (7052)		Upload Photo
Gaiety Theatre	412 Main Street; Gravelbourg SK	49°52′35″N 106°33′25″W	Gravelbourg municipality (7058)	Q38282252	More images
Gravelbourg Post Office	402 Main Street; Gravelbourg SK	49°52′33″N 106°33′25″W	Gravelbourg municipality (8530)	Q130384480	More images
La Cathédrale	116 1st Avenue W Gravelbourg SK	49°52′22″N 106°33′25″W	Federal (11188), Gravelbourg municipality (2011)	Q7110757	More images
Adare House	711 Wolseley Avenue; Grenfell SK	50°24′39″N 102°55′44″W	Grenfell municipality (4961)		
Windsor Block	1103 Front Avenue; Grenfell SK	50°24′47″N 102°55′51″W	Grenfell municipality (4960)		
I.O.O.F. Lodge	3372 Rutland Avenue; Gull Lake SK	50°05′41″N 108°28′59″W	Gull Lake municipality (2374)		Upload Photo
St. Andrew's United Church	Halifax St; Halbrite SK	49°29′17″N 103°33′22″W	Halbrite municipality (3390)		Upload Photo
Harris United Church	204 2nd Avenue N Harris SK	51°44′02″N 107°34′48″W	Harris municipality (4823)		Upload Photo
Old Harris CNR Water Tower	208 Railway Avenue N Harris SK	51°44′06″N 107°34′59″W	Harris municipality (1990)		Upload Photo
Royal Bank of Canada	116 Main Street; Harris SK	51°44′03″N 107°34′59″W	Harris municipality (4821)		Upload Photo
St. Brigitte Roman Catholic Church	215 Main Street; Harris SK	51°44′00″N 107°34′55″W	Harris municipality (4822)		
The Rural Municipality of Harris #316 Office	Main Street; Harris SK	51°44′03″N 107°34′59″W	Harris municipality (4820)		
Canadian Imperial Bank of Commerce	Gladstone Street near Chester Avenue; Hawarden SK	51°24′49″N 106°36′06″W	Hawarden municipality (16243)		Upload Photo
Christ Anglican Church	William Street between Chester and Railway Avenues; Hawarden SK	51°24′53″N 106°36′04″W	Hawarden municipality (16244)		Upload Photo
Hazenmore Community Church	Hazenmore SK	49°41′12″N 107°08′06″W	Hazenmore municipality (2244)		Upload Photo
St. James Anglican Church	Phair Avenue; Hazenmore SK	49°41′12″N 107°08′07″W	Hazenmore municipality (2215)		
Hepburn School	Main Street & Second Street E Hepburn SK	52°31′31″N 106°43′26″W	Hepburn municipality (11531)		Upload Photo
Station Grounds of the Canadian Northern Railway Company	Hepburn SK	52°31′32″N 106°43′55″W	Hepburn municipality (11532)		Upload Photo
Hall Residence	431 Dennis Street; Herbert SK	50°25′48″N 107°13′19″W	Herbert municipality (5777)		Upload Photo
Klassen Museum	801 Herbert Avenue; Herbert SK	50°25′35″N 107°13′26″W	Herbert municipality (6143)		Upload Photo
St. Patrick's Roman Catholic Church	507 Shaw Street; Herbert SK	50°25′51″N 107°13′08″W	Herbert municipality (6142)		Upload Photo
Stone Church on Whyte Street	Whyte Street; Heward SK	49°44′12″N 103°09′00″W	Heward municipality (1953)		Upload Photo
Hudson Bay School	508 & 510 Churchill Street; Hudson Bay SK	52°51′22″N 102°23′24″W	Hudson Bay municipality (3788)		Upload Photo
Canadian National Railways (Canadian Northern Railway) Station	5th Avenue (at 9th St.); Humboldt SK	52°11′53″N 105°07′26″W	Federal (4560)	Q5940454	More images
Humboldt Post Office National Historic Site of Canada	Humboldt SK	52°11′46″N 105°07′23″W	Federal (11807)	Q5940368	More images
Post Office	602 Main Street; Humboldt SK	52°11′56″N 105°07′19″W	Humboldt municipality (2880)	Q5940368	More images
Provincial Court House	805 8th Avenue; Humboldt SK	52°12′08″N 105°07′23″W	Humboldt municipality (2871)		
Water Tower	407 3rd Avenue; Humboldt SK	52°11′44″N 105°07′01″W	Humboldt municipality (2787)		
Cattle Barn Building 14	Indian Head SK	50°31′59″N 103°39′22″W	Federal (18717)		Upload Photo
Mainline Ford Building	427 Grand Avenue; Indian Head SK	50°31′58″N 103°40′08″W	Indian Head municipality (1286)		Upload Photo
Stable Building No. 15	Indian Head Research Station; Indian Head SK	50°31′59″N 103°39′15″W	Federal (18719)		Upload Photo
Red Brick Schoolhouse	306 - 1st Street S.W. Ituna SK	51°10′04″N 103°29′49″W	Ituna municipality (6451)		Upload Photo
Capital Theatre at 566 First Street	566 1st Street; Kamsack SK	51°33′44″N 101°54′22″W	Kamsack municipality (4782)		Upload Photo
Former Power Building	Kamsack SK	51°34′12″N 101°55′16″W	Kamsack municipality (4794)		Upload Photo
Former Water Tower	Queen Elizabeth Blvd; Kamsack SK	51°33′54″N 101°53′24″W	Kamsack municipality (3406)		Upload Photo
Royal Canadian Legion - Kamsack Branch No. 24	324 2nd Street; Kamsack SK	51°33′42″N 101°53′53″W	Kamsack municipality (5814)		Upload Photo
All Saints Anglican Church	Pelletier Park; Katepwa Beach SK	50°40′09″N 103°36′04″W	Katepwa Beach municipality (1644)		Upload Photo
Goddard's Dry Goods	427 2nd Avenue; Kelliher SK	51°15′49″N 103°44′13″W	Kelliher municipality (4973)		Upload Photo
Heritage Place	99 Prouse Street; Kelvington SK	52°09′41″N 103°31′44″W	Kelvington municipality (8405)		Upload Photo
Kerrobert Court House	433 Manitoba Avenue; Kerrobert SK	51°55′06″N 109°08′17″W	Kerrobert municipality (3587)	Q103963668	More images
The Kerrobert Library	102 Bosworth Street; Kerrobert SK	51°55′08″N 109°08′06″W	Kerrobert municipality (4131)		
Kerrobert Water Tower	Kerrobert SK	51°55′04″N 109°08′35″W	Kerrobert municipality (4084)	Q104591419	More images
Old Post Office	218 Main Street; Kinistino SK	52°57′06″N 105°01′47″W	Kinistino municipality (10813)		Upload Photo
Canadian Northern Railway Station	524 Railway Street; Kipling SK	50°06′15″N 102°38′10″W	Kipling municipality (3787)		Upload Photo
Kipling and District Historical Museum	201 4th Street; Kipling SK	50°06′10″N 102°38′02″W	Kipling municipality (4889)		Upload Photo
R.M. of Kingsley No. 124 Office	613 Main Street; Kipling SK	50°06′10″N 102°38′02″W	Kipling municipality (2756)		Upload Photo
St. Radagonde Roman Catholic Church	5 4th Avenue W Lafleche SK	49°42′17″N 106°34′26″W	Lafleche municipality (6458)		Upload Photo
Larson Mausoleum	Lang SK	49°55′01″N 104°21′43″W	Lang municipality (1313)		Upload Photo
Lanigan CPR Station	75 Railway Avenue; Lanigan SK	51°50′43″N 105°02′06″W	Lanigan municipality (8693)		Upload Photo
Bramshott Spirits	7 Main Street; Leask SK	53°01′18″N 106°44′28″W	Leask municipality (13869)		Upload Photo
Sacred Heart Parish, Rectory and The Stations of the Cross	Lebret SK	50°45′18″N 103°42′25″W	Lebret municipality (6393)	Q111365631	More images
Kellross Heritage Museum	2nd Avenue; Leross SK	51°17′14″N 103°51′50″W	Leross municipality (7501)		Upload Photo
Leross Heritage Park	3rd Avenue; Leross SK	51°17′20″N 103°51′54″W	Leross municipality (7499)		Upload Photo
Brinkworth Residence	1108 Erin Avenue; Lipton SK	50°53′59″N 103°51′00″W	Lipton municipality (7060)		Upload Photo
R.M. of Lipton No. 217 Office Building and Site	226 Main Street; Lipton SK	50°54′01″N 103°51′04″W	Lipton municipality (16280)		Upload Photo
The Old Post Office	5001 50th Street; Lloydminster SK	53°17′02″N 110°00′18″W	Lloydminster municipality (3779)	Q104170459	More images
Bielby Residence	Loon Lake SK	54°09′01″N 108°55′19″W	Loon Lake municipality (1964)		Upload Photo
Steele Narrows National Historic Site of Canada	Highway 699; Loon Lake SK	54°02′21″N 109°19′03″W	Federal (18953)	Q19888219	Upload Photo
Lucky Lake Museum	Lucky Lake SK	50°59′06″N 107°08′02″W	Lucky Lake municipality (16250)		Upload Photo
165 Elgin Crescent	165 Elgin Crescent; Lumsden SK	50°38′43″N 104°51′43″W	Lumsden municipality (13866)		Upload Photo
John Nugent Studio	Lumsden SK	50°39′12″N 104°52′12″W	Saskatchewan (5859)		Upload Photo
Lumsden & District Heritage Museum Property	30 Qu'Appelle Drive West; Lumsden SK	50°38′39″N 104°52′01″W	Lumsden municipality (16226)		Upload Photo
Lumsden Plaza	215 James Street North; Lumsden SK	50°38′48″N 104°52′05″W	Lumsden municipality (1527)		Upload Photo
Luseland Theatre	403 Grand Avenue; Luseland SK	52°04′54″N 109°23′38″W	Luseland municipality (4779)	Q105948165	More images
Macrorie School	Macrorie SK	51°19′38″N 107°05′06″W	Macrorie municipality (3778)		Upload Photo
CNR Station	600 2nd Street East; Maidstone SK	53°05′06″N 109°17′26″W	Maidstone municipality (11696)		Upload Photo
Manor Museum in Manor	Newcombe Street; Manor SK	49°36′24″N 102°05′13″W	Manor municipality (3108)		Upload Photo
Cypress Hills Massacre National Historic Site of Canada	Maple Creek SK	49°33′02″N 109°53′20″W	Federal (9307)	Q22666635	More images
Orr Law Office	114 Jasper Street; Maple Creek SK	49°54′32″N 109°28′43″W	Maple Creek municipality (9045)		Upload Photo
St. Mary's Anglican Church	302 Jasper Street; Maple Creek SK	49°54′24″N 109°28′44″W	Maple Creek municipality (6621)		Upload Photo
St. Joseph's Roman Catholic Church	2nd Avenue; Marcelin SK	52°55′39″N 106°47′38″W	Marcelin municipality (10416)		Upload Photo
120 1st Street East	120 1st Street East; Meadow Lake SK	54°07′55″N 108°25′54″W	Meadow Lake municipality (8024)		
Anderson's Home	810 Broadway Avenue South; Melfort SK	52°51′02″N 104°36′47″W	Melfort municipality (11923)		Upload Photo
McKendry House	412 MacLeod Avenue W Melfort SK	52°51′48″N 104°37′05″W	Melfort municipality (10711)		Upload Photo
Court House	409 Main Street; Melfort SK	52°51′46″N 104°36′33″W	Melfort municipality (7508)		Upload Photo
Power House	401 Melfort Street; Melfort SK	52°51′23″N 104°37′18″W	Melfort municipality (11924)		Upload Photo
Sask Tel Building at 103 MacLeod East	103 McLeod Avenue East; Melfort SK	52°51′40″N 104°36′32″W	Melfort municipality (7511)		Upload Photo
Water Tower	111 Broadway North; Melfort SK	52°51′42″N 104°36′58″W	Melfort municipality (3785)		Upload Photo
All Saints' Anglican Church	602 Main Street; Melville SK	50°55′52″N 102°48′14″W	Melville municipality (3184)		Upload Photo
Canadian National Railways Station	Main Street (at First Ave.W.(Highway 15)); Melville SK	50°55′35″N 102°48′26″W	Federal (4561)	Q3097016	More images
Cornerstone Place	101 3rd Avenue W Melville SK	50°55′43″N 102°48′22″W	Melville municipality (1413)		Upload Photo
First Union Church	148 5th Avenue E Melville SK	50°55′48″N 102°48′10″W	Melville municipality (3185)		Upload Photo
Intercession of St. Mary Ukrainian Greek Orthodox Church	398 Prince Edward Street; Melville SK	50°55′41″N 102°47′46″W	Melville municipality (1577)		Upload Photo
Luther Academy	920 9th Avenue W Melville SK	50°56′21″N 102°49′12″W	Melville municipality (1410)		Upload Photo
Melville City Hall	420 Main Street; Melville SK	50°55′47″N 102°48′18″W	Saskatchewan (3096), Melville municipality (3183)		Upload Photo
Melville Railway Museum	Melville Regional Park; Melville SK	50°55′48″N 102°48′11″W	Melville municipality (3949)		Upload Photo
St. Paul's Lutheran Church	238 3rd Avenue E Melville SK	50°39′09″N 102°04′44″W	Melville municipality (3186)		Upload Photo
Ukrainian Greek Catholic Church of St. George	708 3rd Avenue E Melville SK	50°55′34″N 102°47′35″W	Melville municipality (1412)		Upload Photo
Municipal Office at Meota	1st Street Street E Meota SK	53°02′28″N 108°27′07″W	Meota municipality (5756)		Upload Photo
Commissioners Residence	Merryflat SK	49°33′52″N 109°53′20″W	Federal (4322)		Upload Photo
Fort Walsh National Historic Site of Canada	PO Box 278; Merryflat SK	49°33′52″N 109°53′20″W	Federal (6666)	Q3078102	More images
Milden Community Museum	Milden SK	51°29′16″N 107°31′23″W	Milden municipality (7858)		Upload Photo
Saint Aloysius Roman Catholic Church	303 Main Street; Milestone SK	49°59′42″N 104°30′50″W	Milestone municipality (9228)		Upload Photo
Doctor Chestnut's Home	1001 Mark Avenue; Moosomin SK	50°08′31″N 101°40′08″W	Moosomin municipality (1965)		Upload Photo
McCurdy (Truman-Heinz) Building	702 Windover Avenue; Moosomin SK	50°08′42″N 101°40′16″W	Moosomin municipality (4977)		Upload Photo
McNaughton Building	608 Carleton Street; Moosomin SK	50°08′41″N 101°39′50″W	Moosomin municipality (1515)	Q7273564	Upload Photo
Moosomin Communiplex and Bradley Park	Wright Road East; Moosomin SK	50°08′14″N 101°40′19″W	Moosomin municipality (1643)		Upload Photo
The A.A. Hall	708 Birtle Street; Moosomin SK	50°08′42″N 101°40′08″W	Moosomin municipality (1571)		Upload Photo
Old Morse School	410 McKenzie Street; Morse SK	50°25′05″N 107°02′35″W	Morse municipality (6459)		Upload Photo
Fire Hall	11 - 2nd Avenue West; Mortlach SK	50°27′11″N 106°03′59″W	Mortlach municipality (13864)		Upload Photo
Ambroz Blacksmith Shop and Residence	115 Third Street; Mossbank SK	49°56′29″N 105°57′50″W	Saskatchewan (2873)		Upload Photo
Mossbank & District Museum Inc., the Schoolhouse, the Blacksmith Shop, & Ambroz House	115 3rd Street W Mossbank SK	49°56′29″N 105°57′50″W	Mossbank municipality (13865)		Upload Photo
Old Mossbank Fire Hall	112 Third Street West CN; Mossbank SK	49°56′22″N 105°57′50″W	Mossbank municipality (6153)		Upload Photo
Muenster Hotel	401 Railway Street; Muenster SK	52°11′24″N 104°59′49″W	Muenster municipality (9248)		Upload Photo
Pioneer School	200 Third Avenue; Naicam SK	52°25′03″N 104°29′49″W	Naicam municipality (8676)		Upload Photo
Bank of Commerce	201 Main Street; Nokomis SK	51°30′30″N 105°00′32″W	Nokomis municipality (7507)		Upload Photo
Canadian National Railways Station	75 Railway Avenue; North Battleford SK	52°46′19″N 108°17′55″W	Federal (4582)	Q7054085	More images
North Battleford Public Library	1091 100th Street; North Battleford SK	52°46′24″N 108°17′57″W	North Battleford municipality (1991)		
Hickson - Maribelli Lakes Pictographs Protected Area	Northern Saskatchewan Administration District SK	56°15′50″N 104°26′35″W	Saskatchewan (16228)		Upload Photo
B. A. Garage	123 Main Street; Ogema SK	49°34′30″N 104°54′54″W	Ogema municipality (2678)		Upload Photo
Fire Hall	111 Main Street; Ogema SK	49°34′28″N 104°54′54″W	Ogema municipality (1292)		
Canadian Pacific Railway Station	100 Railway Ave; Outlook SK	51°29′22″N 107°03′15″W	Outlook municipality (6398)	Q7112825	More images
Greer Block	233 Main Street; Oxbow SK	49°13′45″N 102°10′26″W	Oxbow municipality (1335)		Upload Photo
Paddockwood Community Hall	First Street North; Paddockwood SK	53°30′35″N 105°33′50″W	Paddockwood municipality (11322)		Upload Photo
Parkside Public School and Grounds	Parkside SK	53°09′51″N 106°32′10″W	Parkside municipality (11698)		Upload Photo
Saskatchewan Wheat Pool Elevator	Railway Right of Way; Parkside SK	53°09′59″N 106°32′12″W	Parkside municipality (10418)		Upload Photo
Fort Livingstone National Historic Site of Canada	Pelly SK	51°54′18″N 101°59′06″W	Federal (11599)	Q5471533	More images
Fort Pelly National Historic Site of Canada	Pelly SK	51°46′36″N 101°59′56″W	Federal (11745)	Q5471812	More images
Fort Pelly-Livingstone Museum	First Avenue South; Pelly SK	51°51′19″N 101°55′41″W	Pelly municipality (5817)		Upload Photo
St. Alban's Anglican Church	302 1st Avenue South; Pelly SK	51°51′21″N 101°55′37″W	Pelly municipality (4834)		Upload Photo
Synod of the Diocese of Qu'Appelle	225 Ontario Street; Pense SK	50°24′58″N 104°59′02″W	Pense municipality (5507)		Upload Photo
Roman Catholic Church in the Village of Plenty	5th Street; Plenty SK	51°46′58″N 108°38′35″W	Plenty municipality (4132)		Upload Photo
Notre Dame d’Auvergne Parish Church	317 2nd Street West; Ponteix SK	49°44′49″N 107°29′35″W	Ponteix municipality (8399)		
Notre Dame d’Auvergne Parish Hall	232 2nd Street West; Ponteix SK	49°44′45″N 107°29′35″W	Ponteix municipality (8398)		Upload Photo
Log Cabin, Rural School & St. David's Church	Windsor Avenue & Elm Street; Porcupine Plain SK	52°35′59″N 103°15′40″W	Porcupine Plain municipality (7425)		Upload Photo
Battle of Cut Knife Hill National Historic Site of Canada	North of Cut Knife; Poundmaker Reserve SK	52°50′20″N 108°57′44″W	Federal (18923)	Q18343138	Upload Photo
St. John the Evangelist Ukrainian Catholic Church	30 1st Avenue; Prud'homme SK	52°20′19″N 105°53′38″W	Prud'homme municipality (9243)		Upload Photo
Sts. Donatien and Rogatien Roman Catholic Church	Prud'homme SK	52°20′23″N 105°53′24″W	Prud'homme municipality (9241)		Upload Photo
Dr. Ernest Luthi Residence	112 1st Avenue; Punnichy SK	51°22′32″N 104°17′49″W	Punnichy municipality (7500)		Upload Photo
Brite Spot	28 Qu'Appelle Street; Qu'Appelle SK	50°33′00″N 103°52′59″W	Qu'Appelle municipality (9260)		
Knox Presbyterian Church	106 Walsh Street; Qu'Appelle SK	50°32′36″N 103°52′47″W	Qu'Appelle municipality (4964)		
Mountjoy Residence	35 Walsh Street; Qu'Appelle SK	50°32′19″N 103°52′44″W	Qu'Appelle municipality (4885)		Upload Photo
Qu'Appelle Royal Bank Building	Qu'Appelle Street; Qu'Appelle SK	50°32′26″N 103°52′41″W	Qu'Appelle municipality (1333)		
Qu'Appelle Town Hall	25 9th Avenue; Qu'Appelle SK	50°32′30″N 103°52′34″W	Qu'Appelle municipality (13542)		
St. Peter's Anglican Church	37 Walsh Street; Qu'Appelle SK	50°32′19″N 103°52′44″W	Qu'Appelle municipality (4895)		
St. Michael's Anglican Church	28 Main Street; Quill Lake SK	52°04′22″N 104°15′22″W	Quill Lake municipality (9257)		Upload Photo
Canadian National Railway Station	Railway Avenue; Rabbit Lake SK	53°08′27″N 107°46′03″W	Rabbit Lake municipality (8020)		Upload Photo
Rose Gill Hospital	1st Street W & 2nd Avenue; Rabbit Lake SK	53°08′37″N 107°46′05″W	Rabbit Lake municipality (8022)		Upload Photo
Canadian Imperial Bank of Commerce	133 Main Street; Radville SK	49°27′40″N 104°17′47″W	Radville municipality (4853)		Upload Photo
Canadian Northern Railway Station	Railway Avenue; Radville SK	49°27′42″N 104°17′43″W	Radville municipality (4129)		
Radville Senior Citizen's Club	614 Healy Avenue; Radville SK	49°27′41″N 104°17′49″W	Radville municipality (5580)		Upload Photo
Ukrainian Greek Orthodox Church of St. Michael's Parish	SK 754; Rama SK	51°45′16″N 102°59′56″W	Rama municipality (19575)		Upload Photo
Raymore Pioneer Museum	700 Block 1st Avenue; Raymore SK	51°20′36″N 104°01′48″W	Raymore municipality (7426)		Upload Photo
Future Museum Site	7, 8, 9 Brewer Bay; Regina Beach SK	50°47′12″N 104°58′05″W	Regina Beach municipality (3784)		Upload Photo
Stable, Building 6	Reno SK	49°33′52″N 109°53′20″W	Federal (4323)		
St. Rapheal's Roman Catholic Church	Richard SK	52°41′41″N 107°42′22″W	Richard municipality (16370)		Upload Photo
Ridgedale United Church	Corner of First St. West and First Ave. Ridgedale SK	53°03′22″N 104°09′18″W	Ridgedale municipality (4902)		Upload Photo
Fort Espérance National Historic Site of Canada	Rocanville SK	50°29′36″N 101°35′56″W	Federal (11713)	Q1438517	More images
Rocanville and District Museum Site	220 Qu'Appelle Avenue; Rocanville SK	50°23′09″N 101°42′18″W	Rocanville municipality (6620)		Upload Photo
Rocanville Farmers Building	620 Railway Avenue; Rocanville SK	50°22′56″N 101°42′00″W	Rocanville municipality (1563)		Upload Photo
Symons Metalworkers Company Limited	602 Railway Avenue; Rocanville SK	50°22′57″N 101°42′07″W	Rocanville municipality (3590)		Upload Photo
C.P. Rail Station House	SK-18, at the end of 1st Street North; Rockglen SK	49°10′44″N 105°57′01″W	Rockglen municipality (9124)		Upload Photo
Lions Community Hall	Rosthern SK	52°39′42″N 106°19′55″W	Rosthern municipality (5020)		Upload Photo
National Hotel	802 Railway Avenue; Rosthern SK	52°39′41″N 106°19′57″W	Rosthern municipality (5021)		Upload Photo
Rosthern Canadian National Railway Station	701 Railway Avenue; Rosthern SK	52°39′44″N 106°19′55″W	Rosthern municipality (5676)		Upload Photo
Rosthern Mennonite Heritage Museum	7010 5th Street; Rosthern SK	52°39′57″N 106°20′38″W	Rosthern municipality (1576)		
Rosthern Post Office	1018 7th Street; Rosthern SK	52°39′44″N 106°20′05″W	Rosthern municipality (11533)		Upload Photo
Saint Paul's Evangelical Church	808 1st Avenue; Rosthern SK	52°39′43″N 106°20′06″W	Rosthern municipality (5019)		Upload Photo
Seager Wheeler's Maple Grove Farm National Historic Site of Canada	Rosthern SK	52°40′24″N 106°13′05″W	Federal (12136)	Q7440433	More images
St. Augustine's Anglican Church	2004 9th Street; Rosthern SK	52°39′39″N 106°20′10″W	Rosthern municipality (5018)		Upload Photo
Town Office and Library	702 Railway Avenue; Rosthern SK	52°39′44″N 106°19′55″W	Rosthern municipality (5017)		Upload Photo
Grain Elevator 22	Scott SK	52°21′44″N 108°50′38″W	Federal (9823)		Upload Photo
1923 portion of Sedley School	519 Prairie Avenue; Sedley SK	50°05′57″N 104°00′25″W	Sedley municipality (11920)		Upload Photo
Grand Hotel	37 & 41 Third Avenue E Shaunavon SK	49°38′55″N 108°24′29″W	Shaunavon municipality (1387)		Upload Photo
Shaunavon Courthouse at 401 Third Street West	401 3rd Street West; Shaunavon SK	49°38′48″N 108°24′47″W	Shaunavon municipality (7505)		
Shaunavon Hotel	189 Centre Street; Shaunavon SK	49°38′41″N 108°24′25″W	Shaunavon municipality (1589)		Upload Photo
Canadian National Railway Station	Carl Erickson Avenue; Shell Lake SK	53°18′18″N 107°03′55″W	Shell Lake municipality (8021)		Upload Photo
Hazel Ridge School	Shellbrook SK	53°09′42″N 106°21′43″W	Shellbrook municipality (6891)		Upload Photo
Shellbrook C.N. Railway Station	CNR Right of Way, Main Street South; Shellbrook SK	53°23′41″N 105°32′35″W	Shellbrook municipality (11535)		Upload Photo
Rural Municipality Office	Simpson SK	51°26′56″N 105°26′38″W	Simpson municipality (4867)		Upload Photo
Southey's First Original Classroom School	Southey SK	50°56′24″N 104°29′31″W	Southey municipality (1988)		Upload Photo
Reynold Rapp Residence	First Street South; Spalding SK	52°19′47″N 104°29′46″W	Spalding municipality (8675)	Q7319607	Upload Photo
Spalding United Church	404 4th Avenue; Spalding SK	52°19′50″N 104°30′04″W	Spalding municipality (8404)		Upload Photo
St. Brieux Museum	300 Barbier Drive; St. Brieux SK	52°38′18″N 104°53′24″W	St. Brieux municipality (10149)		Upload Photo
Assumption of the Blessed Virgin Mary Church	Main Street and Second Avenue; St. Walburg SK	53°37′51″N 109°12′07″W	St. Walburg municipality (9218)		Upload Photo
C.N. Station at Railway Avenue	Railway Avenue at 1st Street East; St. Walburg SK	53°38′11″N 109°12′08″W	St. Walburg municipality (9256)		Upload Photo
Holy Trinity Church National Historic Site of Canada	Stanley Mission SK	55°25′04″N 104°33′00″W	Federal (12545), Saskatchewan (2917)	Q5886366	More images
Golden Age Club Buildings	126 4th Street; Star City SK	52°51′51″N 104°19′55″W	Star City municipality (4891)		Upload Photo
Town Office	100 4th Street; Star City SK	52°51′53″N 104°19′58″W	Star City municipality (1660)		Upload Photo
Stenen United Church	1st Avenue; Stenen SK	51°53′56″N 102°22′37″W	Stenen municipality (4791)		Upload Photo
315 Main Street	315 Main Street; Stoughton SK	49°40′48″N 103°01′34″W	Stoughton municipality (1310)		Upload Photo
Old Municipal Office	Strasbourg SK	51°00′22″N 104°56′28″W	Strasbourg municipality (6150)		Upload Photo
Old School (Teacherage)	501 Railway Avenue; Strasbourg SK	51°04′14″N 104°57′04″W	Strasbourg municipality (16279)		Upload Photo
Strasbourg and District Museum	501 Railway Avenue; Strasbourg SK	51°04′24″N 104°57′10″W	Strasbourg municipality (6151)		Upload Photo
Strongfield Cenotaph	Corner of Broadway Street and Saskatchewan Avenue; Strongfield SK	51°19′55″N 106°35′49″W	Strongfield municipality (16258)		
Sturgis Station House Museum	Corner of Broadway Street and Saskatchewan Avenue; Sturgis SK	51°56′04″N 102°32′13″W	Sturgis municipality (4078)		Upload Photo
Battleford Trail Wheel Rut Area	Swift Current SK	50°17′45″N 107°48′25″W	Swift Current municipality (4979)		Upload Photo
C.P.R Dam	Swift Current SK	50°16′44″N 107°47′17″W	Swift Current municipality (5558)		Upload Photo
Canadian Pacific Railway Station	Railway Station Street East; Swift Current SK	50°16′55″N 107°47′59″W	Swift Current municipality (4525)	Q7656043	More images
Central School	121 Dufferin Street W Swift Current SK	50°17′28″N 107°48′07″W	Swift Current municipality (1551)		Upload Photo
Court House	121 Lorne Street W Swift Current SK	50°17′23″N 107°48′07″W	Swift Current municipality (5801)		Upload Photo
First United Church	233 3rd Avenue NE; Swift Current SK	50°17′08″N 107°47′46″W	Swift Current municipality (1659)		Upload Photo
Former Lyric Theatre	227 Central Avenue North; Swift Current SK	49°44′45″N 107°29′35″W	Swift Current municipality (8367)		
Gray Burial Site National Historic Site of Canada	On a farm northwest of Swift Current; Swift Current SK	50°20′32″N 107°52′45″W	Federal (19641)		
Main Building No. 75	1 Airport Road; Swift Current SK	50°16′51″N 107°45′42″W	Federal (19680)		
Powley House	233 Lorne Street E Swift Current SK	50°17′31″N 107°47′49″W	Swift Current municipality (1550)		Upload Photo
Swift Current Mennonite Heritage Village	Agricultural and Exhibition Association Grounds; Swift Current SK	50°16′44″N 107°46′37″W	Swift Current municipality (5576)		Upload Photo
Canadian Pacific Railway Station	6 Christopher Street N Theodore SK	51°25′30″N 102°55′21″W	Theodore municipality (2663)	Q3944763	More images
Elim Evangelical Lutheran Church	121 Henry Street; Theodore SK	51°25′30″N 102°55′08″W	Theodore municipality (4777)		Upload Photo
Tugaske School	Tugaske SK	50°52′16″N 106°17′28″W	Tugaske municipality (11915)		Upload Photo
Old CIBC Building	219 Main Street; Turtleford SK	53°23′20″N 108°57′50″W	Turtleford municipality (1531)		Upload Photo
Unity Heritage Museum	900 First Street East; Unity SK	52°26′58″N 109°08′49″W	Unity municipality (7848)		Upload Photo
The old Val Marie Elevator	Val Marie SK	49°14′37″N 107°43′41″W	Val Marie municipality (4150)		More images
The Red Brick School	100 Centre Street; Val Marie SK	49°14′43″N 107°43′55″W	Val Marie municipality (4149)		Upload Photo
Doukhobors at Veregin National Historic Site of Canada	Veregin SK	51°35′00″N 102°04′59″W	Federal (12783)	Q5302215	More images
Veregin Doukhobor Prayer Home	Veregin SK	51°34′56″N 102°05′02″W	Saskatchewan (3102)		More images
Vibank Convent	101 2nd Avenue; Vibank SK	50°20′05″N 103°56′49″W	Vibank municipality (1780)		Upload Photo
Old Bank of Commerce	Main Street & Buffer Avenue; Vonda SK	52°19′20″N 106°05′43″W	Vonda municipality (9246)		Upload Photo
Vonda Rink	403 Buffer Avenue; Vonda SK	52°19′21″N 106°05′35″W	Vonda municipality (9237)	Q7941570	More images
Wadena Glass & Mye Signs	93 Main Street N Wadena SK	51°56′44″N 103°48′07″W	Wadena municipality (10749)		Upload Photo
Wadena Town Office	102 Main Street; Wadena SK	51°56′45″N 103°48′04″W	Wadena municipality (10754)		Upload Photo
Wakaw Elementary School	316 Main Street; Wakaw SK	52°38′58″N 105°44′38″W	Wakaw municipality (10150)		Upload Photo
Former Canadian Northern Railway Station	4002 Central Avenue; Waldheim SK	52°37′15″N 106°39′21″W	Waldheim municipality (10791)		
Cenotaph Site	Main Street; Waldron SK	50°51′07″N 102°30′50″W	Waldron municipality (7850)		Upload Photo
Christ Anglican Church	319 4th Avenue N Wapella SK	50°15′48″N 101°58′09″W	Wapella municipality (2131)		Upload Photo
Commercial Hotel	329 South Railway Street; Wapella SK	50°15′40″N 101°58′13″W	Wapella municipality (16251)		Upload Photo
Old Town Hall	529 South Railway Street; Wapella SK	50°15′43″N 101°58′25″W	Wapella municipality (16256)		Upload Photo
Warman Senior Drop-In Centre	422 Peters Street; Warman SK	52°19′11″N 106°34′59″W	Warman municipality (10748)		Upload Photo
Christ Anglican Church	119 First Street E. Waseca SK	53°05′59″N 109°28′14″W	Waseca municipality (16214)		Upload Photo
Anahareo's Cabin, Building 35	Ajawaan Lake; Prince Albert National Park SK	53°54′51″N 106°04′26″W	Federal (4497)		Upload Photo
Assembly Hall	Lakeview Drive (I-7, B-1); Waskesiu Lake SK	53°55′13″N 106°05′28″W	Federal (4472)		
Community Hall	Waskesiu Lake SK	55°05′04″N 105°21′07″W	Federal (4269)		Upload Photo
Golf Clubhouse Building 15	Prospect Point; Waskesiu Lake SK	53°54′51″N 106°04′26″W	Federal (4474)		
Grey Owl's Cabin	Ajawaan Lake; Prince Albert National Park SK	53°54′51″N 106°04′26″W	Federal (4496)		
Nature Centre	Lakeview Drive; Waskesiu Lake SK	53°54′51″N 106°04′26″W	Federal (4473)		
Superintendent's Garage, Building 22	Prospect Drive; Waskesiu Lake SK	53°54′51″N 106°04′26″W	Federal (4291)		Upload Photo
Superintendent's Residence, Building 22	Prospect Drive; Waskesiu Lake SK	53°54′51″N 106°04′26″W	Federal (4287)		Upload Photo
W. L. Mackenzie King Cottage, Building 23	Prospect Drive; Waskesiu Lake SK	53°54′51″N 106°04′26″W	Federal (4293)		Upload Photo
Warden's Headquarters / Visitor Information, Building 1	Waskesiu Drive; Waskesiu Lake SK	53°54′51″N 106°04′26″W	Federal (4495)		Upload Photo
South Gate Registration, Building 3	Highway 263 and 240; Waskesiu Lake SK	53°54′51″N 106°04′26″W	Federal (4285)		Upload Photo
All Saints Anglican Church	310 Main Street; Watrous SK	51°40′27″N 105°28′01″W	Watrous municipality (16223)		Upload Photo
Canadian Bank of Commerce National Historic Site of Canada	201 Main Street; Watson SK	52°07′46″N 104°31′25″W	Federal (7564), Watson municipality (7506)	Q5029759	More images
Royal Bank of Canada Building	104 Main Street; Wawota SK	49°54′18″N 102°01′30″W	Wawota municipality (3396)		Upload Photo
Wawota's Original Firehall	Main Street; Wawota SK	49°54′17″N 102°01′30″W	Wawota municipality (3397)		Upload Photo
Weekes Public School at Weekes	Weekes SK	52°34′12″N 102°52′19″W	Weekes municipality (6616)		Upload Photo
Harper's Store	Welwyn SK	50°19′33″N 101°30′58″W	Welwyn municipality (1562)		Upload Photo
Memorial Hall	304 Main Street; Welwyn SK	50°19′28″N 101°31′03″W	Welwyn municipality (16254)		Upload Photo
Trinity United Church	McDonald Street and Welwyn Avenue; Welwyn SK	50°19′30″N 101°31′08″W	Welwyn municipality (4776)		Upload Photo
Knox Presbyterian Church	136 2nd Street; Weyburn SK	49°39′48″N 103°51′17″W	Weyburn municipality (9201)		Upload Photo
Moffet Residence	614 4th Street SE; Weyburn SK	49°39′20″N 103°51′04″W	Weyburn municipality (2702)		Upload Photo
Old City Hall	106 3rd Street; Weyburn SK	49°39′48″N 103°51′12″W	Weyburn municipality (19247)		Upload Photo
Powell Residence	815 4th Street SE; Weyburn SK	49°39′04″N 103°51′07″W	Weyburn municipality (1591)		Upload Photo
Signal Hill Arts Centre	424 10th Avenue S Weyburn SK	49°38′58″N 103°51′04″W	Weyburn municipality (16257)		Upload Photo
Soo Line Historical Museum	1. 39 Highway SE Weyburn SK	49°39′31″N 103°51′04″W	Weyburn municipality (1592)		Upload Photo
T.C. Douglas Calvary Centre	10th Avenue S Weyburn SK	49°39′01″N 103°51′40″W	Weyburn municipality (2370)		Upload Photo
Weyburn Court House	301 Prairie Avenue NE; Weyburn SK	49°39′59″N 103°51′07″W	Saskatchewan (3101)		Upload Photo
Weyburn Security Bank	76 - 3rd Street; Weyburn SK	49°39′42″N 103°51′14″W	Saskatchewan (4070)		Upload Photo
Knox Presbyterian Church	611 Railway Street North; Whitewood SK	50°19′57″N 102°16′01″W	Whitewood municipality (2666)		Upload Photo
Masonic Hall	503 Third Avenue; Whitewood SK	50°19′50″N 102°16′07″W	Whitewood municipality (2128)	Q6783688	Upload Photo
Old Bank of Montreal	707 Lalonde Street; Whitewood SK	50°19′48″N 102°16′01″W	Whitewood municipality (9306)		Upload Photo
R.M. of Willowdale No. 153 Municipal Office	711 Lalonde Street; Whitewood SK	50°19′47″N 102°16′01″W	Whitewood municipality (2500)	Q7273381	More images
Rex Theatre	714 Lalonde Street; Whitewood SK	50°19′47″N 102°16′01″W	Whitewood municipality (9230)	Q17019514	More images
Ramsey Building	208 1st Street E Wilkie SK	52°24′39″N 108°33′04″W	Wilkie municipality (11691)		Upload Photo
Wilkie and District Museum	212 1st Street E Wilkie SK	52°24′35″N 108°42′05″W	Wilkie municipality (19576)		Upload Photo
Catholic Rectory	5 Ave C Willow Bunch SK	49°23′25″N 105°38′10″W	Willow Bunch municipality (3781)		Upload Photo
The Convent	Willow Bunch SK	49°23′23″N 105°38′06″W	Willow Bunch municipality (3782)		
Windthorst School (1926 portion)	326 Moltke Avenue; Windthorst SK	50°06′38″N 102°50′02″W	Windthorst municipality (1802)		Upload Photo
Banbury Residence	104 Front Street; Wolseley SK	50°25′33″N 103°16′48″W	Wolseley municipality (1570)		Upload Photo
Magee House	104 Richmond Street; Wolseley SK	50°25′26″N 103°16′16″W	Wolseley municipality (1569)		Upload Photo
Town Hall/Opera House	510 Varennes Street; Wolseley SK	50°25′27″N 103°16′16″W	Saskatchewan (2789)		
Wolseley Court House	SE corner of Ouimet and Richmond Street; Wolseley SK	50°25′35″N 103°16′12″W	Saskatchewan (2778)		
Wolseley Town Hall/Opera House	510 Varennes Street; Wolseley SK	50°25′27″N 103°16′16″W	Saskatchewan (2378)	Q8030422	More images
Wood Mountain School	200 3rd Avenue; Wood Mountain SK	49°22′12″N 106°23′06″W	Wood Mountain municipality (8401)		Upload Photo
Canadian Pacific Railway Station	A Avenue at Bosworth St. Wynyard SK	51°46′19″N 104°11′10″W	Federal (4526)	Q8040275	More images
Wynyard Court House	410 Avenue C E Wynyard SK	51°46′12″N 104°10′44″W	Wynyard municipality (6394)		Upload Photo
Wynyard Federated Church	330 Bosworth Street; Wynyard SK	51°46′06″N 104°11′06″W	Wynyard municipality (8943)		Upload Photo
Stone School	215 Souris Street; Yellow Grass SK	49°48′20″N 104°09′40″W	Yellow Grass municipality (4975)		Upload Photo
29 Myrtle Avenue	29 Myrtle Avenue; Yorkton SK	51°13′00″N 102°28′01″W	Yorkton municipality (6077)	Q112608081	More images
81 Second Avenue North	81 2nd Avenue North; Yorkton SK	51°12′59″N 102°27′40″W	Yorkton municipality (6081)	Q117054229	More images
Army Navy and Air Force Veterans Building	43-45 Broadway Street East; Yorkton SK	51°12′38″N 102°27′36″W	Yorkton municipality (16283)		
Dulmage Homestead	Yorkton SK	51°12′44″N 102°29′49″W	Yorkton municipality (6390)		Upload Photo
Hudson's Bay Company Store	19 Broadway Street East; Yorkton SK	51°12′38″N 102°27′43″W	Yorkton municipality (2704)	Q131566836	More images
Old Land Titles Building	49 Smith Street East; Yorkton SK	51°12′44″N 102°27′33″W	Yorkton municipality (6155)		Upload Photo
St. Paul's Lutheran Church	73 Smith Street E Yorkton SK	51°12′47″N 102°27′32″W	Yorkton municipality (6452)		Upload Photo
Yorkton Armoury	56 1st Avenue; Yorkton SK	51°12′45″N 102°27′50″W	Federal (9585)		More images
Yorkton Court House	29 Darlington Street East; Yorkton SK	51°12′47″N 102°27′32″W	Saskatchewan (2872)	Q102468617	More images
Yorkton Organic Milling Ltd.	120 Livingstone Street; Yorkton SK	51°12′25″N 102°27′25″W	Yorkton municipality (6078)	Q117054204	More images
Zelma United Church	2nd Avenue E Zelma SK	51°50′32″N 105°54′25″W	Zelma municipality (4869)		Upload Photo
Paroisse Notre Dame de la Nativitie	Park Road; Zenon Park SK	53°04′01″N 103°45′29″W	Zenon Park municipality (4871)		Upload Photo

== See also ==
- List of National Historic Sites of Canada in Saskatchewan
- Heritage Property Act (Saskatchewan)
- List of historic places in rural municipalities of Saskatchewan
