= Waskesiu River =

River in Saskatchewan, Canada

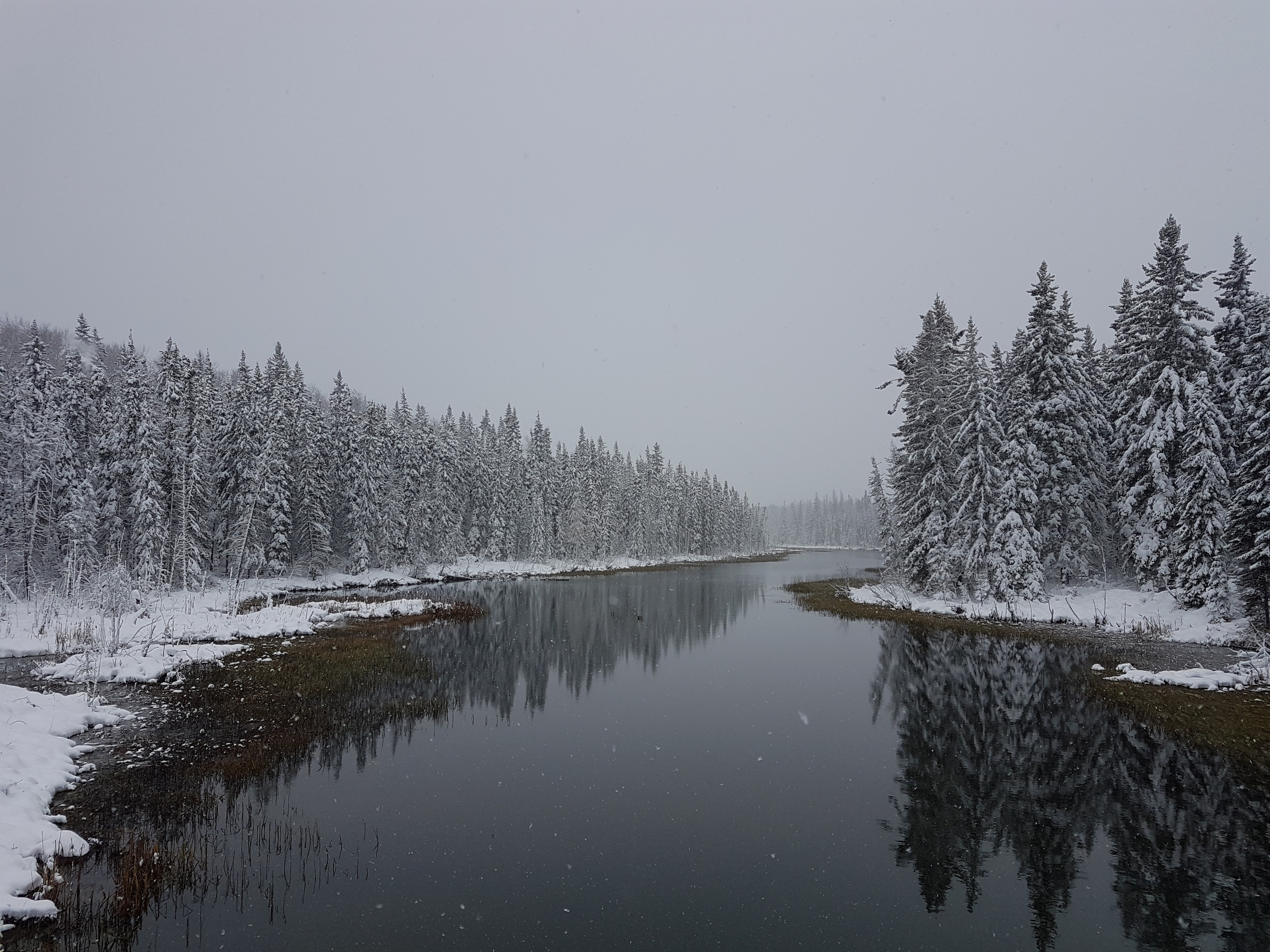
- Waskesiu River

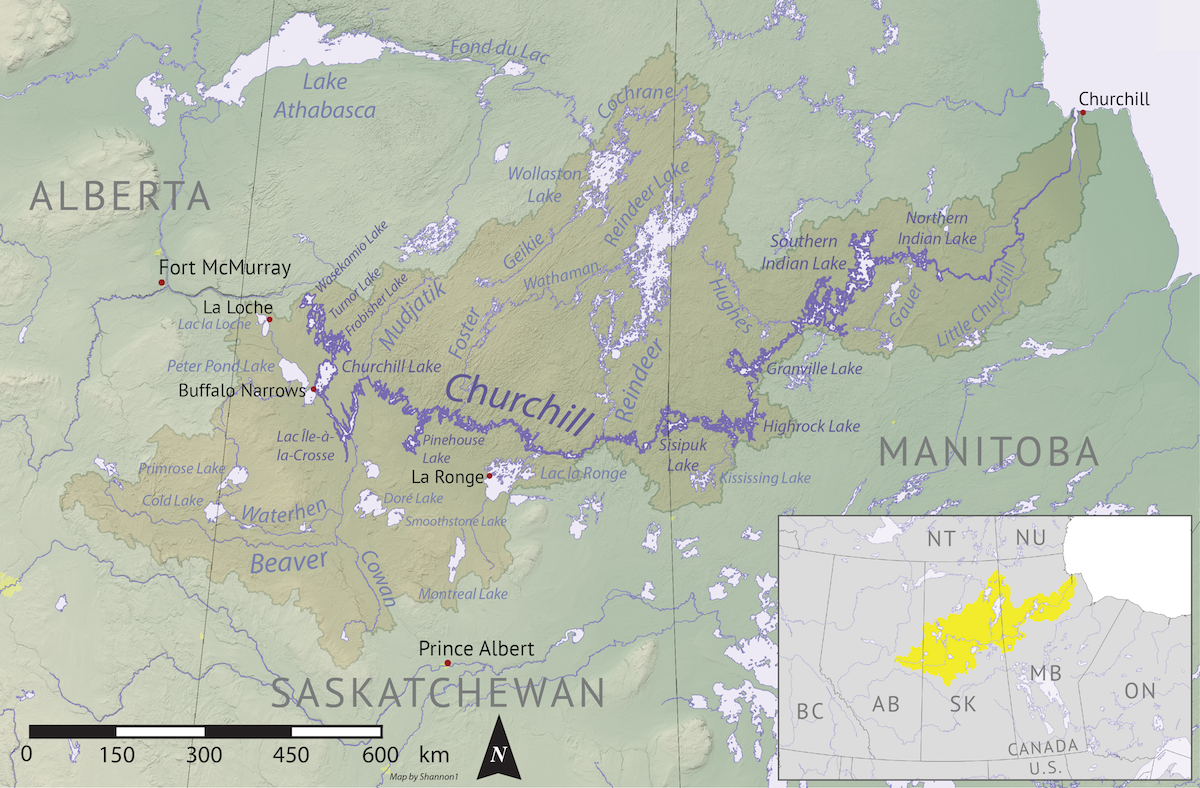
- Churchill River drainage basin

- Location of the mouth in Saskatchewan Waskesiu River (Canada)

Location
- Country: Canada
- Province: Saskatchewan

Physical characteristics
- Source: Waskesiu Lake
  - location: Prince Albert National Park
  - coordinates: 53.9533°N 106.0799°W
  - elevation: 532 m (1,745 ft)
- Mouth: Montreal Lake
  - location: Montreal Lake 106 Indian reserve
  - coordinates: 54.0796°N 105.8097°W
  - elevation: 490 m (1,610 ft)

Basin features
- River system: Churchill River

Waskesiu River is a river that runs through boreal forest in the north-central region of the Canadian province of Saskatchewan. It begins at Waskesiu Lake in Prince Albert National Park and flows north-east to Montreal Lake.

== Description ==
The source of Waskesiu River is at the north-eastern corner of Waskesiu Lake, just north of the village of Waskesiu Lake, in Prince Albert National Park. While the river itself is relatively short, it has a significant catchment area that includes the northern slopes of the Waskesiu Hills, Waskesiu Lake, and Kingsmere Lake. From Waskesiu Lake, Waskesiu River heads north-east out of the park and into the Northern Saskatchewan Administration District where it crosses Highway 2 en route to Montreal Lake in the Montreal Lake 106 Indian reserve.

In Prince Albert National Park, near the source of the river, is the Waskesiu River Trail. It is a 2.5-kilometre (1.6 mi) loop hiking trail that traverses the river bank and valley through forests of black spruce and aspen.

== Waskesiu River Recreation Site ==
Waskesiu River Recreation Site (54.0804°N 105.9401°W) is a provincial recreation site and small campground on the northern banks of Waskesiu River. It is east of the Prince Albert National Park boundary and adjacent to the east side of Highway 2.

== Fish species ==
Fish commonly found in the river include the northern pike.

== See also ==
- List of rivers of Saskatchewan
- Hudson Bay drainage basin
- Tourism in Saskatchewan
