= Waskesiu Upland =

Hilly plateau in Saskatchewan, Canada

- Location within Saskatchewan Location within Canada

Highest point
- Elevation: 750 m (2,460 ft)
- Prominence: 200 m (660 ft)
- Coordinates: 53°50′23″N 106°25′42″W

Geography
- Location: Saskatchewan, Canada
- Parent range: Waskesiu Upland

Waskesiu Upland is a hilly plateau in the central region of the Canadian province of Saskatchewan. Waskesiu means red deer or elk in the Cree language. The plateau is just south-west of the geographical centre of the province and consists of two main ranges — the Waskesiu Hills to the south and the Thunder Hills to the north. The Thunder Hills cover an area of about 225,000 acres. Several notable rivers begin from the upland with ones headed south flowing into the North Saskatchewan River and ones headed north flowing into the Churchill River. Much of the plateau is carpeted in boreal forests and most of the Waskesiu Hills range is within Prince Albert National Park. Besides the national park, there are several provincial recreation sites in and around the upland. The northern part of the upland is part of the Northern Saskatchewan Administration District and is sparsely populated.

== Geography ==
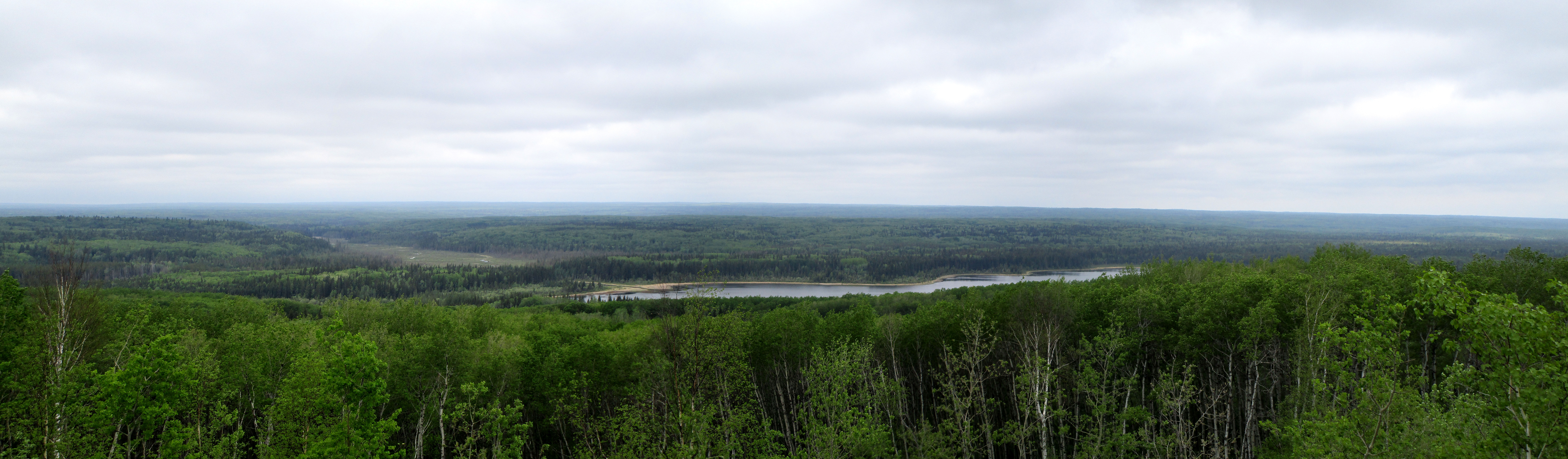
Shady Lake from Height of Land Lookout Tower

The Waskesiu Upland, like most major uplands in Saskatchewan, is composed of unstratified clay and stone till deposited by glaciers during the last ice age over 10,000 years ago. Nimrod Hill in the Nimrod Hills of the Waskesiu Hills is the highest point in the upland at 747 metres (2,451 ft) and represents the divide between the North Saskatchewan River and Churchill River drainage basins. Rivers such as the south flowing Spruce and Sturgeon Rivers and the north flowing Beartrap and Parish Creeks have their headwaters there.

The landscape of Waskesiu Upland consists of rolling hills, knolls, moraines, kettles, muskeg, bogs, and glacier formed valleys. The northern slopes are generally steeper and rougher than the southern ones. The lakes around the hills, especially the southern ones, have deposits of glacial Sediments. Many of the streams that flow out of the plateau are considered misfit streams as the valleys they follow are large and wide as they were formed by glacial meltwaters.

== Rivers and lakes ==
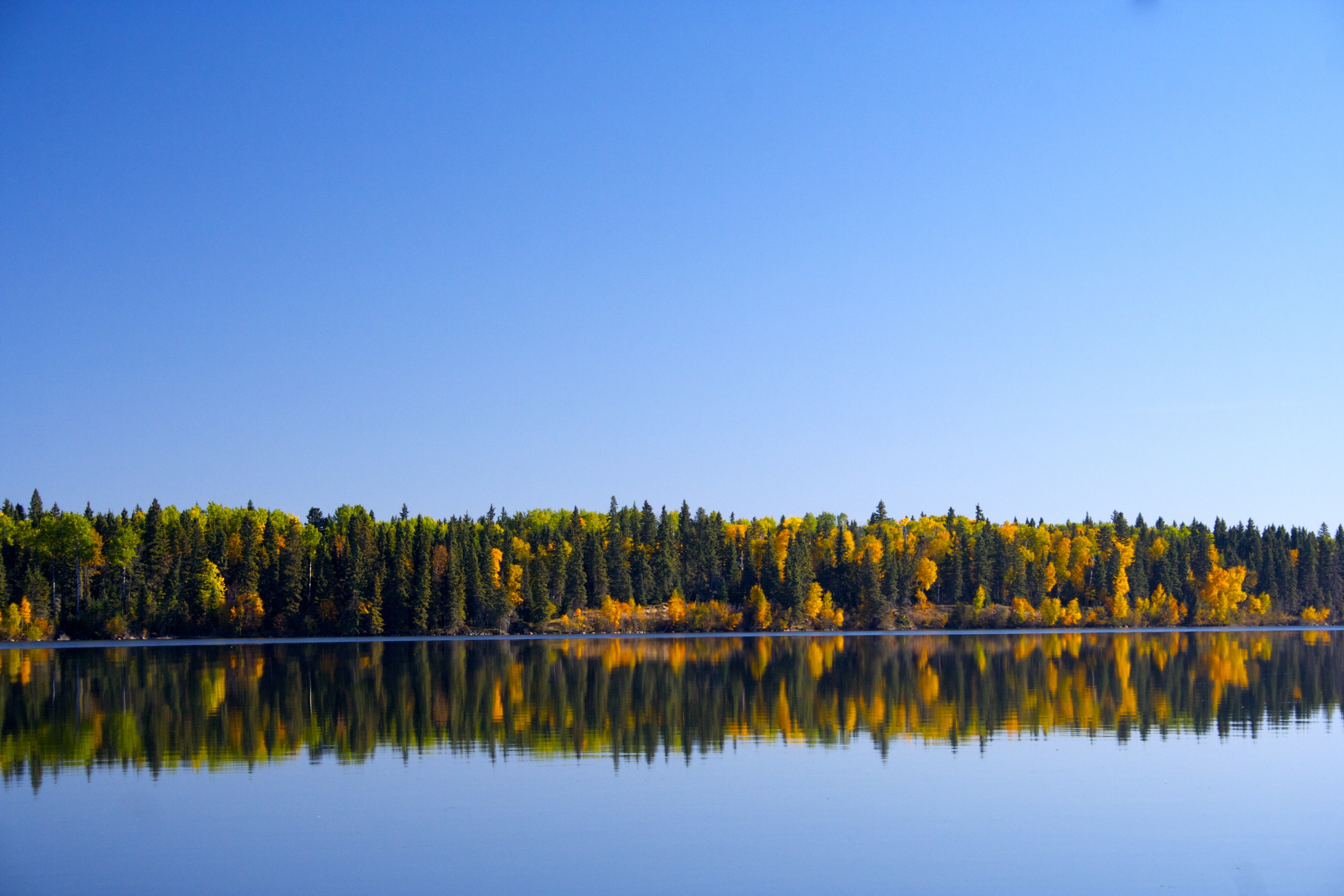
Waskesiu Lake

The south end of Waskesiu Upland is in the North Saskatchewan River watershed. The Sturgeon River begins at the Nimrod hills in the Waskesiu Hills and flows down the western side of the upland through a glacier formed valley. The Spruce River, with its source only a short distance from Sturgeon River's source, flows south down the eastern side of the upland. Spruce River Dam was built along the river's course in 1960 creating Anglin Lake in Great Blue Heron Provincial Park.

Rivers and creeks flowing from the northern and north-western slopes work their way into Smoothstone River, which heads north to the Churchill River. Mahigan Creek, Philion River, Buhl Creek, Randall River, and Twoforks River, are all tributaries of Smoothstone River that flow from the Waskesiu Upland. On the western side, between the Smoothstone and Sturgeon Rivers' watersheds, several creeks and rivers flow westward into Nesslin and Delaronde Lakes. Delaronde Lake lies adjacent to the western slopes of the hills and is part of the Cowan River watershed. The Cowan River flows northward and meets Beaver River en route to the Churchill River.

There are several large lakes in the lowland between the Waskesiu and Thunder Hills, including Waskesiu, Kingsmere, and Crean. The Waskesiu, Crean, and MacLennan Rivers drain much of this lowland east into Montreal Lake. Montreal River, which is in the Churchill River drainage basin, flows out of Montreal Lake and northward. Near the north-eastern corner of the plateau, is Weyakwin Lake, which is a large lake that rivers and creeks flow into from the surrounding Thunder Hills.

== Parks and recreation ==
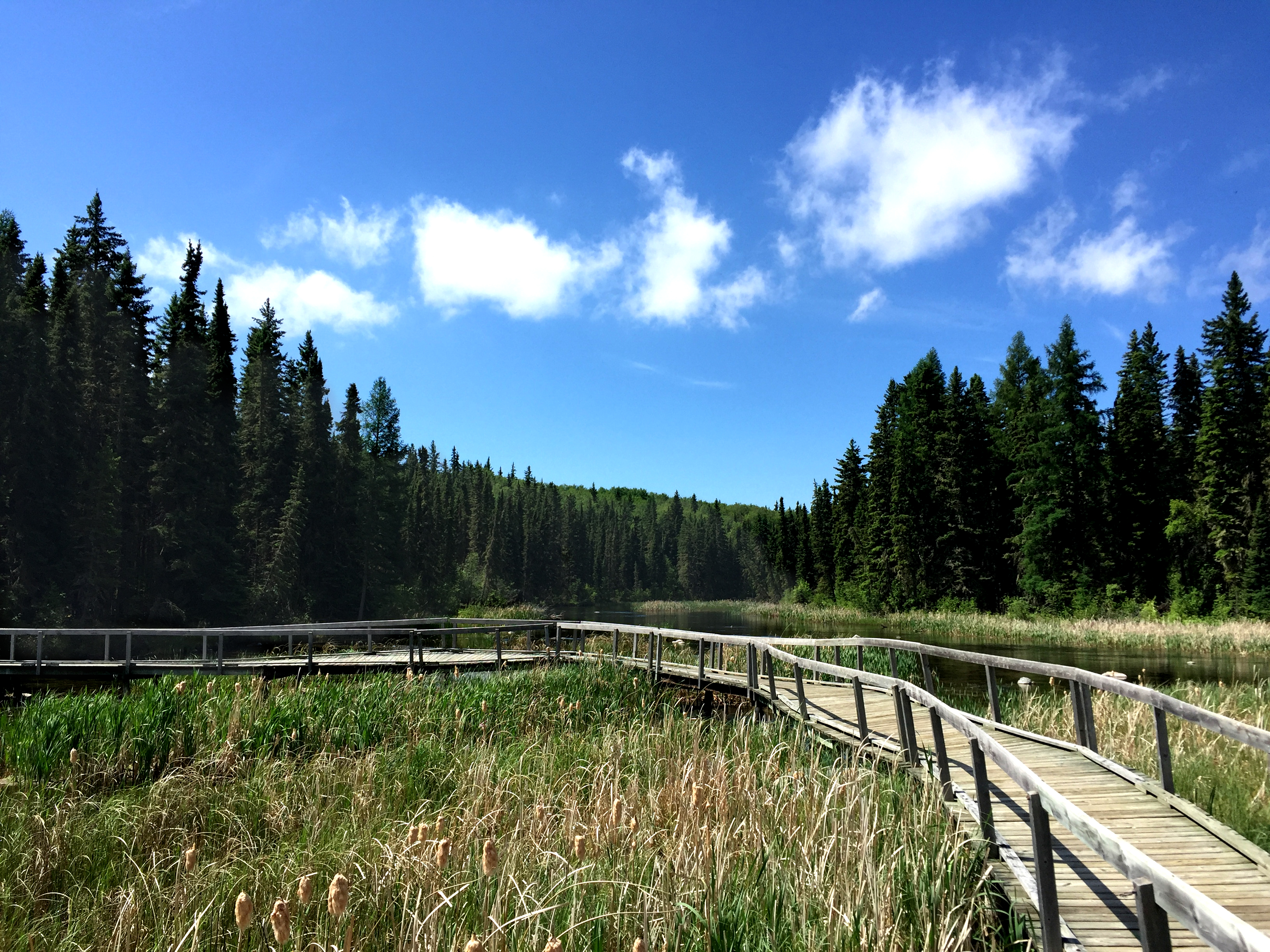
Boardwalk on Waskesiu River Trail

Prince Albert National Park encompasses most of Waskesiu Hills, the southern part of Thunder Hills, and the lowlands between them. The park has several campgrounds, multiple hiking trails of varying difficulty, and access to several lakes for recreation. On the southern shore of Waskesiu Lake is the village of Waskesiu Lake. The village is the recreational centre of the park and uplands as there is a golf course, lodging, restaurants, shopping, and Prince Albert National Park Nature Centre. Adjacent to Kingsmere Lake is Ajawaan Lake which is where Grey Owl's cabin is located.

Outside of the national park are several small provincial campgrounds and conservation areas including at Waskesiu River, MacLennan River, Weyakwin Lake (Ramsey Bay), Nesslin Lake, Delaronde Lake (Zig Zag Bay), Elaine Lake, and Smoothstone Lake. The western part of Great Blue Heron Provincial Park covers part of the eastern slopes of Waskesiu Hills.

== Flora and fauna ==
The Waskesiu Upland is heavily forested and since most of the plateau is in parkland, much of the forest is protected. The southern parts of the upland is forested with trembling aspen and white spruce while the northern parts are forested with jack pine and black spruce. Tamarack and black spruce are found in the peatlands.

Animals commonly found on the upland include bears, bison, elk, deer, foxes, wolves, and otters. There are over 200 species of birds in the hills, including the site of the second largest breeding colony of white pelicans in Canada at Lavallée Lake.

== See also ==
- List of protected areas of Saskatchewan
- List of mountains of Saskatchewan
- Geography of Saskatchewan
