= Elaine Lake =

Lake in Saskatchewan, Canada

- Location in Saskatchewan Elaine Lake (Canada)
- Location: Northern Administration District, Saskatchewan
- Coordinates: 54.4501°N 106.3672°W
- Part of: Churchill River drainage basin
- River sources: Thunder Hills
- Basin countries: Canada
- Surface area: 570.9 ha (1,411 acres)
- Max. depth: 15.23 m (50.0 ft)
- Shore length^{1}: 11.24 km (6.98 mi)
- Surface elevation: 593 m (1,946 ft)
- Settlements: None
- ^{1} Shore length is not a well-defined measure.

Elaine Lake is a lake in the Canadian province of Saskatchewan. It is north of Prince Albert National Park in the Thunder Hills of the Northern Saskatchewan Administration District.

Elaine Lake is in the Churchill River drainage basin. The lake's outflow is at the southern end where it heads west a short distance and flows into the east end of Pease Lake. Pease Lake connects to Buhl Lake, the source of Buhl Creek. Buhl Creek is a tributary of the Smoothstone River, which is a tributary of the Churchill River.

Along the northern shore is Elaine Lake Outfitting.

== Elaine Lake Recreation Site ==
Elaine Lake Recreation Site (54.4302°N 106.3536°W) is a small wilderness campground on the southern shore with no services and a game preserve called Elaine Lake Road Corridor Game Preserve adjacent to it. Access is from Highway 916.

== See also ==
- List of lakes of Saskatchewan
- Tourism in Saskatchewan
