= MacLennan River =

River in Saskatchewan, Canada

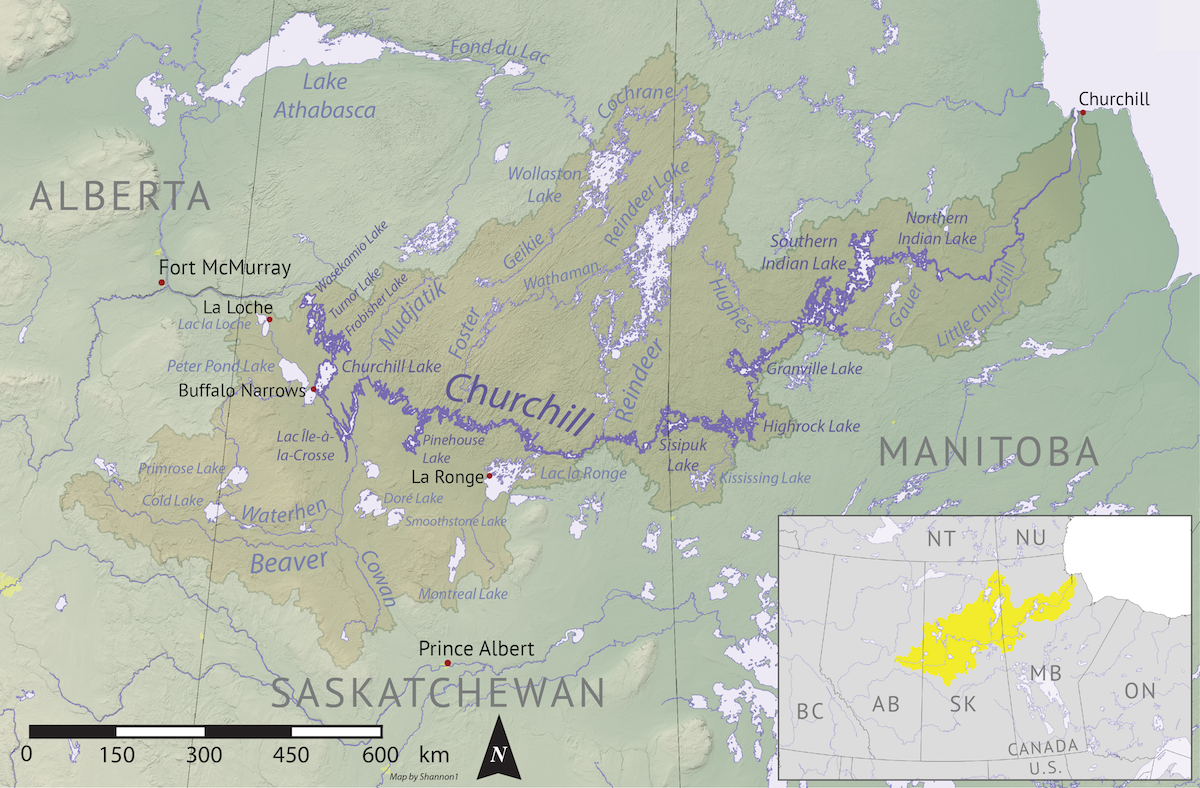
- Churchill River drainage basin

- Location of river's mouth in Saskatchewan MacLennan River (Canada)

Location
- Country: Canada
- Province: Saskatchewan

Physical characteristics
- Source: MacLennan Lake
  - location: Northern Saskatchewan Administration District
  - coordinates: 54.4425°N 106.3122°W
- Mouth: Montreal Lake
  - location: Northern Saskatchewan Administration District
  - coordinates: 54.2103°N 105.8534°W
  - elevation: 490 m (1,610 ft)

Basin features
- Progression: Montreal Lake; Montreal River; Lac la Ronge; Rapid River; Churchill River; Hudson Bay
- River system: Churchill River
- Tributaries
  - right: Crean River
- Waterbodies: Tourist Lake; Wassegam Lake; Tibiska Lake; O'Connor Lake

MacLennan River is a river in the Canadian province of Saskatchewan. It begins at MacLennan Lake in the Thunder Hills of the Northern Saskatchewan Administration District. It then flows generally south-east out of the hills, through a section of Prince Albert National Park, and on to Montreal Lake. MacLennan River is within the Churchill River drainage basin and is in the Mid-Boreal Upland ecozone of Canada.

== Course ==
MacLennan River begins at MacLennan Lake at over 600 metres (2,000 ft) above sea level on the western slopes of the Thunder Hills. From there, it heads south then south-east through boreal forests and muskeg. There are several lakes along the course of the river en route to the western shore of Montreal Lake, including Tourist Lake, Wassegam Lake, Tibiska Lake, and O'Connor Lake.

The primary tributary for MacLennan River is Crean River. It originates at the 12,550.7-hectare (31,013-acre) Crean Lake south of MacLennan River's mainstem. Crean Lake is the largest lake in Prince Albert National Park. Crean River meets MacLennan River near Montreal Lake. The tributaries that flow into the river from the north originate in the Thunder Hills. Two highways, Highway 916 and Highway 2, cross MacLennan River.

== MacLennan River Recreation Site ==
MacLennan River Recreation Site is a provincial recreation site on the banks of the MacLennan River at the Highway 2 crossing. The park has six unserviced campsites, a picnic area, hiking trails, and access to the river for fishing. Walleye are a commonly caught fish in the river. The hiking trails follow the river upstream into Prince Albert National Park.

== See also ==
- List of rivers of Saskatchewan
- Hudson Bay drainage basin
