= Montreal Lake (Saskatchewan) =

Lake in Saskatchewan, Canada

- Location of Montreal Lake in Saskatchewan Montreal Lake (Canada)
- Location: Northern Administration District, Saskatchewan
- Coordinates: 54°20′N 105°40′W
- Etymology: City of Montreal
- Part of: Churchill River drainage basin
- Primary inflows: Waskesiu River
- River sources: Waskesiu Upland
- Primary outflows: Montreal River
- Basin countries: Canada
- Surface area: 46,457 ha (114,800 acres)
- Max. depth: 7.8 m (26 ft)
- Shore length^{1}: 284 km (176 mi)
- Surface elevation: 490 m (1,610 ft)
- Islands: Ferguson Island; Johnston Island
- Settlements: Montreal Lake; Timber Bay
- ^{1} Shore length is not a well-defined measure.

Montreal Lake is a lake in the north-central part of Canadian province of Saskatchewan. The lake was named after the city of Montreal. It is the source of the Montreal River and is located between Highways 2 and 969. Prince Albert National Park is to the west of the lake and Clarence-Steepbank Lakes Provincial Park is to the east. Communities on the lake include Montreal Lake, Timber Bay, and Molanosa.

== Description ==
Montreal Lake is a large lake that covers an area of 46,457 hectares (114,800 acres), is 7.8 metres (26 ft) deep, and has a shoreline measuring 284 kilometres (176 mi).

Montreal Lakes's catchment includes the northern slopes of the Waskesiu Hills and the southern and eastern slopes of the Thunder Hills. Waskasiu River is the primary inflow. It enters the lake at its south-western shore and its drainage basin includes the aforementioned Waskesiu Hills, Waskesiu Lake, and Kingsmere Lake. Also on the western shore is the Weyakwin River, which flows from Weyakwin Lake, and MacLennan River, which flows from the south side of the Thunder Hills. One of MacLennan River's tributaries, the Crean River, flows in from Crean Lake. At the southern tip of the lake, Bittern River flows in from Bittern Lake. Montreal River flows out of Montreal Lake at O'Connor Bay at the north end. Montreal River heads northward and flows into Lac la Ronge.

Two features of the lake were named after Canadian soldiers who died during World War II. O'Connor Bay was named after Stafford Thomas O'Connor and McKee Bay, on the lake's western shore, was named after Ferris Ross McKee.

== Fish species ==
Fish commonly found in Montreal Lake include walleye, yellow perch, northern pike, lake trout, lake whitefish, cisco, burbot, white sucker, lake whitefish, and longnose sucker.

== See also ==
- List of lakes of Saskatchewan
