= Crean Lake =

Lake in Saskatchewan, Canada

- Location in Saskatchewan Crean Lake (Canada)
- Location: Prince Albert National Park, Saskatchewan, Canada
- Coordinates: 54.0834°N 106.1505°W
- Part of: Churchill River drainage basin
- Primary inflows: Crean Channel
- Primary outflows: Crean River
- Basin countries: Canada
- Surface area: 12,550.7 ha (31,013 acres)
- Max. depth: 27.5 m (90 ft)
- Shore length^{1}: 79 km (49 mi)
- Surface elevation: 522 m (1,713 ft)
- Islands: Francis Kayina Island; Krachorow Francis Island; Big Island
- Settlements: None
- ^{1} Shore length is not a well-defined measure.

Crean Lake is a large lake in the Canadian province of Saskatchewan entirely within Prince Albert National Park. There are no roads to the lake and access is by watercraft from Hanging Heart Lakes or from hiking and cross-country ski trails. Activities include fishing, boating, and camping at several rustic campgrounds scattered around the lake.

Crean Lake's outflow is Crean River, which is a tributary of the MacLennan River. Crean Channel from Hanging Heart Lakes is the primary inflow.

== Description ==
Crean Lake, which is surrounded by boreal forest, is the largest lake within Prince Albert National Park. It has an area of 12,550.7 hectares (31,013 acres) and a shoreline of 79 kilometres (49 mi). Other large lakes nearby include Montreal to the east, Kingsmere to the west, and Waskesiu to the south. Crean River, the lake's outflow, exits from the eastern shore and flows northeast where it meets MacLennan River west of Montreal Lake. MacLennan River flows into Montreal Lake which is within the Churchill River drainage basin.

Over the winter of 1958–59, a dam was built at the lake's outflow. It was built "to increase public access to the lake and to increase water depths over lake trout shoals". The increased water levels caused "accelerated erosion" of the lake's shoreline. Over time, though, recession rates have declined as water levels stabilised.

== Recreation ==
Crean Lake, and its amenities, is accessed by watercraft from Crean Channel which flows in from Hanging Heart Lakes. Highway 204 provides access to Hanging Hearts Lake Marina at the southern end of Hanging Heart Lakes. Activities at Crean Lake include fishing, swimming, boating, and camping. Fishing is permitted on the lake from the Saturday before Victoria Day to Labour Day. A 19-kilometre (12 mi) long round-trip cross-country ski trail begins 500 metres (1,600 ft) south of Birch Bay Beach at Waskesiu Lake, runs north of Hanging Heart Lakes, and ends at Crean Lake Day Use Area (54.0308°N 106.2472°W) at Crean Channel.

Crean Lake has four "backcountry" campgrounds which are accessed by watercraft only.

- Crean Kitchen Campground (54.0336°N 106.2511°W) is on the northern shore of Crean Channel at the south-western part of Crean Lake. It has a picnic area, three campsites, and a kitchen shelter.
- Chipewyan Campground (54.0756°N 106.2870°W) is on the western shore of Crean Lake. It has three campsites and a beach for swimming.
- Moose Bay Campground (54.1499°N 106.1886°W) is on the sheltered Moose Bay at the north-western part of Crean Lake. It has two campsites and a sheltered kitchen.
- Big Island Campground (54.0868°N 106.0878°W) is on Big Island near Crean Lake's eastern shore. It has a sheltered kitchen and three campsites.

== Fish species ==
Fish commonly found in Crean Lake include northern pike, walleye, lake trout, yellow perch, and lake whitefish. The lake trout were commercially fished to near-extinction in the first part of the 20th century; there is currently a prohibition on fishing lake trout in Crean Lake.

== See also ==
- List of lakes of Saskatchewan
- Tourism in Saskatchewan
