= Montreal Lake 106 =

Indian reserve in Saskatchewan, Canada

Coordinates: 54°04′09″N 105°48′13″W

- Indian reserve
- Montreal Lake Indian Reserve No. 106
- Location in Saskatchewan
- First Nation: Montreal Lake
- Country: Canada
- Province: Saskatchewan

Area
  - Total: 5,957.1 ha (14,720 acres)

Montreal Lake 106 is an Indian reserve of the Montreal Lake Cree Nation in Saskatchewan. It is about 93 kilometres (58 mi) north of Prince Albert on the southern shore of Montreal Lake.

== See also ==
- List of Indian reserves in Saskatchewan
