= King Island (Saskatchewan) =

Island in Saskatchewan, Canada

Nickname: Devil's Island
- Interactive map of King Island

Geography
- Location: Saskatchewan
- Coordinates: 53°55′24″N 106°11′05″W

Administration
- Canada

King Island is a small island situated near the western shore of Waskesiu Lake. The island is named for William Lyon Mackenzie King, local Member of Parliament and Canadian prime minister who established Prince Albert National Park. The island features a hiking trail and picnic facilities. Prior to its current name, the island was known locally as Devil's Island due to a Cree legend that claimed it was inhabited by supernatural creatures of a mischievous or demonic nature.

== See also ==
- List of islands of Saskatchewan
