= Waskesiu Lake =

Lake in Prince Albert National Park, Saskatchewan, Canada

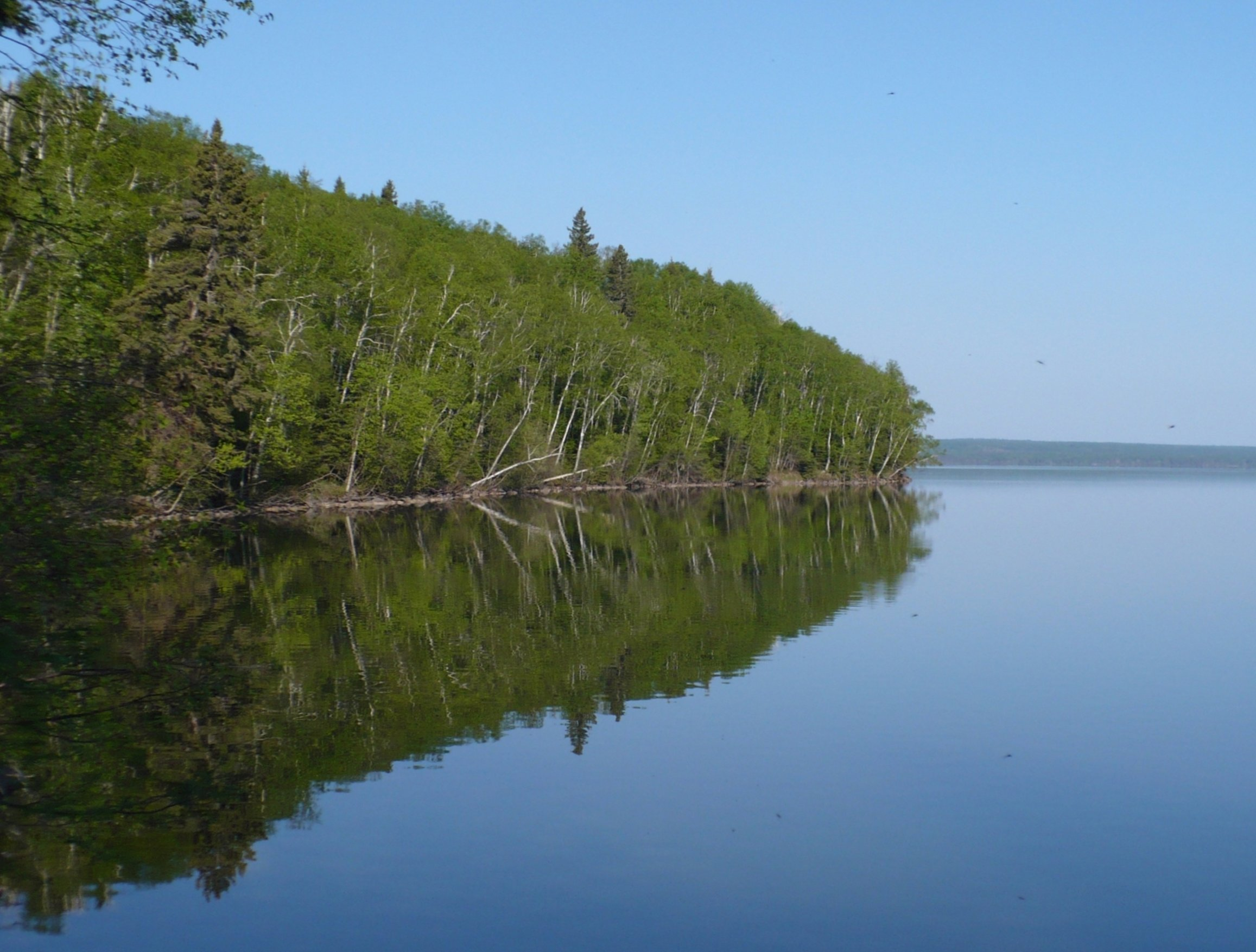
- Waskesiu Lake

- Location in Saskatchewan Waskesiu Lake (Canada)
- Location: Prince Albert National Park, Saskatchewan
- Coordinates: 53.9566°N 106.1955°W
- Part of: Churchill River drainage basin
- Primary inflows: Kingsmere River
- Primary outflows: Waskesiu River
- Basin countries: Canada
- Surface area: 7,107.7 ha (17,564 acres)
- Max. depth: 19 m (62 ft)
- Shore length^{1}: 114 km (71 mi)
- Surface elevation: 532 m (1,745 ft)
- Islands: King Island
- Settlements: Waskesiu Lake
- ^{1} Shore length is not a well-defined measure.

Waskesiu Lake (/ˌwɑːskəˈsuː/) is a lake located roughly in the centre of Prince Albert National Park. The lake's name means red deer or elk in the Cree language, which it was at least once recorded as in 1912. Waskesiu Lake is by far the most developed lake in the park, and features a variety of recreational facilities along all sides of its shoreline, including camping, golfing, boating, and hiking. The resort village of Waskesiu Lake is on its eastern shore. The Prince Albert National Park Nature Centre is located in the village as well as many other amenities such as lodging, police, a gas station, shopping, and restaurants. Access to the lake is from Highways 263 and 264.

== Description ==
Waskesiu Lake sits north-east of the Waskesiu Hills and is in the Churchill River drainage basin. The south flowing rivers out of the Waskesiu Hills, including Spruce and Spruce Rivers, flow into the North Saskatchewan River and the ones flowing north out of the hills flow into the Waskesiu Lake catchment. Some of these rivers include Deadwood Creek, Beetle Creek, Moose Creek, and Beartrap Creek. Prince Albert National Park's third largest lake, Kingsmere Lake, connects to Waskasiu Lake at its northern end via Kingsmere River. The Waskesiu River, located at the east end of the lake, is the outflow and it heads north-east to Montreal Lake.

Waskesiu Lake has one island off its western shore known as King Island (formerly Devil's Island). It is named after park founder and Canada's 10th prime minister, William Lyon Mackenzie King.

== Recreation ==
Being the recreational centre of Prince Albert National Park, there are a wide variety of activities in and around the lake, including camping at Beaver Glen, Narrows, and Red Deer Campgrounds. At the village of Waskesiu, there are resorts and cabins such as Baker's Bungalows and Lost Creek Resort Waskesiu Golf Course is located on the south side of the village. Several trails begin at the lake, including one that leads to Grey Owl's cabin at Ajawaan Lake. Several beaches also are scattered around the lake including, Birch Bay Beach, Trippes Beach, Paignton Beach, Narrows Beach, and Waskesiu Main Beach.

== Fish species ==
Fish commonly found in Waskesiu Lake include walleye, northern pike, yellow perch, and cisco.

== See also ==
- List of lakes of Saskatchewan
- List of place names in Canada of Indigenous origin
- Tourism in Saskatchewan
