= Kingsmere Lake =

Lake in Saskatchewan, Canada

- Location in Saskatchewan Kingsmere Lake (Canada)
- Location: Prince Albert National Park, Saskatchewan
- Coordinates: 54.1001°N 106.4505°W
- Part of: Churchill River drainage basin
- Primary inflows: Bagwa Lake Channel
- River sources: Waskesiu Upland
- Primary outflows: Kingsmere River
- Basin countries: Canada
- Surface area: 5,912.7 ha (14,611 acres)
- Max. depth: 45.1 m (148 ft)
- Shore length^{1}: 38 km (24 mi)
- Surface elevation: 535 m (1,755 ft)
- Settlements: None
- ^{1} Shore length is not a well-defined measure.

Kingsmere Lake is a lake surrounded by boreal forest in the Canadian province of Saskatchewan. At 5,912.7 hectares (14,611 acres) in size and over 45.1 metres (148 ft) deep, it is a large lake in the Waskesiu Upland of central Saskatchewan. Several creeks and rivers feed the lake from the surrounding hills and, at the southern end of the lake, the outlet — Kingsmere River — flows south into Waskesiu Lake. The lake is within the Churchill River drainage basin.

Kingsmere Lake is entirely within Prince Albert National Park. It has seven campgrounds, access to Grey Owl's cabin on Ajawaan Lake, hiking trails, canoeing, boating, and fishing. Access to the lake is from a trail that begins at the end of Kingsmere Road and follows the Kingsmere River northward.

== Campgrounds, trails, and canoe routes ==
There are seven backcountry campgrounds on Kingsmere Lake, four of which are on the Grey Owl Trail. The Grey Owl Trail is 19.9 kilometres (12.4 mi) long and traverses the eastern shore of the lake from Kingsmere River to Grey Owl's cabin. One campground is on Kingsmere River Trail and the other two are only accessible by boat. The Kingsmere River Trail is 1.5 kilometres (0.93 mi) long and follows the western bank of the Kingsmere River to the southern end of lake. Boat access to Kingsmere Lake is via a 1 km (0.62 mi) long rail car portage that bypasses the rapids at the head of Kingsmere River.

- Westwind Group Campground — the first campground on Grey Owl Trail, it is on the south-eastern corner of the lake
- Chipewyan Portage Campground — the second campground on the trail, it is situated on the eastern shore of the lake at the western end of an historical portage between Crean Lake and Kingsmere Lake
- Sandy Beach Campground — the third campground on the trail, it is on the north-eastern shore
- Northend Campground and Group Camping — the final campground on the trail, is on the northern shore
- Southend Campground — is at the end of the Kingsmere River Trail and has a kitchen shelter
- Bladebone Bay Campground — is on the north-western shore and is only accissble by boat
- Pease Point Campground — is on the western shore at the mouth of the Bagwa Lake Channel

=== Bagwa Canoe Route ===
The Bagwa Canoe Route is a canoe route that begins at the southern end of Kingsmere Lake, follows the western shore, traverses the Bagwa Lake Channel, and goes through three other lakes. The route is well marked and takes 7 to 10 hours to complete. Besides the campgrounds on Kingsmere Lake, there are two more campgrounds on the canoe route — one on Bagwa Lake and the other on Lily Lake.

Beginning at the rail car portage and Southend Campground, the canoe route follows the western shore of Kingsmere Lake to Bagwa Lake Channel and Pease Campground. The route then follows the channel to Bagwa Lake. Bagwa Lake Campground is at the southern end of Bagwa Lake. The route then follows a creek into Lily Lake. Lily Lake Campground is on the eastern shore of Lily Lake. At the south-eastern end of Lily Lake is a 200-metre (660 ft) long portage that goes to Clare Lake. At the eastern end of Clare lake is another 200-metre (660 ft) long portage that goes back to Kingsmere Lake.

== Fish species ==
Fish commonly found in Kingsmere Lake include northern pike, walleye, and lake trout.

== See also ==
- List of lakes of Saskatchewan
- Tourism in Saskatchewan
