= Ajawaan Lake =

Lake in Saskatchewan, Canada

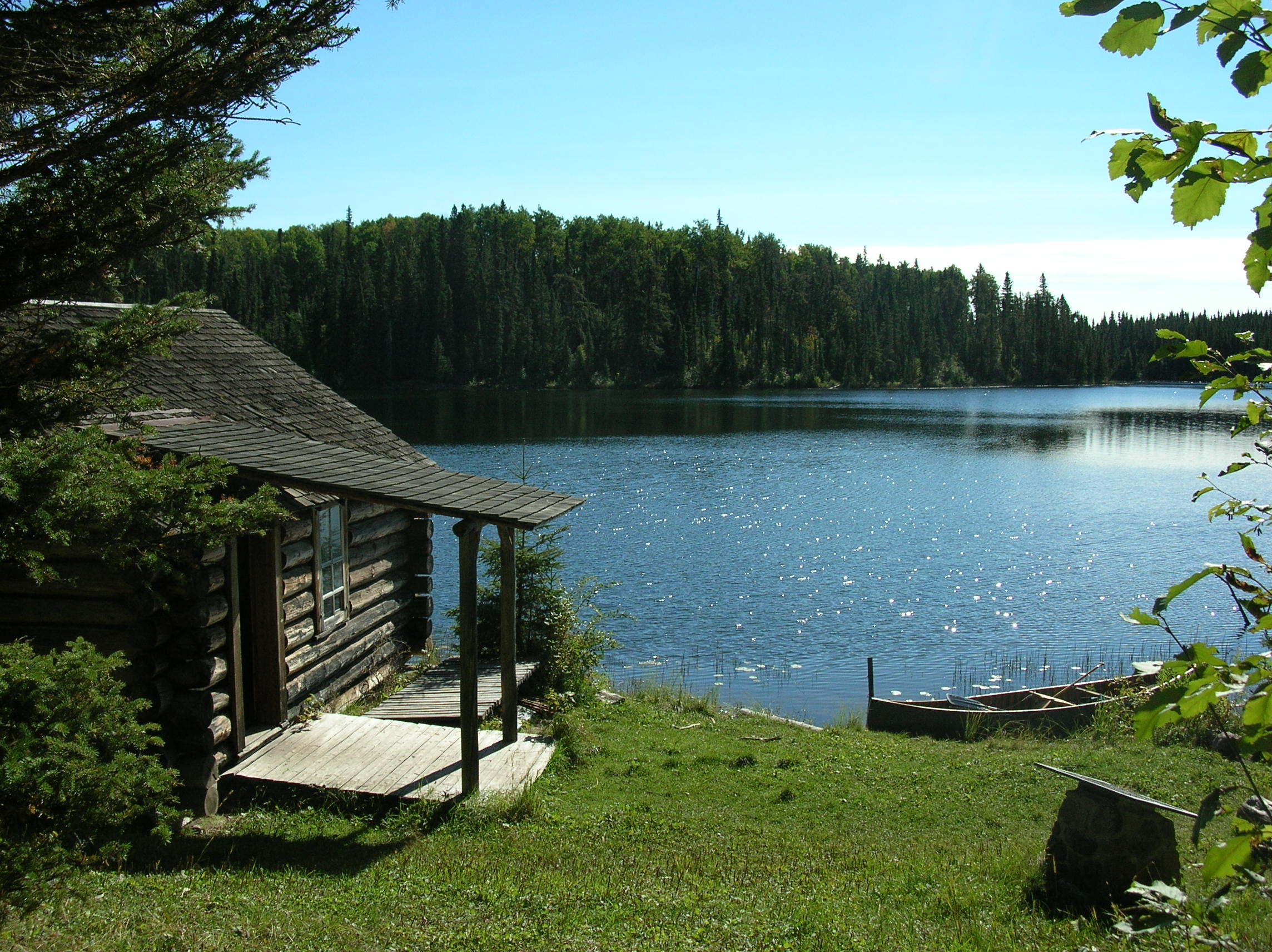
- Grey Owl's cabin "Beaverlodge"

- Location within Saskatchewan Location within Canada
- Location: Prince Albert National Park, Saskatchewan
- Coordinates: 54°8′N 106°27′W
- Part of: Churchill River drainage basin
- Primary inflows: meltwater
- Basin countries: Canada
- Max. length: 2 km (1.2 mi)
- Max. width: 500 m (1,600 ft)
- Surface area: 55 ha (140 acres)
- Shore length^{1}: 5 km (3.1 mi)
- ^{1} Shore length is not a well-defined measure.

Ajawaan Lake is a lake in the northern boreal forest portion of Prince Albert National Park in the Canadian province of Saskatchewan, 700 metres (2,300 ft) from the north end of Kingsmere Lake via a wide portage trail. It is known mainly as the home of Grey Owl, famed naturalist, from 1932 to 1938. Access is via a 20-kilometre (12 mi) trail from the Kingsmere River up the west side of Kingsmere Lake, or by canoe or small boat via the Kingsmere River, Kingsmere River rail push-cart portage and Kingsmere Lake. The lake has native northern pike and walleye fish, as well as resident beavers.

The trail to Grey Owl's cabin is 2.75 kilometres (1.71 mi) around the western edge of the lake. There are two cabins on the north shore, one at the water's edge where beavers had built a lodge partly inside and a second up the hill behind. The second cabin was built for Grey Owl's wife, Anahareo, who disliked sharing the cabin with beavers. The graves of Grey Owl, Anahereo, and their daughter Shirley Dawn are west of the upper cabin. There are interpretative signs at the cabin site. Parks Canada has restored both the cabins several times and the beaver lodge in the lower cabin is a partial reconstruction only.

== Gallery ==
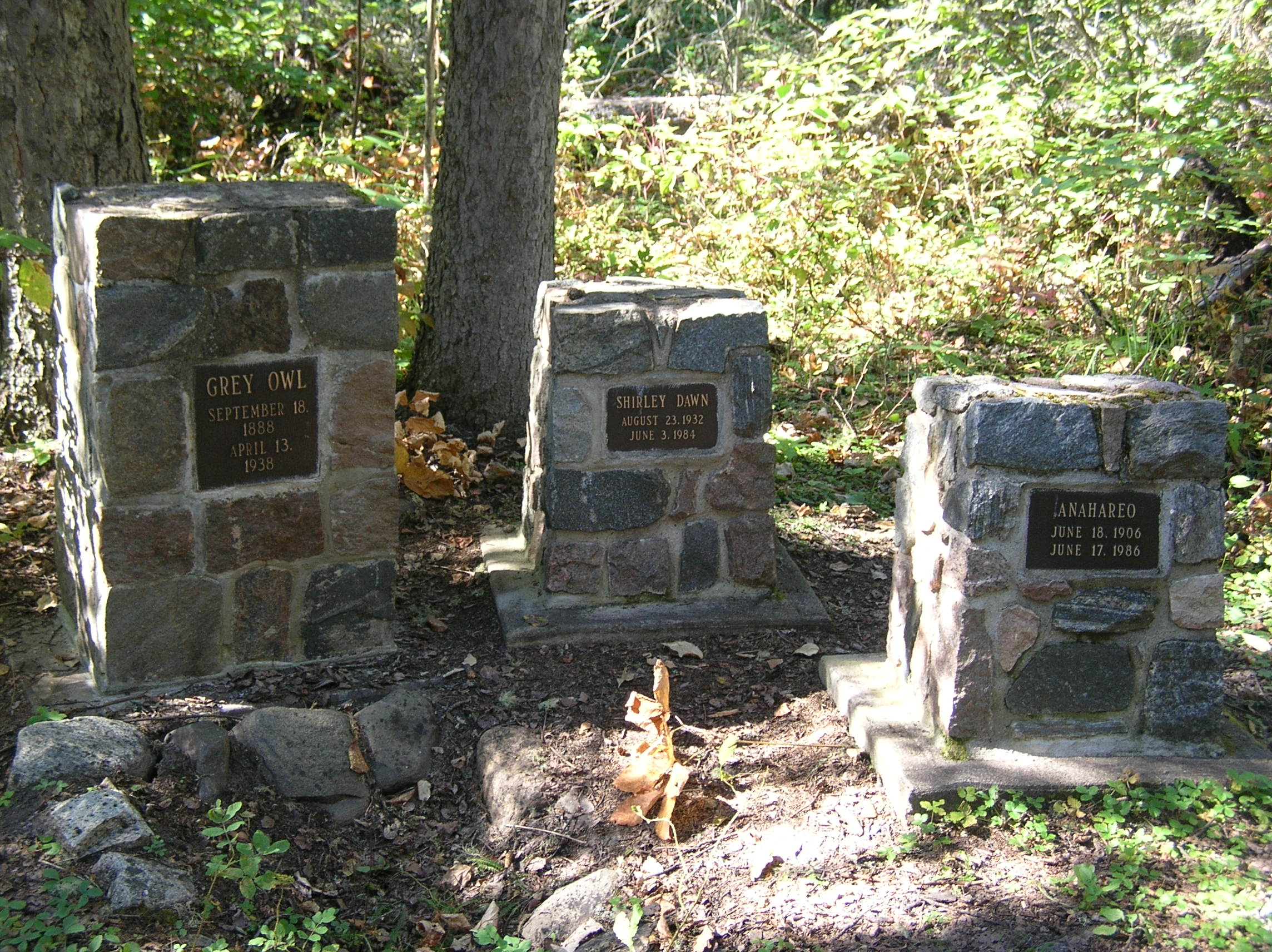
Graves of Grey Owl, Anahareo and Shirley Dawn at Ajawaan Lake.

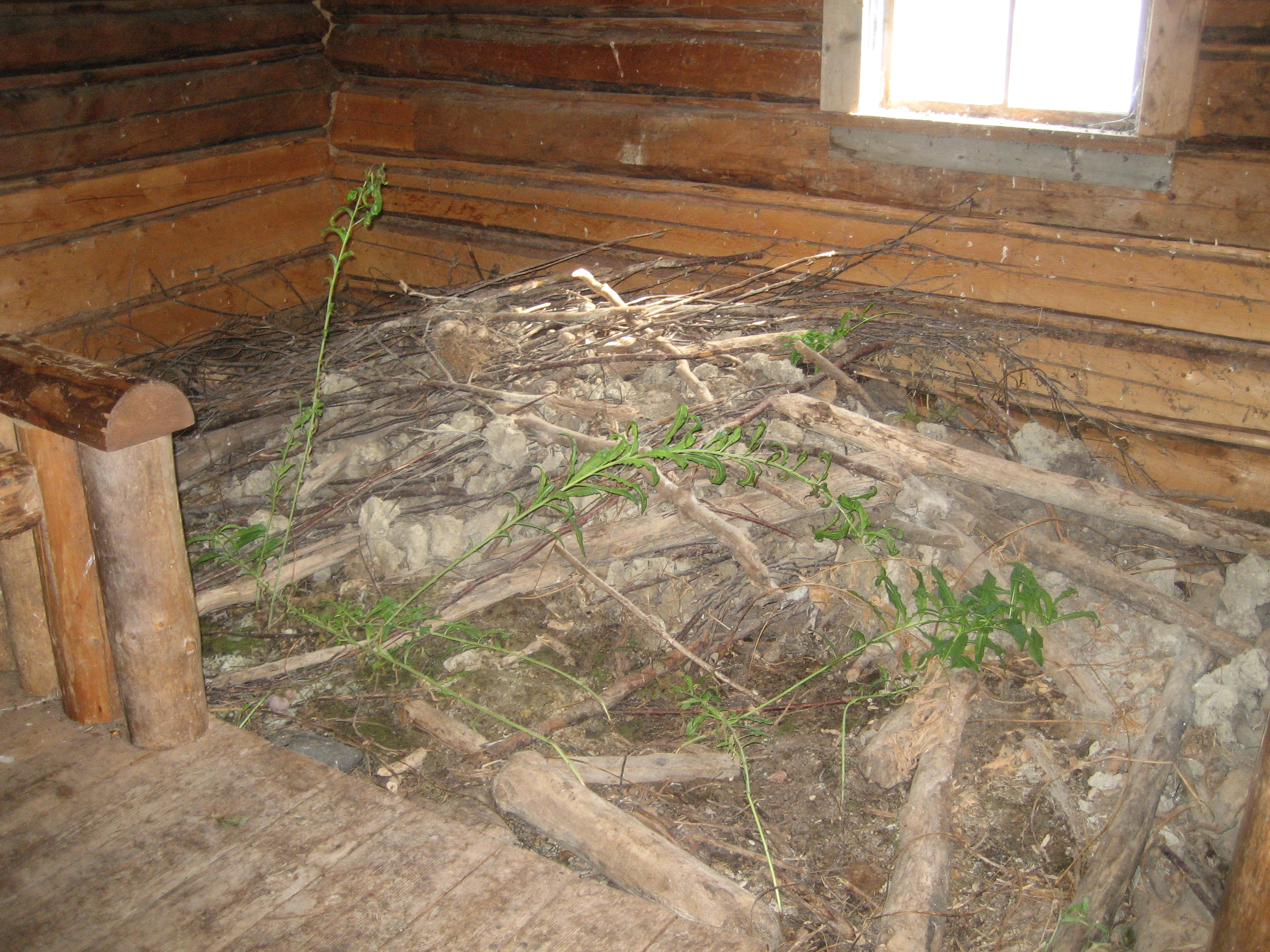
The beaver lodge inside Grey Owl's cabin.

== See also ==
- List of lakes of Saskatchewan
