= Martin Lake (Saskatchewan) =

Lake in Saskatchewan, Canada

- Location in Saskatchewan Martin Lake (Canada)
- Location: Northern Administration District, Saskatchewan
- Coordinates: 59.5535°N 108.6215°W
- Type: Glacial lake
- Part of: Mackenzie River drainage basin
- Primary inflows: Fredette River
- River sources: Canadian Shield
- Primary outflows: Gillis Channel
- Basin countries: Canada
- Surface area: 1,007 ha (2,490 acres)
- Max. depth: 43.7 m (143 ft)
- Shore length^{1}: 40 km (25 mi)
- Settlements: Uranium City
- ^{1} Shore length is not a well-defined measure.

Martin Lake is a remote northern lake in the Canadian province of Saskatchewan. It is about 3.3 kilometres (2.1 mi) from Uranium City and access is from Highway 962. There is extensive uranium mining in the vicinity of the lake.

== Description ==
Martin Lake is adjacent to Beaverlodge Lake near Lake Athabasca in the Canadian Shield. Its primary infow is Fredette River and its outflow is Gillies Channel. Gillies Channel is a short channel that connects to Beaverlodge Lake.

Martin Lake is an irregularly shaped lake with two large bays connected to each other. It covers an area of 1,007 hectares (2,490 acres), has a maximum depth of 43.7 metres (143 ft), and a shoreline measuring about 40 kilometres (25 mi).

== Uranium mining ==
There has been extensive Uranium exploration in the area surrounding the lake. These mining operations have affected the water quality in Martin Lake and its surroundings, leading to elevated levels of contaminants such as uranium and selenium in local fish populations.

Martin Lake Mine is situated at the north-east corner of the lake, at the neck of land that separates it from Beaverlodge Lake.

== Fish species ==
Fish commonly found in Martin Lake include walleye, lake trout, northern pike, cisco, longnose sucker, white sucker, burbot, lake whitefish, and yellow perch.

== See also ==
- List of lakes of Saskatchewan
- List of mines in Saskatchewan
