= Fredette Lake =

Lake in Saskatchewan, Canada

- Location in Saskatchewan Fredette Lake (Canada)
- Location: Northern Administration District, Saskatchewan
- Coordinates: 59°37′01″N 108°32′03″W
- Part of: Mackenzie River drainage basin
- Primary inflows: Fredette River
- River sources: Canadian Shield
- Primary outflows: Fredette River
- Basin countries: Canada
- Surface area: 567.4 ha (1,402 acres)
- Max. depth: 38.1 m (125 ft)
- Shore length^{1}: 26 km (16 mi)
- Surface elevation: 318 m (1,043 ft)
- Islands: Dewar Island
- Settlements: None
- ^{1} Shore length is not a well-defined measure.

Fredette Lake is a remote northern lake in the Canadian province of Saskatchewan. It is along the course of Fredette River, about 6.5 kilometres (4.0 mi) north-east of Uranium City. Uranium City sits at the mouth of Fredette River on Martin Lake. Fredette Lake has several islands, the largest of which is Dewar Island. Dewar Island is named after Francis Irving Dewar.

Since all of the northern mining operations are downstream of Fredette Lake, it is commonly used as a reference site to determine normal background levels when studying other surrounding areas near Uranium City.

== Fish species ==
Fish commonly found in Fredette Lake include lake trout and lake whitefish.

== See also ==
- List of lakes of Saskatchewan
