= Riou Lake =

Lake in Saskatchewan, Canada

- Location in Saskatchewan Riou Lake (Canada)
- Location: Northern Administration District, Saskatchewan
- Coordinates: 59.1066°N 106.267°W
- Type: Glacial lake
- Part of: Mackenzie River drainage basin
- Primary inflows: Riou River
- Primary outflows: Riou River
- Basin countries: Canada
- Surface area: 16,378.4 ha (40,472 acres)
- Max. depth: 35.3 m (116 ft)
- Shore length^{1}: 189 km (117 mi)
- Surface elevation: 236 m (774 ft)
- Settlements: None
- ^{1} Shore length is not a well-defined measure.

Riou Lake, at 16,378.4 hectares (40,472 acres) in size, is a large glacial lake along the course of Riou River in the far northern part of the Canadian province of Saskatchewan. The lake is south of Lake Athabasca in the Northern Saskatchewan Administration District. Stony Rapids, a "two-hour ATV ride" to the east, is the closest community. There are no settlements along the lake's shoreline, only a remote fishing camp called Riou Lake Outpost.

Riou Lake's main inflow, the Riou River, begins south of the lake at Luffman Lake and flows into the southern shore. The Riou River exits Riou Lake at the western end and flows west into Engler and Richards Lakes. Otherside River flows from Richards Lake's northern shore into Lake Athabasca. Lake Athabasca is within the Mackenzie River drainage basin.

== Fish species ==
Fish commonly found in Riou Lake include burbot, cisco, lake trout, lake whitefish, longnose sucker, northern pike, round whitefish, walleye, and white sucker.

== See also ==
- List of lakes of Saskatchewan
- Tourism in Saskatchewan
