= Davey Lake =

Davey Lake may refer to:

- Davey Lake (Alberta)
- Davey Lake (Saskatchewan)

== See also ==
- Davy Lake
