= Ena Lake =

Ena Lake may refer to:

Canada

- Ena Lake, Ontario
- Ena Lake (Saskatchewan)
