= List of lakes of Saskatchewan =

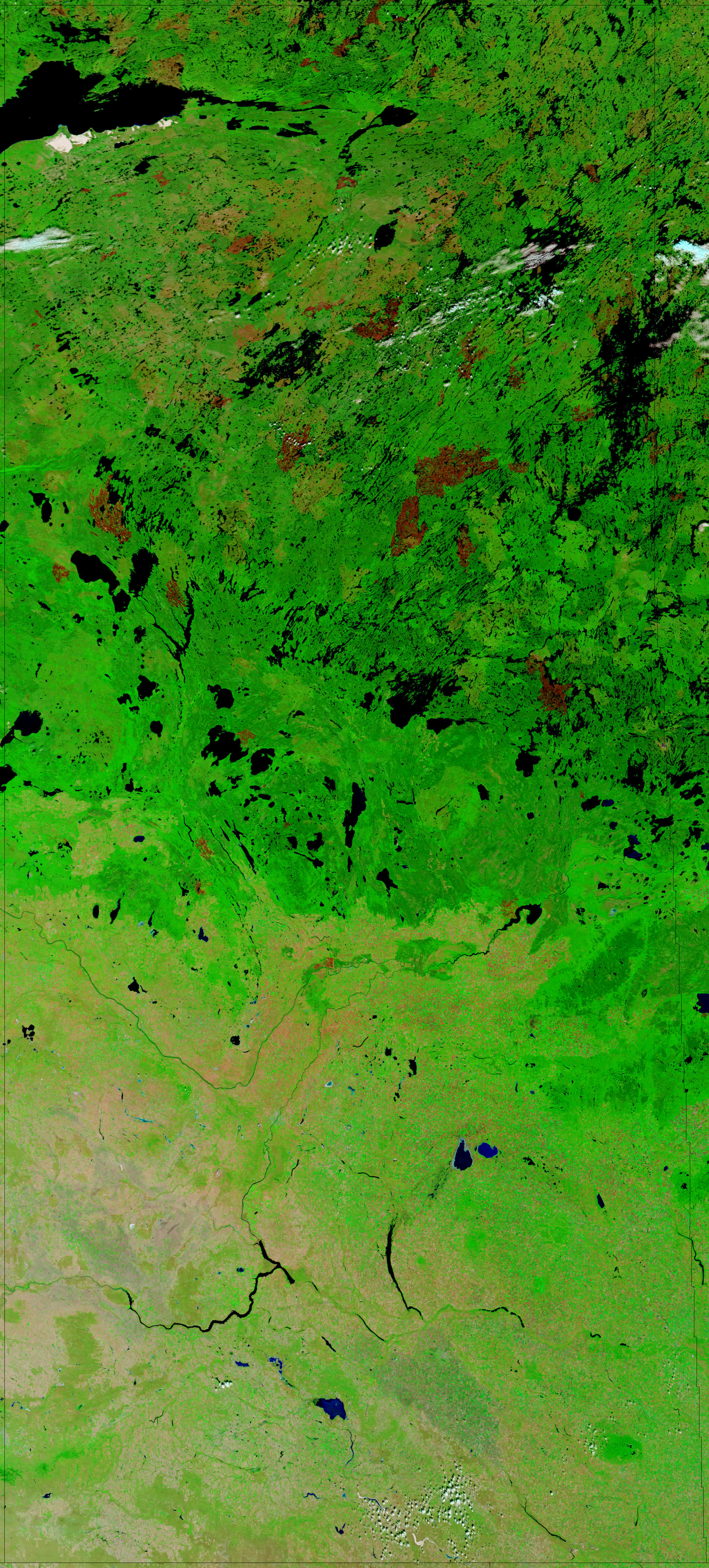
NASA image of Saskatchewan and a portion of Manitoba.

This is a list of lakes of Saskatchewan, a province of Canada. The largest and most notable lakes are listed at the start, followed by an alphabetical listing of other lakes of the province.

== Larger lake statistics ==
"The total area of a lake includes the area of islands. Lakes lying across provincial boundaries are listed in the province with the greater lake area."

Saskatchewan lakes larger than 400 km^{2} (150 sq mi)
Lake	Area (includes islands)	Altitude	Depth max.	Volume
Lake Athabasca	7,935 km^{2} (3,064 sq mi)	213 m (699 ft)	124 m (407 ft)	204 km^{3} (49 cu mi)
Reindeer Lake	6,650 km^{2} (2,570 sq mi)	337 m (1,106 ft)	219 m (719 ft)	95.25 km^{3} (22.85 cu mi)
Wollaston Lake	2,681 km^{2} (1,035 sq mi)	398 m (1,306 ft)	97 m (318 ft)	39.8 km^{3} (9.5 cu mi)
Cree Lake	1,434 km^{2} (554 sq mi)	487 m (1,598 ft)	60 m (200 ft)	17.6 km^{3} (4.2 cu mi)
Lac la Ronge	1,413 km^{2} (546 sq mi)	364 m (1,194 ft)	42.1 m (138 ft)	17.6 km^{3} (4.2 cu mi)
Peter Pond Lake	778 km^{2} (300 sq mi)	421 m (1,381 ft)	24 m (79 ft)	10.6 km^{3} (2.5 cu mi)
Doré Lake	640 km^{2} (250 sq mi)	459 m (1,506 ft)	20.4 m (67 ft)	6.68 km^{3} (1.60 cu mi)
Churchill Lake	559 km^{2} (216 sq mi)	421 m (1,381 ft)	24 m (79 ft)	4.88 km^{3} (1.17 cu mi)
Deschambault Lake	542 km^{2} (209 sq mi)	324 m (1,063 ft)	22.4 m (73 ft)	3.35 km^{3} (0.80 cu mi)
Frobisher Lake	516 km^{2} (199 sq mi)	421 m (1,381 ft)	19 m (62 ft)	2.18 km^{3} (0.52 cu mi)
Black Lake	464 km^{2} (179 sq mi)	281 m (922 ft)		
Montreal Lake	454 km^{2} (175 sq mi)	490 m (1,610 ft)		
Primrose Lake	448 km^{2} (173 sq mi)	599 m (1,965 ft)		
Amisk Lake	430 km^{2} (170 sq mi)	294 m (965 ft)		
Lake Diefenbaker	430 km^{2} (170 sq mi)	556.8 m (1,827 ft)	66 m (217 ft)	9.4 km^{3} (2.3 cu mi)
Pinehouse Lake	404 km^{2} (156 sq mi)	384 m (1,260 ft)		

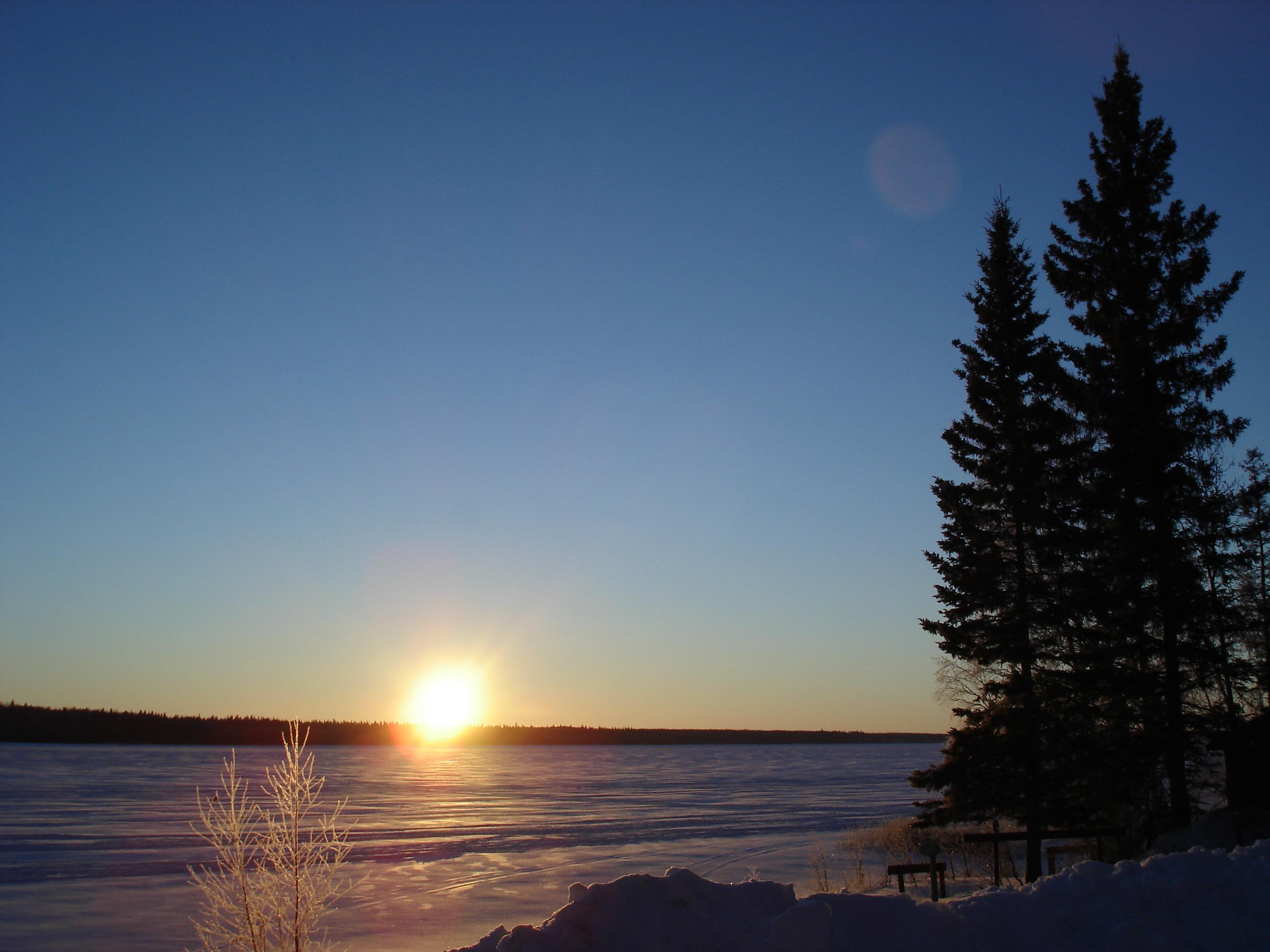
Sunrise over frozen Christopher Lake

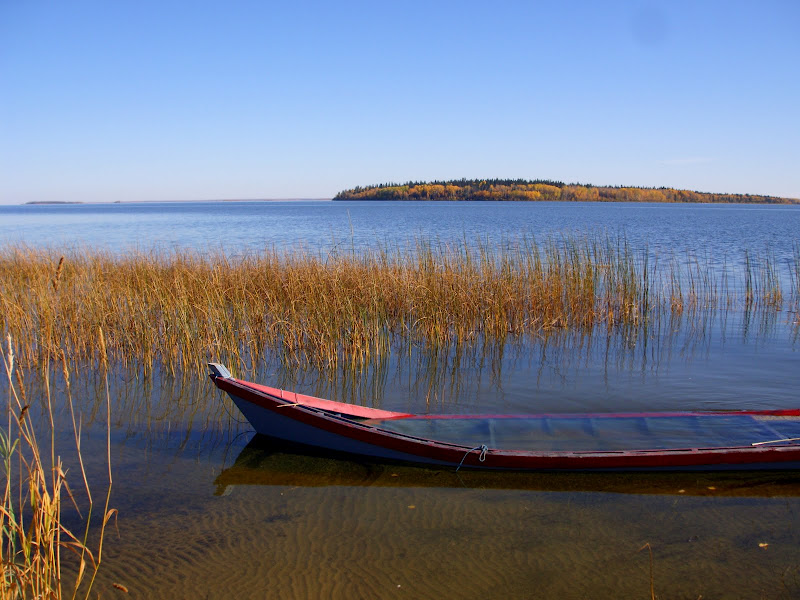
Churchill Lake at Buffalo Narrows

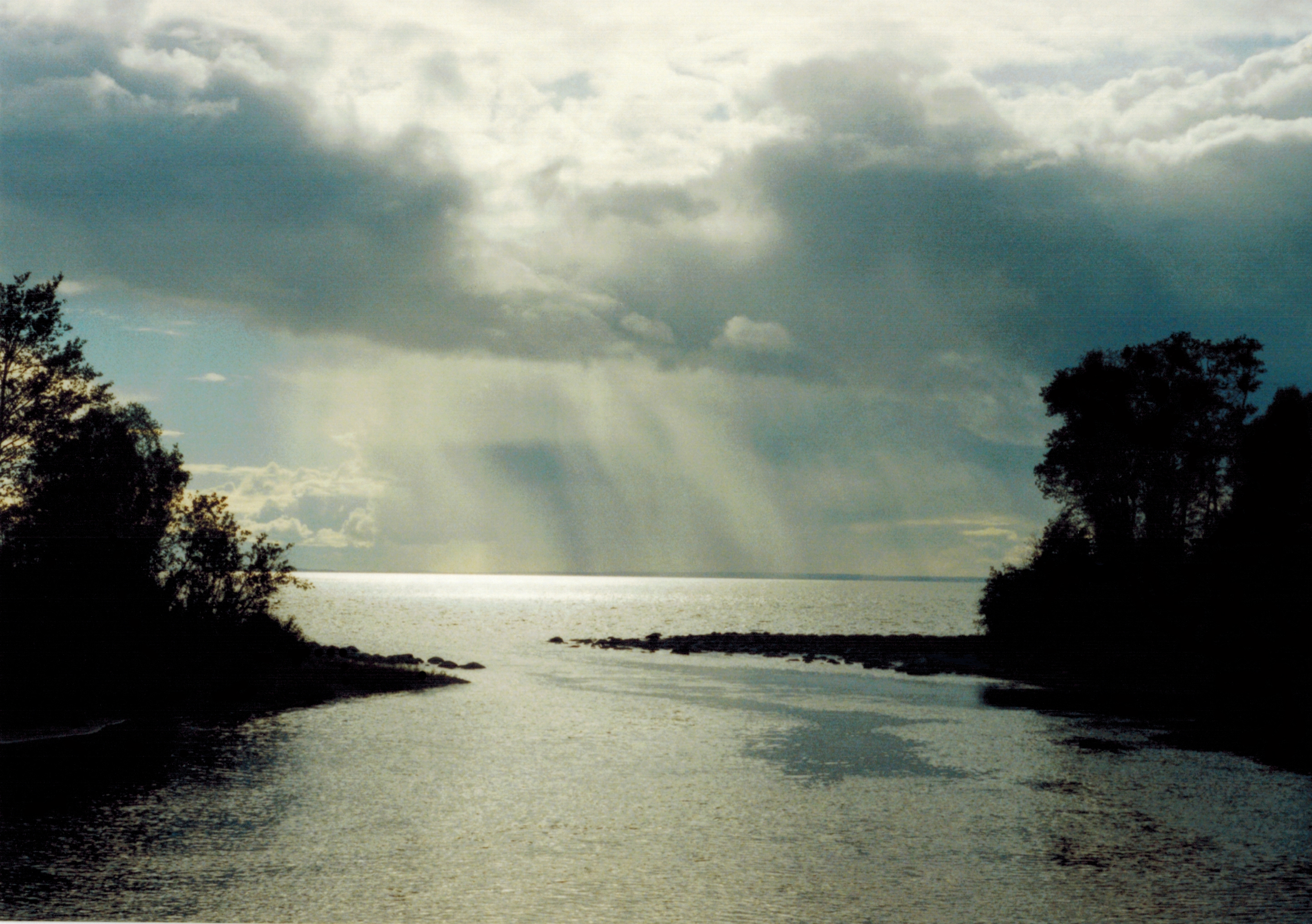
Cold Lake viewed from Meadow Lake Provincial Park

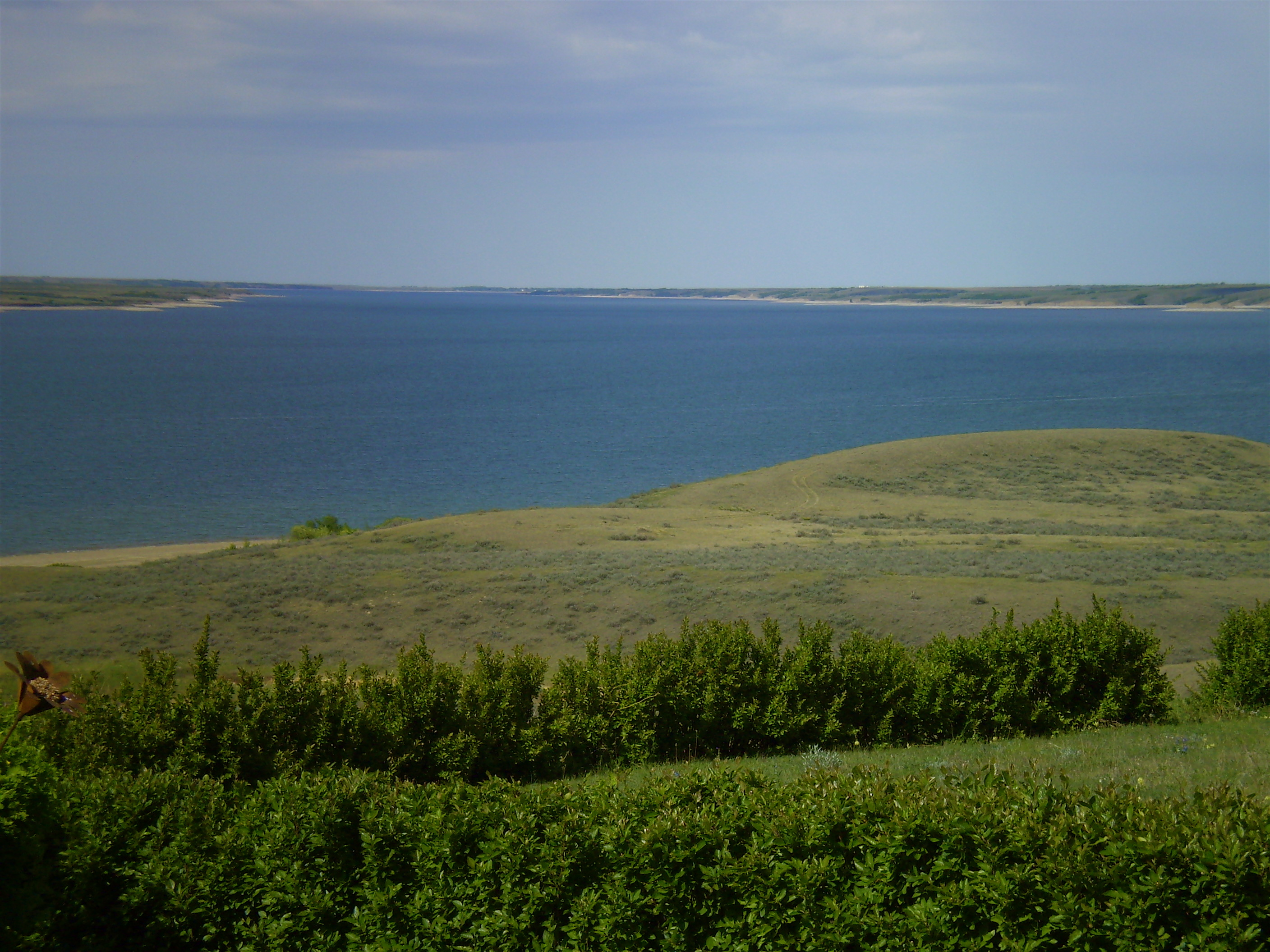
Lake Diefenbaker

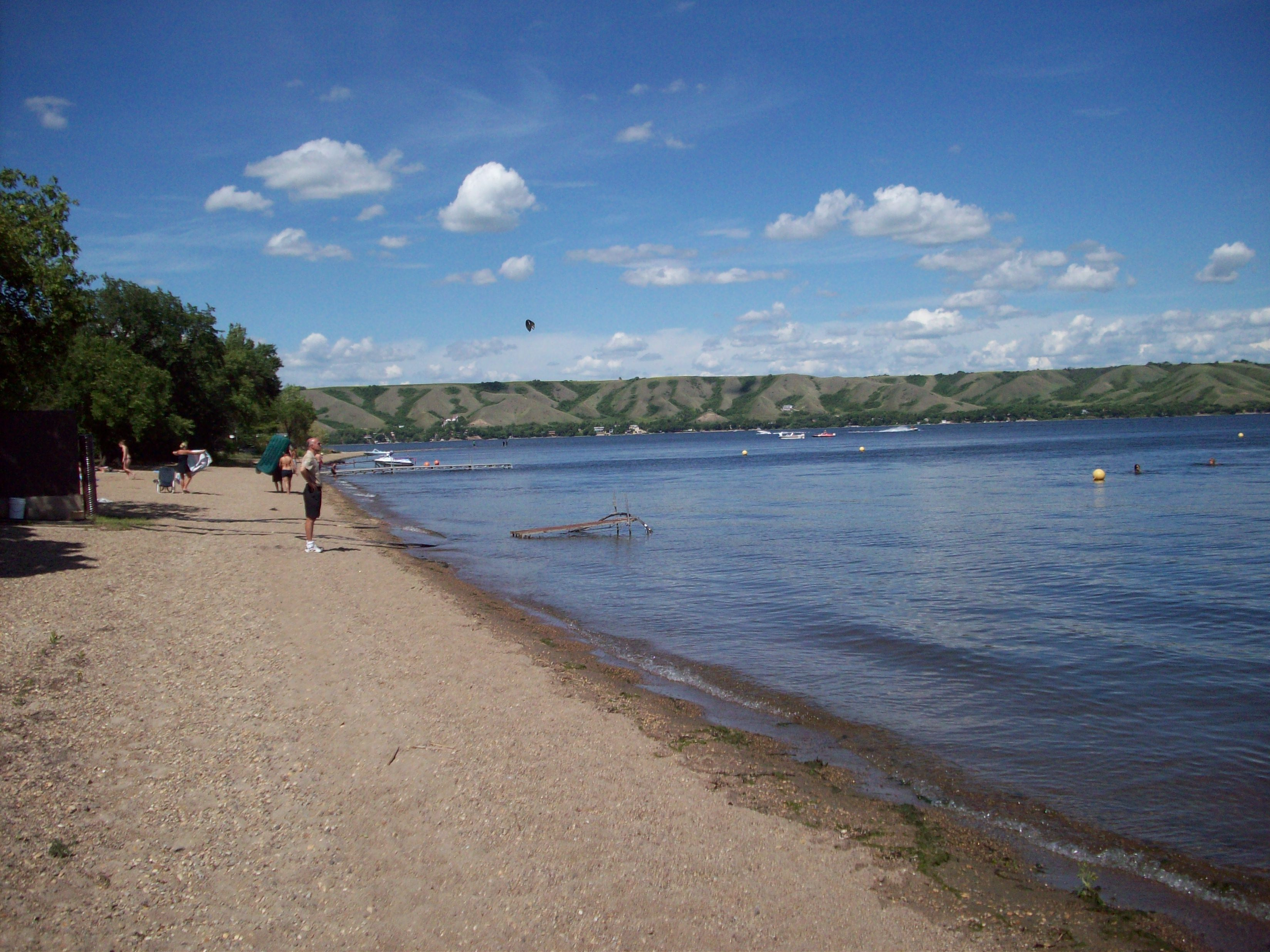
B-Say-Tah Point on Echo Lake

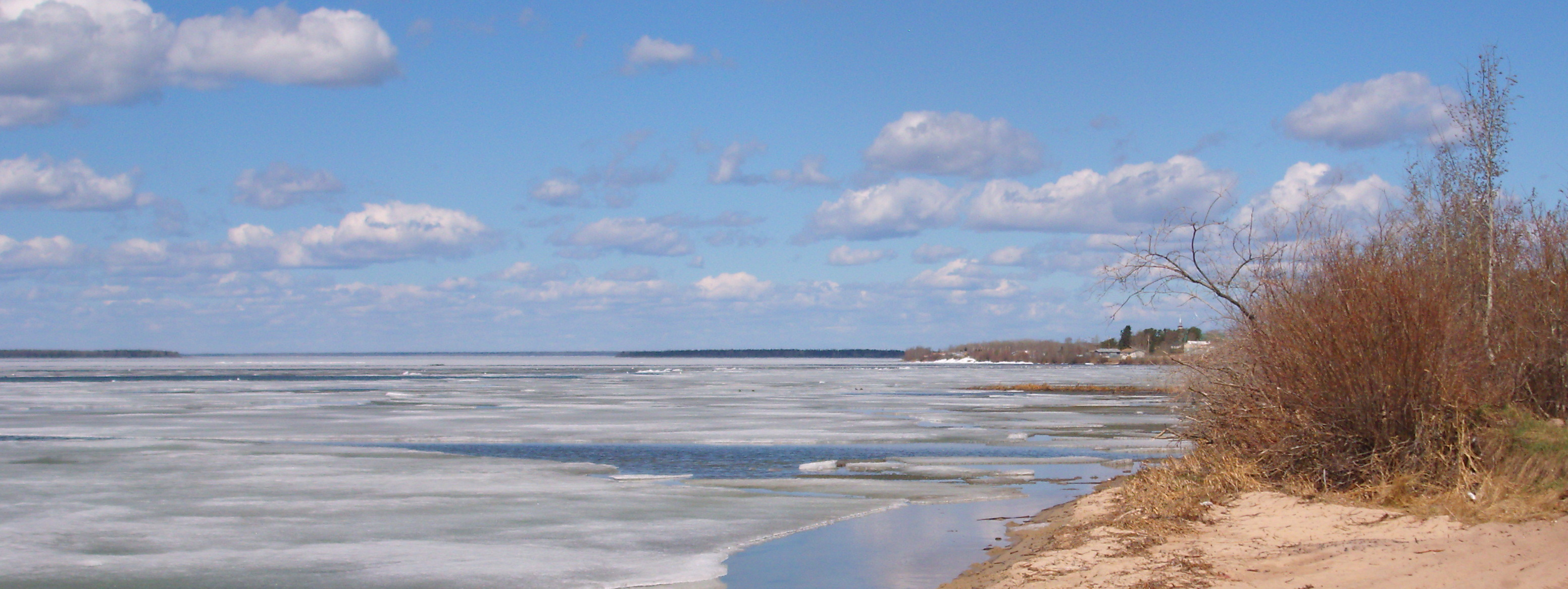
Ice break-up on Lac La Loche

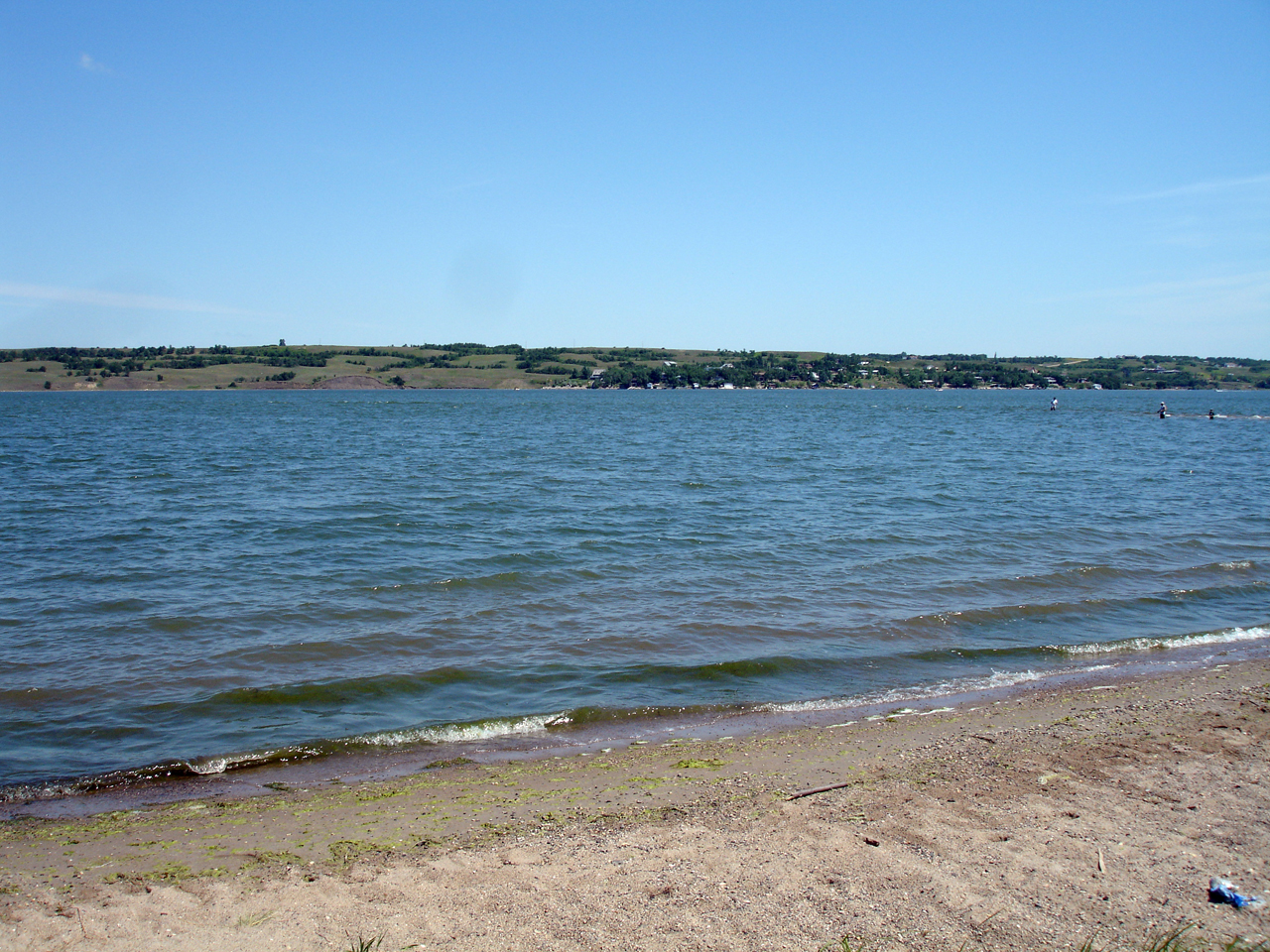
Last Mountain Lake

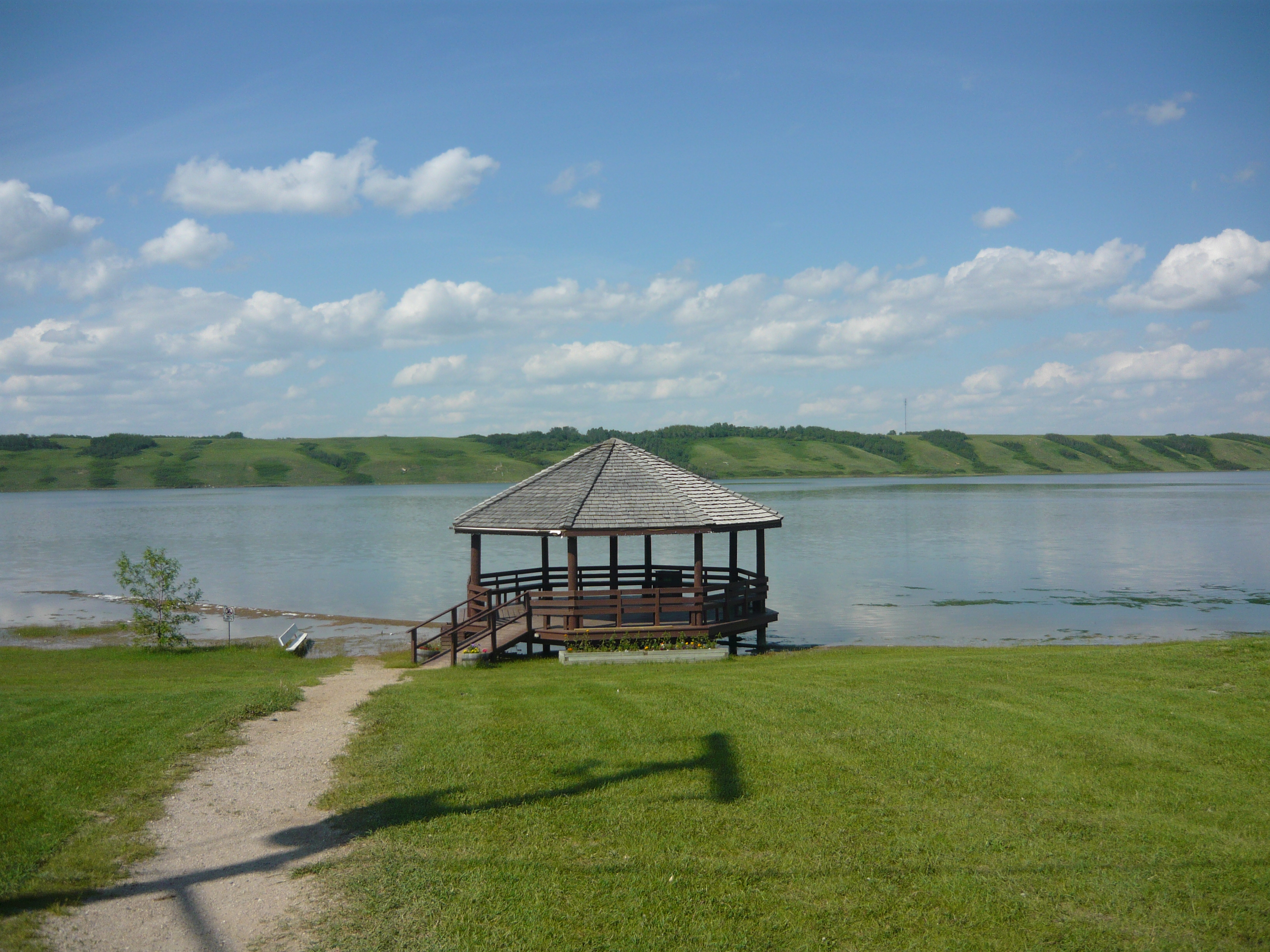
Little Manitou Lake

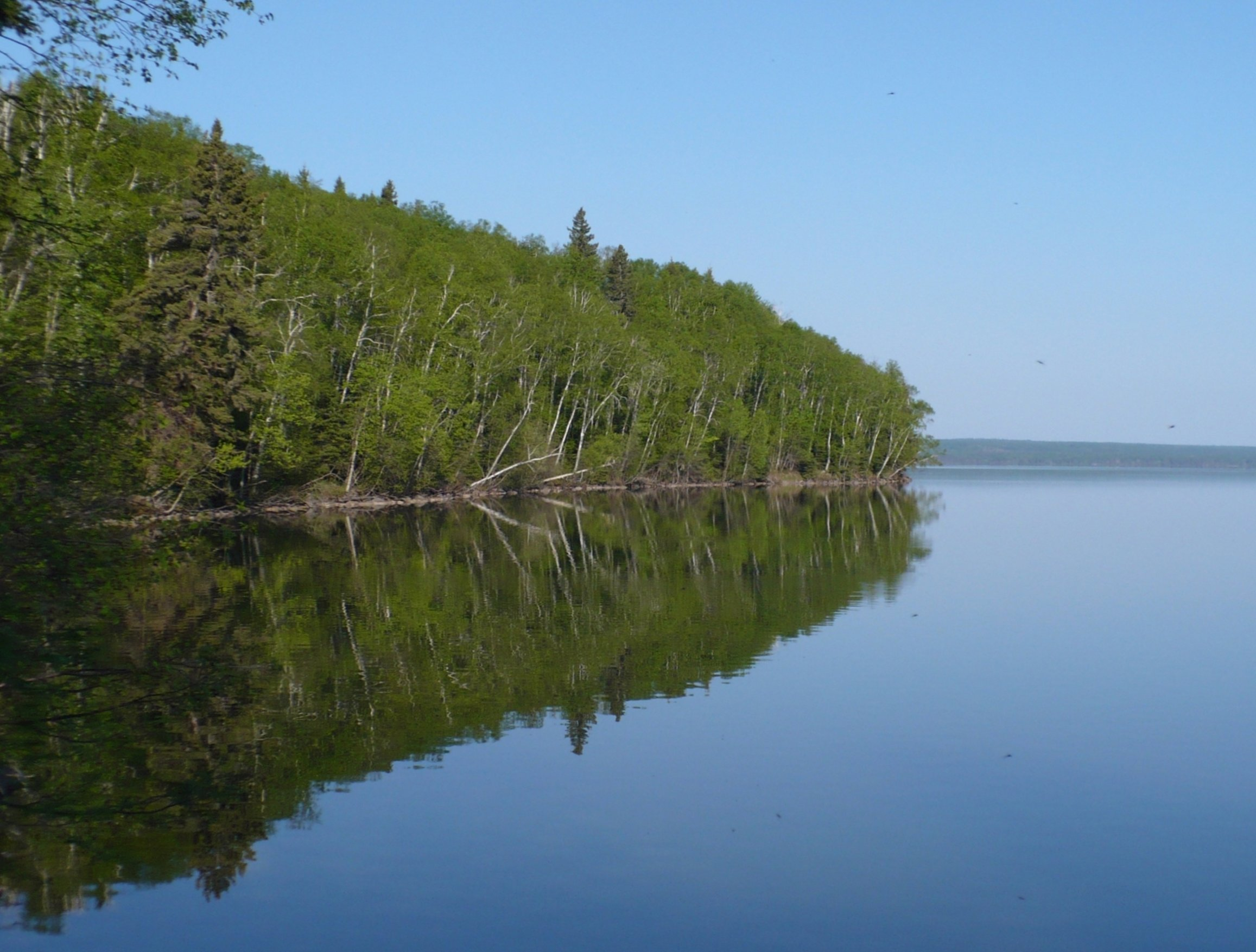
Waskesiu Lake in Prince Albert National Park

== A ==
- Admiral Reservoir
- Lake Agassiz
- Ajawaan Lake
- Alsask Lake
- Amisk Lake
- Anderson Lake
- Anglin Lake
- Antelope Lake
- Arm Lake
- Armit Lake
- Lake Athabasca
- Athapapuskow Lake
- Attitti Lake
- Atton Lake

== B ==
- Baldy Lake
- Barrier Lake
- Basin Lake
- Beatty Lake
- Beaupré Lake
- Beaver Lake
- Beaverlodge Lake
- Belcher Lake
- Besnard Lake
- Big Muddy Lake
- Big Sandy Lake
- Big Shell Lake
- Bigstick Lake
- Birchbark Lake
- Black Lake
- Blackstrap Lake
- Black Bear Island Lake
- Bolton Lake
- Boundary Dam Reservoir
- Braddock Reservoir
- Bradwell Reservoir
- Brightsand Lake
- Brightwater Reservoir
- Broderick Reservoir
- Buffalo Pound Lake
- Buffer Lake
- Bulrush Lake

== C ==
- Cabri Lake
- Candle Lake
- Cannington Lake
- Canoe Lake
- Castlewood Lake
- Chaplin Lake
- Charron Lake
- Cheviot Lake
- Chicken Lake
- Chitek Lake
- Christopher Lake
- Churchill Lake
- Clearwater Lake
- Clarence Lake
- Codette Lake
- Cold Lake
- Costigan Lake
- Courtenay Lake
- Cowan Lake
- Crean Lake
- Cree Lake
- Crooked Lake
- Crystal Lake
- Culdesac Lake
- Cumberland Lake
- Cypress Lake

== D ==
- Davey Lake
- Davin Lake
- Davy Lake
- Delaronde Lake
- Dellwood Reservoir
- Deschambault Lake
- Lake Diefenbaker
- Dipper Lake
- Doré Lake
- Duck Lake

== E ==
- East Trout Lake
- Eastend Reservoir
- Echo Lake
- Egg Lake
- Elaine Lake
- Elbow Lake
- Emerald Lake
- Emma Lake
- Ena lake
- Etomami Lake
- Eyebrow Lake

== F ==
- Fife Lake
- First Mustus Lake
- Fishing Lake
- Fishing Lakes
- Flotten Lake
- Foam Lake
- Forbes Lake
- Fowler Lake
- Fredette Lake
- Frobisher Lake

== G ==
- Gem Lakes
- Good Spirit Lake
- Gooseberry Lake
- Gordon Lake
- Gouverneur Reservoir
- Gow Lake
- Granite Lake
- Grant Devine Reservoir
- Green Lake
- Greenwater Lake
- Greig Lake

== H ==
- Hanson Lake
- Hatchet Lake
- Helene Lake
- Heritage Lake
- Highrock Lake
- Hines Lake
- Hirtz Lake
- Hoidas Lake

== I ==
- Lac Île-à-la-Crosse
- Lac des Îles
- Indi Lake
- Iroquois Lake
- Isbister Lake
- Iskwatikan Lake
- Island Lake
- Ispuchaw Lake

== J ==
- Jackfish Lake
- Jan Lake
- Jayjay Lake
- Jeannette Lake
- Johnston Lake
- Jumbo Lake
- Jumping Lake

== K ==
- Kakinagimak Lake
- Katepwa Lake
- Kazan Lake
- Keeley Lake
- Kenosee Lake
- kikiskitotawânawak iskwêwak Lakes
- Kimball Lake
- Kingsmere Lake
- Kipabiskau Lake
- Kipahigan Lake
- Kisseynew Lake

== L ==
- Lake of the Rivers
- Lady Lake
- Last Mountain Lake
- Lavallée Lake
- Lenore Lake
- Lepine Lake
- Loch Leven
- Limestone Lake
- Little Amyot Lake
- Little Bear Lake
- Little Fishing Lake
- Little Kenosee Lake
- Little Loon Lake
- Little Manitou Lake
- Little Raspberry Lake
- Lac La Loche
- Loon Lake
- Lost Echo Lake
- Lovering Lakes
- Lower Fishing Lake
- Lower Foster Lake
- Lucien Lake
- Luck Lake

== M ==
- Madge Lake
- Makwa Lake
- Manitou Lake
- Marean Lake
- Martin Lake
- Matheson Lake
- McArthur Lake
- McBride Lake
- McDonald Lake
- McIntosh Lake
- McLaren Lake
- McPhee Lake
- Meadow Lake
- Meeting Lake
- Melville Reservoir
- Meridian Lake
- Middle Foster Lake
- Midnight Lake
- Melfort PFRA Reservoir
- Milton Lake
- Ministikwan Lake
- Mirond Lake
- Mission Lake
- Mistohay Lake
- Montreal Lake
- Moose Mountain Lake
- Moosomin Lake
- Moosonees Lake
- Morin Lake
- Mud Lake
- Murray Lake
- Mustus Lakes

== N ==
- Namekus Lake
- Namew Lake
- Nemei Lake
- Nemeiben Lake
- Ness Lakes
- Nesset Lake
- Nesslin Lake
- Newburn Lake
- Newnham Lake
- Nickle Lake
- Nipekamew Lake
- Nipew Lake
- Nistowiak Lake
- Nut Lake

== O ==
- Old Wives Lake
- Opuntia Lake
- Otter Lake

== P ==
- Pagan Lake
- Parr Hill Lake
- Pasqua Lake
- Patience Lake
- Lac la Pêche
- Peck Lake
- Peitahigan Lake
- Pelican Lake
- Lac Pelletier
- Penner Lake
- Pepaw Lake
- Perch Lake
- Perching Lake
- Peter Pond Lake
- Phelan Lake
- Pierce Lake
- Pike Lake
- Pinehouse Lake
- Pipestone Lake
- Piprell Lake
- Pirie Lake
- Lac la Plonge
- Ponass Lakes
- Porter Lake
- Preston Lake
- Primeau Lake
- Primrose Lake
- Pritchard Lake

== Q ==
- Quill Lakes

== R ==
- Radisson Lake
- Redberry Lake
- Reed Lake
- Reid Lake
- Reindeer Lake
- Rice Lake
- Riou Lake
- Lac la Ronge
- Roderick Lake
- Round Lake (Qu'Appelle River)
- Round Lake (RM of Kelvington)
- Rusty Lake

== S ==
- Saginas Lake
- Salt Lake
- Scentgrass Lake
- Scott Lake
- Scott Reservoir
- Selwyn Lake
- Shagwenaw Lake
- Shell Lake
- Shellmouth Reservoir
- Shirley Lake
- Sisipuk Lake
- Sled Lake
- Smallfish Lake
- Smoothstone Lake
- Sokatisewin Lake
- Spirit Lake
- Steepbank Lake
- Struthers Lake
- Sturgeon Lake
- Suggi Lake
- Summit Lake

== T ==
- Taylor Lake
- Tazin Lake
- Theodore Reservoir
- Thomson Lake
- Thorvaldson Lake
- Tobin Lake
- Townsend Lake
- Tramping Lake
- Trout Lake
- Tulibee Lake
- Turnor Lake
- Turtle Lake
- Turvey Lake
- Twelve Mile Lake

== U ==
- Upper Fishing Lake
- Upper Foster Lake

== V ==
- Versailles Lake
- Vivian Lake
- Vollman Lake

== W ==
- Wakaw Lake
- Waldsea Lake
- Wapawekka Lake
- Wasawakasik Lake
- Wasekamio Lake
- Waskesiu Lake
- Waskwei Lake
- Waterbury Lake
- Waterhen Lake
- Weyakwin Lake
- White Bear (Carlyle) Lake
- Whiteshore Lake
- Whiteswan Lakes
- Wildnest Lake
- Willow Bunch Lake
- Witchekan Lake
- Wollaston Lake
- Woody Lake

== Y ==
- York Lake

== Z ==
- Zeden Lake
- Zelma Reservoir

== See also ==
- List of lakes of Canada
- List of rivers of Saskatchewan
- Geography of Saskatchewan
- List of dams and reservoirs in Canada
