= Neuanlage, Saskatchewan =

Hamlet in Saskatchewan, Canada

Coordinates: 52°27′23″N 106°27′50″W

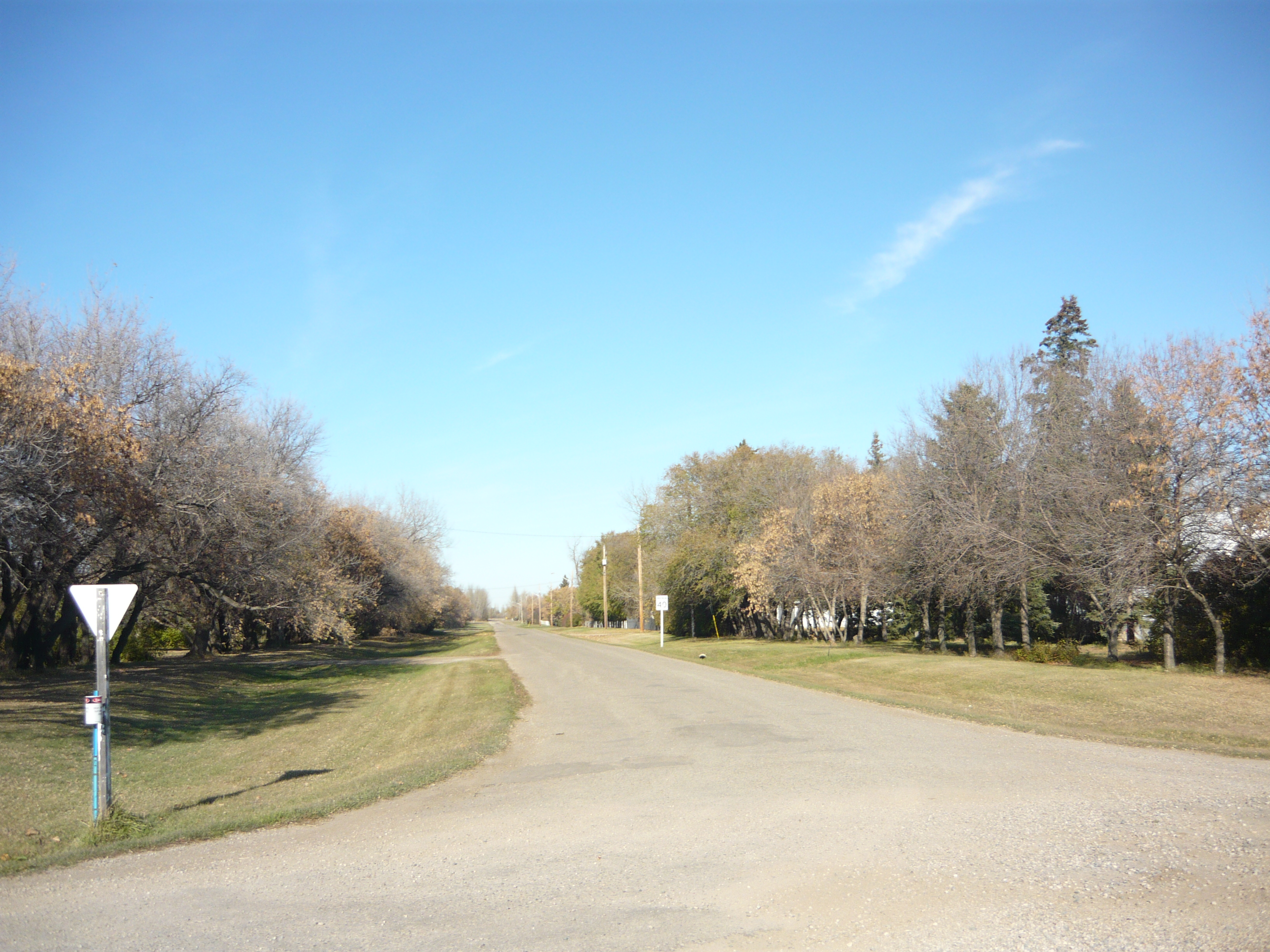
Main Street

Neuanlage is a hamlet in the Province of Saskatchewan, Canada.

== Demographics ==
In the 2021 Census of Population conducted by Statistics Canada, Neuanlage had a population of 571 living in 174 of its 178 total private dwellings, a change of 9.4% from its 2016 population of 522. With a land area of 1.99 km^{2} (0.77 sq mi), it had a population density of 286.9/km^{2} (743.2/sq mi) in 2021.

== 2025 downburst and tornado ==
A significant downburst that occurred on 20 August 2025 at 8:35 PM CST (2:35 UTC) caused significant damage to the town, uplifting trees, taking down powerlines, tearing off chunks of roofs, and wiping a single-car garage clean off of its slab, leaving a boat and some debris around. This storm hit the localities of Gruenthal, Blumenthal, and Neuanlage. This significant storm caused a downburst, gustnado, and a tornado that hit Buffer Lake.

== See also ==
- List of communities in Saskatchewan
