= Gordon Lake (Saskatchewan) =

Lake in Saskatchewan, Canada

- Location in Saskatchewan Gordon Lake (Canada)
- Location: Northern Administration District, Saskatchewan
- Coordinates: 55.8334°N 106.4672°W
- Etymology: Cyril James Albert Gordon
- Part of: Churchill River drainage basin
- River sources: Canadian Shield
- Basin countries: Canada
- Surface area: 2,858 ha (7,060 acres)
- Shore length^{1}: 44 km (27 mi)
- Surface elevation: 684 m (2,244 ft)
- Settlements: None
- ^{1} Shore length is not a well-defined measure.

Gordon Lake is a lake in the Canadian province of Saskatchewan within the Churchill River watershed of the Churchill River Upland ecozone. Gordon Lake was named after Leading Seaman Cyril James Albert Gordon, who was killed in action during the Second World War. He died on 20 September 1943 while on convoy duty south of Iceland when the ship he was aboard, HMCS St. Croix, was torpedoed by U-boats. The lake is about 30 kilometres (19 mi) north of the village of Pinehouse in the Northern Saskatchewan Administration District.

At the southern end of the lake is the Gordon Lake Recreation Site (55.7814°N 106.5456°W). The recreation site has a small campground, picnic area, boat launch, and fish cleaning station. Access is from Highway 914.

== Fish species ==
Fish commonly found in Gordon Lake include burbot, lake trout, lake whitefish, northern pike, and walleye.

== See also ==
- List of lakes of Saskatchewan
