= Davy Lake =

Lake in Saskatchewan, Canada

- Location in Saskatchewan Davy Lake (Canada)
- Location: Northern Administration District, Saskatchewan
- Coordinates: 58°51′N 108°17′W
- Part of: Mackenzie River drainage basin
- Primary inflows: MacFarlane River
- River sources: Canadian Shield
- Primary outflows: MacFarlane River
- Basin countries: Canada
- Surface area: 11,102 ha (27,430 acres)
- Shore length^{1}: 93 km (58 mi)
- Surface elevation: 348 m (1,142 ft)
- Settlements: None
- ^{1} Shore length is not a well-defined measure.

Davy Lake is a large lake in the Canadian province of Saskatchewan. The lake is along the course of the MacFarlane River, which flows into Lake Athabasca and is part of the Mackenzie River drainage basin. Davy Lake is named after Warrant Officer 1 Henry Davy who had died on 24 June 1944 during World War II.

== Origin of name ==
Davy Lake was named after Warrant Officer 1 Henry William (Bill) Davy Jr. DFC of Prince Albert, Saskatchewan as part of the Saskatchewan government's geo-memorial naming program of the 1950s and 1960s. He flew with No. 156 Squadron RAF as a navigator during the Second World War. His Avro Lancaster III JB230 was shot down on 24 June 1944, just east of Lille during a night raid on the flying bomb works at Coubronnes. His grave is located at a Zuytpeene churchyard near Cassel, Nord, France.

== Fish species ==
Fish commonly found in Davy Lake include lake whitefish, lake trout, and northern pike.

== See also ==
- List of lakes of Saskatchewan
