= Preston Lake (Saskatchewan) =

Lake in Saskatchewan, Canada

- Location in Saskatchewan Preston Lake (Canada)
- Location: Northern Administration District, Saskatchewan
- Coordinates: 57.4178°N 109.1495°W
- Part of: Mackenzie River drainage basin
- Basin countries: Canada
- Surface area: 2,568 ha (6,350 acres)
- Max. depth: 20.8 m (68 ft)
- Shore length^{1}: 22.6 km (14.0 mi)
- Surface elevation: 473 m (1,552 ft)
- Settlements: None
- ^{1} Shore length is not a well-defined measure.

Preston Lake is a lake in the north-western part of the Canadian province of Saskatchewan. The lake is surrounded by boreal forest and muskeg and fed by several small rivers while the outflow is a short river that drains south into Lloyd Lake. Lloyd Lake is along the course of the Clearwater River. Access to Preston Lake is from Highway 955.

Preston Lake Wildlife Refuge (57.4049°N 109.1833°W) is a 4-hectare (9.9-acre) provincial wildlife refuge on a small island near the western shore of the lake.

== Fish species ==
Fish commonly found in Preston Lake include trout, lake whitefish, longnose sucker, northern pike, walleye, white sucker, and yellow perch.

== See also ==
- List of lakes of Saskatchewan
