= Ena Lake (Saskatchewan) =

Lake in Saskatchewan, Canada

- Location in Saskatchewan Ena Lake (Canada)
- Location: Northern Administration District, Saskatchewan
- Coordinates: 59°55′N 108°12′W
- Part of: Mackenzie River drainage basin
- Primary inflows: Ena River
- River sources: Canadian Shield
- Primary outflows: Ena River
- Basin countries: Canada
- Surface area: 3,453 ha (8,530 acres)
- Shore length^{1}: 143 km (89 mi)
- Surface elevation: 414 m (1,358 ft)
- Islands: Gillis Island; Scott Island
- Settlements: None
- ^{1} Shore length is not a well-defined measure.

Ena Lake is a lake in the Canadian province of Saskatchewan, near the boundary with the Northwest Territories. It is within Saskatchewan's Northern Administration District. The lake has several islands, the largest of which is Gillis Island. On the lake is a fly-in fishing lodge called Ena Lake Lodge Fishing Club.

== Description ==
Ena Lake is situated in the Canadian Shield and the Mackenzie River drainage basin. Its main inflow and outflow is the Ena River. The Ena River begins in the Northwest Territories and flows south into the north end of Ena Lake. It leaves the lake at the western shore and flows west into Soulier Lake and then Tazin Lake.

Scott Island in the lake was named after Richard Alston Scott as part of the GeoMemorial Commemorative Naming Program. The GeoMemorial Commemorative Naming Program is a program that names geographical features in honour of those who lost their lives in the service of Canada. Richard Scott enlisted in 1942 and died by accidental death on 2 May 1943 in Ladysmith, British Columbia.

== Fish species ==
Fish commonly found in Ena Lake include northern pike, lake trout, lake whitefish, and round whitefish.

== See also ==
- List of lakes of Saskatchewan
- Tourism in Saskatchewan
