= Milton Lake =

Milton Lake may refer to:

== Canada ==
- Milton Lake (Parry Sound District), Ontario
- Milton Lake (Thunder Bay District), Ontario
- Milton Lake (Sudbury District), Ontario
- Milton Lake (Saskatchewan)

== United Kingdom ==
- Milton Lake, an area of Langstone Harbour in Hampshire, England

== United States ==
- Lake Milton, Ohio
- Milton Pond, New Hampshire
