= Moosonees Lake =

Lake in Saskatchewan, Canada

- Location in Saskatchewan Moosonees Lake (Canada)
- Location: Northern Administration District, Saskatchewan
- Coordinates: 59°02′01″N 104°08′02″W
- Part of: Mackenzie River drainage basin
- River sources: Canadian Shield
- Basin countries: Canada
- Max. length: 5.9 km (3.7 mi)
- Max. width: 3.5 km (2.2 mi)
- Surface area: 824 ha (2,040 acres)
- Shore length^{1}: 27 km (17 mi)
- Surface elevation: 353 m (1,158 ft)
- Settlements: None
- ^{1} Shore length is not a well-defined measure.

Moosonees Lake is a remote lake in north-eastern part of the Canadian province of Saskatchewan, about 3 kilometres (1.9 mi) north of the Fond du Lac River. A 17-kilometre (11 mi) long stream flows out of the lake in the northwest connecting it with the latter.

Moosonees Lake's surface is 353 metres (1,158 ft) above sea level and has an area of 824 hectares (2,040 acres). It extends 3.5 kilometres (2.2 mi) in the north–south direction, and 5.9 kilometres (3.7 mi) in the east–west direction.

The surrounding area of Moosonees Lake is part of the subarctic climate zone. The vegetation around the lake consists of mainly sparse and often low-growth subarctic woods.

== See also ==
- List of lakes of Saskatchewan
