= Beaverlodge Lake =

Lake in Saskatchewan, Canada

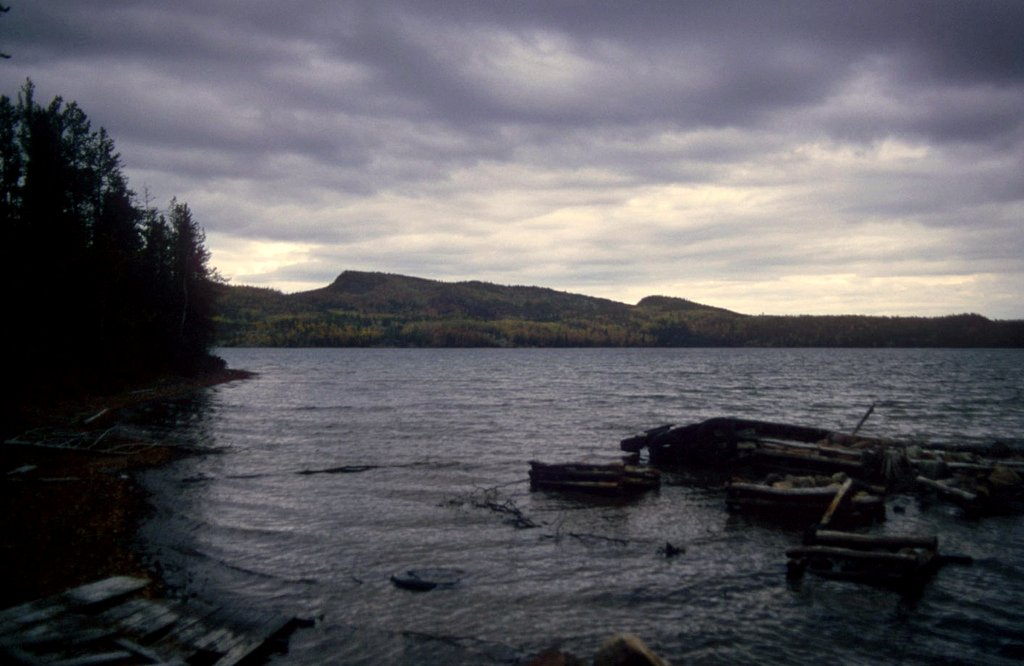
- Beaverlodge Lake

- Location in Saskatchewan Beaverlodge Lake (Canada)
- Location: Northern Administration District, Saskatchewan
- Coordinates: 59°30′N 108°34′W
- Part of: Mackenzie River drainage basin
- Primary inflows: Gillies Channel
- River sources: Canadian Shield
- Basin countries: Canada
- Surface area: 4,970.2 ha (12,282 acres)
- Max. depth: 65.53 m (215.0 ft)
- Shore length^{1}: 101.4 km (63.0 mi)
- Surface elevation: 265 m (869 ft)
- Islands: Lenz Island; Umisk Island; Hofer Island; Todd Island; Pratt Island
- Settlements: Eldorado
- ^{1} Shore length is not a well-defined measure.

Beaverlodge Lake is a remote lake in northern Saskatchewan, Canada, located south of Uranium City and north of Lake Athabasca. Road access is provided by Highway 962.

The former Eldorado town site is on the lake and there has been extensive uranium exploration in the surrounding area.

== See also ==
- List of lakes of Saskatchewan
