= Bolton Lake (Saskatchewan) =

Lake in Saskatchewan, Canada

- Location in Saskatchewan Bolton Lake (Canada)
- Location: Northern Administration District, Saskatchewan
- Coordinates: 57°34′00″N 108°41′02″W
- Part of: Mackenzie River drainage basin
- Primary outflows: Unnamed creek to Meanwell Lake
- Basin countries: Canada
- Max. length: 2.7 km (1.7 mi)
- Max. width: 1.3 km (0.81 mi)
- Surface elevation: 487 m (1,598 ft)

Bolton Lake is a lake in the Mackenzie River drainage basin in north-western Saskatchewan, Canada. It is about 2.7 kilometres (1.7 mi) long and 1.3 kilometres (0.81 mi) wide, and lies at an elevation of 487 metres (1,598 ft). The primary outflow is an unnamed creek to Meanwell Lake, then an unnamed creek into the Mirror River, and then via Clearwater River, Athabasca River, Slave River, and Mackenzie River into the Arctic Ocean.

Access to the lake is either by air or a winter road. The Bolton Lake Airstrip is just north-west of the lake. It has a 3,000-foot grass runway and a helipad.

On the northern shore of the lake is the Bolton Lake Wilderness Retreat. It has a lodge, cabins, and a commercial kitchen. Outdoors, there is black bear hunting, ATV trails, and hiking trails.

== See also ==
- List of lakes of Saskatchewan
- Tourism in Saskatchewan
