= Struthers Lake =

Lake in Saskatchewan, Canada

- Location in Saskatchewan Struthers Lake (Canada)
- Location: Invergordon No. 430, Saskatchewan
- Coordinates: 52.8505°N 105.2411°W
- Part of: Saskatchewan River drainage basin
- Primary inflows: Carrot River
- Primary outflows: Carrot River
- Basin countries: Canada
- Surface area: 103.5 ha (256 acres)
- Max. depth: 8 m (26 ft)
- Shore length^{1}: 4.4 km (2.7 mi)
- Surface elevation: 462 m (1,516 ft)
- ^{1} Shore length is not a well-defined measure.

Struthers Lake is a small lake along the course of the Carrot River in the aspen parkland ecoregion of the Canadian province of Saskatchewan. It is about 28 kilometres (17 mi) south-west of Kinistino. There is a small regional park on the southern shore and access to the lake and its facilities is from Highway 778.

== Struthers Lake Regional Park ==
Struthers Lake Regional Park (52.8449°N 105.2324°W) is situated on the southern shore of Struthers Lake. The park, which was founded in 1965, has a campground, cabin rentals, boat launch, water slide and splash park, hiking trails, and a sandy beach. The campground has 66 campsites and there are seven rentable cabins.

== Fish species ==
Fish commonly found in Struthers Lake include northern pike and walleye.

== See also ==
- List of lakes of Saskatchewan
- Tourism in Saskatchewan
