= Umisk Island =

Island in Saskatchewan, Canada

- Location within Saskatchewan

Geography
- Location: Saskatchewan
- Coordinates: 59°31′50″N 108°28′50″W

Administration
- Canada
- Province: Saskatchewan

Umisk Island is a small island in Beaverlodge Lake, Northern Saskatchewan, Canada. The island has a public picnic area.

The west shore of the island was the site of exploratory uranium mining. The site was originally staked and surveyed by Eldorado Mining and Refining between 1946 and 1947 (referred to as BEAVER Claim No. 4). In 1953 the claim was purchased by Meta Uranium Mines Ltd and in 1954 a prospect shaft to a depth of 115 metres (377 ft) was constructed. Mining operations were suspended in November 1955, however remnants of the mine site still remain on the island.

In the spring of 1994, the Greater Lenora Resource Corporation staked a new claim on the island.

== See also ==
- List of islands of Saskatchewan
