= Versailles Lake =

Lake in Saskatchewan, Canada

- Location of Versailles Lake in Saskatchewan Versailles Lake (Canada)
- Location: Northern Administration District, Saskatchewan
- Coordinates: 55.8218°N 104.3417°W
- Etymology: Treaty of Versailles
- Part of: Churchill River drainage basin
- Basin countries: Canada
- Surface area: 1,027.5 ha (2,539 acres)
- Max. depth: 55 m (180 ft)
- Shore length^{1}: 67 km (42 mi)
- Surface elevation: 404 m (1,325 ft)
- ^{1} Shore length is not a well-defined measure.

Versailles Lake is one of a maze of lakes in north-western Saskatchewan. It is bordered by many lakes, including Minuhik Lake. It has several deep holes. The deepest recorded depth is 55 metres (180 ft).

Versailles Lake is named after the Treaty of Versailles which ended the First World War.

== Climate and weather ==
The climate is the same as most of Northern Saskatchewan. It has hot days in the summer and cold in the winter. Mild to severe thunderstorms happen every few days.

== Fishing ==
There is an abundance of northern pike, lake trout, and several species of bottom feeders.

== See also ==
- List of lakes of Saskatchewan
