= Jeffrey City, Wyoming =

- Census-designated place
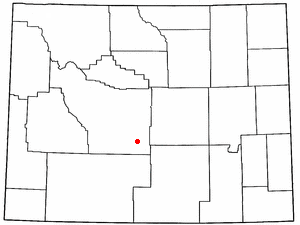
- Location of Jeffrey City, Wyoming
- Coordinates: 42°29′36″N 107°49′42″W
- Country: United States
- State: Wyoming
- County: Fremont

Area
  - Total: 28.5 sq mi (73.8 km^{2})
  - Land: 28.3 sq mi (73.4 km^{2})
  - Water: 0.15 sq mi (0.4 km^{2})
- Elevation: 6,335 ft (1,931 m)

Population (2010)
  - Total: 58
  - Density: 2.0/sq mi (0.79/km^{2})
- Time zone: UTC−7 (Mountain (MST))
  - Summer (DST): UTC−6 (MDT)
- ZIP code: 82310
- Area code: 307
- FIPS code: 56-40555
- GNIS feature ID: 2408442

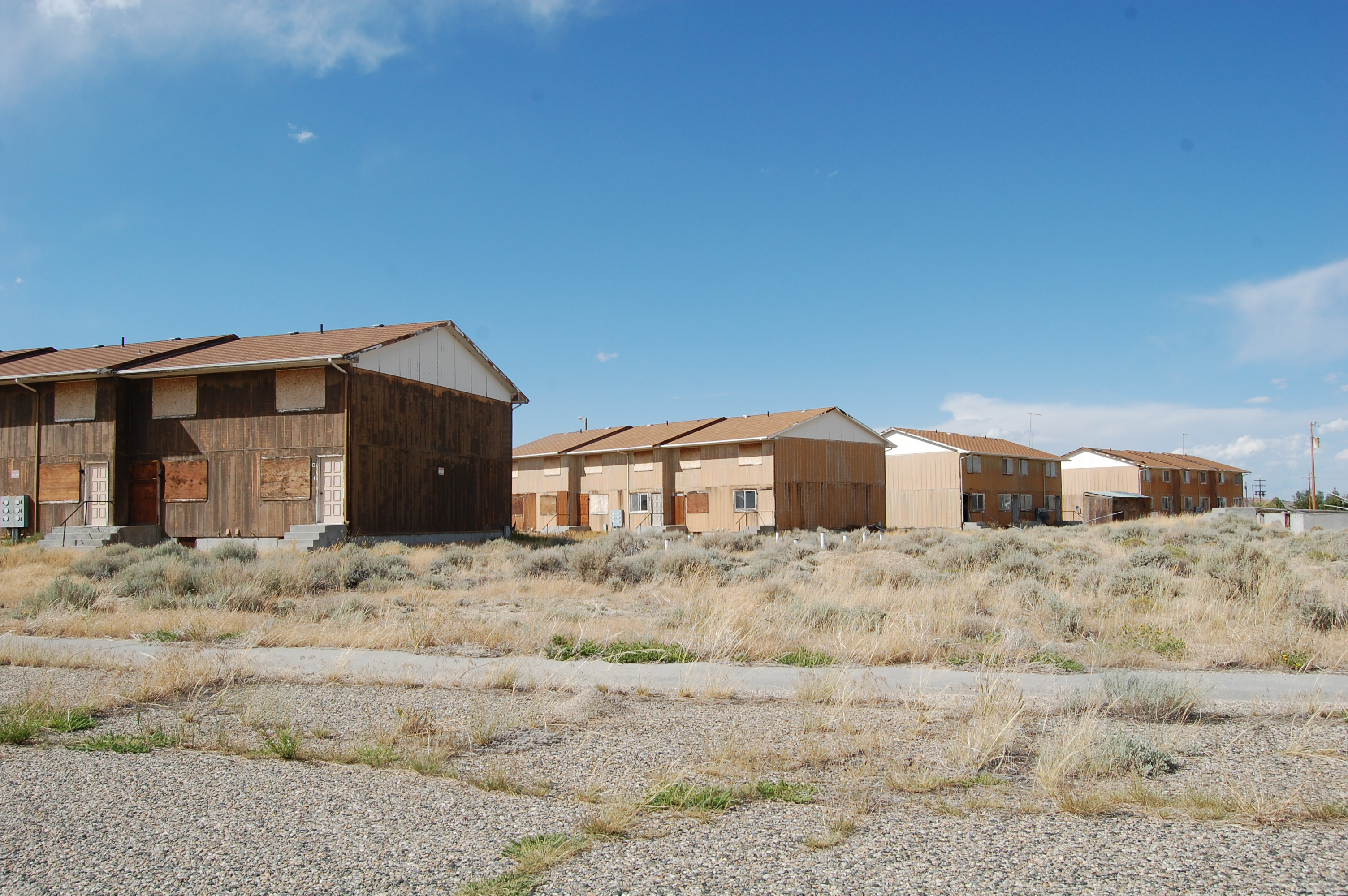
Boarded-up abandoned housing in Jeffrey City, Wyoming, former uranium boomtown

Jeffrey City is a former uranium mining boomtown located in Fremont County, in the central part of the U.S. state of Wyoming. The town is known in Wyoming and the American West as symbol of a boomtown that went "bust" very quickly, as the mine was shut down in 1982 and over 95% of the inhabitants left the town within three years. The population was 58 at the 2010 census, far lower than its onetime population of several thousand people. For statistical purposes, the United States Census Bureau has defined Jeffrey City as a census-designated place (CDP).

== History ==
Jeffrey City began in 1931 as "Home on the Range", the 640-acre (2.6 km^{2}) homestead of a Nebraska couple named the Petersons, who relocated because Mr. Peterson was sick after having been gassed in World War I. Mrs. Beulah Peterson (later Walker) opened two gasoline pumps when the highway came through, and began cooking for those who stopped. The post office at Split Rock, 14 miles (23 km) away, closed in 1943, and Mrs. Peterson took up the task of handling the ranchers' mail. She canceled the letters with "Home on the Range". She retired her post office cancellation stamp in 1957 when Home on the Range became Jeffrey City. Her family members are currently restoring the old Home on the Range post office site.

Home on the Range became Jeffrey City when those who came to mine uranium sought to honor C. W. Jeffrey, a wealthy doctor from Rawlins, Wyoming, who initially financed the costs for prospector and businessman Bob Adams to start the Western Nuclear Corporation mining firm and open a uranium mine near the area in 1957, during the Cold War and the height of uranium demand.

Thousands of people looking for high-paying mining jobs streamed into Jeffrey City, and Western Nuclear designed and financed a company town for the workers and their families. At the height of the boom town optimism, a separate high school building was added and an Olympic-sized swimming pool and third gymnasium was built. In the late 1970s and early 1980s, the uranium market collapsed and the mine was forced to close. As was typical of many boom towns, Jeffrey City was singularly dependent on the local mine, and after it closed there was no reason for residents to remain. What was once a thriving local community with shops, schools, library, sheriff, youth hostel, churches, medical clinics and more, became a ghost town as 95% of the residents left the town by 1986. Today, few institutions remain: the First (Southern) Baptist Church (which is still doing well thanks to the area ranchers who attend), a restaurant and bar called the Split Rock Café that caters to the few local residents and those passing through on the highway, and Monk King Bird Pottery, a pottery studio. The Green Mountain Motel provides perhaps the only lodging along the 122-mile (196 km) route between Rawlins and Riverton.

== Geography and climate ==
Jeffrey City is located in southeastern Fremont County along U.S. Route 287, 67 miles (108 km) northwest of Rawlins and Interstate 80, and 58 miles (93 km) southeast of Lander, the Fremont County seat. According to the United States Census Bureau, the Jeffrey City CDP has a total area of 28.5 square miles (73.8 km^{2}), of which 28.3 square miles (73.4 km^{2}) is land and 0.2 square miles (0.4 km^{2}), or 0.56%, is water. The community is in the valley of the Sweetwater River, an east-flowing tributary of the North Platte River.

Climate data for Jeffrey City, Wyoming, 1991–2020 normals, extremes 1964–present: 6319ft (1926m)
Month	Jan	Feb	Mar	Apr	May	Jun	Jul	Aug	Sep	Oct	Nov	Dec	Year
Record high °F (°C)	57 (14)	60 (16)	78 (26)	80 (27)	92 (33)	99 (37)	98 (37)	97 (36)	94 (34)	87 (31)	69 (21)	62 (17)	99 (37)
Mean maximum °F (°C)	44.4 (6.9)	48.7 (9.3)	62.2 (16.8)	73.3 (22.9)	80.8 (27.1)	88.9 (31.6)	93.9 (34.4)	91.8 (33.2)	87.0 (30.6)	75.8 (24.3)	60.5 (15.8)	47.0 (8.3)	94.3 (34.6)
Mean daily maximum °F (°C)	31.0 (−0.6)	33.8 (1.0)	44.5 (6.9)	54.0 (12.2)	64.2 (17.9)	76.4 (24.7)	85.2 (29.6)	83.4 (28.6)	72.9 (22.7)	57.9 (14.4)	42.3 (5.7)	31.0 (−0.6)	56.4 (13.5)
Daily mean °F (°C)	20.0 (−6.7)	22.3 (−5.4)	32.1 (0.1)	40.2 (4.6)	49.6 (9.8)	59.8 (15.4)	67.6 (19.8)	65.8 (18.8)	56.0 (13.3)	43.3 (6.3)	30.1 (−1.1)	20.3 (−6.5)	42.3 (5.7)
Mean daily minimum °F (°C)	9.0 (−12.8)	10.9 (−11.7)	19.8 (−6.8)	26.3 (−3.2)	35.0 (1.7)	43.2 (6.2)	50.0 (10.0)	48.3 (9.1)	39.1 (3.9)	28.7 (−1.8)	17.9 (−7.8)	9.5 (−12.5)	28.1 (−2.1)
Mean minimum °F (°C)	−18.6 (−28.1)	−15.3 (−26.3)	−2.4 (−19.1)	10.6 (−11.9)	21.0 (−6.1)	32.2 (0.1)	40.3 (4.6)	37.0 (2.8)	25.4 (−3.7)	9.3 (−12.6)	−7.5 (−21.9)	−17.2 (−27.3)	−26.4 (−32.4)
Record low °F (°C)	−49 (−45)	−39 (−39)	−33 (−36)	−18 (−28)	11 (−12)	27 (−3)	32 (0)	28 (−2)	1 (−17)	−27 (−33)	−31 (−35)	−46 (−43)	−49 (−45)
Average precipitation inches (mm)	0.35 (8.9)	0.50 (13)	0.79 (20)	1.40 (36)	1.97 (50)	0.97 (25)	0.66 (17)	0.54 (14)	0.82 (21)	0.91 (23)	0.51 (13)	0.46 (12)	9.88 (252.9)
Average snowfall inches (cm)	5.0 (13)	7.0 (18)	8.8 (22)	12.1 (31)	5.6 (14)	0.4 (1.0)	0.0 (0.0)	0.0 (0.0)	1.3 (3.3)	7.4 (19)	6.3 (16)	6.3 (16)	60.2 (153.3)
Average extreme snow depth inches (cm)	3.9 (9.9)	5.3 (13)	5.5 (14)	4.4 (11)	1.8 (4.6)	0.1 (0.25)	0.0 (0.0)	0.0 (0.0)	0.6 (1.5)	3.8 (9.7)	4.1 (10)	3.6 (9.1)	9.4 (24)
Average precipitation days (≥ 0.01 in)	2.8	3.8	4.4	6.9	8.7	5.2	4.2	4.0	4.9	4.8	3.1	3.1	55.9
Average snowy days (≥ 0.1 in)	2.7	3.8	3.5	4.2	1.6	0.1	0.0	0.0	0.4	2.3	2.7	3.0	24.3
Source 1: NOAA
Source 2: XMACIS2 (records & monthly max/mins)

== Demographics ==
As of the census of 2000, there were 106 people, 45 households, and 32 families residing in the CDP. The population density was 3.7 inhabitants per square mile (1.4/km^{2}). There were 112 housing units at an average density of 3.9 per square mile (1.5/km^{2}). The racial makeup of the CDP was 98.11% White or 104 people, 0.94% or one Native American, and 0.94% or one person from two or more races. Hispanic or Latino of any race were 1.89% of the population, or two people.

There were 45 households, out of which 15.6% had children under the age of 18 living with them, 66.7% were married couples living together, 2.2% or one household had a female householder with no husband present, and 26.7% were non-families. 17.8% of all households were made up of individuals, and 4.4% had someone living alone who was 65 years of age or older. The average household size was 2.36 and the average family size was 2.61.

In the CDP, the population was spread out, with 14.2% under the age of 18, 8.5% from 18 to 24, 26.4% from 25 to 44, 41.5% from 45 to 64, and 9.4% who were 65 years of age or older. The median age was 46 years. For every 100 females, there were 152.4 males. For every 100 females age 18 and over, there were 127.5 males.

The median income for a household in the CDP was $42,857, and the median income for a family was $42,679. Males had a median income of $65,156 versus $23,750 for females. The per capita income for the CDP was $20,061. There were no families and 8.2% of the population living below the poverty line, including no under eighteens and none of those over 64.

== Education ==
Public education in the community of Jeffrey City is provided by Fremont County School District #1. In 2013 the school served kindergarten through 4th grade, and had two students. Prior to 1997 Jeffrey City had its own school district.

== See also ==
- Uranium City, Saskatchewan
- Yellowcake boomtown
