= Saskatchewan Highway 962 =

Provincial highway in Saskatchewan, Canada

Highway 962

Route information
- Maintained by Ministry of Highways and Infrastructure
- Length: 19.22 km (11.94 mi)

Major junctions
- South end: Dead end at Bushell Inlet in Bushell
- North end: End of maintenance in Eldorado

Location
- Country: Canada
- Province: Saskatchewan

Highway system
- Provincial highways in Saskatchewan
← Highway 956	→ Highway 963

Highway 962 is an isolated provincial highway in the far north part of the Canadian province of Saskatchewan. For part of the year the highway is not connected to any other highway in the province, but during the winter months a winter road forms across Lake Athabasca, connecting to Highway 962 and allowing access to Fond-du-Lac and other communities to the east. It is about 40 kilometres (25 mi) long.

Highway 962 starts where the Uranium City Winter Road ends at Lake Athabasca, about 456 kilometres (283 mi) from the nearest major settlement, Fort McMurray, Alberta. It then passes through the communities of Uranium City and Eldorado before terminating at a dead end near Beaverlodge Lake.

== Major intersections ==
Rural municipality	Location	km	mi	Destinations	Notes
Northern Saskatchewan	Bushell	0.00	0.00	Dead end	Southern terminus; dead end at Bushell Inlet
Northern Saskatchewan	Eldorado	19.22	11.94	End of maintenance	Northern terminus; connection available to winter road
1.000 mi = 1.609 km; 1.000 km = 0.621 mi

== See also ==
- Roads in Saskatchewan
- Transportation in Saskatchewan
