= Rice Lake (Saskatchewan) =

Lake in Saskatchewan, Canada

- Location in Saskatchewan Rice Lake (Canada)
- Location: RM of Vanscoy No. 345, Saskatchewan
- Coordinates: 52.0647°N 107.1113°W
- Type: Endorheic
- Part of: Saskatchewan River drainage basin
- Primary outflows: None
- Basin countries: Canada
- Surface elevation: 510 m (1,670 ft)

Rice Lake is a lake in the Canadian province of Saskatchewan. The lake is in the Moist Mixed Grassland ecoregion in the Rural Municipality of Vanscoy No. 345, about 30 kilometres (19 mi) west of Saskatoon. There are no communities along the lake's shore and the nearest highway is Highway 672.

== Description ==
Rice Lake is a shallow, semi-permanent fresh water marsh that is an important wetland for birds. Water levels are mostly dependent upon spring runoff and seasonal rains. The primary inflow for Rice Lake is from a creek that originates at Goose Lake and flows into the south-west end. To help regulate water levels, Ducks Unlimited built a dyke across the southern end of the lake. The lake and surrounding land is part of the Rice Lake (SK 081) Important Bird Area of Canada. The protected area covers 93.99 km^{2} (36.29 sq mi) of land and is an important wetland for the Franklin's gull, eared grebe, green-winged teal, northern pintail, mallard, and the Canada goose.

== See also ==
- List of lakes of Saskatchewan
- List of protected areas of Saskatchewan
