= Salt Lake (Saskatchewan) =

Salt lake in Saskatchewan, Canada

- Location in Saskatchewan Salt Lake (Canada)
- Location: RM of Senlac No. 411, Saskatchewan
- Coordinates: 52.408°N 109.725°W
- Type: Salt lake
- Part of: Saskatchewan River drainage basin
- Basin countries: Canada
- Max. length: 1.32 km (0.82 mi)
- Max. width: 0.98 km (0.61 mi)
- Surface area: 0.75 km^{2} (0.29 sq mi)
- Shore length^{1}: 4.69 km (2.91 mi)
- ^{1} Shore length is not a well-defined measure.

Salt Lake is a lake in the Canadian province of Saskatchewan. The lake is located south of Senlac in the west central part of the province. The lake was the site of the earliest known production of salt in the province, extracted by the Senlac Salt Co. around 1920. The area is currently the site of significant heavy crude oil and natural gas production. There is a small hamlet named after the lake which mostly houses oil field workers.

== See also ==
- List of lakes of Saskatchewan
