= Bulrush Lake (Saskatchewan) =

Lake in Saskatchewan, Canada

- Location in Saskatchewan Bulrush Lake (Canada)
- Location: RM of Last Mountain Valley No. 250, Saskatchewan
- Coordinates: 51.3667704°N 105.4011737°W
- Type: Endorheic lake
- Part of: Red River drainage basin
- Primary outflows: None
- Basin countries: Canada
- Surface area: 312 ha (770 acres)
- Shore length^{1}: 16 km (9.9 mi)
- Settlements: None
- ^{1} Shore length is not a well-defined measure.

Bulrush Lake is a small terminal lake in the central part of the Canadian province of Saskatchewan. The lake is in the Rural Municipality of Last Mountain Valley No. 250, north of the town of Imperial and between Saskatchewan Highway 2 and Last Mountain Lake.

== See also ==
- List of lakes of Saskatchewan
