= Porter Lake (Saskatchewan) =

Lake in Saskatchewan, Canada

- Location in Saskatchewan Porter Lake (Canada)
- Location: RM of Aberdeen No. 373, Saskatchewan
- Coordinates: 52.2001°N 106.2839°W
- Type: Salt lake
- Part of: Saskatchewan River drainage basin
- Primary outflows: None
- Basin countries: Canada
- Surface area: 250.6 ha (619 acres)
- Surface elevation: 508 m (1,667 ft)
- Settlements: None

Porter Lake is a shallow salt lake in the Canadian province of Saskatchewan. It is located in the Rural Municipality of Aberdeen No. 373, about 20 kilometres (12 mi) north-east of Saskatoon. There are no communities along the lake's shore. Access is from Ike Thiessen Road, which connects to Highways 5 and 41. The lake and the surrounding landscape is designated as an Important Bird Area of Canada.

== Description ==
Porter Lake is a salt lake that, during drought years, dries up. The lake water levels depend on spring run off, seasonal rains, and intermittent creeks. It has no outflow as it is endorheic.

A total of 58.39 km^{2} (22.54 sq mi) of the lake and surrounding land is covered by the Porter Lake (SK 077) Important Bird Area (IBA). Extensive mudflats line the lake's shore, which makes an excellent habitat for shore birds, especially the Hudsonian godwit. Other birds found at the lake include the black-crowned night heron, double-crested cormorant, and the bank swallow. The IBA site covers all of Porter Lake and the northern half of Burke Lake. Driving tours of the IBA are available for birdwatchers.

== See also ==
- List of lakes of Saskatchewan
- List of protected areas of Saskatchewan
