= Mud Lake (Saskatchewan) =

There are several lakes named Mud Lake within the Canadian province of Saskatchewan.

- Little Quill Lake, also known as Mud Lake, located north of Wynyard, Saskatchewan. 51°55′00″N 104°12′00″W
- Mud Lake, located southwest of Moosomin, Saskatchewan. 49°46′00″N 102°28′00″W

This lake is located within Moose Mountain Provincial Park.

- Mud Lake, located north of Canora, Saskatchewan, near Sturgis, Saskatchewan. 51°56′00″N 102°31′00″W
- Mud Lake, also located north of Canora, Saskatchewan, near Swan Plain, Saskatchewan. 52°11′00″N 102°15′00″W
