= Davey Lake (Saskatchewan) =

Lake in Saskatchewan, Canada

- Location in Saskatchewan Davey Lake (Canada)
- Location: Northern Administration District, Saskatchewan
- Coordinates: 54°58′N 105°24′W
- Part of: Churchill River drainage basin
- Basin countries: Canada
- Surface area: 41.7 ha (103 acres)
- Shore length^{1}: 2.55 km (1.58 mi)
- Settlements: None
- ^{1} Shore length is not a well-defined measure.

Davey Lake is a small lake in the Canadian province of Saskatchewan in the Churchill River drainage basin. The lake is surrounded by boreal forest and muskeg. It is 18 kilometres (11 mi) south-southwest of the town of La Ronge and directly west of Lac la Ronge in the Northern Saskatchewan Administration District. There is no road access. Its outflow is a small creek that leaves the lake at the northern shore and flows a short distance to Biden Lake. Biden Lake's outflow is a tributary of Highway Creek, which flows into Potato Lake. Potato River flows out of Potato Lake and into Lac la Ronge.

== See also ==
- List of lakes of Saskatchewan
