= Milton Lake (Saskatchewan) =

Lake in Saskatchewan, Canada

- Location in Saskatchewan Milton Lake (Canada)
- Location: Northern Administration District, Saskatchewan
- Coordinates: 59°30′N 103°52′W
- Type: Glacial lake
- Part of: Mackenzie River drainage basin
- River sources: Canadian Shield
- Primary outflows: East Porcupine River
- Basin countries: Canada
- Surface area: 4,367 ha (10,790 acres)
- Shore length^{1}: 94 km (58 mi)
- Surface elevation: 368 m (1,207 ft)
- Settlements: None
- ^{1} Shore length is not a well-defined measure.

Milton Lake is a glacial lake in the Northern Administration District of Saskatchewan, Canada. The lake is about 30 kilometres (19 mi) south of the boundary with the Northwest Territories in the Mackenzie River drainage basin. There are no communities at the lake and no highway access. There are floatplanes that service a fishing lodge.

== Description ==
Milton Lake covers an area of 4,367 hectares (10,790 acres) and has a shoreline measuring 94 kilometres (58 mi) long. The northern end of the lake at Lewis Bay flows into the East Porcupine River. The East Porcupine River flows west into the Porcupine River, which is a tributary of the Fond du Lac River.

Two features of the lake were named in honour of soldiers who died in service of Canada during World War II. At the southern end of the lake is Wright Bay. It was named after David Morley Wright who died on 16 July 1944. Lewis Bay—at the northern end—was named after Stanley Wellington Lewis. He died on 13 December 1944.

A fly-in only fishing lodge is located at the northern end of Milton Lake. Fish commonly found in the lake include northern pike, Arctic grayling, and lake trout.

== See also ==
- List of lakes of Saskatchewan
