= Buffer Lake =

Lake in Saskatchewan, Canada

- Location in Saskatchewan Buffer Lake (Canada)
- Location: RM of Grant No. 372, Saskatchewan
- Coordinates: 52.3834°N 106.0006°W
- Type: Salt lake
- Part of: Saskatchewan River drainage basin
- Primary outflows: None
- Basin countries: Canada
- Surface area: 2,602 ha (6,430 acres)
- Shore length^{1}: 37 km (23 mi)
- Surface elevation: 508 m (1,667 ft)
- Settlements: None
- ^{1} Shore length is not a well-defined measure.

Buffer Lake is large, shallow salt lake in the Canadian province of Saskatchewan. The lake is mostly dependent on spring run-off and seasonal rains to maintain water levels. During periods of drought, extensive mudflats form around the lake. The lake is in the Rural Municipality of Grant No. 372, about 5 kilometres (3.1 mi) north-east of Vonda.

Buffer Lake is encompassed by Buffer Lake (SK 076), an Important Bird Area (IBA) of Canada, that covers an area of 129.72 km^{2} (50.09 sq mi). The IBA is an important habitat for the piping plover and whooping crane. Five gravelly beaches along the western and northern shores have been designated as critical piping plover habitat and as such, the shoreline up to the highwater mark is protected from development. Other birds found at the lake include the red-necked phalarope, Baird's sandpiper, Hudsonian godwit, sanderling, and the buff-breasted sandpiper.

== See also ==
- List of lakes of Saskatchewan
- List of protected areas of Saskatchewan
