= Uranium City =

Community in Saskatchewan, Canada

- Northern settlement
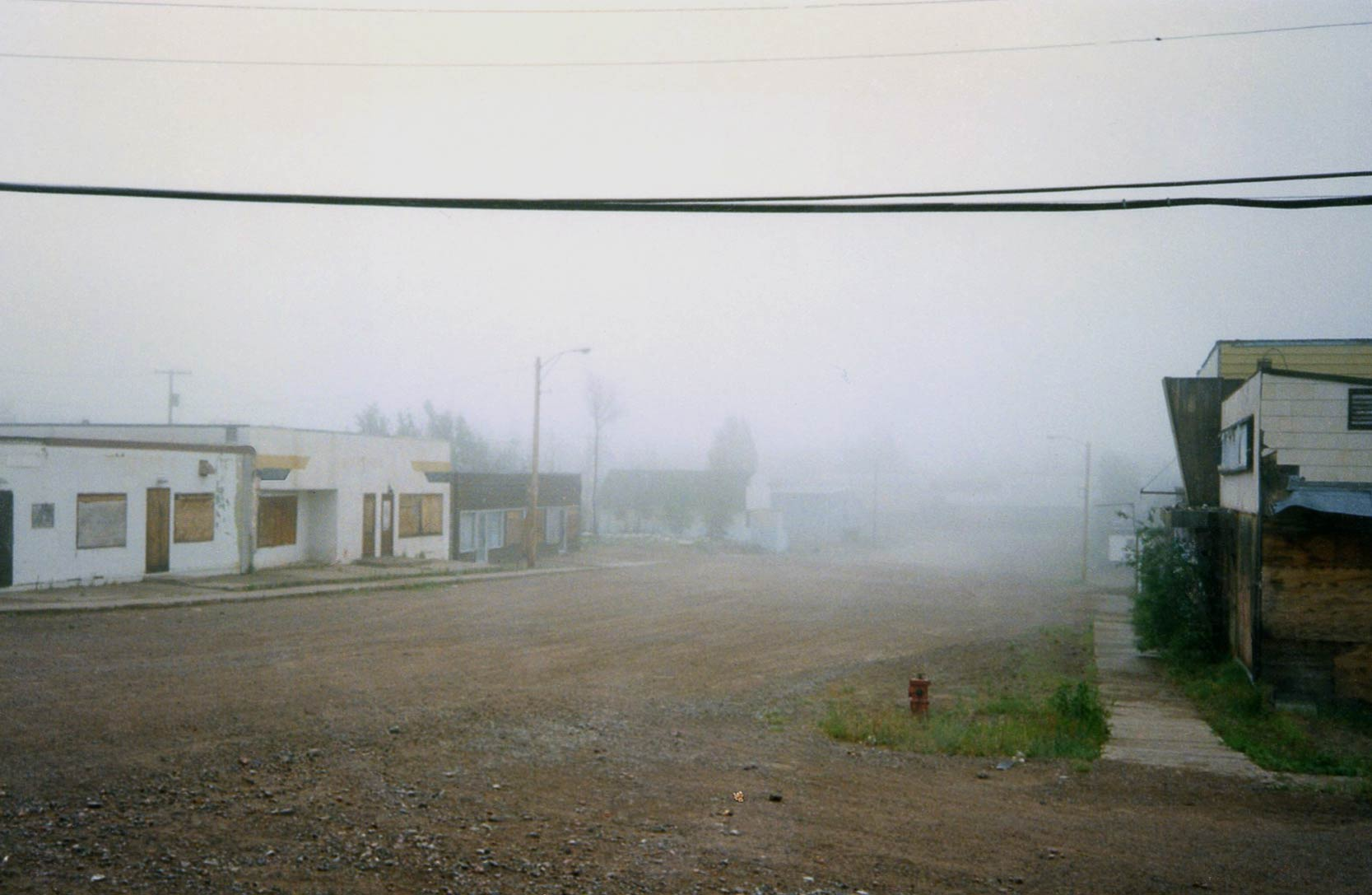
- Main Street on a foggy day

- Location within Saskatchewan Location within Canada
- Coordinates: 59°33′57″N 108°36′52″W
- Country: Canada
- Province: Saskatchewan
- District: Northern Saskatchewan Administration District
- Census division: Division No. 18
- Incorporated: 5 April 1956
- Dissolved: 1 October 1983

Area
  - Total: 6.25 km^{2} (2.41 sq mi)

Population (2021)
  - Total: 91
  - Density: 6.87/km^{2} (17.8/sq mi)
- Time zone: UTC−06:00 (CST)
- Forward sortation area: S0J
- Area code: 306
- NTS Map: 74N10 Uranium City
- GNBC Code: HAISA

Uranium City is a northern settlement in Saskatchewan, Canada. The community is at the mouth of Fredette River on Martin Lake. It is north of Lake Athabasca and Beaverlodge Lake and is about 760 kilometres (470 mi) northwest of Prince Albert, Saskatchewan, 760 kilometres (470 mi) northeast of Edmonton, Alberta, and 48 kilometres (30 mi) south of the Northwest Territories-Saskatchewan border. The elevation is 230 metres (750 ft) above sea level. For census purposes, it is located within the province's Division No. 18 territory.

== History ==
In 1949, athabascaite was discovered by S. Kaiman while he was researching radioactive materials around Lake Athabasca near Uranium City.

In 1952, the provincial government decided to establish a community to service the mines in the Beaverlodge uranium area developed by Eldorado Mining and Refining, a federal crown corporation. In 1954, the local newspaper, The Uranium Times, noted that 52 mines were operating and 12 open-pit mines were next to Beaverlodge Lake. Initially, most of the residences in Uranium City were simply tents.

Some of the mines operating in the area included the Gunnar Mine, the Lorado Mine, and the Fay-Ace-Verna Mine in Eldorado, Saskatchewan.

Two options were considered for communities in the region: small communities near the mine site or larger more centralized communities with adequate services. Not wanting to replicate some of the problems associated with small mining towns at the time in Northern Ontario, the government pushed for the second option and modelled Uranium City after the community of Arvida, Quebec. In 1956, the provincial government passed the Municipal Corporation of Uranium City and District Act, creating a unique, chartered "district" with authority over education, health, and welfare.

The population of Uranium City started to grow significantly only once Eldorado Resources made a deliberate initiative in 1960 to see staff housed in Uranium City instead of the Eldorado campsite.

After reaching a population of 2,507 in 1981, the closure of the mines in 1982 led to economic collapse, with most residents of the community leaving. The Uranium City Act was repealed on 1 October 1983, reducing the community to an unincorporated "northern settlement". The local hospital closed in the spring of 2003. Its population in 2016 was 73, including a number of Métis and First Nations people. The town is considered a uranium boomtown due to the rapid increase in population during the mining period and substantial depopulation that followed.

== Demographics ==
Population history of Uranium City
Year	Pop.	±%
1956	1,794	—
1961	1,665	−7.2%
1966	1,665	+0.0%
1971	1,867	+12.1%
1976	1,765	−5.5%
1981	2,507	+42.0%
2011	105	−95.8%
2016	73	−30.5%
2021	91	+24.7%
Source: Statistics Canada

In the 2021 Census of Population conducted by Statistics Canada, Uranium City had a population of 91 living in 41 of its 59 total private dwellings, a change of 24.7% from its 2016 population of 73. With a land area of 5.99 km^{2} (2.31 sq mi), it had a population density of 15.2/km^{2} (39.3/sq mi) in 2021.

== Transportation ==
The community has a certified airport, Uranium City Airport, that features a treated gravel runway of 3,935 ft (1,199 m) operated by the Saskatchewan Ministry of Highways and Infrastructure. The airport is one of the few employers left in the community. West Wind Aviation previously served Uranium City with flights to Prince Albert and Saskatoon three times a week. Norcanair served the community with scheduled flights until it ceased operations in 2005. Transwest Air also provided a route with Saskatoon and Regina until that company cancelled its service in November 2008. Now known as Rise Air, the airline now serves Uranium City with a flight from Saskatoon that stops in Prince Albert, Points North and Stony Rapids. There is also a small water aerodrome located next to Uranium City.

There is no normal road access connecting Uranium City with the rest of Canada. There is provision for a winter road which connects with Fond-du-Lac. Saskatchewan Highway 962 provides travel for a short distance within the local area. A significant bridge replacement project on Highway 962 was conducted in 2001 at the Fredette River.

== Communications ==
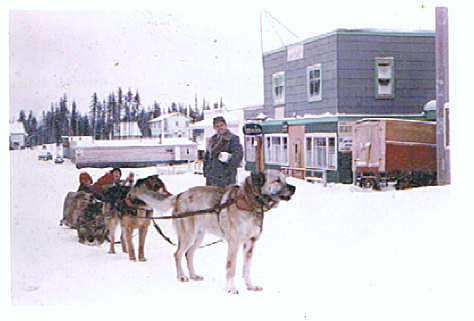
Uranium City in 1953

Local telephone service is provided by SaskTel and was first available in Uranium City on 30 November 1955. Current telephone numbers for international calling are of the form +1 306 498 xxxx (NPA-NXX: 306–498, CLLI: URCYSK05DS0).

Canada Post continues to deliver mail to the community. The post office is located at the municipal office (Postal Code: S0J 2W0).

Radio broadcasting in the community is provided by:

- 97.9 FM – VF2142 – rebroadcasts CKRW-FM
- 99.9 or 101.1 FM – Missinipi Broadcasting Corporation
- 103.1 FM – VF2240 – rebroadcasts CFMI-FM
- 105.1 FM – CBDH-FM, CBC Radio One, rebroadcasting CBKA-FM La Ronge.

Until 2012, television service was provided by CBKAT operating on channel 8 at a power of 15 watts. This was a rebroadcast of CBC Television service from CBKST Saskatoon. Until 2003, the local transmitter's television programming originated from CBC North. This repeater was one of 620 analog television signals nationwide shut down by the CBC on 31 July 2012 due to budget cuts.

== Climate ==
Uranium City experiences a subarctic climate (Köppen Dfc) with cold snowy winters, brief transitional periods, and short, warm, and dry summers. The temperature range is typically large due to cold winter temperatures that often plunge below −30 °C (−22 °F). The highest temperature ever recorded in the settlement was 38.0 °C (100.4 °F) on 30 June 2021 during the 2021 Western North America heat wave. Wind chill factors are prominent as well in the winter months, making the cold temperatures seem to be much colder than they actually are. Additionally, an average of 34 days a year record wind chill readings below −40 °C (−40 °F). The lowest temperature ever recorded in the settlement was −48.9 °C (−56.0 °F) on 15 January 1974 and on 7 February 2021.

Climate data for Uranium City Airport
Month	Jan	Feb	Mar	Apr	May	Jun	Jul	Aug	Sep	Oct	Nov	Dec	Year
Record high °C (°F)	3.3 (37.9)	5.9 (42.6)	11.6 (52.9)	28.9 (84.0)	32.4 (90.3)	38.0 (100.4)	37.2 (99.0)	32.8 (91.0)	29.4 (84.9)	20.4 (68.7)	10.5 (50.9)	5.9 (42.6)	38.0 (100.4)
Mean daily maximum °C (°F)	−21.8 (−7.2)	−16.2 (2.8)	−8.1 (17.4)	3.7 (38.7)	12.8 (55.0)	18.8 (65.8)	21.3 (70.3)	19.3 (66.7)	11.3 (52.3)	3.8 (38.8)	−8.1 (17.4)	−17.7 (0.1)	1.6 (34.9)
Daily mean °C (°F)	−26.8 (−16.2)	−22.0 (−7.6)	−15.0 (5.0)	−2.4 (27.7)	6.9 (44.4)	13.3 (55.9)	16.2 (61.2)	14.5 (58.1)	7.3 (45.1)	0.5 (32.9)	−11.8 (10.8)	−22.1 (−7.8)	−3.5 (25.7)
Mean daily minimum °C (°F)	−31.9 (−25.4)	−28.0 (−18.4)	−22.0 (−7.6)	−8.6 (16.5)	1.0 (33.8)	7.7 (45.9)	11.0 (51.8)	9.6 (49.3)	3.3 (37.9)	−2.8 (27.0)	−15.7 (3.7)	−26.7 (−16.1)	−8.6 (16.5)
Record low °C (°F)	−48.9 (−56.0)	−48.9 (−56.0)	−42.8 (−45.0)	−37.8 (−36.0)	−20.0 (−4.0)	−5.0 (23.0)	3.2 (37.8)	−1.4 (29.5)	−9.4 (15.1)	−25.9 (−14.6)	−41.7 (−43.1)	−45.6 (−50.1)	−48.9 (−56.0)
Average precipitation mm (inches)	20.7 (0.81)	14.8 (0.58)	18.6 (0.73)	19.2 (0.76)	21.4 (0.84)	37.8 (1.49)	53.0 (2.09)	53.5 (2.11)	37.3 (1.47)	35.9 (1.41)	29.2 (1.15)	20.6 (0.81)	361.8 (14.24)
Average rainfall mm (inches)	0.0 (0.0)	0.0 (0.0)	0.2 (0.01)	4.6 (0.18)	17.6 (0.69)	37.7 (1.48)	53.0 (2.09)	53.3 (2.10)	35.7 (1.41)	21.1 (0.83)	0.3 (0.01)	0.2 (0.01)	223.7 (8.81)
Average snowfall cm (inches)	32.9 (13.0)	24.8 (9.8)	27.7 (10.9)	18.9 (7.4)	4.4 (1.7)	0.0 (0.0)	0.0 (0.0)	0.2 (0.1)	2.0 (0.8)	19.2 (7.6)	48.3 (19.0)	36.7 (14.4)	215.1 (84.7)
Average precipitation days	12	10	9	7	8	10	11	12	12	12	15	13	130
Average rainy days (≥ 0.2 mm)	0	trace	trace	2	7	10	11	12	11	7	trace	trace	60
Average snowy days (≥ 0.2 cm)	14	11	10	6	2	trace	0	trace	2	8	16	16	84

== Education ==
Education in Uranium City is under the authority of the Northern Lights School Division #113, a school district that covers most of northern Saskatchewan. The only remaining school in Uranium City is Ben McIntyre School, serving classes from kindergarten to Grade 9. The school opened in 1977 and is named after the first teacher in Uranium City who established the first school in the community in 1952 with 40 students in ten grades. As of September 2024 the number of students enrolled in the school was less than ten.

Secondary education was provided by CANDU High School, named after a nuclear reactor. According to travellers Vincent Chan and Tricia Holopina who visited the city in 2002, locals state that the school was opened in 1979 and closed in 1983 after only three years of service, with the building since sustaining extensive vandalism.

== Notable people ==
The following people are associated with Uranium City by birth, residence or career:

- Bert Burry, pilot and ice hockey player
- Gina Kingsbury, member of gold medal-winning Canadian women's ice hockey team at the 2006 Winter Olympics
- Gilbert LaBine, a founder of the Gunnar Mine

== In popular culture ==
- A fictionalized Uranium City is the subject of Uranium Teen Scream, an incomplete stage trilogy by Brooke Maxwell and Jacob Richmond, focusing on the youth experience in small-town Canada. Legoland, the first installment, was released in 2006, followed by the musical Ride the Cyclone in 2009.
- The community is shown in the Fallout television series as an internment camp for Canadian citizens during an annexation of Canada by the United States.

== See also ==
- List of communities in Northern Saskatchewan
- List of communities in Saskatchewan
- List of uranium projects
- Athabasca System Hydroelectric Stations
- Jeffrey City, Wyoming
- Yellowcake boomtown
