= Tazin Lake =

Lake in Saskatchewan, Canada

- Location in Saskatchewan Tazin Lake (Canada)
- Location: Northern Administration District, Saskatchewan
- Coordinates: 59.7791°N 108.8468°W
- Part of: Mackenzie River drainage basin
- Primary inflows: Tazin River
- River sources: Canadian Shield
- Primary outflows: Tazin River
- Basin countries: Canada
- Surface elevation: 348 m (1,142 ft)
- Islands: Laird Island; Dewdney Island

Tazin Lake is a lake in the Canadian province of Saskatchewan. It is along the course of the Tazin River.

== See also ==
- List of lakes of Saskatchewan
