= Lake Athabasca =

Lake in Western Canada

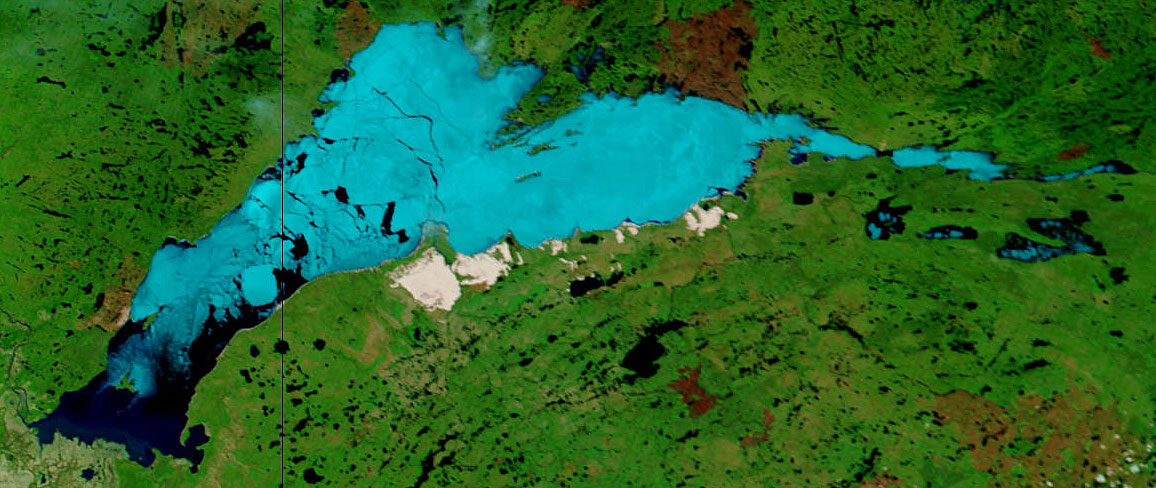
- Ice breakup on Lake Athabasca (June 9, 2002)

- Location in Saskatchewan Lake Athabasca (Canada)

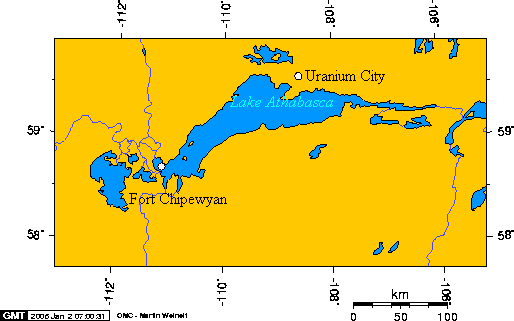
- Location: Northern Administration District, Saskatchewan; Regional Municipality of Wood Buffalo, Alberta
- Coordinates: 60°N 110°W
- Lake type: Glacial
- Part of: Mackenzie River drainage basin
- Primary inflows: Athabasca River; William River; MacFarlane River; Colin River; Fond du Lac River
- Primary outflows: Rivière des Rochers, which meets with the Peace to form the Slave
- Catchment area: 271,000 km^{2} (105,000 sq mi)
- Basin countries: Canada
- Max. length: 283 km (176 mi)
- Max. width: 50 km (31 mi)
- Surface area: 7,849 km^{2} (3,031 sq mi)
- Average depth: 20 m (66 ft)
- Max. depth: 124 m (407 ft)
- Water volume: 204 km^{3} (49 cu mi)
- Shore length^{1}: ≈2,140 km (1,330 mi)
- Surface elevation: 213 m (699 ft)
- Settlements: Fort Chipewyan; Uranium City; Camsell Portage; Fond du Lac
- ^{1} Shore length is not a well-defined measure.

Lake Athabasca (/ˌæθəˈbæskə/ ATH-ə-BASS-kə; French: lac Athabasca; from Woods Cree: ᐊᖬᐸᐢᑳᐤ aðapaskāw, "[where] there are plants one after another") is in the northwest corner of Saskatchewan and the northeast corner of Alberta between 58° and 60° N in Canada. The lake is about 26% in Alberta and 74% in Saskatchewan.

The lake is fed by the Athabasca River and other rivers, and its water flows northward via the Slave River to the Mackenzie River system, eventually reaching the Arctic Ocean.

== Toponymy ==
The name in the Woods Cree language originally referred only to the Peace–Athabasca Delta formed by the confluence of the Peace and Athabasca rivers at the southwest corner of the lake. Prior to 1789, Sir Alexander Mackenzie explored the lake. In 1791, Philip Turnor, cartographer for the Hudson's Bay Company, wrote in his journal, "low swampy ground on the South side with a few willows growing upon it, from which the Lake in general takes its name Athapison in the Southern Cree tongue which signifies open country such as lakes with willows and grass growing about them". Peter Fidler originally recorded the name for the river in 1790 as the Great Arabuska. By 1801, the name had gained a closer spelling to the current name—Athapaskow Lake. By 1820, George Simpson referred to both the lake and the river as "Athabasca".

== Geography ==
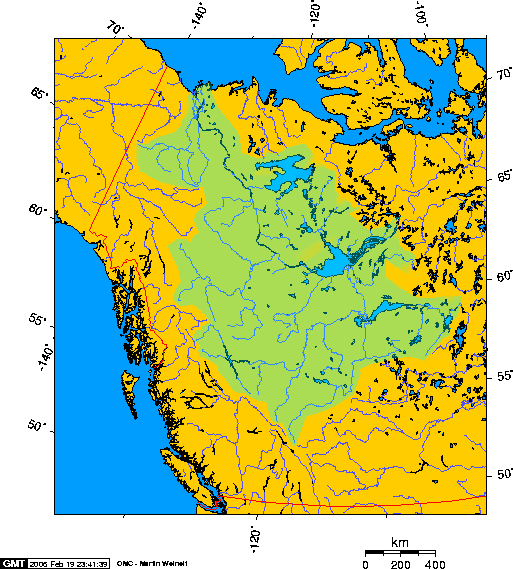
Mackenzie River drainage basin showing Lake Athabasca's position south of Great Slave Lake

The lake covers 7,849 square kilometres (3,031 sq mi) or 7,935 square kilometres (3,064 sq mi) including islands, is 283 kilometres (176 mi) long, has a maximum width of 50 kilometres (31 mi), and a maximum depth of 124 metres (407 ft), and holds 204 cubic kilometres (49 cu mi) of water, making it the largest and one of the deepest lakes in both Alberta and Saskatchewan (nearby Tazin Lake is deeper), and the eighth largest in Canada. It is the 20th largest lake in the world by area. Water flows northward from the lake via the Slave River and Mackenzie River systems, eventually reaching the Arctic Ocean.

Fort Chipewyan, one of the oldest European settlements in Alberta, is on the western shore of the lake, where the Rivière des Rochers drains the lake and flows toward Slave River, beginning its northward journey along the eastern boundary of Wood Buffalo National Park. The eastern section of the lake narrows to a width of about 1 kilometre (0.62 mi) near the community of Fond du Lac on the northern shore then continues to its most easterly point at the mouth of the Fond du Lac River.

Fidler Point on the north shore of Lake Athabasca is named for Peter Fidler, a surveyor and map maker for the Hudson's Bay Company.

Along with other lakes such as the Great Bear Lake and Great Slave Lake, Lake Athabasca is a remnant of the vast Glacial Lake McConnell.

=== Tributaries ===
Tributaries of Lake Athabasca include (going clockwise):

- Fond du Lac River
- Otherside River
- Helmer Creek
- MacFarlane River
- Archibald River
- William River
- Ennuyeuse Creek
- Dumville Creek
- Debussac Creek
- Jackfish Creek
- Claussen Creek
- Old Fort River
- Crown Creek
- Athabasca River
- Colin River
- Oldman River
- Bulyea River
- Grease River
- Robillard River

== History ==
First Nations have lived in the area for more than 2,000 years. In the era of the North American fur trade, the lake was a pivotal point, since it was as far west as canoes could travel from the east and still return before freeze-up. The first European settlement on Lake Athabasca is Fort Chipewyan, founded as a North West Company (NWC) trading post in 1788. Its original location was Old Fort Point, on the southwest shore west of the Old Fort River. In 1798, Fort Chipewyan was relocated to its current site on the north shore.

In fall 1790, Malcolm Ross, Peter Fidler, Philip Turnor, and others, all working for the Hudson's Bay Company (HBC), travelled from Cumberland House to Île-à-la-Crosse, and on to Lake Athabasca the following spring. They established a HBC fur trade post on the south-west shore of the lake, opposite Fort Chipewyan. The HBC post, also called Athapescow Lake, was abandoned in 1792.

In 1802, the HBC set up another post on English Island at the lake's outlet, called Nottingham House, but was abandoned in 1806. In 1815, the HBC tried competing again with the NWC and founded Fort Wedderburn on Coal or Potato Island. When the HBC and NWC merged in 1821, Fort Wedderburn was also abandoned by moving all operations to Fort Chipewyan.

== Development and environment ==
Uranium and gold mining along the northern shore resulted in the birth of Uranium City, Saskatchewan, which was home to mine workers and their families. While the last mine closed in the 1980s, the effects of mining operations had already heavily contaminated the northern shores. The large oil sands mining nearby is suspected to have added to the current pollution levels in the lake.

On October 31, 2013, one of Obed Mountain coal mine's pits failed, and between 600 million and one billion litres of slurry poured into the Plante and Apetowun Creeks. The plume of waste products then joined the Athabasca River, travelling downstream for a month before settling in Lake Athabasca near Fort Chipewyan, over 500 kilometres (310 mi) away.

The Lake Athabasca Sand Dunes, the largest active sand dunes in the world north of 58°, are adjacent to the southern shore in Saskatchewan. The dunes were designated a Provincial Wilderness Park in 1992.

== Fish species ==
Lake Athabasca contains 23 species of fish, with a world record lake trout of 46.3 kilograms (102 lb) caught from its depths in 1961 by means of a gillnet. Other fish species include walleye, yellow perch, northern pike, goldeye, lake whitefish, cisco, Arctic grayling, burbot, white sucker, and longnose sucker.

== See also ==
- Athabasca Country
- Peace–Athabasca Delta
- List of lakes of Saskatchewan
- List of lakes of Alberta
- List of place names in Canada of Indigenous origin
