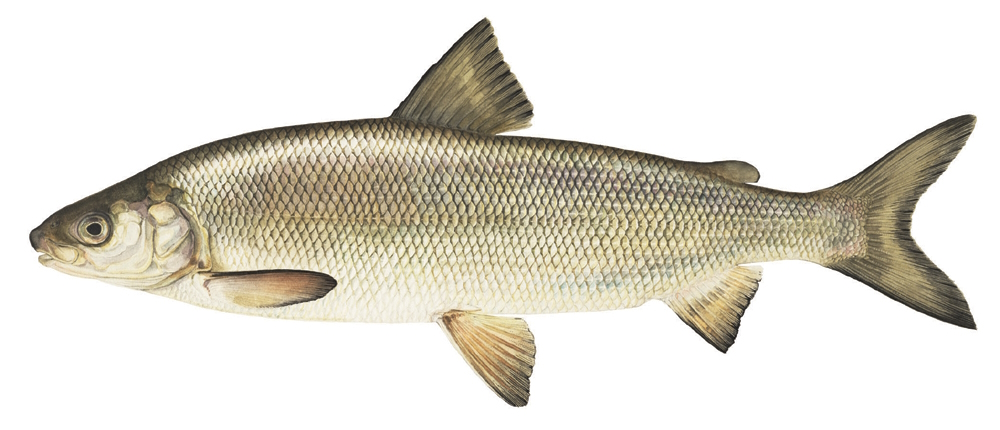

Conservation status
- Secure (NatureServe)

Scientific classification
- Kingdom: Animalia
- Phylum: Chordata
- Class: Actinopterygii
- Division: Teleostei
- Order: Salmoniformes
- Family: Salmonidae
- Genus: Coregonus
- Species: C. clupeaformis

Binomial name
- Coregonus clupeaformis (Mitchill, 1818)
- Range of C. clupeaformis

Synonyms
- List: Coregonus albus Lesueur, 1818; Coregonus atikameg Bajkov, 1933; Coregonus clupeaformis subsp. dustini Koelz, 1931; Coregonus clupeaformis subsp. gulliveri Koelz, 1931; Coregonus clupeaformis subsp. latus Koelz, 1931; Coregonus clupeaformis subsp. medorae Koelz, 1931; Coregonus clupeiformis (Mitchill, 1818); Coregonus labradoricus (Richardson, 1836); Coregonus latior Agassiz, 1850; Coregonus neohantoniensis Prescott, 1851; Coregonus odonoghuei Bajkov, 1929; Coregonus sapidissimus Agassiz, 1850; Salmo clupeaformis Mitchill, 1818; Salmo labradoricus Richardson, 1836; Salmo otsego Clinton, 1822

= Lake whitefish =

Species of fish

The lake whitefish (Coregonus clupeaformis) is a species of freshwater whitefish from North America. Lake whitefish are found throughout much of Canada and parts of the northern United States, including all of the Great Lakes. The lake whitefish is sometimes referred to as a "humpback" fish due because of its small head size in relation to the length of the body. (Note: Not to be confused with Coregonus pidschian, the humpback whitefish.) It is a valuable commercial fish and also occasionally taken by sport fishermen. Smoked, refrigerated, or vacuum-packed lake whitefish fillets are available in North American grocery stores. Other vernacular names used for this fish include Otsego bass, Sault whitefish, gizzard fish, common whitefish, eastern whitefish, Great Lakes whitefish, humpback whitefish, inland whitefish and whitefish.

== Etymology ==
The scientific genus name Coregonus (co-regg'-on-us) means "angle eye" in Greek, and the species name clupeaformis means "herring-shaped" in Latin.

== Description ==
The lake whitefish is similar in appearance to other whitefishes in the Coregoninae subfamily of the salmon family Salmonidae, such as the northern cisco (Coregonus artedi). As with all salmonids, it has an adipose fin. To the distinction from cisco, the lake whitefish has a snout which overhangs the short lower jaw, so that the mouth opens in a slightly inferior position. Thus the fish can feed on the bottom of lake beds or grab food particulates out of the water or from the surface of a water body. The cisco in turn has a short snout with a lower jaw that extends beyond the snout. Both the cisco and lake whitefish are discernible from the mooneye due to the small posterior dorsal adipose fin. In early life stages the cisco and lake whitefish are indistinguishable based on morphological characters alone, with genetic analyses being necessary to reliably identify species. Another notable feature of the lake whitefish is the presence of two small flaps in each nostril. Its coloration is typically silver to white with an olive to pale-green or brown dorsal hues. The ventral fins are white, and the tail has a dark posterior edge.

Lake whitefish from inland lakes can reach a weight upwards of 5 pounds (2,300 g); the largest caught on rod and reel weighed 14 pounds 6 oz, from Meaford, Ontario, in 1984. On average, the lake whitefish weighs around 4 pounds. They can grow to 31 inches (79 cm) and commonly reach 20 inches (51 cm).

== Life history ==
=== Habitat ===
Lake whitefish are cool water fish. They are found in a large number of inland lakes, and they have been known to enter brackish water. The lake whitefish is distributed from Alaska and western Canada to the Atlantic coastal drainage of Maine and in New Brunswick north to Labrador.

=== Reproduction ===
Lake whitefish spawn from September through January in water two to four metres in depth during the night. In the autumn, mature lake whitefish enter the shallows to lay their eggs on shoals of rubble and gravel. There is no parental care of the young. In the following spring the young will hatch. In northwestern Canada, a large spawning migration enters the Athabasca Delta in late summer, moving upstream in the Athabasca River. The longest single movement of a tagged whitefish was 388 km (241 mi), from Fort McMurray to the north shore of Lake Athabasca in Alberta.

=== Diet ===
Fish of larval and postlarval stages feed on plankton. Once the larvae reach 3–4 inches (76–102 mm) they switch to feeding on bottom-dwelling animals (snail, insect larvae, zebra mussels, and fingernail clams) which they will consume for the remainder of their lives. In late June and July, some inland lake populations of ciscoe and lake whitefish leave the deep, cool waters to feast on emerging mayflies and midges. Natural predators include burbot, lake trout, and northern pike.

== Fishing ==
=== Commercial fishing ===
Lake whitefish is one of the most important species for commercial inland fisheries in North America. The total annual catch in 1999 from Canada was 8,328 tons and 5,353 tons in the United States. Lake whitefish is the prime commercial species of the upper Great Lakes fishery, because this delicately flavored fresh fish has high local consumer acceptance. An average of 11 million pounds was harvested from the Great Lakes annually from 1981 to 1999. Although the harvest has declined from 9.5 to 8 million pounds in recent years, prices have not increased. Instead, the price for Great Lakes lake whitefish, which once reached as high as $1.04/lb., currently averages $.75/lb. and has dropped to as low as $.40/lb during periods of high production. Commercial fishing has allowed for the spread of this fish into many different markets, restaurants, and grocery store shelves.

=== Sport fishing ===
Many anglers also enjoy hooking this fish in the months of June, July and early August. A simple line and jig system is enough to catch the fish as they feast on mayflies and midges. In winter months, catching ice fishing is popular, particularly in northern Wisconsin, with many fishing guides specializing in this species. Successful ice fishing techniques include using a jigging spoon, with at least one "slider hook" above and separated from the spoon with a barrel swivel, and all hooks tipped with wax worms.

== Conservation ==
A major threat to the lake whitefish is the invasive sea lamprey. In Lake Michigan sea lamprey began to decimate indigenous fish populations in the 1930s and 1940s. It may have entered the Great Lakes region through the Erie Canal which opened in 1825. and spread even further in 1919 with improvements to the Welland Canal. In Lakes Michigan and Huron, the invasive Quagga mussel poses a threat by filtering out the zooplankton that are the main food source for juvenile whitefish.

== Evolution ==
Since the end of the last glaciation (about 12,000 years ago), whitefish have colonized many North American lakes, from different directions, from refugia that represent genetically diverged stocks or races. Whitefish diversified into different populations locally, such that now in many lakes two main ecotypes are recognized within the species: a normal and a dwarf ecotype. These normal and dwarf ecotypes are mainly differentiated by the benthic and pelagic zone they occupy, respectively. Normal whitefish also grow much bigger and live much longer than the dwarf ecotype.

Many of these populations live in sympatry, yet are reproductively isolated. The fact that they are young species makes them prime candidate to study the evolutionary forces driving their ecological divergence and reproductive isolation.
