= Grey Owl =

Canadian writer, lecturer and conservationist (1888–1938)

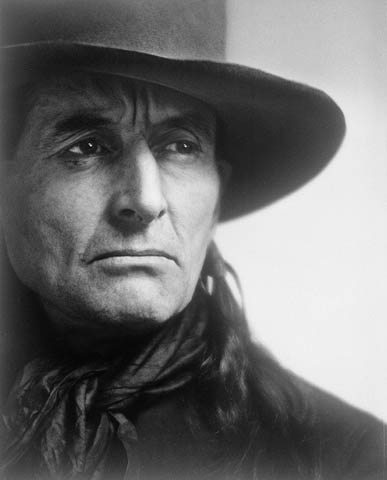
- Portrait by Yousuf Karsh, 1936
- Born: Archibald Stansfeld Belaney; September 18, 1888; Hastings, East Sussex, England
- Died: April 13, 1938 (aged 49); Prince Albert, Saskatchewan, Canada
- Education: Hastings Grammar School
- Occupations: Writer, lecturer, conservationist
- Employers: Dominion Parks Service
- Known for: Environmental conservation
- Spouses: Angele Egwuna (m. 1910) Ivy Holmes (m. 1917–1922) Yvonne Perrier (m. 1936)
- Partner: Gertrude Bernard
- Children: 4

Archibald Stansfeld Belaney (September 18, 1888 – April 13, 1938), commonly known as Grey Owl, was a popular Canadian writer, public speaker and conservationist. Born an Englishman, he immigrated to Canada and, in the latter years of his life, passed as half-Indigenous, falsely claiming that he was the son of a Scottish man and an Apache woman. (Note: Grey Owl gave his London publisher, Lovat Dickson, the following account of his origins: He was the son of a Scottish father and Apache mother. He claimed his father was a man named George MacNeil, who had been a scout during the 1870s Indian Wars in the southwestern United States. Grey Owl said his mother was Katherine Cochise of the Apache Jicarilla band. He further said that both parents had been part of the Wild Bill Hickok Western show that toured England. Grey Owl claimed to have been born in 1888 in Hermosillo, Mexico, while his parents were performing there.) With books, articles and public appearances promoting wilderness conservation, he achieved fame in the 1930s. Shortly after his death in 1938, his real identity as the Englishman Archie Belaney was exposed. He has been called one of the first Canadian "Pretendians".

Moving to Canada as a young man, Belaney established himself as a woodsman and trapper, before rising to prominence as an author and lecturer. While working for the Dominion Parks Branch of Canada in the 1930s, Belaney was named the "caretaker of park animals", first at Riding Mountain National Park in Manitoba and then at Prince Albert National Park in Saskatchewan. His views on wilderness conservation, expressed in numerous articles, books, lectures and films, reached audiences beyond the borders of Canada, bringing attention to the negative impact of exploiting nature and the urgent need to develop respect for the natural world. He was particularly concerned about the plight of the beaver (Canada's national animal), which by the 1920s had been hunted almost to extinction.

Recognition of Belaney includes biographies, academic studies, historic plaques in England, Ontario and Quebec, and a film based on his life, directed by Richard Attenborough.

== Early life (1888–1906) ==
Archibald Stansfeld Belaney was born on September 18, 1888, in Hastings, England, into an upper-middle-class English family. His father was George Belaney and his mother Katherine "Kittie" Cox. His paternal grandfather had come from Scotland and married in England.

Kittie was George Belaney's second wife. Before Archie's birth, George had immigrated to the United States with his then-wife Elizabeth Cox and her younger sister, Kittie. After Elizabeth's early death, George married 15-year-old Kittie. Within the year, they returned to England in time for the birth of their son Archie. George was unable to settle down to steady employment and wasted much of the family's fortune on various unsuccessful business ventures. He agreed to return permanently to the United States in exchange for a small allowance. Archie remained in England in the care of his father's mother, Juliana Belaney, and his father's two younger sisters, Janet Adelaide Belaney and Julia Caroline Belaney, whom the boy would know as Aunt Ada and Aunt Carry. It was Aunt Ada who would come to dominate Archie's early life.

Belaney attended Hastings Grammar School, where he excelled in subjects such as English, French and chemistry. "He mixed little with the other students in class, or afterwards. The shy, withdrawn boy, ashamed of having been abandoned by his parents, lived largely in his own world." Outside school, he spent time reading and exploring St Helen's Wood near his home. He also collected snakes and other small animals.

Belaney was known for pranks, such as using his chemistry set to make small explosives, which he called "Belaney Bombs". A family friend later recalled that he "used to come to our house in Quarry Road with his pockets full of snakes, and he was always keen on Red Indians and making wigwams the garden." "He used to make gunpowder and one Sunday he buried some in our garden and the explosion shook all the windows in the road. On another occasion he was cutting up phosphorus for gunpowder and set light to the curtains in the room."

Belaney was fascinated by the Indigenous peoples of the Americas, reading about them and drawing pictures of them in the margins of his books. He prepared maps showing the linguistic divisions in Canada and the locations of the tribes. His knowledge impressed his aunt Ada, who was "amazed at his knowledge of the detail... He was not interested in the romantic picture of the Indians but in their mastery over nature..." Young Belaney enjoyed playing at being Indians with his childhood friend Ivy Holmes, calling himself "Big Chief Thunderbinder".

Belaney left Hastings Grammar School and worked for a short time as a clerk in a lumber yard. He hated the job and ensured a sudden end to it by almost destroying the building with fireworks. Although, in agreement with his aunt Ada, he was supposed to work longer in England, he was finally allowed to move to Canada, with the understanding he would "learn to be a farmer while he was getting used to the country".

On March 29, 1906, at the age of 18, Belaney boarded SS Canada for Halifax, Nova Scotia. Arriving on April 6, he went to Toronto, where, with no intention of becoming a farmer, he worked for some time in a retail shop (perhaps Eaton's).

== First years in Canada (1906–1915) ==
Against the horizon & beyond the edge of the low range of hills that bounded a distance of full 30 miles, a heavy column of smoke rose & seemed to meet the sky where it turned & rolled off in immense billows to the south, the smoke of a forest fire. Over all shone the sun bringing into contrast the lights & shades of hill and valley. To me this was a wonderful sight; my first glimpse of the wilderness.

— Grey Owl, quoted in From the Land of Shadows: the Making of Grey Owl

Toronto held no appeal for Belaney, and he soon left, bound for Lake Temagami, one of the largest lakes in northern Ontario, and home of the Teme-Augama Anishnabai (deep water people) community. (Note: There are a number of accounts of Belaney's movements and activities between his departure from Toronto and arrival in Temagami (including Smith's account that has Belaney spending the winter of 1906–1907 in Temiskaming with Bill Guppy), but none of them have convincing corroboration. See "The Myth of Bill Guppy" in Ontario History.) In 1907 he was working at the Temagami Inn as a "chore-boy". He returned home to Hastings for a short visit during the winter of 1907–1908. He learned then that his father had been killed in a drunken brawl in the United States.

Belaney returned to Canada in 1908. He determined to lose the remaining traces of his English accent. At the Temagami Inn he met Angele Egwuna, who was working there as a kitchen-helper. She spoke little English and he little Ojibwe, but a friendship developed. Through Angele he also met members of her family, who called him "gitchi-saganash" (tall Englishman). Her uncle gave him the nickname "ko-hom-see" (little owl), a name that would be transformed years later into "Grey Owl".

The Egwunas invited Belaney to spend the winter of 1909–1910 trapping with them in the bush to the east of the south arm of Lake Temagami, where he learned how the Temagami Ojibwe managed their hunting territories by killing only the animals that they needed and leaving the rest to reproduce. The time with the Egwunas improved both his proficiency with the Ojibwe language and the skills he needed to survive and make a living in the bush. Belaney would later report this as his "formal adoption" by the Ojibwe. The boy from Hastings was finally living the life he had dreamed of.

In the summers of 1910 and 1911, Belaney worked as a guide at Camp Keewaydin, an American boys’ camp on Lake Temagami. On August 23, 1910, he and Angele Egwuna were married on Bear Island in a Christian ceremony. In spring 1911 their daughter Agnes was born.

In the summer of 1912, he moved to Biscotasing, where he worked in the surrounding area as a forest ranger during the summers of 1912–1914 and spent the winters in the bush on the trapline. In Bisco, Belaney began a relationship with Marie Girard, a Métis woman who worked as a maid in the boarding-house where he stayed. At his invitation she joined him on his trapline during the winter of 1913–1914.

In June, 1915, he sailed for England with the Canadian Army. Marie Girard died of tuberculosis in the fall of 1915, shortly after giving birth to their son, John Jero.

In his first years in Canada, Belaney had established himself as a backcountry woodsman, with a keen appreciation of the wilderness. At some point he also began to develop the fiction of having been born in Mexico to a Scottish man and an Apache woman. His debut as husband and father had not been a success: "Archie kept falling deeper and deeper into personal problems of his own making, going from one crisis to another."

== In the Canadian Army (1915–1917) ==
Belaney enlisted with the Canadian Overseas Expeditionary Force on May 6, 1915, during the First World War. (Note: His attestation papers show that he claimed to have been born in Montreal on September 18, 1888, had no next of kin and was not married. He stated his trade was "trapper" and that he had previously served in the "Mexican Scouts, 28th Dragoons".) In June he was shipped to England and initially assigned to the 23rd Reserve Battalion in Kent. He later joined the 13th Battalion (Royal Highlanders of Canada), known as the Black Watch, and was shipped to the front line in France, where he served as a sniper. Fellow soldiers accepted his assumed Indian identity, with one writing that he "...saw him squirm up muddy hills in a way no white man could. He had all the actions and features of an Indian.... Never in all my life did I ever meet a man who was better able to hide when we would go out onto No Man's Land."

Belaney was wounded in the right wrist on January 15, 1916. Then, on April 23, he was shot in the right foot, a serious injury from which he never fully recovered. He was shipped back to England, where it was found necessary to amputate a toe. From November 1916 to March 1917, he convalesced in the Canadian Military Hospital in his home town of Hastings.

Encouraged by his aunts, Belaney renewed his childhood friendship with Ivy Holmes. Ivy, then 26, was an accomplished professional dancer, who had travelled extensively in Europe. Acquainted with her since childhood, he dispensed with the pretense of being Indian. She found that his stories about canoeing in Canada made the "backwoods sound terribly attractive". Belaney was silent about his wife and child back in Canada. They were married on February 10, 1917.

The couple decided that Belaney would return to Canada and establish himself near Biscotasing, then send for Ivy, who "looked forward to seeing his beloved wilderness". Exactly how he thought that plan would work out, with a legal wife and child no more than 100 kilometers away and (as far as he knew) a mistress in the same town, is a mystery. Belaney left for Canada on September 19, 1917. Ivy never saw him again. He wrote to her for a year until he finally admitted that he was already married. Ivy divorced him in 1922.

== Back to Canada (1917–1925) ==
Belaney returned to Canada in September 1917, and was discharged from the army at the end of November because of his injuries. He returned to Biscotasing, where he gained a reputation for drunk and disorderly conduct. Despite this, he made a favorable impression on many people, one person recalling "[I] liked immensely this endearing rebel. Archie was one of the nicest things that happened to me when I was growing up."

Belaney spent much of 1918 recuperating and gradually regained control of his right foot, but the disability remained for the rest of his life, with his foot sometimes swelling to twice its normal size. He did not approach Johnny and the boy did not learn who his father was till years later. He finally admitted to Ivy that he was already married, which ended their relationship. (He would be served divorce papers in 1921.) Now he had a new worry: His aunts were furious with him and regarded his treatment of Angele and Ivy as "nothing less than diabolical".

In the summer of 1919, Belaney worked on a survey party in the bush. A co-worker recalled "The 'Mexican half-breed' had an unattractive side. 'He was taciturn and morose, with a violent, almost maniacal temper.'"

His best friends in Bisco were the Espaniels, an Indigenous family with whom he lived in the early 1920s. He joined them for two winters trapping at Indian Lake on the east branch of the Spanish River. Belaney also maintained a cabin on his hunting ground nearby at Mozhabong Lake. His command of the Ojibwe language benefited from this time with the Espaniels, and he also learned the "Indian way of doing things" – which in Jim Espaniel's words "the white man calls conservation".

In the summers of 1920 and 1921, he worked as the deputy forest ranger on the Mississagi Forest Reserve.

Here Archie was at his best, on the five three-week tours through the huge reserve, checking on the summer ranger stations situated 50 to 60 kilometres from each other.... [Belaney] loved the wilderness. He insisted that [the men under his supervision] carefully check all camping sites for fire and also work on the trails, keeping up the portages to the different lakes in their district, allowing access in case of a fire.

Worried about the logging of Ontario's remaining old-growth pine forests, Belaney wanted the Mississagi area made into a park. In a fledgling attempt at conservationism, he posted signs saying "GOD MADE THIS COUNTRY FOR THE TREES DON’T BURN IT UP AND MAKE IT LOOK LIKE HELL" and "GOD MADE THE COUNTRY BUT MAN DESTROYED IT".

Inspired by his boyhood reading of authors such as Fenimore Cooper and Longfellow, Belaney invented his own elaborately choreographed "war dance", which "...surprised the local Ojibwa and Cree for, as fur buyer Jack Leve put it, 'The Bisco Indians didn't know his brand of Indian lore.'" Local reactions to the war dance were mixed, with some people saying it was good fun, while others said it was just an excuse for drinking. Some Indigenous men joined in, while others thought the dance was evil.

On Victoria Day, May 23, 1923, Belaney performed a war dance in celebration of the occasion.

In April, 1925, an arrest warrant was issued for Belaney after a particularly egregious piece of misbehaviour. Soon after, he left Bisco for good, returning to Temagami and taking up again with Angele, who bore him a second daughter, Flora, in 1926. Amazingly, there is no record of Angele ever reproaching him for his treatment of her, and she appeared to accept his wayward conduct to the end. In the fall of 1925, she saw him off at the train station – and never saw him again. By then, Belaney had already begun his fourth relationship.

== Transformation into Grey Owl (1925–1931) ==
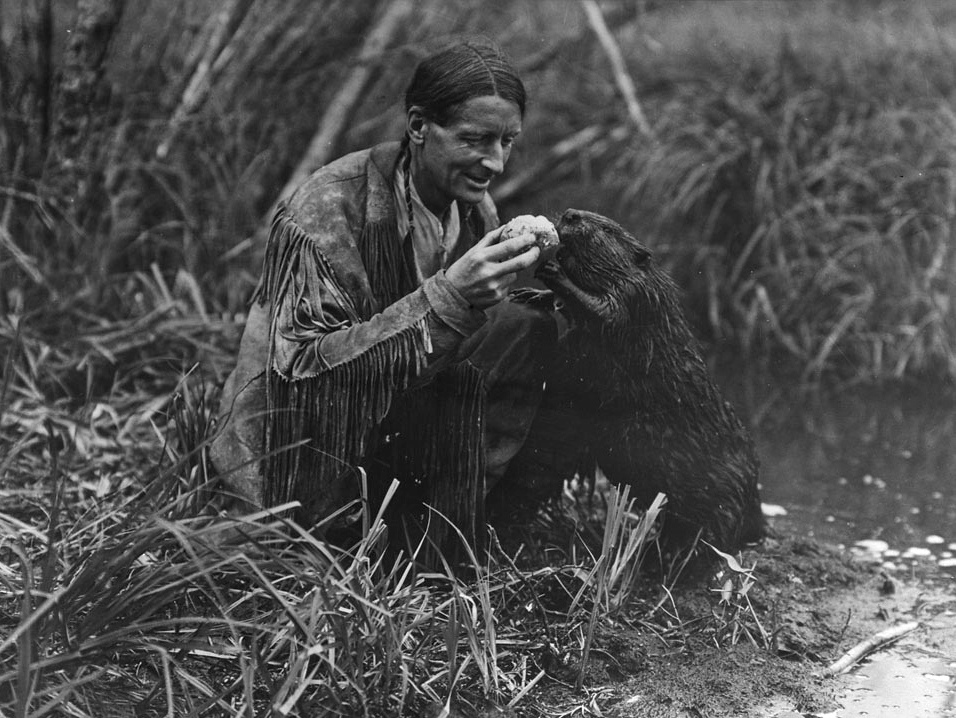
Grey Owl feeding a jelly roll to a beaver

The transformation of Archie Belaney from a backcountry woodsman into the popular writer and public speaker Grey Owl began in 1925. His concern, expressed in books, articles and public appearances, was the vanishing wilderness and the consequences of this for the creatures living in it, including man. His message was "Remember you belong to nature, not it to you."

In the late summer of 1925, 36-year-old Belaney began courting 19-year-old Gertrude Bernard. Their relationship would last till 1936, and prove to be both tumultuous and a crucial factor in Belaney's transformation. They met at Camp Wabikon, located on Temagami Island, where he was working as a guide. She was of Algonquin and Mohawk descent.

Her father's nickname for her was "Pony", but she would come to be known by another name, "Anahareo". According to her account in Devil in Deerskins: My Life with Grey Owl, Belaney's answer to her father's question about his background was this: "I come from Mexico. [M]y father was Scotch and my mother was an Apache Indian." Anahareo did not discover Belaney's true identity until his death and exposure in 1938. (Note: Grey Owl's London publisher and friend, Lovat Dickson, was also convinced by his story to the end and spent months after his death trying to disprove the claim that Grey Owl was in fact an Englishman, going so far as to ask Anahareo to England "expressly to meet Mrs. Scott-Brown, Archie's mother, hoping that [Anahareo] would, or could, detect in her a drop of Indian blood".)

In February, 1926, Anahareo joined Belaney near Doucet in the Abitibi region of northwestern Quebec, where he was earning a living as a trapper. Their courtship was eventful at times. Anahareo later claimed she once stabbed Belaney with a knife. In summer Belaney proposed to her. Due to his undissolved marriage to his first wife, Angele Egwuna, the couple could not marry under Canadian law, but the chief of the Lac Simon Band of Indians declared them husband and wife.

After a summer working as a fire ranger in Quebec, Belaney was back trapping again in the winter of 1926–1927. Anahareo accompanied him on the trapline and was horrified by what she experienced:

Nothing in her small-town up-bringing had prepared her for the heart-wrenching sight of the frozen corpses of animals who had died in agony while trying desperately to escape from the unyielding metal jaws of the leghold traps. Nor could she bear to watch as Archie used the wooden handle of his axe to club to death those who were still living.

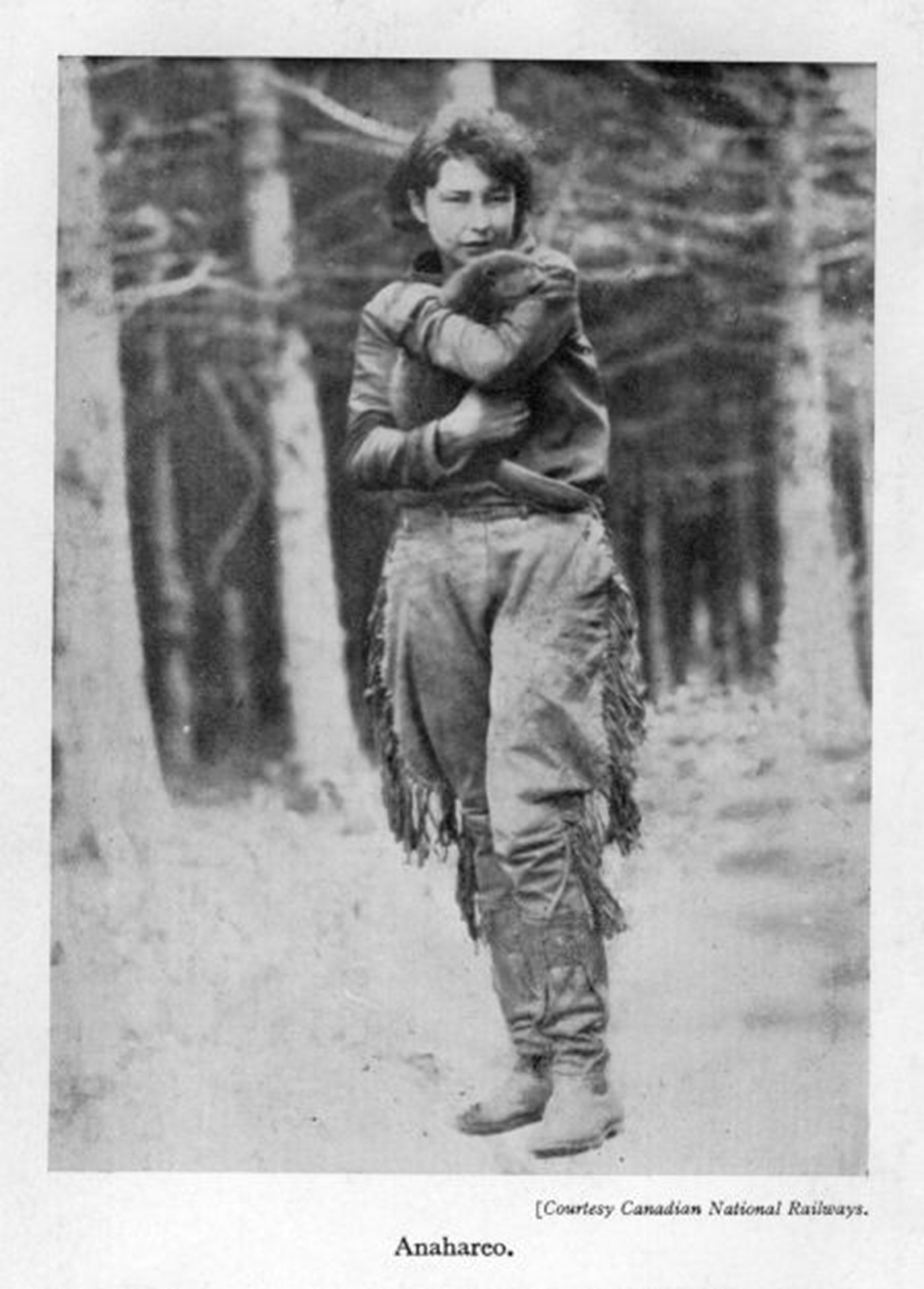
Anahareo holding a beaver

She attempted to make him see the torture that animals suffered when they were caught in traps. According to the account given in Pilgrims of the Wild, Belaney located a beaver lodge, which he knew to be occupied by a mother beaver, and set a trap for her. When the mother beaver was caught, he began to canoe away to the cries of the kittens, which greatly resemble the sound of human infants. Anahareo begged him to set the mother free, but, needing the money from the beaver's pelt, he could not be swayed. The next day he rescued the baby beavers, which the couple adopted. As Albert Braz stated in his article "St. Archie of the Wild", "[P]rimarily because of this episode, Belaney comes to believe that it is 'monstrous' to hunt such creatures and determines to 'study them' rather than 'persecuting them further'."

In 1928, lured by stories of abundant wildlife and bush, Belaney and Anahareo, along with the adopted beavers, McGinnis and McGinty, moved to southeastern Quebec, where they were to reside until 1931. Their intention was to set up a beaver colony, where the beavers would be protected and could be studied. Arriving in Cabano in autumn to find the vicinity heavily logged and unsuitable, they moved to the area of Lake Touladi, east of Lake Témiscouata, and built a cabin on Birch Lake, where they spent Christmas and the rest of winter. They found a family of beaver in the vicinity.

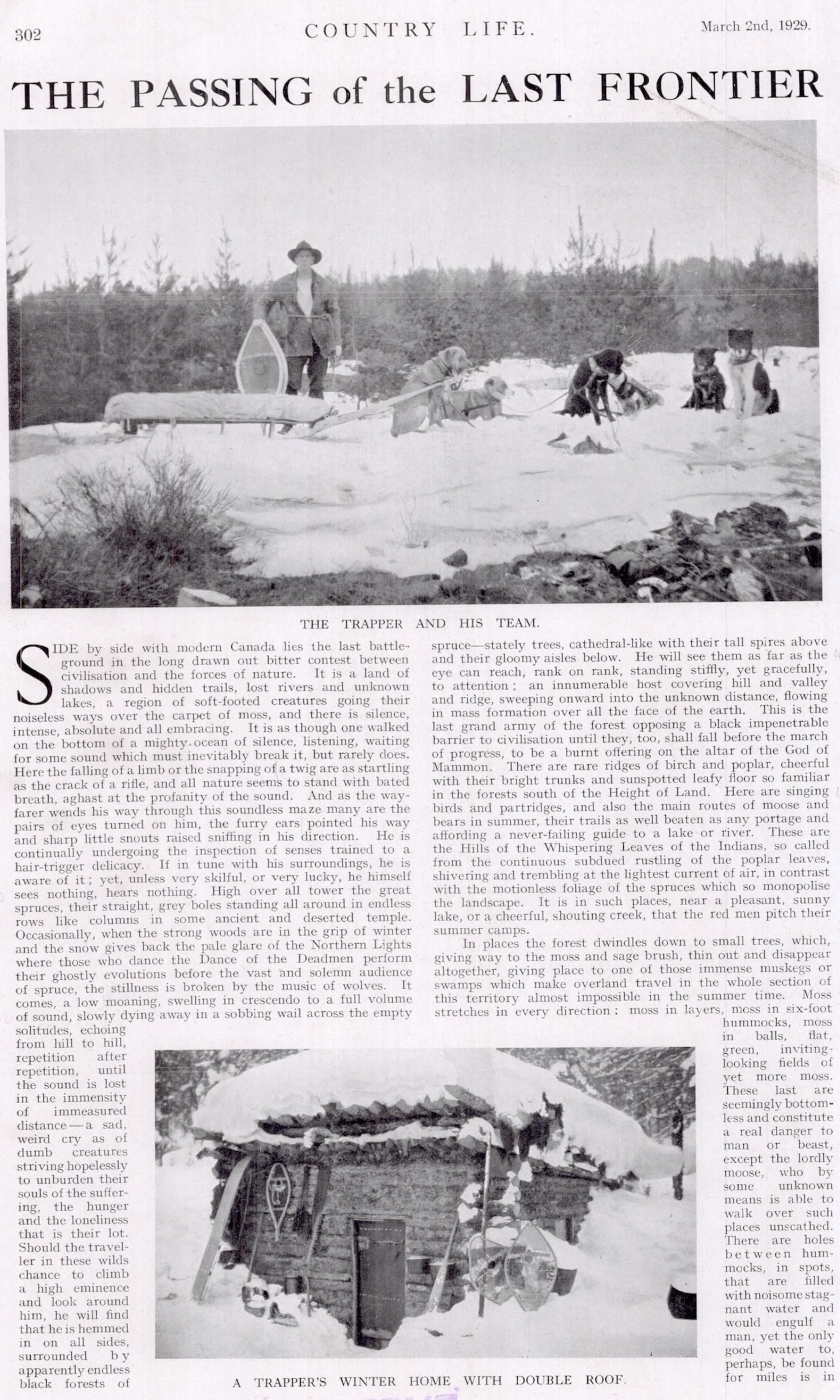
"The Passing of the Last Frontier"

Belaney's first article, "The Passing of the Last Frontier", was published on March 2, 1929 in the English magazine Country Life. The article was submitted by his mother, Katherine Scott-Brown, and the magazine mistakenly attributed the authorship to her. In a later issue they ran a correction identifying the author as her son, Archibald Stansfeld Belaney. In March 1929, Belaney received a check for the article and a request from the publisher for the book that would be published in 1931 as The Men of the Last Frontier.

An unfortunate incident occurred that put an end to their dream of founding a beaver colony on Birch Lake: A friend of theirs, David White Stone, had arrived at their cabin while they were away and, unaware of their plans, had trapped the beavers that were to be the start of the colony. Then yet another unfortunate incident occurred: The two beavers, McGinnis and McGinty, disappeared. The couple was devastated by the incidents. David White Stone and Anahareo found two beaver kittens to replace the "two Micks". One of them soon died. They adopted the surviving beaver, naming it Jelly Roll, and moved to a cabin on Hay Lake near Cabano. At the end of summer the three relocated for some time to the nearby resort town of Metis, where Belaney gave his first public lecture. He moved back to Hay Lake with Jelly Roll, while Anahareo and David White Stone left to work his mining claim in northern Quebec.

In 1930, Belaney published his first article for the periodical Canadian Forest and Outdoors, "The Vanishing Life of the Wild". Under the name "Grey Owl" he wrote many articles for the periodical in the following years, becoming increasingly known in Canada and the United States. In June he inadvertently caught a beaver in a trap, which he nursed back to health and named Rawhide.

Gordon Dallyn, the editor of Canadian Forest and Outdoors, was greatly interested in Belaney's writings and brought him to the attention of James Harkin, the Commissioner of National Parks. In the spring, he received a visit from the Parks Branch publicity director, J.C. Campbell. The Parks Branch then commissioned the first beaver film, The Beaver People, which was shot in the summer of 1930. It featured the two beavers, as well as Anahareo and Belaney, who was identified as Grey Owl. (Note: This film was not shot by W.J. Oliver, nor was it shot in 1928, as some sources state.) In correspondence with his London publisher Country Life, Belaney signed himself "Grey Owl" for the first time in November.

In January, 1931, Belaney, in the persona of Grey Owl, gave a talk at the annual convention of the Canadian Forestry Association in Montreal, where the film was shown in public for the first time. "The event was a huge success. It set the pattern for numerous speeches Grey Owl was to give, dressed in his Indian regalia, with films of his tame beaver to illustrate his stories."

The Parks Branch offered Grey Owl a position as "caretaker of park animals" at the Riding Mountain National Park in Manitoba. Years later James Harkin explained his reasons for the offer: "The providing of a position for Grey Owl was entirely to serve our purpose of securing publicity for the National Parks and for wild life conservation by using Grey Owl's beaver and Grey Owl's personality as a spear-head in that connection."

== Beaver Lodge (1931–1935) ==
In the spring of 1931, Grey Owl and Anahareo, with the beavers, left Quebec, bound for a new life in the west, where a cabin had been built for them on Beaver Lodge Lake.

The friendship between Grey Owl and Bill Oliver began rather awkwardly one June day in 1931. Bill, then working under contract for the Parks Branch, had just lugged his twenty-five kilograms of camera equipment over the five-kilometer forest trail to Grey Owl's cabin northeast of Clear Lake in Riding Mountain National Park. It had been a long haul for the hearty photographer. Just as he put down his heavy load at Beaver Lodge Lake, Grey Owl greeted him with this remark: "So you're the cameraman. I may as well tell you I have not much use for white men." When Bill asked why, his host replied: "I have never had the pleasure of meeting many who did not want to deface God's earth." Only after Grey Owl's death did Bill Oliver realize the irony of the situation. The Indian making these remarks was born and raised in Hastings, Sussex, just fifty kilometers or so from the village of Ash (near Canterbury), Bill's hometown.

— Donald B. Smith. From the Land of Shadows: the Making of Grey Owl.

In June, a second beaver film was produced. This film, The Beaver Family, was shot by the cameraman W. J. Oliver, and released in 1932. Grey Owl would work with W.J. Oliver on more films in the coming years.

Beaver Lodge Lake proved to be unsuitable for the beavers, as a summer drought had resulted in the water becoming stagnant and the risk of the lake freezing to the bottom in winter could not be ignored. The bigger waterways of Prince Albert National Park in Saskatchewan were found to be a better habitat for beaver.

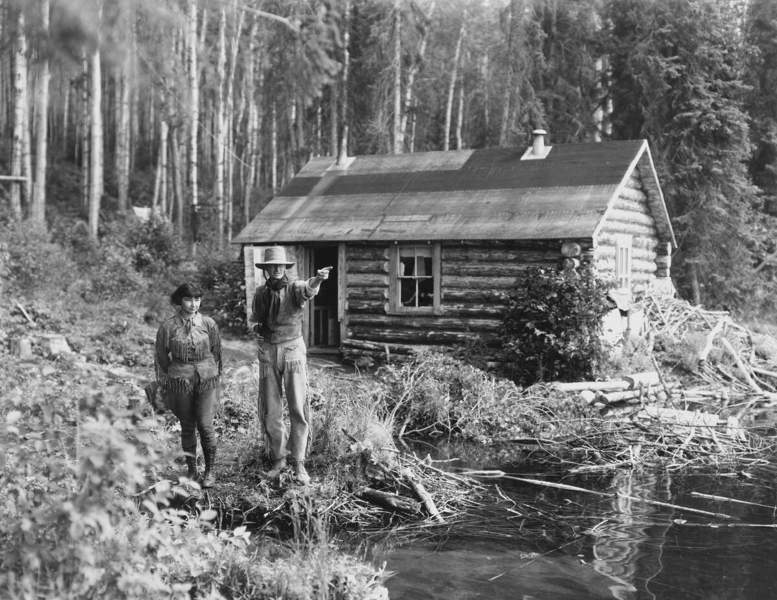
Grey Owl and Anahareo at cabin, Lake Ajawaan, Saskatchewan

In October the group relocated to Lake Ajawaan in the park, which was ideal for their needs, being isolated, heavily wooded and teeming with wildlife. The Superintendent of the Park, Major J.A. Wood, had a cabin built for them according to Grey Owl's specifications. It was known thereafter as Beaver Lodge, and would be Grey Owl's base until his death in 1938. He received many prominent visitors at the lodge, including the Governor-General, John Buchan, 1st Baron Tweedsmuir, an admirer of Grey Owl's writings on wildlife, the poet Charles G. D. Roberts and his son, the writer William Harris Lloyd Roberts.

In late 1931, Grey Owl's first book, on which he had been working for two years, was published under the title The Men of the Last Frontier. Grey Owl intended the title to be "The Vanishing Frontier", but to his chagrin, the publisher, Country Life, changed the title to "The Men of the Last Frontier" without consulting him. (Note: Grey Owl complained to the publisher: That you changed the title shows that you, at least, missed the entire point of the book. You still believe that man as such is pre-eminent, governs the powers of Nature. So he does, to a large extent, in civilization, but not on the Frontier, until that Frontier has been removed. ... I speak of Nature, not men; they are incidental, used to illustrate a point only.)

Among other topics the book describes the plight of the beaver in the face of extensive trapping and raises concerns about the future of the Canadian wilderness and wildlife. The demand for beaver pelts in the 1920s and 30s had increased so much that the beaver was on the verge of extinction in Canada. Trappers, many of them inexperienced, were being drawn to the forests in higher numbers than ever before. Grey Owl argued that the only way to save the animal was to stop the influx of trappers. This was highly unlikely during the Depression, "beavers [being] to the north what gold was to the west". Though the book focusses on the beaver, Grey Owl also used the animal as "...representative not only of all North American Wild Life but of the wilderness itself..."

He believed that Canada's wilderness and vast open spaces, both of which were fast disappearing, were what made it unique in the world. Grey Owl also raised concerns about how the Canadian government and logging industry were working together to exploit the forests and attempt to replace them with "synthetic forests", all the while projecting a false image of forest preservation. (Note: Grey Owl portrayed the situation in the following words: So we have the highly-diverting spectacle of one man, standing in the midst of ten million acres of stumps and arid desolation, planting with a shovel a little tree ten inches high, to be the cornerstone of a new and synthetic forest, urged on to the deed by a deputation of smug and smiling profiteers, who do not really care if the tree matures or not unless their descendants are to be engaged in the lumbering business.)

The winter of 1931–1932 saw Grey Owl at work on the early chapters of Tales of an Empty Cabin, his final book, which would only be published in 1936. Anahareo, pregnant and stuck in the cabin, was fed up, later writing "All I heard from Archie that winter was the scratch, scratch of his pen, and arguments against taking a bath. Like a kid, he loathed baths." On August 23, 1932, their daughter Dawn was born.

At Beaver Lodge, the third beaver film, Strange Doings in Beaverland, was shot by W. J. Oliver in August 1932. The roof of the cabin was temporarily removed to facilitate the filming of some scenes. Oliver returned in 1933 to film the fourth beaver film Grey Owl's Neighbours, which showed Grey Owl interacting with various animals in addition to the beavers. It also showed him welcoming visitors arriving by canoe. Oliver took many photographs of Grey Owl looking "consciously Indian", which were used as publicity for his lecture tours. The photographs were also used as illustrations in Grey Owl's works. In September 1935, Grey Owl and W. J. Oliver collaborated on their final film, Pilgrims of the Wild, which showed Grey Owl and Anahareo together on a canoe trip in the bush.

From 1932 to 1934, Grey Owl worked on the autobiographical novel Pilgrims of the Wild, which was published in early 1935. Later in 1935 he finished the children's adventure story, The Adventures of Sajo and Her Beaver People.

Leaving Dawn with a family in Prince Albert, Anahareo went alone on prospecting trips to the Churchill River area. The first trip was in the summer of 1933. The second trip lasted an entire year, from the summer of 1934 to the summer of 1935, in which she travelled by canoe to Wollaston Lake, 550 kilometers north of Prince Albert, and continued farther north to the edge of the Barren Lands. Grey Owl's letters to her betrayed a mixed bag of emotions: admiration for her fiercely independent spirit and courage in making such an arduous trip alone, concern for her safety, envy that she could make a trip into the bush that poor health and the pressure of writing prevented him from making – also irritation that the endeavor cost more than they could afford.

At Grey Owl's request, Anahareo returned from the prospecting trip in the summer of 1935 to help him prepare for the upcoming lecture tour in Great Britain and to look after the beavers in his absence. She sewed his costume for the tour and later wrote:

Archie brought back five moose-hides and about two pounds of beads, but since every stitch of his outfit had to be hand-sewn, with only three weeks to do it in, I told him that I wouldn't have time for beadwork – and besides all that fancy stuff would make him look sissified. To this he answered, 'Do Indians in full regalia look sissified?' 'No, but a bushman would look funny all decorated up.' 'I agree with you there. But I'm not going as a bushman, I'm going as the Indian they expect me to be.'

== First tour of Great Britain (1935–1936) ==
On October 17, 1935, Grey Owl arrived at Southampton, England on the Empress of Britain from Montreal for the start of his first lecture tour in Great Britain. The tour was organized by his London publisher, Lovat Dickson, who later reported "The crowds everywhere were immense and enthusiastic." So popular were the lectures that the tour, originally planned to end in 1935, was extended for two months into 1936. All told, Grey Owl gave over two hundred lectures and addressed nearly 250,000 people.

His lecture in Hastings was typical of those on the tour, beginning with words of greeting followed by a showing of Pilgrims of the Wild, a film about his life with Anahareo at Beaver Lodge. While the film ran, Grey Owl moved about the stage, telling stories about the wildlife in Canada, particularly about the beaver. "He talked directly to his audience, and used no notes. His animated dialogue and his second, third and fourth films magically transported his listeners from the narrow streets of Hastings to the vast, unbroken Canadian forests."

On February 14, 1936, Grey Owl embarked at Greenock on the Duchess of Bedford, arriving in Halifax on the 21st. In May 1936 Grey Owl wrote to the Manager at White Rock Pavilion, Hastings, asking him to find the address for his aunts. His aunts later said that they had received only about three letters from him after he left for Canada.

== Back to Beaver Lodge (1936–1937) ==
Grey Owl returned to Beaver Lodge after the wildly successful British tour in the late winter of 1936. He continued to work on Tales of an Empty Cabin, which would be published later that year.

He also conceived of a new project: Having seen how much value the beaver films added to his lectures in promoting his ideas, he wanted to take a cameraman with him into the Canadian wilderness to show what it is like to travel in the bush in winter and summer. The films, along with the beaver films, would be shown during his lectures in the upcoming tour.

In March he pitched the idea to the Parks Branch, which had underwritten the five beaver films, and to a number of influential people, including the Prime Minister, Mackenzie King, but his request for funding was turned down. (Note: It is likely that a number of unfortunate incidents of public drunkenness around that time had cost Grey Owl the requested funding. See Alcohol use.) His publishers agreed to put up $2000 for the winter film, while Grey Owl paid the remaining costs of that film and the entire costs of the summer film out of his own pocket, commenting "This picture is the dream of my life, & neither Parks nor financial considerations are to stop me." The summer film was supposed to be shot that year in 1936, but the complications of getting together the equipment, rivermen and a new cameraman (W. J. Oliver, with whom Grey Owl had collaborated on the previous films, not being available) led to it being postponed to the summer of 1937.

The Trail – Men Against the Snow (1937) was shot by B.J. (Bert) Bach in the Abitibi area, Quebec, where Grey Owl spent many winters trapping in the 1920s. (Note: Smith gives the title as "The Trail – Winter". Another version of the film exists, with music and narration added, which was intended for theatrical release.)

The Trail - Men Against the River (1937) was shot by B. J. (Bert) Bach in the Mississagi Forest Reserve, near Biscotasing, where Grey Owl worked for many years as a fire ranger in the 1910s. (Note: Smith gives the title as "The Trail – Summer". The only remaining prints of the film are incomplete, with the entire first half missing.)

In early August 1936, Grey Owl travelled to Fort Carlton, Saskatchewan, where he attended a convention of the Great Plains Indians, commemorating the 60th anniversary of the signing of Treaty 6. He participated in the "huge Indian dance" in "his own particular style" and addressed the assembly with the words: "If there is anything I can do to help your cause, please let me know, I know a number of their important people in Ottawa and I know they will listen to me, again I thank you all." (Note: About Grey Owl's reception at the event Donald B. Smith has the following speculation: If John Tootoosis, and others present at the council, such as Stan Cuthand, suspected that Grey Owl was not exactly what he claimed to be, why did they not expose him? Stan feels that they stayed quiet because they knew that he was on their side. The Indians needed public figures in the dominant society to speak on their behalf. That is what mattered. They agreed with him that the white man was destroying the country and supported his mission to save the environment.)

Grey Owl's tumultuous ten-year relationship with Anahareo suffered a serious rupture in April 1936, and they parted for good later that year, probably in September. (Note: Anahareo herself places the date on November 15 at Beaver Lodge. Dickson provides the same date, probably relying on her account, and states "[I]ce was already forming along the shore." Smith gives the date as sometime in late September. Smith places Grey Owl at the Empire Club in Toronto on November 11, and then has him in Ottawa proposing marriage to Yvonne Perrier on 22 November. At that time, travel between Beaver Lodge and eastern Ontario would have required not less than four days each way, so it is barely possible that he went to Beaver Lodge directly after his appearance in Toronto, said good-bye to Anahareo, and then turned around and travelled back to Ottawa in time to propose to Yvonne on the 22nd, although this sequence of events seems highly improbable.) (Note: Lovat Dickson described their parting in romantic terms: They said their solemn goodbyes then, and each promised to come to the help of the other if the need ever arose. Then, after breakfast, when the canoes were loaded and Pony was in the stern of one with the paddle, she turned the canoe swiftly, looked back once over her shoulder, saw him standing there, and lifted her paddle in salute. Then she turned to face the other shore. She never saw him again. Anahareo's own account of the parting was more down-to-earth: Before leaving, I told Archie, as I always had, that if ever he needed me, to send for me. To this he answered, 'Thanks, kid, I appreciate that very much. And remember this – I won't forget you in my will.' 'Oh, quit talking like that!' I said sharply. 'Why? I'm not going to live forever...' I left Beaver Lodge, for the last time, on November 15, 1936.)

On November 9, Grey Owl spoke at the Toronto Book Fair. The venue was filled to capacity with a crowd of 1,700 people, while 500 were turned away due to lack of space. Donald B. Smith described his reception as follows:

No one equalled Grey Owl for crowd appeal at Canada's first book fair, not C. W. Gordon (Ralph Connor), the best-selling Canadian novelist; not E. J. Pratt, the Canadian poet; not the famous American journalist John Gunther; not Carl Van Doren, the well-known American literary critic. The tall, lean man in buckskins and full headdress stole the show with his stirring talk on the "Unknown Canada".

On November 12, he addressed members and guests of the Empire Club, including many Toronto dignitaries, telling them he wants to "arouse in the Canadian people a sense of responsibility they have for [the] north country and its inhabitants, human and animal".

On December 7, 1936, Grey Owl married Yvonne Perrier, a French Canadian woman he had met in Ottawa in March. They returned to Beaver Lodge on New Year's Day, 1937.

In mid-March, the couple went to Abitibi for the shooting of the winter film. "Yvonne proved the perfect helper for Grey Owl. Quickly she learned to snowshoe and although new to winter travelling, loved it, even the camping out in Abitibi in sub-zero temperatures." Grey Owl was not in such good shape: "[I]n one or two shots he looks as though the work entailed was rather too much for him... By all accounts, Grey Owl was all in at the end of the day."

You see canoes driven at high speed over great lakes whose shores are black with pines; you see dark cavernous forests of huge trees untouched by the hand of man. Men trot over portages under mountainous loads; canoes, inverted on men's shoulders, pass through the wood for all the world like huge running beetles on two legs. You watch while camp is made, discover how we cook and eat in primitive ways. You are made to realize the consummate skill and the unconquerable daring of trained canoemen as they drive their light, frail craft down miles of rapids, each a seething vortex of thundering white water in which canoes reel and plunge and stagger and careen, leaping to the rhythmic throbbing of the drum-fire of the rapids.

— Grey Owl. "Preface to the Special Tour Edition", The Men of the Last Frontier, Tour Edition (1937)

In early June, the couple went to Biscotasing, the start of the two-week canoe trip. Donald B. Smith writes "During the arduous filming that followed on the Mississagi River, one thought sustained Archie. Life on the trail in summer would be immortalized." Despite being exhausted by the end of the trip, Grey Owl put on his own form of war dance in Bisco, which "still lacked rhythm and had no Indian words in it".

In July the Indian Defense League of America invited Grey Owl to participate in the annual border crossing between Niagara Falls, Ontario, and Niagara Falls, New York, as "a naturalist and champion to the beauty of wild life, notably his beloved beaver". For the first time in his life, Grey Owl, supposedly raised in Arizona, stepped onto his "native soil".

== Second tour of Great Britain (1937) ==
Grey Owl arrived in England in late September, 1937, accompanied by his third wife, Yvonne, who proved to be a stabilizing influence. The tour kicked off with several weeks of lectures in London and then went on the road throughout Great Britain from the end of October to mid-December. Donald B. Smith described the second tour as his "Greatest Triumph". (Note: In Donald B. Smith's words: After perfecting his Indian story-teller role during a thirty-year period, he performed superbly. The achievement is all the more remarkable when one considers that he made up his performance as he went along. And yet, in Ken Conibear's words, "each was so different from its predecessor that night after night I abandoned what I had planned to do while he talked and simply sat in the wings and listened, rapt." Each talk had the same elements, "the dry humour, the self-belittlement, the exaggerations necessary to give present impact to distant reality, the glorification of Indians and the Canadian North, and the final plea for understanding and compassion".)

Grey Owl gave a Royal Command Performance at Buckingham Palace on December 10, 1937, attended by King George VI and the young princesses Elizabeth and Margaret. He began with the words "You are tired with years of civilization. I come to offer you – what? A green leaf." Grey Owl was impressed by the King, who struck him as a "keen woodsman". It is reported that, in parting, Grey Owl put out his hand to the King and said "Well, good-bye, Brother, and good luck to you."

Grey Owl visited his aunts in Hastings after his second performance there on 14 December. The tour finished, Grey Owl embarked for New York on December 21.

== North American tour, death and exposure (1938) ==
Grey Owl arrived in New York from Great Britain on New Year's Day, 1938. In the next three months he gave 28 lectures in the United States and visited nine cities in Canada.

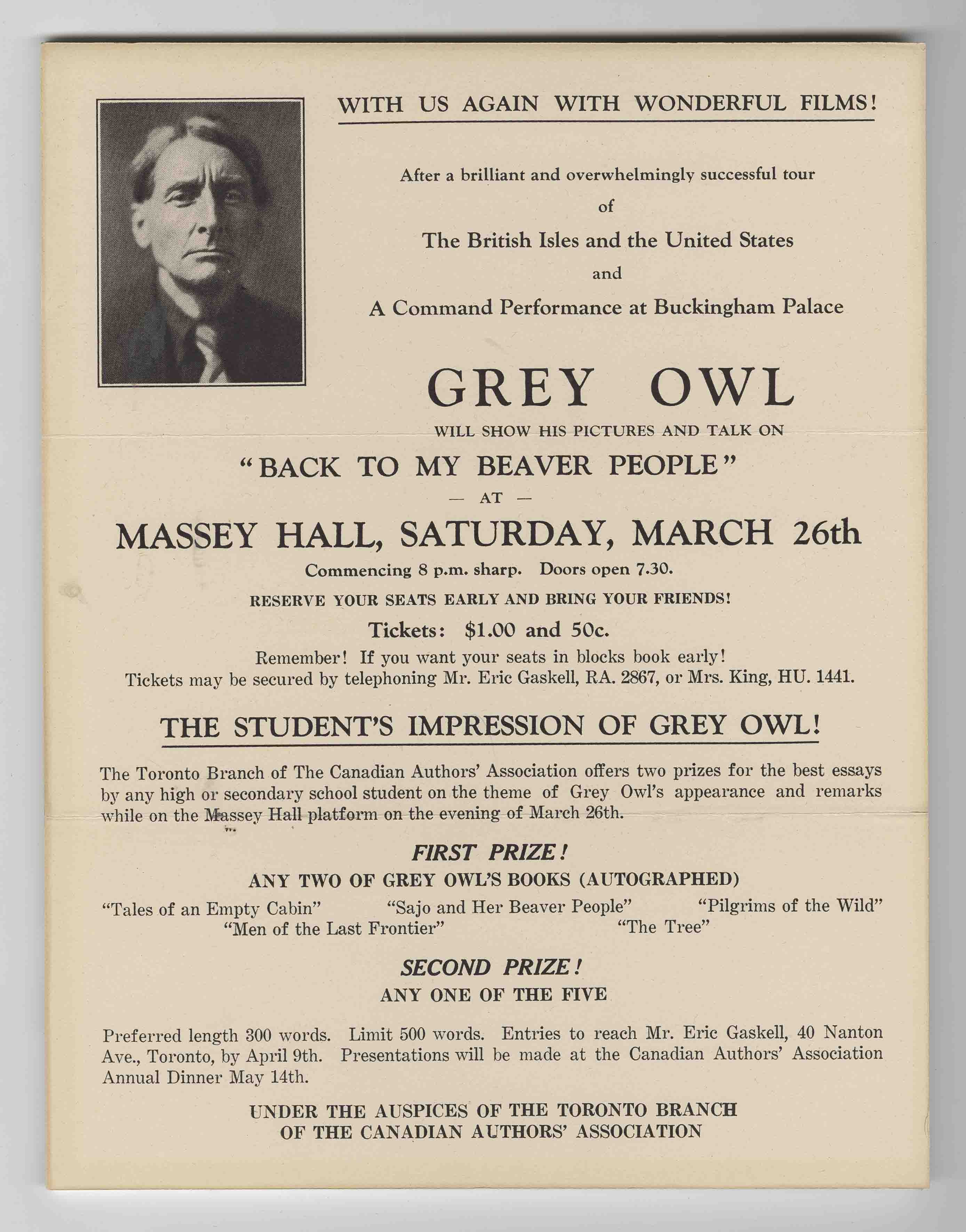
Poster of Grey Owl's talk "Back to my beaver people", Massey Hall, March 26, 1938

On March 26, 1938, Grey Owl appeared at a packed Massey Hall in Toronto. "On that evening nearly three thousand Canadians gave him the greatest ovation of his life."

The frantic pace of the North American tour in early 1938 had taken a heavy toll on Grey Owl's health. To reach the Massey Hall lecture on March 26 in time, he and Yvonne had been on the train for seventeen hours, arriving in Toronto with two hours to spare. He was immediately whisked off for a radio interview. Despite this, he took the stage in the largest concert hall in Canada and gave the performance of his life: "[F]or two hours [he] enchanted everybody. He really was superb." After the lecture they immediately boarded the Canadian Pacific transcontinental train to Regina, where on March 29 he gave the last lecture of his life.

Exhausted and run-down, Grey Owl retreated, alone, to Beaver Lodge on April 7. (Yvonne had to stay in Regina for an operation.) Very ill now, he called for help three days later on April 10. He was transported to hospital in Prince Albert, where he died on April 13 at the age of 49. The park superintendent and friend, Major J.A. Wood, reported "At 8.25 in the morning, he died very quietly, and pictures taken show that the congestion in his lungs [pneumonia] was very slight, which all goes to prove that he had absolutely no resistance whatever." He was buried on the ridge behind Beaver Lodge.

Upon receiving notice of his death on April 13, the North Bay Nugget, which had sat on the story for three years, ran an exposé, contending that Grey Owl was the Englishman Archie Belaney, and did not have a drop of Indian blood in him. Donald B. Smith described the resulting controversy:

After he died on April 13, 1938, a battle waged on both sides of the Atlantic about his origins. Archie Belaney had been so convincing as Grey Owl. After the initial disclosures about his Canadian and English past, neither Major Wood, nor Betty Somervell, nor Lovat Dickson believed the allegations. Lovat Dickson led the fight in Britain, and Major Wood in Canada, to gain acceptance of Grey Owl's own story about his past and to put his valuable work in perspective.

Lovat Dickson spent months after his death trying to disprove the claim that Grey Owl was in fact an Englishman, going so far as to ask Anahareo to England "expressly to meet Mrs. Scott-Brown, Archie's mother, hoping that [Anahareo] would, or could, detect in her a drop of Indian blood. Of course, there wasn't a trace". In the end, Anahareo was forced to accept the truth: "I had the awful feeling for all those years I had been married to a ghost, that the man who now lay buried at Ajawaan was someone I had never known, and that Archie had never really existed."

The story of how a lonely boy playing Indian in the woods behind his house in Hastings transformed himself, first into an accomplished backcountry woodsman and trapper in the Canadian wilderness, and then into the renowned author and lecturer Grey Owl, continued to fascinate and arouse controversy well after his death.

I am an Indian and have spent all my adult life in the woods, yet never have I met one who so sincerely loved and appreciated the wilderness as [Grey Owl] did.

— Anahareo, quoted in Apostate Englishman: Grey Owl the Writer and the Myths

== Posthumous recognition ==
In 1972, the Canadian Broadcasting Corporation broadcast a documentary on Grey Owl, directed by Nancy Ryley.

Grey Owl Junior Public School was built in 1975 for the Scarborough Board of Education (now in Toronto).

In 1999, the film Grey Owl, directed by Richard Attenborough and starring Pierce Brosnan in the title-role, was released.

In June 1997, the mayor of Hastings and the borough's Member of Parliament Michael Foster unveiled a plaque in his honor on the house where he was born at 32 St. James Road, Hastings, East Sussex. A commemorative plaque is on the house at 36 St. Mary's Terrace, where he grew up with his grandmother and aunts.

The Hastings Museum contains an exhibition of memorabilia and a replica of part of his Canadian lakeside cabin.

The ranger station at Hastings Country Park has a commemorative plaque to Grey Owl.

In Riding Mountain National Park, the cabin, where he resided for six months in 1931, is a Federal Heritage Building.

In Prince Albert National Park, the cabin built in the 1930s according to his specifications still stands and is open to visitors.

== Appendices ==
=== Grey Owl's works ===
Books

- The Men of the Last Frontier (1931)
- Private Interest vs. The People (1934) (Note: This is a manuscript written in 1934 and posthumously published in 2025.)
- Pilgrims of the Wild (1934)
- The Adventures of Sajo and Her Beaver People (1935)
- Tales of an Empty Cabin (1936)
- The Tree (1937) (Note: This is a chapter from Tales of an Empty Cabin that was published as a separate volume.)

Articles and short pieces

- "The Passing of the Last Frontier" (1929)
- "The Vanishing Life of the Wild" (1930)
- "Little Brethren of the Wilderness" (1930)
- "The Fine Art of the Still Hunt" (1930)
- "King of the Beaver People" (1930)
- "Who Will Repay?" (1931)
- "A Day in a ... Hidden Town" (1931)
- "More about "Game Leaks." The Indian’s Side of the Question" (1931)
- "A Mess of Pottage" (1931)
- "Comments on Mr. Godsell’s Article by Grey Owl" (1931)
- "White Water!" (1931)
- "Little Indians" (1931)
- "The Perils of Woods Travel" (1931)
- "Indian Legends and Lore" (1931)
- "And a Little Child Shall Lead Them" (1931)
- "A Philosophy of the Wild" (1931)
- "Unto ... the Least of These" (1932)
- "Secrets of the Beaver Family" (1932)
- "Re-builder of the Wilderness" (1932)
- "The Beaver Family Migrates" (1933)
- "The Beaver Babies" (1934)
- "A Description of the Fall Activities of Beaver" (1935)
- "Getting Lost in the Woods" (1935)
- "The Indian’s Code of the Wild" (1935)
- "Author’s Special Preface to his English Readers" (1935)
- "The Fine Art of the Still Hunt" (1935)
- "Introduction to The Great Trek" (1936)
- "Grey Owl Speaks his Mind" (1936)
- "A Plea for the Canadian Northland" (1936)
- "Preface to Special Tour Edition" (1937)
- "Grey Owl’s Farewell to the Children of The British Isles" (1937)
- "Grey Owl Pleads for Wild Life" (1938)
- "My Mission to My Country" (1938)
- "A Message from Grey Owl" (1938)

=== Alcohol use ===
Belaney started drinking when he arrived in Canada as a young man. "At some point during his first years in Temagami, he also discovered alcohol. Years later he said that 'he wished all liquor tasted like ginger ale so he could enjoy the taste as well as the effect.' He drank for the effect." He was a lifelong drinker. "If one accepts alcoholism as 'recurring trouble, problems or difficulties associating with drinking,' Archie by 1930 had become an alcoholic." His favorite drink, according to Anahareo, was "Johnny Dewar's Extra Special". He would also drink vanilla extract and occasionally make his own moonshine.

At the end of the 1935 British tour, "Anxious to ease the pressure of the hectic, stressful last four months, Grey Owl now wanted to drink heavily." His companion on the ship back to Canada, Betty Summervell, noticed that he smelled of onion and "...thought the onion smell came from an Indian cure he was taking for his sickness". In fact, he had on board "...a number of bottles of whisky, which he hid under his bunk. He drank whenever she left the cabin. Just before she returned he chewed a raw onion to banish the whisky smell. After three days of neither eating nor sleeping, the intoxicated Grey Owl looked like a ghost."

Excessive alcohol consumption compromised Grey Owl's position with the Dominion Parks Branch in Ottawa. The photographer Yousuf Karsh had organised a dinner in his honour, at which he was supposed to meet a group of important governmental officials. However, as the dinner began, Grey Owl was absent. Karsh later found him "raising a drunken row in the bar". James Harkin (the head of Parks Branch) was forced to defend Grey Owl, writing to the government's Assistant Deputy Minister "I am sorry to hear that Grey Owl has been indulging too freely in liquor. As a matter of fact, with so much Indian blood in his veins I suppose that it is inevitable that from time to time he will break out in this connection."

=== Grey Owl's names ===
Belaney had a number of names in his life:

- Archibald Stansfeld Belaney. This was his full, legal name. He disliked "Archibald" and preferred to be called "Archie Belaney". Even after adopting the pen name "Grey Owl", he continued to use this name for legal purposes, such as employment. (Note: The possession of a Christian name does not by itself argue against Belaney's claim that he was Indigenous. Every Canadian citizen needs a name in the conventional "given name/surname" format, usually completely or partially Christian. The Indian Act forced Indigenous people to adopt made-up names to function in Canadian society: Traditionally, First Nations people had neither a Christian name nor a surname – they had hereditary names, spirit names, family names, clan names, animal names or nicknames to name but a few.... Traditional naming practices did not make sense to the Indian agents, charged with recording the names of all people living on reserves.... [G]enerally the agents assigned each man a Christian name and more often than not, a non-native surname. Women were given Christian names and assigned the surname of their fathers or husbands. Belaney's first wife's name was "Angele Egwuna" (a combination of Christian given name and traditional surname), while Anahareo had the completely Christian name "Gertrude Bernard". Thus there would be nothing remarkable in a Canadian Indian having a completely Christian name such as "Archie Belaney" as well as a traditional animal name.)
- Grey Owl. Belaney started using this as a pen and stage name in the 1930s and it is under this name that he is commonly known to the public.
- Wa-sha-quon-asin. Belaney used this pen name as well as "Grey Owl" in the title pages of his books. According to one source, the word "Wa-sha-quon-asie" (ending in "e" not "n") means "white beak owl" in Ojibwe and is used to denote the screech owl, not the grey owl. Another source claims the word is "Ojibwa Indian (simplified)" for "wenjiganooshiinh" and means "'great horned owl' or 'great grey owl'". (Note: In Grey Owl's last book, Tales of an Empty Cabin, a footnote in the text translates the word as "He Who Walks By Night".)
- Archie Grey Owl. Belaney made some abortive attempts to avoid his legal surname by enlisting "Grey Owl" in that role. He tried to use this name in his Record of Employment at Prince Albert National Park. According to Smith, "The civil service, however, continued unimaginatively to address him in all correspondence as 'A. Bellaney'. At least they spelt his name incorrectly."
- Archie McNeil. Belaney married his third wife, Yvonne Perrier, under this name, fearing a charge of bigamy due to his undissolved marriage with his first wife. In an elaborate fiction about his past, Belaney told Yvonne his father was a George McNeil, who was third generation Scottish in the United States. His will was also drawn up in the name of "Archie McNeil, familiarly known as Grey Owl".
- Ko-hom-see. This name was a nickname given to Belaney by his first wife's family and means, according to one source, "Little Owl". The family regarded him as "the young owl who sits taking everything in".
- Anaquoness. This is a nickname that Belaney got during his time in Biscotasing due to the unusual Mexican sombrero he wore there. He translated the Ojibwe word as "Little Hat".

=== Relationships with women ===
Belaney had known relationships with five women and fathered four known children:

- Angele Egwuna, married 1910 in Canada. Daughters Agnes Belaney, born 1911, Flora Belaney, born 1926.
- Marie Girard, relationship from 1912 to 1915 in Canada. Son Johnny Jero, born 1915.
- Ivy Holmes, married 1917 in England. Divorced 1922.
- Gertrude Bernard (Anahareo), relationship from 1925 to 1936 in Canada. Daughter Shirley Dawn, born 1932. (Note: Anahareo gave birth to a second daughter, Ann, in June, 1937, approximately nine months after the last documented time she and Belaney were together. The father's name did not appear on the birth certificate and she never publicly claimed the father was Belaney.)
- Yvonne Perrier, married 1936 in Canada. (Belaney was married under the name "McNeil", due to his undissolved marriage with Angele Egwuna.)

== See also ==
- Bill Guppy
- Passing as Indigenous Americans
- Pretendian
