= The Men of the Last Frontier =

1931 book by Grey Owl

- First edition cover
- Author: Grey Owl
- Illustrator: Grey Owl
- Language: English
- Genre: Essays
- Publisher: Country Life Limited
- Publication date: 1931
- Publication place: Canada
- Media type: Print
- Pages: 253

The Men of the Last Frontier is a collection of essays, written and illustrated by the Canadian author Grey Owl (1888–1938). It was published in 1931 in Great Britain by Country Life Limited.

== Contents ==
The Men of the Last Frontier consists of ten essays on a variety of subjects related to the Canadian North, in which Grey Owl expressed his concerns about the future of the Canadian wilderness and wildlife, particularly the plight of the beaver in the face of extensive trapping and loss of habitat.

== Writing the book ==
Grey Owl began writing The Men of the Last Frontier, his first book, in late 1929 in the area of Cabano in southeastern Quebec, where he and his companion, Anahareo, had been living since the previous year. Except for his adopted beaver Rawhide, he was alone there, Anahareo having left to work a mining claim in northern Quebec.

According to the account in Pilgrims of the Wild, Grey Owl found it difficult to start writing, and decided to return to the cabin on Birch Lake, where he, Anahareo and the beavers McGinnis and McGinty had first settled when they came to the area. (Note: That some such event took place during this time period is credible, but unsubstantiated. Pilgrims of the Wild is not strictly autobiographical and contains stories about Grey Owl's life that have been established as fictional.) He describes his feelings after arriving at the empty cabin: "And I took my old place sadly on the bench and wished I had not come. And as I sat in reverie it fell to dusk." He continued:

And quite suddenly the place that had seemed to be so lonely and deserted was now no longer empty, but all at once was filled with living memories and ghosts from out the past. And then I made a light, and here amongst the wraiths began to write.

In two nights, two chapters of "The Vanishing Frontier" were finished, "The Tale of the Beaver People", and "The House of McGinnis". I made out in my writing that our lost friends still were living, and hoped my readers would forgive me the deception, if it was one, which neither they nor I will ever know.

And they lived again in those few pages if no where else.

For a week I wrote furiously, while ever in my ears was the soft laughter of a woman, and the sound of small voices that were so much like the voices of little children.

== Relationship with Country Life ==
Grey Owl had a fraught relationship with the London publisher of The Men of the Last Frontier, Country Life, and eventually decided to take his future writing to the newly formed publishing house Lovat Dickson & Thompson Limited.

Country Life initially wanted to buy The Men of the Last Frontier outright and offered Grey Owl $750 for all rights. Although he was inexperienced in the publishing business, Grey Owl was suspicious of a deal that gave him no royalties and turned to the Canadian Department of the Interior for advice. The free-lance writer Lloyd Roberts happened to hear of this and intervened on Grey Owl's behalf to negotiate a fairer contract for the book.

Grey Owl wanted the title of the book to be The Vanishing Frontier, but, to his chagrin, Country Life, changed the title to The Men of the Last Frontier without consulting him. He complained to the publisher:

That you changed the title shows that you, at least, missed the entire point of the book. You still believe that man as such is pre-eminent, governs the powers of Nature. So he does, to a large extent, in civilization, but not on the Frontier, until that Frontier has been removed. ... I speak of Nature, not men; they are incidental, used to illustrate a point only.

Grey Owl was also adamant that the book be published without editorial changes, in particular, that all grammatical mistakes be left in place. The editors at Country Life ignored his wish, much to Grey Owl's irritation.

== Illustrations and photos ==
The book contains a sketch of frontier clothing by Grey Owl and a number of photos, including one by the noted photographer, W.J. Oliver.

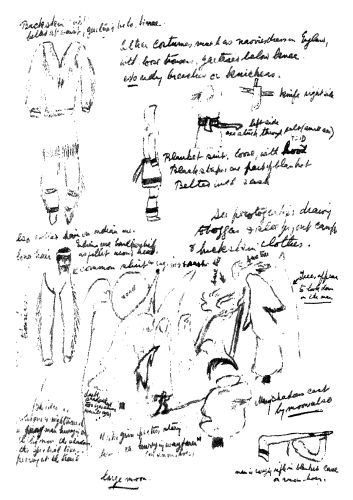

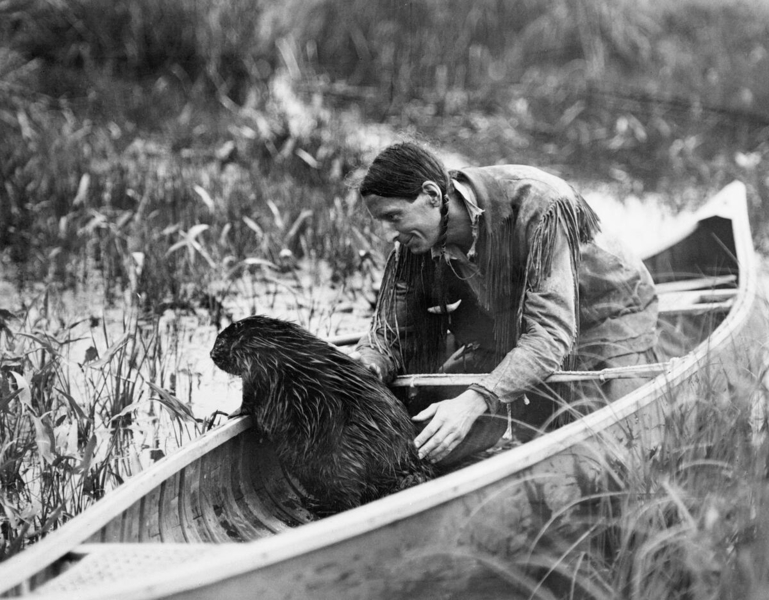
