= The Adventures of Sajo and Her Beaver People =

1935 children's adventure novel by Grey Owl

- First edition cover
- Author: Archibald Stansfeld Belaney
- Illustrator: Archibald Stansfeld Belaney
- Language: English
- Genre: Children's literature Adventure fiction
- Publisher: Lovat Dickson & Thompson Limited
- Publication date: 1935
- Publication place: Great Britain
- Media type: Print
- Pages: 256

The Adventures of Sajo and her Beaver People is a children's adventure novel, written and illustrated by the English-born Canadian trapper-turned-conservationist Archibald Stansfeld Belaney under the name Grey Owl. It was based on his experience of raising two beaver kits with his First Nations wife Anahareo. The novel was first published in 1935 in Great Britain by Lovat Dickson & Thompson Limited. With the title Sajo and the Beaver People it was published by Macmillan of Canada in the same year. Publication with the same title by Charles Scribner's Sons in the United States followed in 1936. The book has been translated into many languages.

== Plot ==
Sajo, a young Indian girl, and her older brother, Shapian, adopt two orphaned beaver kits, Chilawee and Chikanee. The children have lost their mother, and the father, Big Feather, must leave them for a time to pay off a debt to the "Company" by working in a "canoe brigade". With no money to support them while he is away, he trades Chikanee for provisions. The beaver is then sold to an amusement park in the city.

Distraught, the children decide to travel to the city with Chilawee and try to rescue Chikanee. They first travel by canoe through a terrifying forest fire to Rabbit Portage, a frontier town on the railroad. There they are befriended by a missionary, who is presented as a "white brother to the Indians". He takes up a collection among the tourists and residents of the town to raise money for their train tickets. Arriving in the city, they encounter Pat O'Reilly, an Irish policeman, who helps them locate Chikanee and persuade the park owner to release the beaver to them. To their great joy, Chilawee and Chikanee were reunited: "And there, before all those people, they began to wrestle."

== Illustrations ==
The book contains illustrations by Grey Owl, among them the following:

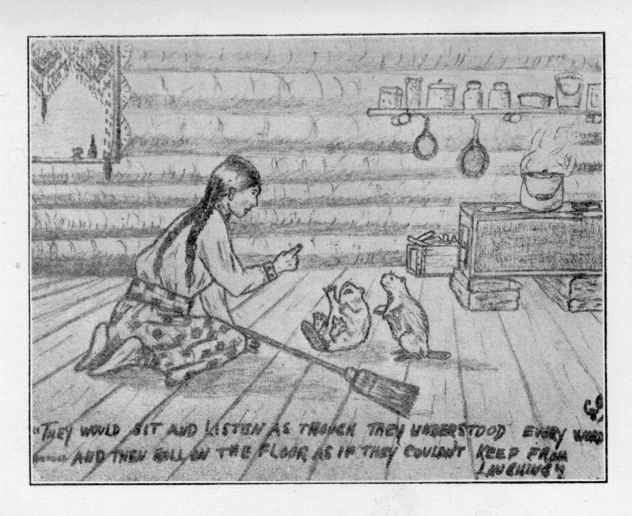

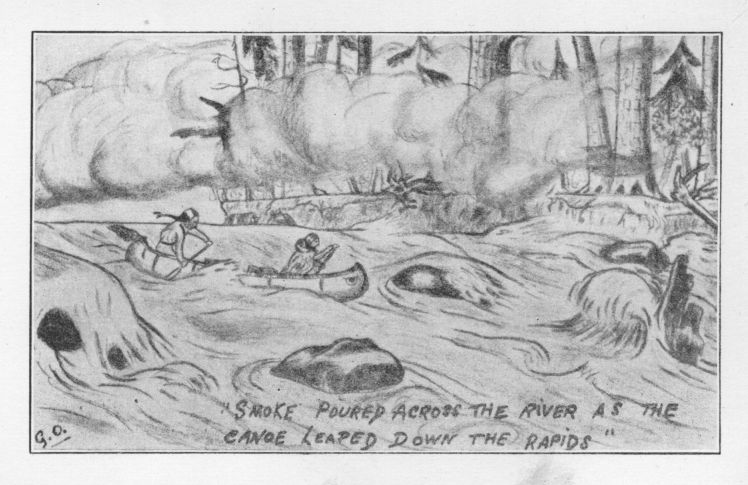

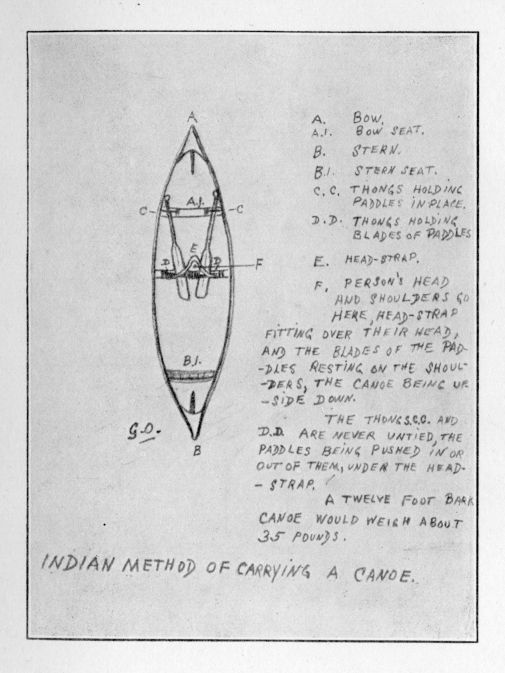

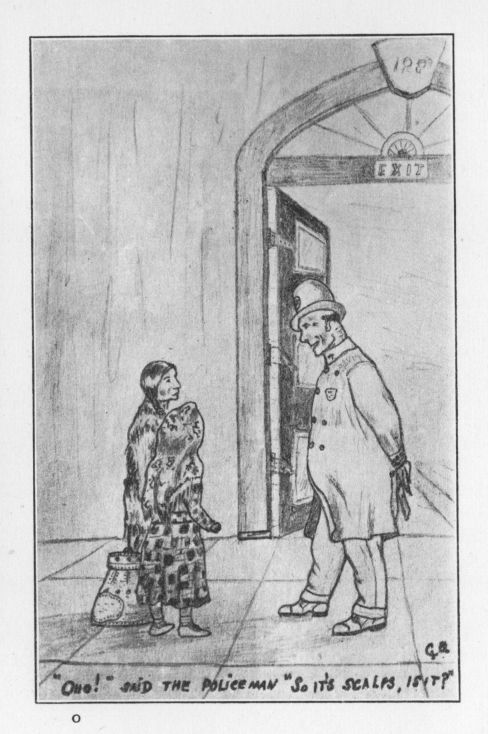

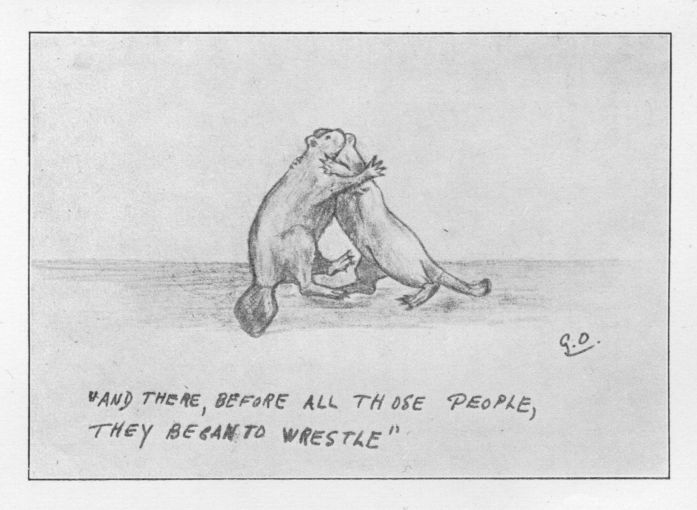

== See also ==
- Grey Owl
