= Lloyd Roberts =

Lloyd Roberts may refer to:

- Mooseman (Lloyd Roberts, 1962–2001), American bassist
- Loyd Roberts (1907–1989), college football and basketball player and coach
- Lloyd Roberts (politician) (1907–1961), Australian politician
- William Harris Lloyd Roberts (1884–1966), Canadian writer, poet, and playwright
