= Grey Owl (film) =

- UK theatrical release poster
- Directed by: Richard Attenborough
- Written by: William Nicholson
- Produced by: Richard Attenborough; Jake Eberts; Claude Léger
- Starring: Pierce Brosnan; Annie Galipeau
- Cinematography: Roger Pratt
- Edited by: Lesley Walker
- Music by: George Fenton
- Production companies: Largo Entertainment; Allied Filmmakers
- Distributed by: 20th Century Fox (United Kingdom, Ireland, France, Germany and Sweden); Remstar Distribution (Canada); New City Releasing (United States); Summit Entertainment (International)
- Release dates: 10 September 1999 (Spain); 1 October 1999 (Canada); 3 November 2000 (UK)
- Running time: 117 minutes
- Countries: United Kingdom; Canada; United States
- Language: English
- Budget: $30 million
- Box office: $632,617

Grey Owl is a 1999 biographical film directed by Richard Attenborough and starring Pierce Brosnan in the title-role of the real-life British schoolboy turned Native American trapper Archibald Belaney, known as "Grey Owl", and Annie Galipeau as his wife Anahareo, with brief appearances by Graham Greene and others. The screenplay was written by William Nicholson. The film was released on 10 September 1999 in Spain and 15 February 2000 in US. It was the last film made by Largo Entertainment before it went defunct in 1999.

== Plot ==
Archibald Belaney from England grows up fascinated with Native American culture—so much so that, in the early 1900s, he leaves the United Kingdom for Canada, where he gradually reinvents himself as trapper Archie Grey Owl, and pretends to have Native American ancestry. Influenced by his new wife, Anahareo, Belaney renounces trapping and hunting, and becomes a noted conservationist.

== Cast ==
- Pierce Brosnan as Archibald "Grey Owl" Belaney
- Annie Galipeau as Anahareo
- Nathaniel Arcand as Ned White Bear
- Vlasta Vrána as Harry Champlin
- David Fox as Jim Wood
- Charles Powell as Walter Perry
- Stephanie Cole as Ada Belaney
- Renée Asherson as Carrie Belaney
- Stewart Bick as Cyrrus Finney
- Jacques Lussier as Hotel Manager
- Jimmy Herman as Chief Pete Misebi
- Graham Greene as Jim Bernard
- Saginaw Grant as Pow Wow Chief

== Production ==
The film was shot in the English town of Hastings, Quebec towns Chelsea and Wakefield, Jacques Cartier Park and Saskatchewan's Prince Albert National Park.

Director Richard Attenborough said in an interview that he and his brother, noted presenter and naturalist David Attenborough, had attended "Grey Owl's" De Montfort Hall, Leicester lecture in 1936, depicted in the film, and been influenced by his advocacy of conservation. The Northern Cree Singers contributed music and are also featured in the film.

Canadian naturalist and canoe tripper Hap Wilson taught Pierce Brosnan how to throw an axe and paddle a canoe for his role.

== Release ==
The film opened 1 October 1999 on 70 screens in Canada.

The film premiered on video in the United States on 15 February 2000. It eventually opened on 3 November 2000 in the United Kingdom.

=== Critical reception ===
The film was met with negative reviews. It has a 17% approval rating on review aggregator Rotten Tomatoes based on 12 reviews, with an average rating of 4.6/10. William Gallagher of the BBC said, "if you like cuddly animals or you fancy Pierce Brosnan, you're in luck".

The film won one Genie Award at the 20th Genie Awards, in the category of Best Costume Design for Renée April.

=== Box office ===
Grey Owl flopped at the box office upon its limited release grossing $162,360 in its opening weekend in Canada and a total of $632,617 against its $30 million budget.
