= Pilgrims of the Wild =

1935 autobiographical novel by Grey Owl

- First edition cover
- Author: Grey Owl
- Illustrator: Grey Owl
- Language: English
- Genre: Autobiographical novel
- Publisher: Macmillan of Canada
- Publication date: 1934
- Publication place: Canada
- Media type: Print
- Pages: 282

Pilgrims of the Wild is an autobiographical novel, written and illustrated by the Canadian author Grey Owl, also known as Archibald Stansfeld Belaney (1888–1938). It was published in late 1934 by Macmillan of Canada and then in early 1935 by Lovat Dickson & Thompson Limited in Great Britain. In the United States Charles Scribner’s Sons also brought out its own edition in 1935. The book tells the story of an Indigenous man's transformation from a backcountry trapper into a successful author and conservationist.

== Authorship ==
The book's preface gives the author and location as

WA-SHA-QUON-ASIN (GREY OWL)

BEAVER LODGE, PRINCE ALBERT NATIONAL PARK, SASKATCHEWAN

The book is presented as the autobiography of an Indigenous man, and while it does depict episodes in Grey Owl's life, it contains many fictional elements, foremost among them the fabrication that the man is not an Englishman. (Note: Grey Owl's biographer, Donald B. Smith, describes the book as an autobiography, but recognizes its fictional elements. For example, about a supposed incident that led to the death of the beaver Jelly Roll, he notes "In Pilgrims [Grey Owl] tells a different version of the same story... It was all fiction.")

The protagonist is never referred to as "Grey Owl" in the story, nor is Grey Owl's claim that he was the son of a Scottish man and an Apache woman ever mentioned. The only references to Grey Owl occur in the title page and the preface, identifying him as the author of the book.

== Publication ==
Excerpts from the book were first serialized in the Illustrated London News in August and September 1934. In early 1935, the book was published in Great Britain by Lovat Dickson & Thompson Limited, in Canada by Macmillan of Canada and in the United States by Charles Scribner's Sons. Grey Owl promoted the book as part of a four-month lecture tour in England, where he also showed his films about beavers.

== Plot ==
A young man, making his living in northern Ontario and Quebec as a trapper in winter and a forest ranger and guide in summer, meets a young woman at a resort where the man is working as a guide. They fall in love and get married. The man, referred to once in the story as "Archie", is half-Indian of unexplained parentage. The woman, Gertrude, is a descendant of Iroquois chiefs, and in the story goes by her tribal name "Anahareo".

They go into the bush together to earn money on the trap line, but face severe problems due to the scarcity of fur-bearing animals in the area, which has been brought about by irresponsible trapping. Partly due to Anahareo's influence, Archie becomes disillusioned with trapping. The last straw comes when he kills a mother beaver, leaving two kits motherless. He decides to give up trapping for good. The couple adopts the beaver kits, eventually naming them McGinnis and McGinty.

Lured by stories of abundant wildlife and bush, Archie and Anahareo, along with the adopted beavers, move to southeastern Quebec, where they intend to start a beaver colony. Arriving in Cabano they settle in the area of Lake Touladi and build a cabin on Birch Lake. The area is heavily logged and depopulated of wildlife, particularly beaver, and their dreams of founding a beaver colony begin to fade. A further disappointment occurs when the beavers disappear. They adopt a new beaver kit and name it "Jelly Roll".

With Anahareo's encouragement, Archie starts writing and succeeds in getting an article published in the English magazine Country Life. His first article in Canada, entitled "The Vanishing Life of the Wild" is also published in the periodical Canadian Forest and Outdoors. Country Life now requests a full book from him.

The family moves for a time to an English-speaking resort on the south shore of the St. Lawrence, known as Metis Beach, where Archie gives his first lecture.

Having earned some money by lecturing in Metis, they move back to Cabano, but Anahareo soon leaves with their friend, David White Stone, to work his mining claim in northern Quebec. Archie stays in the area and starts the slow work of writing the book he promised, while also continuing to search for McGinnis and McGinty. He rescues an injured beaver and adopts it, naming it "Rawhide".

Through his writings, Archie attracts the interest of the National Park Service, which commissions the film The Beaver People, featuring the two beavers, Jelly Roll and Rawhide, as well as Anahareo and Archie themselves. Archie accepts a job with the Parks Service at a regular salary, allowing him to pursue his interest in conservationism. The book, on which he has been working so long, is finally published. He intends the title to be The Vanishing Frontier, but the publisher changes it to The Men of the Last Frontier (which is the title of Grey Owl's first book).

== Major themes ==
Like Grey Owl's other writings, a central theme of the book is respect for the natural world. In particular, Pilgrims of the Wild is meant to show how domestic life can co-exist with the wilderness.

== Illustrations ==
The book contains illustrations by Grey Owl, among them the following:

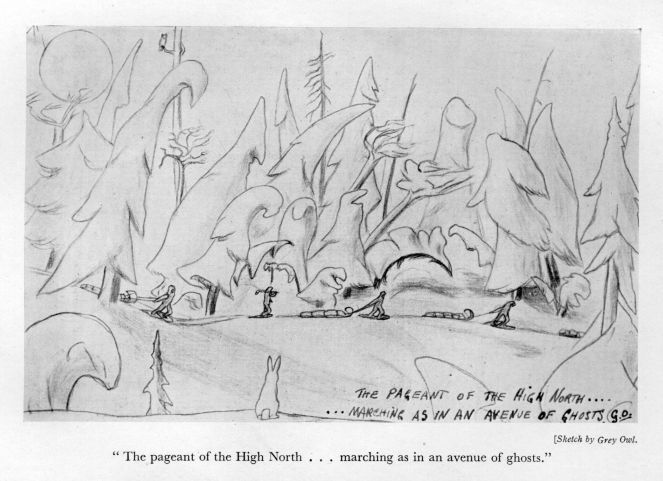

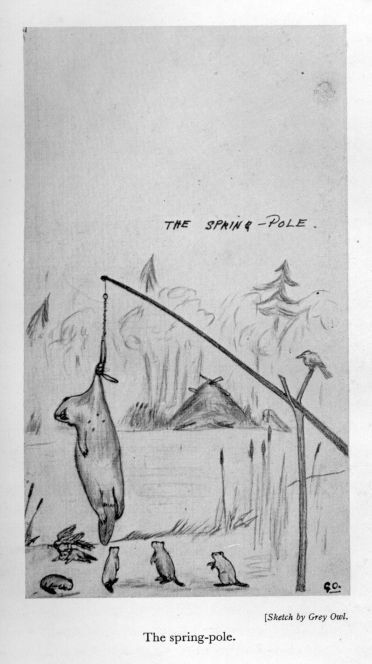

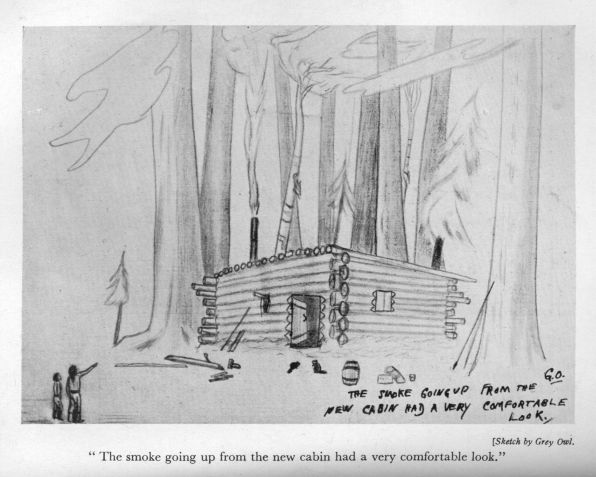

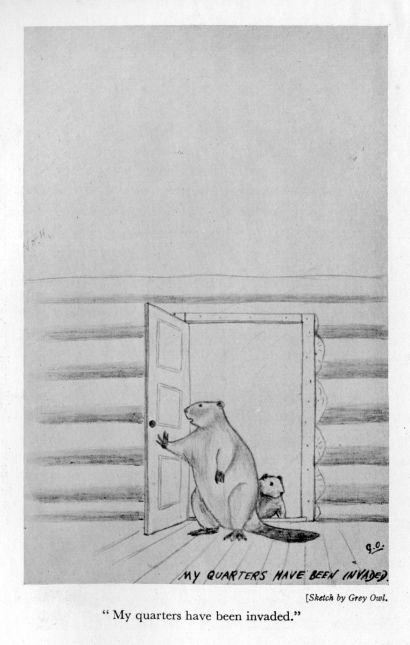

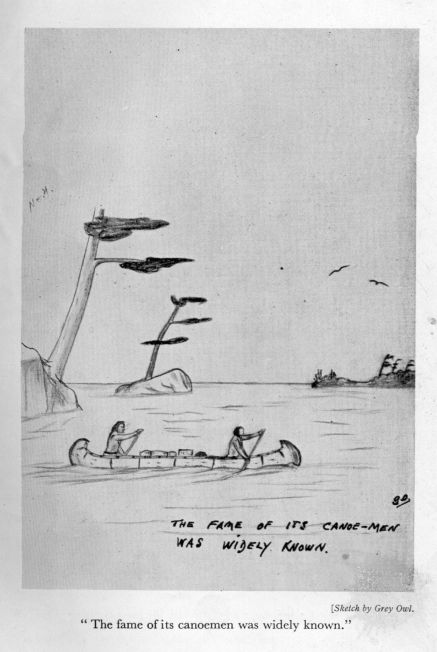
