= Tales of an Empty Cabin =

1936 collection of essays and short stories by Grey Owl

- First edition cover
- Author: Grey Owl
- Illustrator: Grey Owl
- Language: English
- Genre: Essay, Short Story
- Publisher: Lovat Dickson & Thompson Limited
- Publication date: 1936
- Publication place: Canada
- Media type: Print
- Pages: 335

Tales of an Empty Cabin is a collection of essays and short stories, written by the Canadian author Grey Owl (1888–1938). It was published in 1936 in Great Britain by Lovat Dickson & Thompson Limited and in Canada by Macmillan of Canada. Publications by other publishing houses, such as Dodd, Mead & Co. in the United States, followed.

== Contents ==
Tales of an Empty Cabin consists of three books: "Book One: Tales of the Canadian Northland" contains stories of the Canadian North, including an extended story, "The Tree", about the life of a jack-pine. "Book Two: Mississauga" recounts stories based on Grey Owl's experiences as a forest ranger in the Mississagi Forest Reserve. "Book Three: Ajawaan" consists of essays about the animals that Grey Owl observed and befriended in his position as "caretaker of park animals" in Prince Albert National Park.

In Tales of an Empty Cabin Grey Owl expressed his concerns about the future of the Canadian wilderness and wildlife. His feelings are epitomized by the following statement in the preface:

The Wilderness should now no longer be considered as a playground for vandals, or a rich treasure trove to be ruthlessly exploited for the personal gain of the few—to be grabbed off by whoever happens to get there first. Man should enter the woods, not with any conquistador obsession or mighty hunter complex, neither in a spirit of braggadocio, but rather with the awe, and not a little of the veneration, of one who steps within the portals of some vast and ancient edifice of wondrous architecture.

== See also ==
- Grey Owl
