= Bill Guppy =

Canadian woodsman (1875–1943)

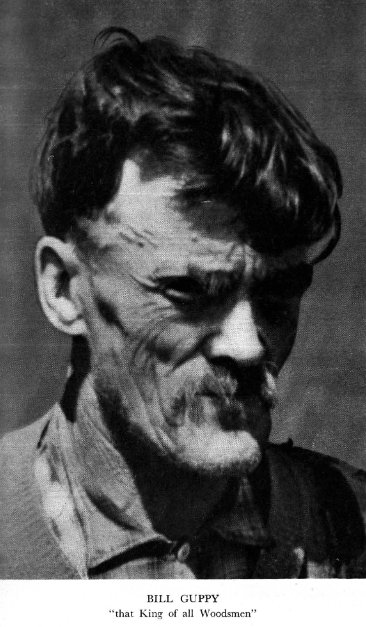
- Born: William Henry Guppy; September 13, 1875; Pembroke, Ontario, Canada
- Died: May 23, 1943 (aged 67); Niagara Falls, Ontario, Canada
- Occupation: Woodsman
- Spouse: Eva Free

William Henry "Bill" Guppy (September 13, 1875 – May 23, 1943) was a noted Canadian woodsman. Born to parents from England in Pembroke, Ontario, he spent most of his life in the Lake Temiskaming, Lake Temagami and Lake Abitibi regions of northeastern Ontario and northwestern Quebec. He is reputed to have been associated with the popular writer and conservationist Grey Owl during his first year in Canada. (Note: Aside from a few official records, the only published source of information about Guppy's life is the book Bill Guppy: King of the Woodsmen, Life-Long Friend and Tutor of "Grey Owl", written by Hal Pink, the pen-name of Harry Leigh Pink, who was an obscure English writer of pulp fiction. This book was his only foray outside of fiction and soon after its publication he gave up writing to pursue a career in the Anglican church. The book itself consists of anecdotes Guppy related to Pink about his life and the people he knew. Given that Guppy and Pink are both story tellers, it is likely the account contains fictional elements and cannot be assumed to be factual in all respects.)

== Occupations ==
According to the writer Hal Pink in his book Bill Guppy: King of the Woodsmen, Guppy pursued a variety of occupations throughout his life:

[H]e set out alone to earn his living as a boy fur-buyer at the age of fourteen, during half a century in the Northern Wild he had been in turn Indian trader, trapper, hunter, teamster, lumberjack, fire ranger, prospector, dog-driver, mail-runner, hunting guide, canoeman, packer, storekeeper, bush postmaster, and professional builder of log cabins.

Giving his occupation as "Bushman", Guppy enlisted with the Canadian Overseas Expeditionary Force on April 25, 1916, and served on the front line in the First World War.

Guppy worked as a carpenter on the 1930 film The Silent Enemy, which was shot on location in Temagami.

== Association with Grey Owl ==
According to Hal Pink's account in Bill Guppy: King of the Woodsmen, Guppy and Archie Belaney met by chance in Timiskaming in the fall of 1906. (This was many years before Belaney began to be known as "Grey Owl".) Belaney had just arrived from Toronto, eager to begin the new life in the Canadian back-country that he had imagined as a boy growing up in Hastings, England. Liking the young Englishman and admiring his pluck, Guppy invited him to live with his family and start learning the basic skills needed for life in the bush: traveling by canoe and snowshoes through the lakes and forests, trapping, hunting and axe craft, among others. He also taught Belaney some words of Ojibwe and shared his first-hand knowledge of Indigenous religion and customs. Belaney accompanied Guppy and his brothers to Lake Temagami in the spring of 1907, where the Guppys worked as guides and he worked as a "chore-boy" at the Temagami Inn on Temagami Island. Their close association ended in the fall when Guppy returned to Timiskaming while Belaney chose to remain in Temagami. (Note: The lack of corroborating evidence for Pink's account, as well as issues with the portrayal of historical facts and internal coherence of the story, is the subject of the article "The Myth of Bill Guppy", published in the journal Ontario History.)

Even after Belaney's death in 1938 and exposure as an Englishman, with no Indigenous ancestry, Guppy retained a favourable opinion of him, as reported by Pink:

And let me say this. If any man well deserved his success, it was Grey Owl. He had lived through it all - the hardship, the terrible cold, the scorching fire, the hunger of the meatless trail, the sweaty toil of the portage, the crossing of thin ice, soaking in snow water, pain of frost-bitten limbs, the toilsome life of the canoe and the paddle, the axe and the tumpline, the empty stomach and the smoky tea - lived through every inch of it for a quarter of a century before ever he spoke of it or wrote it down.

The North lost a good woodsman, one of its very best, when he passed on. And more men of the Grey Owl stamp are needed, urgently needed, if the animals, the birds, and the forests themselves are to be saved from destruction by commercial interests, by lumber companies who in these money-first-no-sentiment-in-business days would slash the heart out of every beauty spot between here and Hudson Bay.

According to Pink, Grey Owl also had a great respect for Bill Guppy and called him the "king of all woodsmen".

== See also ==
- Grey Owl
