= Florence Ivy Mary Holmes =

English wife of Archibald Stansfeld Belaney, known as 'Grey Owl'

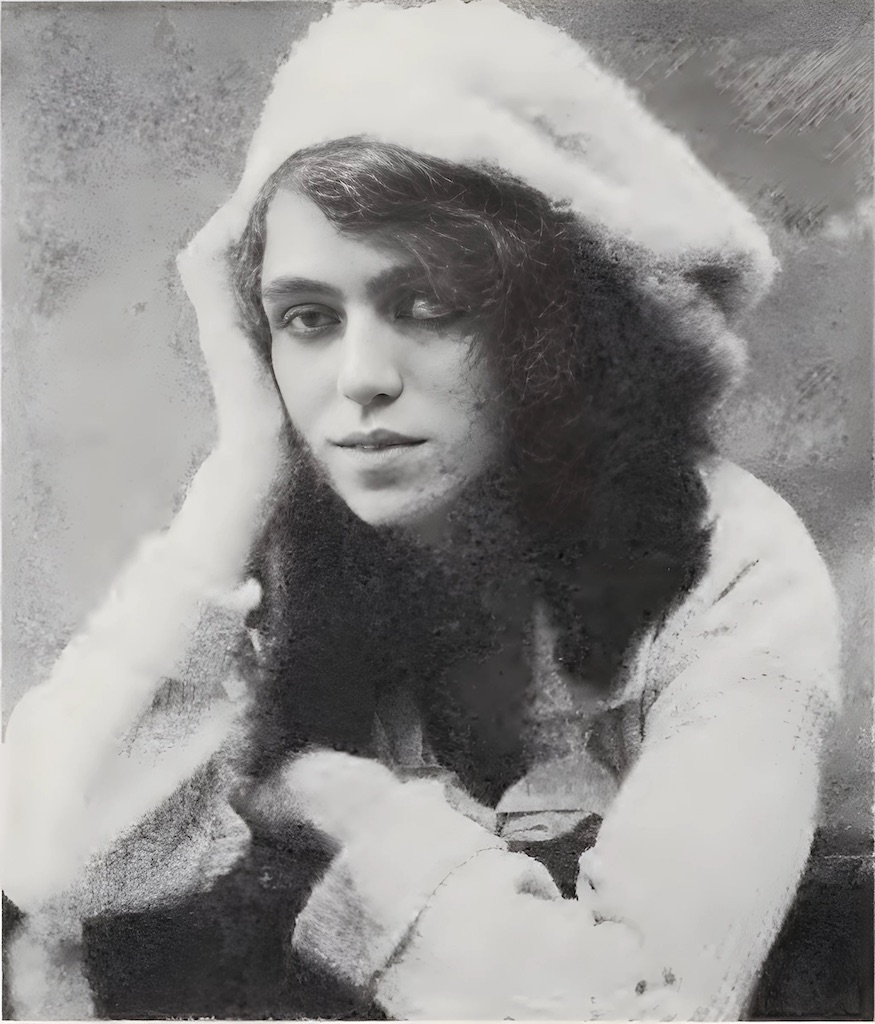
- Photo of Ivy Holmes taken in Prague, ca. 1910
- Born: Florence Ivy Mary Holmes; 11 April 1891; Chicago, United States
- Died: 29 March 1983 (aged 91); Hindhead, Surrey
- Spouses: Archibald Stansfeld Belaney (m. 1917–1922) John Kingston Edward Cash (m. 1922)

Florence Ivy Mary Holmes (1891–1983) was a dancer and the English wife of Archibald Belaney (1888 – 1938), commonly known as "Grey Owl".

== Early life ==
Ivy was born in Chicago, Cook County, Illinois on 11 April 1891, the daughter of John Robert Holmes, a doctor, and Florence Amelia Jane Abraham (1864-1941). (Note: The birth place and date are corroborated by the 1921 Census of England & Wales and the 1939 Register. The census of 1921 documents her birth place as Chicago. The register record of 1939 documents her birth date as 11 April 1891.)

Her father died when she was only two, and her mother returned to west London, initially in Bedford Park, later moving to Hammersmith. Around 1900, Florence became friends with the aunts of her future husband, Archibald Belaney, in Hastings, due to a shared interest in purebred Collie dogs. (Belaney was raised by his two aunts and grandmother, his father and mother having been deemed unfit for parenthood by the family.) Florence and Ivy began visiting the Belaney family during school holidays at their home, Highbury Villa on St. James' Road.

"Archie liked Ivy and tried to impress her. Thinking she would be interested, he showed her how he fed frogs to his snakes." "He was always a tremendous admirer of the Red Indians." She recalled playing at being Indians with Archie: "I was his squaw 'Dancing Moonbeam', he was 'Big Chief Thunderbinder'". Several of Belaney's school friends later recalled "his intense interest in nature and his love for animals and Red Indian lore".

Belaney would stay with the Holmeses at their home in Hammersmith while exploring the city. He and his aunt Ada also stayed with them on the way to Liverpool, where, on 29 March 1906, he boarded the SS Canada for Halifax, Nova Scotia. That was the last Ivy saw of him till after the war.

== Career as dancer ==
Trained as a ballet dancer in London, Ivy joined an English troupe at the age of 15. The company danced and imitated famous British actors. Escorted by her mother, Ivy performed in many European countries from 1906 to 1912, including Belgium, the Austro-Hungarian Empire, Poland, Russia, Serbia, Bulgaria, and Turkey. After a run of three months in Constantinople, the tour was cut short by the outbreak of the Balkan War in 1912, and Ivy and her mother returned to England.

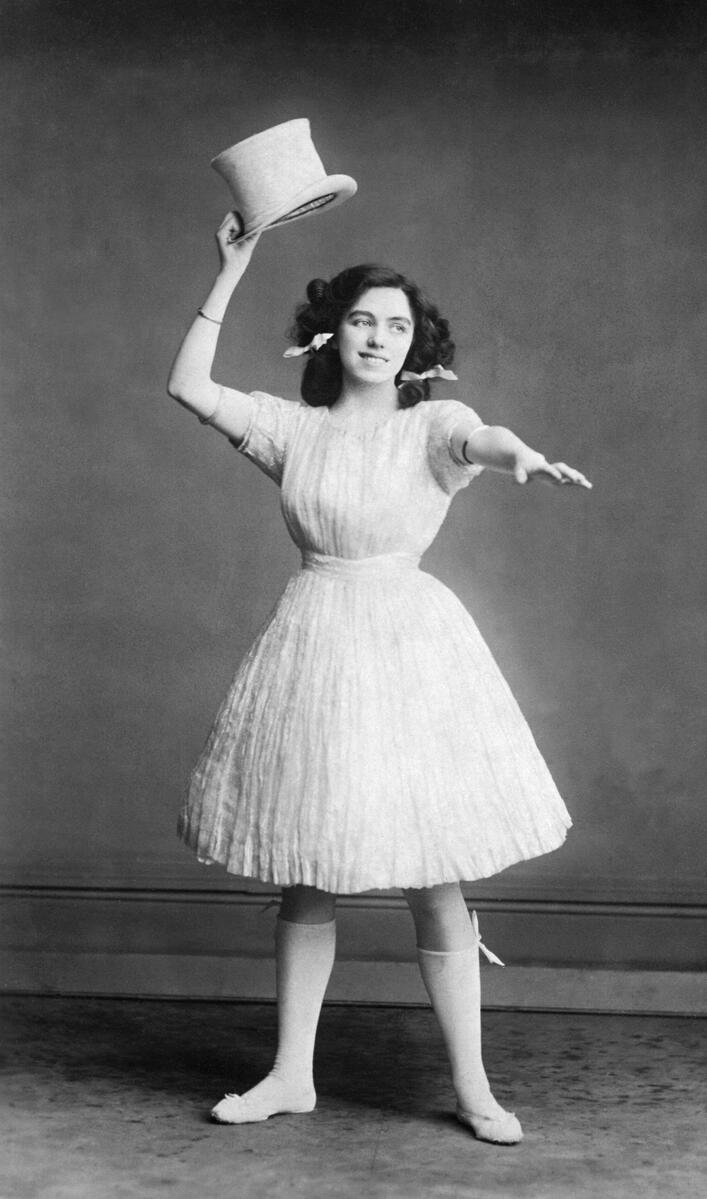
Ivy Holmes posing with hat. ca. 1912-1914

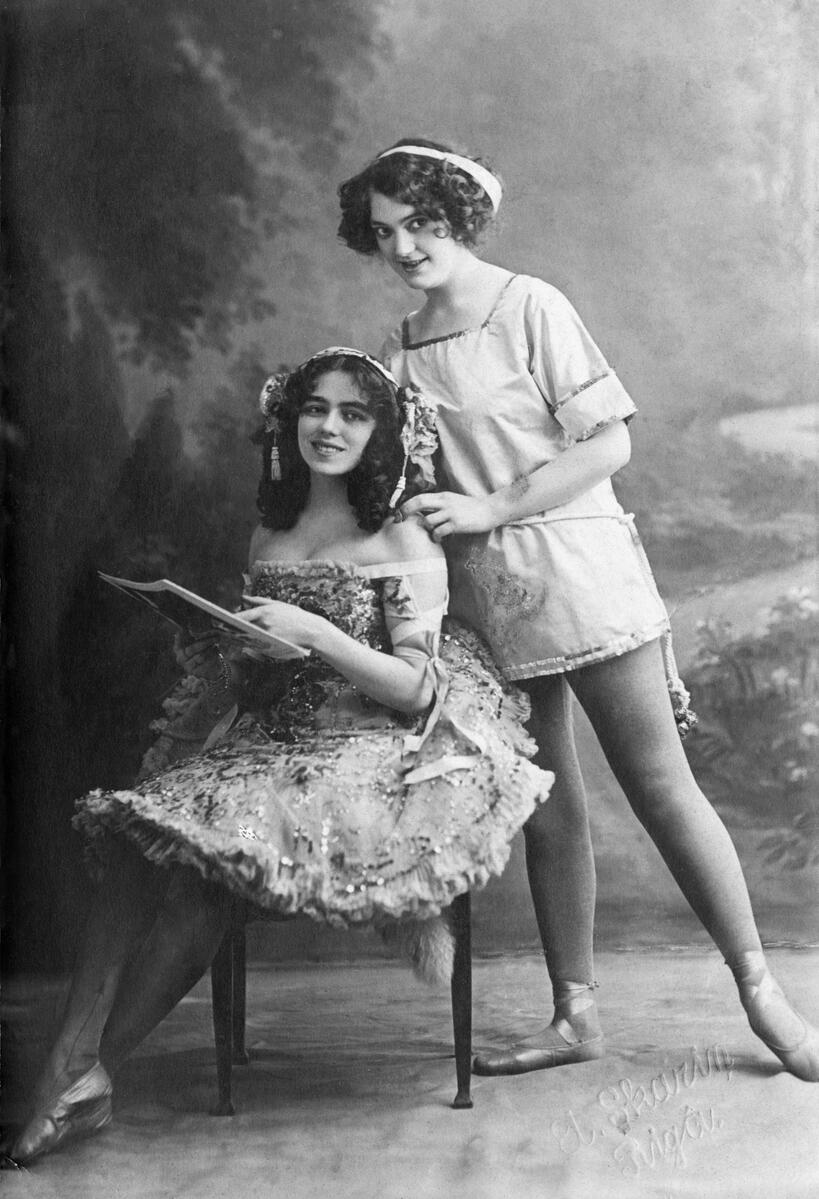
Ivy Holmes posing seated. ca. 1912-1914

== Marriage to Belaney ==
During World War I, Belaney served in the Canadian Overseas Expeditionary Force on the front line in France. He was shipped back to England after being severely wounded in the right foot, where it was found necessary to amputate a toe. From November 1916 to March 1917, he convalesced in the Canadian Military Hospital in his home town of Hastings.

At his aunts' suggestion, he contacted Ivy, whom he had not seen since 1906, when he had left for Canada. In 1938, she recalled their time together: “In 1916 he returned to London. He had all the glamour of a wounded soldier then. Lines of pain had given character to his dark, handsome face. I went to see him in hospital. We fell violently in love.”

For his part,

Archie, a future master of the stage himself, must have listened avidly to Ivy’s stories of travelling across Europe. In Russia she once saw a line of men chained to each other on their way to Siberia. Of all the European cities she visited, Ivy loved Vienna, and most of all Budapest. Her stories about her impersonations on stage must have fascinated this veteran of nearly a decade of presenting himself as part-Indian in Canada.

For her part,

Ivy enjoyed Archie’s company. Always he was so polite, and had excellent manners. He wore his hair short. In her presence he never drank or swore. In many ways the man had become but a larger projection of the boy, with the same intense love of nature and North American Indians.

They were married on 10 February 1917 at St Leonard's Church, Hollington, Hastings, by the Rev John Backhouse Holmes M.A. Her mother was a witness. Belaney stated that he was a bachelor, although he was still married to his first wife, Angele Egwuna, whom he had married in 1910 in Canada.

Encouraged by Ivy to start writing, Belaney completed a short manuscript about his first canoeing lessons in Temagami. Ivy later reported that he made the "backwoods sound terribly attractive”, but also said "I began to find him strange, secretive — almost sinister."

They decided that Archie should return to Canada, then, once he had established himself, she would follow. "Adventuresome as always, and deeply in love with her husband, Ivy accepted the plan of beginning a life together in the northern Canadian forest. Archie sailed on September 19, 1917. Ivy never saw him again."

Belaney eventually wrote to confess that he was already married. Ivy filed for divorce in 1921.

== Later life ==
In 1921 she was living with the family of her future husband in Paddington. She divorced Belaney in 1922 and after her divorce came through in September married John Kingston Edward Cash (1890–1963) later that year. They had a daughter, Vivien, born 1924. They lived in Twickenham; during the 1930s at Cresswell Road, and at Ellesmere Road in the 1940s. On 29 March 1983 she died in a nursing home in Hindhead, Surrey.
