= St Helen's Wood =

Woodland in Hastings, East Sussex, England

Coordinates: 50.878°N 0.577°E

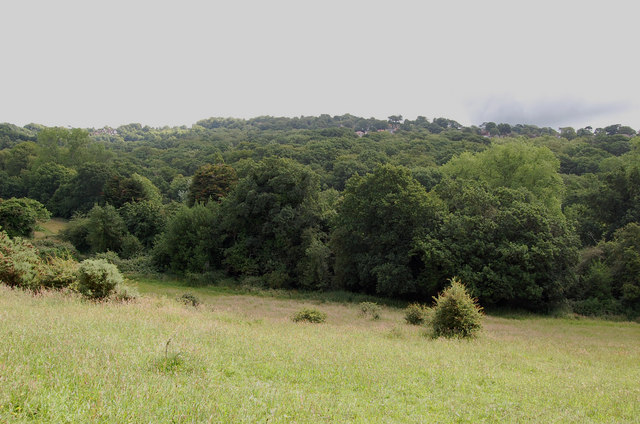
- Interactive map of St Helen's Wood
- Type: Local Nature Reserve
- Location: Hastings, East Sussex
- OS grid: TQ 814 119
- Area: 34.6 hectares (85 acres)
- Manager: St Helens Park Preservation Society

St Helen's Wood is a 34.6-hectare (85-acre) Local Nature Reserve in Hastings in East Sussex. It is owned and managed by the St Helens Park Preservation Society.

The wood has many broad-leaved helleborines. There are also areas of grassland which are managed by horse grazing. Meadow flowers include red bartsia and green-winged orchids.

There is access from St Helen's Wood Road.
