= Lovat Dickson =

Canadian publisher and writer (1902–1987)

- Born: Horatio Henry Lovat Dickson; June 30, 1902; Victoria, Australia
- Died: January 2, 1987 (aged 84); Toronto, Ontario, Canada
- Education: University of Alberta
- Occupations: Publisher, writer, biographer
- Spouse: Marguerite Brodie

Lovat Dickson, born Horatio Henry Lovat Dickson (June 30, 1902 – January 2, 1987), was a notable publisher and writer, the first Canadian to have a major publishing role in Britain. He is best known today for his biographies of Grey Owl, Richard Hillary, Radclyffe Hall and H. G. Wells. He also wrote a history of the Royal Ontario Museum.

== Biography ==
Lovat Dickson was born in Victoria, Australia to parents of United Empire Loyalist descent. His father was a mining engineer. At the age of seven, he moved with his family to Rhodesia (now Zimbabwe), and at eleven he was sent to school in England. At age fifteen, he moved to Canada, where he worked in a mining camp near Jasper, Alberta. A precocious entrepreneur, he founded and edited the Blue Diamond Mine newsletter while in Jasper. He began studies at the University of Alberta (U of A) in 1923, graduating in 1927 with first class honours in English and earning the Lieutenant Governor’s Gold Medal and a Royal Society of Canada Fellowship in English literature. He earned a Master of Arts degree from the U of A in 1929, but by this time he had already returned to England, where he embarked on a successful career as an editor and publisher. He was first assistant editor of the Fortnightly Review, and later the editor of the Review of Reviews. He started his own publishing company in 1932, called Lovat Dickson Limited, later forming a publishing partnership with Piers Gilchrist Thompson. He also founded the short-lived Lovat Dickson’s Magazine (20 issues, November 1933 to June 1935) in which he published short stories by such writers as Walter de la Mare, H. E. Bates, Fritiof Nilsson, V. S. Pritchett, D. H. Lawrence, and Vladimir Nabokov.

One of his major successes as a publisher was Pilgrims of the Wild by Grey Owl. Dickson made Grey Owl a celebrity in Great Britain by taking him on two highly successful promotional tours in 1935 and 1937. Pilgrims of the Wild was a huge bestseller when it was published in 1934, and Grey Owl's popularity in the United Kingdom reached a "phenomenal" level. Dickson at the time believed Grey Owl's claims to be indigenous. Grey Owl and Dickson became friends and Dickson wrote two memoirs of the enigmatic Englishman: Half Breed (1939) and Wilderness Man: The Strange Story of Grey Owl (1973). In a review of Wilderness Man, Tamela Topolie wrote that Dickson "...attempted to balance the myth against the reality of one of the strangest characters of the Canadian frontier...Dickson has written an entertaining story of a real eccentric and a vanishing way of life. He has painstakingly pieced together the tapestry of Grey Owl’s life through interviews and research. Whether the reader dislikes or admires his character, the story captivates the imagination".

In 1938, Dickson sold his catalogue to the publisher Peter Llewelyn Davies and joined the staff of Macmillan & Company in London. In 1940 he became a director and the following year, 1941, he was appointed the company’s general manager, a position he held until his retirement in 1964. In 1944, he published Out of the West Land, a roman à clef recounting his youth in 1920s Canada.

In 1946, he was contacted by the historian Hugh Trevor-Roper-who had been commissioned by Dick White of MI6, to write a report proving that Adolf Hitler was indeed dead-about turning his report into a book. After announcing the discovery of Hitler's burned corpse in the garden of the Reich Chancellery in Berlin in May 1945, the Soviet government retracted the statement and said was not clear if the corpse found burned was Hitler's. As part of a Cold War polemic, the Soviets claimed that Hitler was alive and well somewhere in the West, presumably being protected by the governments of the United Kingdom and the United States. To rebut that allegation had led White to commission Trevor-Roper to write a report intended to prove that Hitler was dead. Dickson agreed to publish Trevor-Roper's book with the terms that Trevor-Roper would receive 15% of the royalties on the first 5,000 copies sold and 20% on the rest of the copies. Through intended initially to be an account meant to prove once and for all that Hitler was dead, Trevor-Roper had expanded on his report to write an account of the last 10 days of Hitler's life in the Führerbunker under the Reich Chancellery. Dickson believed that Trevor-Roper's vivid account of the last ten days of Hitler's life would be a bestseller and won the bidding war to publish it. Dickson wrote to Trevor-Roper that the initial title of Hitler's End had been rejected and advised him to change the title of his book to The Last Days of Hitler, a suggestion that was accepted. The right-wing Zionist group Irgun, which was engaged in a guerrilla war against the British in the Palestine Mandate, issued a press statement sentencing Trevor-Roper to death, claiming that his book was supposedly a collective exoneration of the Germans. Dickson wrote to Trevor-Roper that was "aghast" at the Irgun death threat and advised him to seek police protection. The Last Days of Hitler was published on 22 March 1947 and became an instant bestseller.

He was married to Marguerite Brodie of Montreal. He died in Toronto at 84.

== Bibliography ==
- Out of the West Land (1934)
- The Green leaf: a tribute to Grey Owl (editor, 1938)
- Half Breed (1939) (memoirs about Grey Owl)
- Out of the West Land (1944)
- Richard Hillary (1950)
- The Ante-Room (1959)
- The House of Words (1963)
- H.G. Wells: His Turbulent Life and Times (1969; reprinted in 1971)
- Wilderness Man: The Strange Story of Grey Owl (1973)
- Radclyffe Hall and the Well of Loneliness: A Sapphic Chronicle (1975)
- The Museum Makers: The Story of the Royal Ontario Museum (1986)

== Books ==
- Siseman, Adam (2011). An Honourable Englishman: The Life of Hugh Trevor-Roper. New York: Random House. ISBN 9781400069767.
