= William Harris Lloyd Roberts =

Canadian writer, poet, and playwright

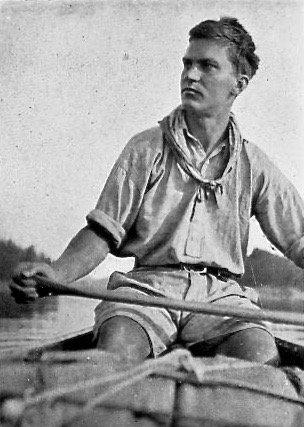
- Born: 31 October 1884; Fredericton, New Brunswick
- Died: 28 June 1966 (aged 81); Toronto, Ontario
- Occupations: Writer; poet; playwright
- Father: Charles G. D. Roberts

William Harris Lloyd Roberts (31 October 1884 – 28 June 1966) was a Canadian writer, poet, and playwright.

He was born in Fredericton, New Brunswick, the son of noted Canadian poet Charles George Douglas Roberts and Mary Isabel Fenety. After an education by private tutors, he attended King's Collegiate School then, in 1905, Fredericton High School. In 1903, he performed clerical work at McClure's magazine. From 1904 until 1907, he was an assistant editor at the Outing magazine, based in New York City. He wrote short stories and poetry for various magazines, plus performing part-time newspaper work starting in 1911.

On January 1, 1914, he was married to Helen Hope Farquhar Bolmain. The couple had a daughter, Patricia Bliss, before Helen died. In 1912, he became editor of immigration literature for the Canadian Department of Interior in Ottawa. Two years later, he served as a correspondent for the Timer and Grazing branch of the Interior Department in Ottawa. On August 15, 1914, he married his second wife, Lila White; the couple divorced shortly thereafter. After 1920 he retired from work in order to devote all of his time to writing fiction, drama, poetry, and special articles. From 1925 until 1939, he was a correspondent for the Christian Science Monitor, then he performed public relations for the Royal Canadian Mounted Police up to 1945. His third marriage in 1943 was to Julia Bristow, and they had two daughters.

== Bibliography ==
- England Over Seas (1914)
- Come Quietly, Britain (1915)
- Mother Doneby (1916)
- The Book of Roberts (1923)
- Along the Ottawa (1927)
- I Sing of Life (1937)
