= Saskatchewan Highway 263 =

Provincial highway in Saskatchewan, Canada

Highway 263

Route information
- Maintained by Ministry of Highways and Infrastructure
- Length: 65.9 km (40.9 mi)

Major junctions
- South end: CanAm Highway / Highway 2 at Christopher Lake
- Highway 953 in Doran Park; Highway 952 in Emma Lake; Highway 240 in Prince Albert National Park
- North end: Highway 264 / Kingsmere Road at Waskesiu Lake

Location
- Country: Canada
- Province: Saskatchewan
- Rural municipalities: Lakeland No. 521

Highway system
- Provincial highways in Saskatchewan
← Highway 255	→ Highway 264

Highway 263 is a provincial highway in Saskatchewan, Canada. Saskatchewan's 200-series highways primarily service its recreational areas. The highway runs from Highway 2 to Highway 264 in Prince Albert National Park at Waskesiu Lake. It is about 66 kilometres (41 mi) long.

Most of Highway 263 lies within the Prince Albert National Park. The section that lies outside of the park passes near the village of Christopher Lake and the hamlets of Bell's Beach, Sunnyside Beach, Nies Beach, Emma Lake, and Tweedsmuir.

Highway 263 also connects with Highway 952 and also junctions with Highway 240 just inside the national park's boundaries.

Both inside and outside the national park, many recreational areas and camping sites are accessible from the highway.

== Route description ==
Highway 263 begins in the District of Lakeland No. 521 at an intersection with Highway 2 (CanAm Highway) on the eastern edge of the village of Christopher Lake. It heads due west through the centre of town along Main Street E/W before leaving Christopher Lake and going through a switchback as it travels just to the south of both the lake of the same name and Bell's Beach. The highway has a junction with Highway 953 as it travels just to the south of Clearsand Beach, Nies Beach, and Sunnyside Beach and passes by a golf course. Highway 263 travels along the southern edge of the hamlets of Emma Lake, where it has a junction with Highway 952 near the southern shore of the Emma Lake, and Tweedsmuir before entering Prince Albert National Park. It travels west through remote woodlands along the southern edge of the park for a few kilometres to cross the Spruce River and have an intersection with Highway 240, with Highway 263 curving northward and winding its way past Halkett Lake. After crossing over the Spruce River for a second time, the highway has intersections with the access roads to Trappers Lake and Namekus Lake as it passes by several other small lakes and streams as it winds its way through the Waskesiu Hills. Entering the hamlet of Waskesiu Lake, the highway travels along Lakeview Drive, passing a golf course and running along the coastline Waskesiu Lake. After travelling through downtown, the highway turns away from the lake and comes to an end shortly thereafter at an intersection between Highway 264 and Kingsmere Road. The entire length of Highway 263 is a paved, two-lane highway.

== Major intersections ==
Rural municipality	Location	km	mi	Destinations	Notes
Lakeland No. 521	Christopher Lake	0.0	0.0	Highway 2 / CanAm Highway – La Ronge, Prince Albert	Southern terminus; road continues east as Township Road 530
Lakeland No. 521		2.9	1.8	New Lutheran Road – Bell's Beach, Christopher Lake, Kinasao Lutheran Bible Camp	
Lakeland No. 521		4.0	2.5	Ward Street – Spruce Point, Doran Park, Christopher Lake	
Lakeland No. 521	Doran Park	6.0	3.7	Spruce Road – Spruce Meadows	
Lakeland No. 521	Doran Park	6.6	4.1	Highway 953 north – Doran Park, Clearsand Beach, Bitch Bay, McPhail Cove, Anglin Lake, Great Blue Heron Provincial Park	Southern terminus of Hwy 953
Lakeland No. 521		8.2	5.1	Sunset Bay Resort access road	
Lakeland No. 521	Emma Lake	8.9	5.5	Lorraine Drive – Keystone Park	
Lakeland No. 521	Emma Lake	9.4	5.8	Highway 952 north – Emma Lake, Sunnyside Beach, Carwin Park, Guises Beach, McIntosh Point, Murray Point	Southern terminus
Lakeland No. 521	Tweedsmuir	13.3	8.3	Okema Beach Road (Range Road 2274) – Okema Beach, Rothenburg Resort	
Lakeland No. 521	Tweedsmuir	16.6	10.3	Range Road 2280 – Montreal Lake 106B	
Prince Albert National Park		21.4	13.3	Bridge over the Spruce River	
Prince Albert National Park		21.6	13.4	Highway 240 south – West Side, Shellbrook	Northern terminus of Hwy 240
Prince Albert National Park		28.2	17.5	Halkett Lake access road	
Prince Albert National Park		37.1	23.1	Bridge over the Spruce River	
Prince Albert National Park		43.6	27.1	Trappers Lake	
Prince Albert National Park		53.7	33.4	Namekus Lake access road	
Prince Albert National Park		56.7	35.2	Height of Land access road	
Prince Albert National Park		59.4	36.9	Narrows Road – Mud Creek, Trippes Beach, King Island, Paignton Beach, Treebeard, Narrows Campground	
Prince Albert National Park	Waskesiu Lake	65.9	40.9	Highway 264 east to Highway 2 – Prince Albert, La Ronge, Elk Ridge; Kingsmere Road – Red Deer, Beaver Glen, Waskesiu Marina	Northern terminus; western terminus of Hwy 264
1.000 mi = 1.609 km; 1.000 km = 0.621 mi

== See also ==
- Transportation in Saskatchewan
- Roads in Saskatchewan
