= Anglin (disambiguation) =

The Anglin is a river in central France. Anglin may also refer to:

== People ==
- Anglinus, also known as Anglin (died 746), abbot of Stavelot Abbey
- Andrew Anglin (born 1984), editor of the neo-Nazi website The Daily Stormer
- Anne Anglin (born 1942), Canadian actress
- Francis Alexander Anglin (1865–1933), Chief Justice of Canada from 1924 until 1933
- Jack Anglin (1916–1963), American country music singer
- Jahshaun Anglin (born 2001), Jamaican footballer
- Joe Anglin, an American-born Canadian politician
- John Anglin (Medal of Honor) (1850–1905), sailor in the U.S. Navy during the American Civil War
- Margaret Anglin (1876–1958), Canadian-born Broadway actress, director and producer
- Timothy Anglin, (1822–1896), Canadian politician and Speaker of the Canadian House of Commons
- Winston Anglin (1962–2004), Jamaican international football player
- The Anglin brothers, American criminals who took part in the June 1962 Alcatraz escape
  - John Anglin (criminal) (1930–missing since 1962)
  - Clarence Anglin (1931–missing since 1962)

== Places ==
- Anglin Bay, a bay on the western shore of the Cataraqui River at Kingston, Ontario
- Anglin Lake, a lake in Saskatchewan
- Anglin Lake, Saskatchewan, a hamlet in Saskatchewan

== Other uses ==
- Anglin J6 Karatoo, an Australian aircraft

== See also ==
- Los Anglin, West Virginia, an unincorporated community in Lewis County, West Virginia
