= Saskatchewan Highway 952 =

Provincial highway in Saskatchewan, Canada

Highway 952

Route information
- Maintained by Ministry of Highways and Infrastructure
- Length: 6.3 km (3.9 mi)

Major junctions
- South end: Highway 263 in Emma Lake
- North end: Okema Beach Road / Township Road 534 near Okema Beach

Location
- Country: Canada
- Province: Saskatchewan

Highway system
- Provincial highways in Saskatchewan
← Highway 951	→ Highway 953

Highway 952 is a provincial highway in Saskatchewan, Canada. It runs from Highway 263 in Emma Lake to Okema Beach. It is about 6.3 kilometres (3.9 mi) long.

Highway 952 provides access to the subdivisions of Carwin Park, Guises Beach, McIntosh Point, and Okema Beach. The Emma Lake (Murray Point) Recreation Site section of Great Blue Heron Provincial Park on Emma Lake is also accessible from Highway 952.

== See also ==
- Roads in Saskatchewan
- Transportation in Saskatchewan
