= McPhee Lake =

Lake in Saskatchewan, Canada

- Location in Saskatchewan McPhee Lake (Canada)
- Location: District of Lakeland No. 521, Saskatchewan
- Coordinates: 53.8755°N 105.9624°W
- Part of: Saskatchewan River drainage basin
- Primary inflows: McPhee Creek
- Basin countries: Canada
- Surface area: 188.4 ha (466 acres)
- Max. depth: 6.2 m (20 ft)
- Shore length^{1}: 11.2 km (7.0 mi)
- Surface elevation: 565 m (1,854 ft)
- Settlements: McPhee Lake subdivision
- ^{1} Shore length is not a well-defined measure.

McPhee Lake is a small recreational lake in Saskatchewan, Canada. It is in the District of Lakeland No. 521, about 40 kilometres (25 mi) north-northwest of Christopher Lake and just east of the main entrance to Prince Albert National Park. Access is from Highway 264. Most of the lake's amenities are at its western end, including McPhee Lake subdivision, McPhee Lake Beach, and a campground. A public boat launch, which is accessed from Highway 264, is on the south-western shore. Elk Ridge Resort is a short distance to the north-west along Highway 264.

McPhee Lake is set in the boreal forest within the Spruce River watershed. The Spruce River is a tributary of the North Saskatchewan River. McPhee Lake's primary inflow is McPhee Creek. Its outflow is a creek that leaves the lake from the south-western end and flows south-west to Namekus Lake.

== Fish species ==
Fish species commonly found in McPhee Lake include walleye, northern pike, yellow perch, white sucker, and burbot. The lake is stocked every few years with walleye fry.

== See also ==
- List of lakes of Saskatchewan
- Tourism in Saskatchewan
