= Emma Lake (Saskatchewan) =

Lake in Saskatchewan, Canada

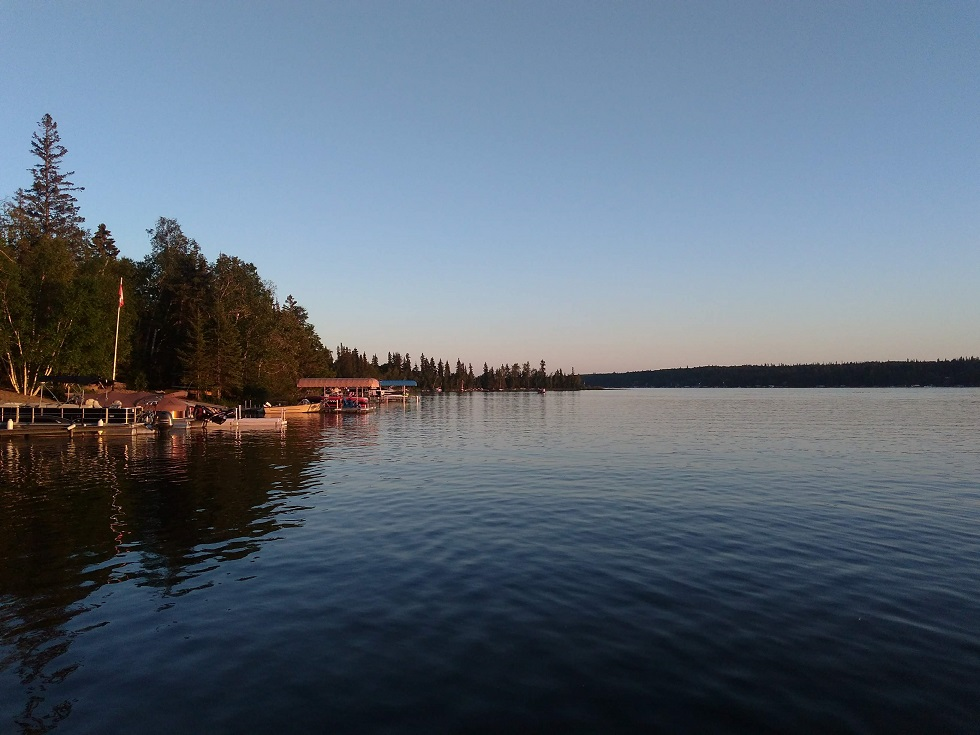
- Emma Lake

- Location in Saskatchewan Emma Lake (Canada)
- Location: Lakeland No. 521, Saskatchewan
- Coordinates: 53°36′35″N 105°54′50″W
- Type: Lake
- Part of: Saskatchewan River drainage basin
- Primary inflows: Montreal Creek, Emma Lake Diversion
- River sources: Waskesiu Upland
- Primary outflows: Christopher Lake diversion
- Catchment area: 161 km^{2} (62 sq mi)
- Basin countries: Canada
- Surface area: 1,874 ha (4,630 acres)
- Max. depth: 10.1 m (33 ft)
- Shore length^{1}: 66.9 km (41.6 mi)
- Surface elevation: 519 m (1,703 ft)
- Islands: Fairy Island; Cattle Island
- Settlements: Emma Lake
- ^{1} Shore length is not a well-defined measure.

Emma Lake is a recreational lake in the Canadian province of Saskatchewan. It is near the southern limit of the boreal forest, about 45 kilometres (28 mi) north of Prince Albert. The lake is within the District of Lakeland No. 521 and east of Prince Albert National Park. Much of the northern half of the lake is within the Great Blue Heron Provincial Park. There are several small communities and recreational opportunities around Emma Lake and is from Highways 953, 952, and 263.

== Description ==
Emma Lake is in the Spruce River drainage basin. The Spruce River is a tributary of the North Saskatchewan River. The lake consists of three main sections that are connected by narrow straits. The northern section is mostly within Great Blue Heron Provincial Park and includes Fairy Island Wildlife Refuge (53.6187°N 105.9463°W) and the small community of Okema Beach. Cattle Island separates the northern section from the central one and Murray Point and McPhail Cove are found there. The strait at McIntosh Point separates the central section from the southern one. The southern section consists of Munsons and Sunset Bays and numerous communities, including Nies Beach, Emma Lake, Guises Beach, and Sunnyside Beach. Montreal Creek is the primary natural inflow while Emma Lake diversion from Anglin Lake is the greatest by volume inflow. Prior to the completion of the diversion, neither Emma nor neighbouring Christopher Lake were connected to the Spruce River.

== Emma Lake diversion ==
Anglin, Emma, and Christopher Lakes historically have experienced extreme variations in seasonal water levels. To help alleviate this, with the construction of Spruce River Dam in 1960, the Emma Lake diversion was constructed from Anglin Lake to Emma Lake. The 10-kilometre (6.2 mi) long diversion channel begins at a pumphouse about 1 kilometre (0.62 mi) north-east of Spruce River Dam on Anglin Lake. Water is lifted up 8 m (26 ft) at a maximum rate of .65 m^{3} (23 cu ft) per second through a 284 m (932 ft) long pipeline into Gladys Lake. From there, the water uses gravity to travel through ditches, natural channels, and Blanche and Mae Lakes en route to the northern end of Emma Lake. The diversion channel went into operation on 23 June 1961 and, within a few years, Emma Lake water levels rose 1.8 m (5 ft 11 in) above 1960 levels. Annually, about 3,000 dam^{3} (2,400 acre⋅ft) is pumped into Emma Lake.

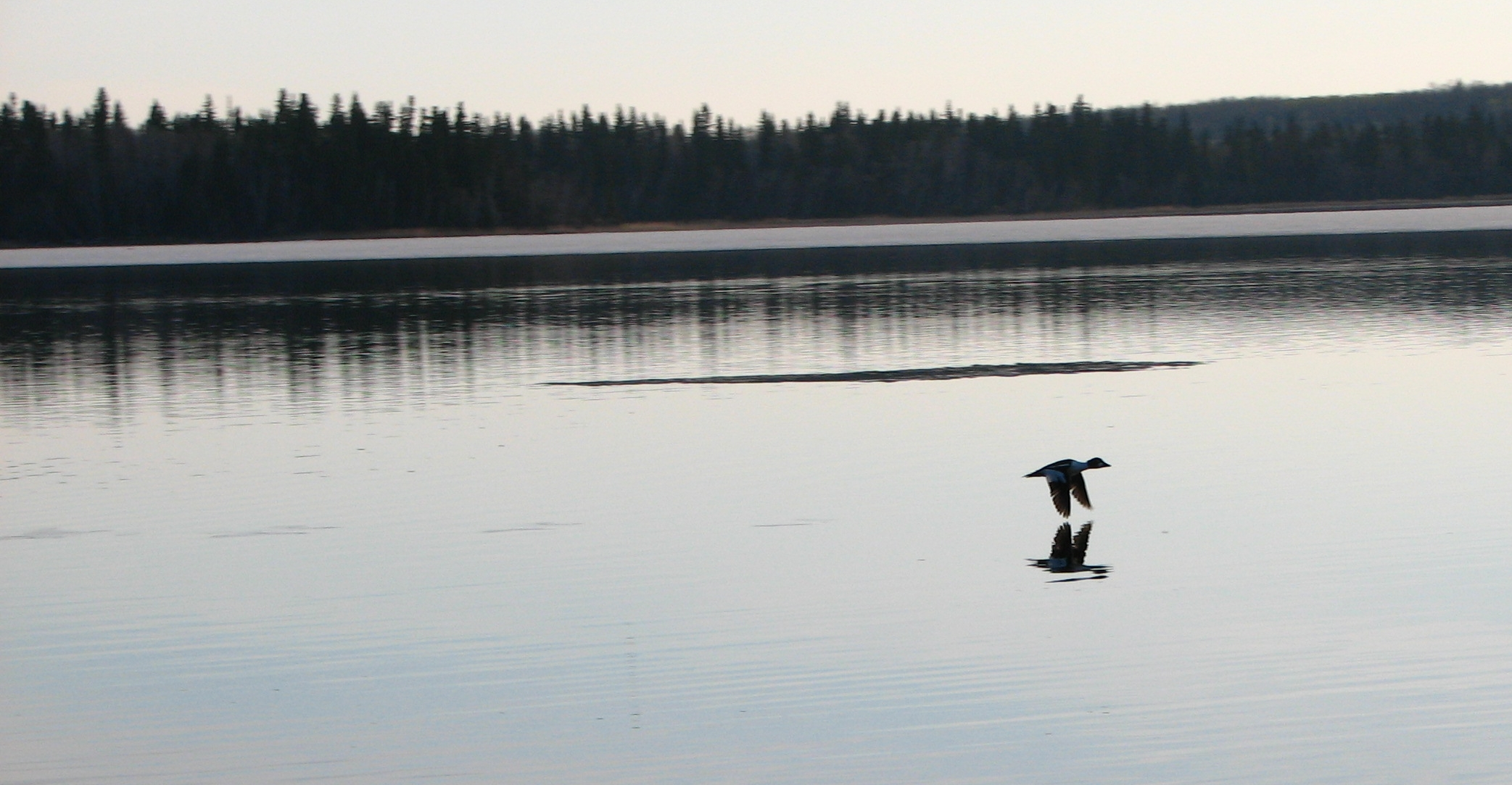
A duck on Emma Lake

The Emma Lake diversion project also included the construction of the Christopher Lake diversion. The first part of the Christopher Lake diversion is a short channel connects Emma Lake near Neis Beach to Christopher Lake at Clearsand Beach. The diversion opened in 1965 and, a few years later, water levels in Christopher Lake rose 2.2 m (7 ft 3 in) from 1960 levels. Controlling the outflow from Emma Lake is a .90 m (2 ft 11 in) grated culvert control structure through Highway 953. At the southern end of Christopher Lake is the second part of the Christopher Lake diversion project. It was the final phase of the diversion project and it involved constructing the lake's outflow at Christopher Creek. Christopher Creek is a partially natural run and partially constructed channel that flows south from Christopher Lake near the village of Christopher Lake to the Spruce River south of the Little Red River Indian Reserve. Water flowing into Christopher Creek is controlled by a two-bay log-stop structure which controls flow into two 1.07 m (3 ft 6 in) culverts. The structure allows drawdown of both Emma and Christopher Lakes simultaneously. This final phase of the project wasn't completed until 1975.

== Fish species ==
Fish commonly found in Emma Lake include walleye, northern pike, white sucker, and yellow perch.

== See also ==
- List of lakes of Saskatchewan
- Saskatchewan Water Security Agency
- Emma Lake Artists' Workshops
