= District of Lakeland No. 521 =

Rural municipality in Saskatchewan, Canada

Lakeland No. 521
- Rural municipality
- District of Lakeland No. 521; Rural Municipality of Lakeland No. 521 (1977–2011)
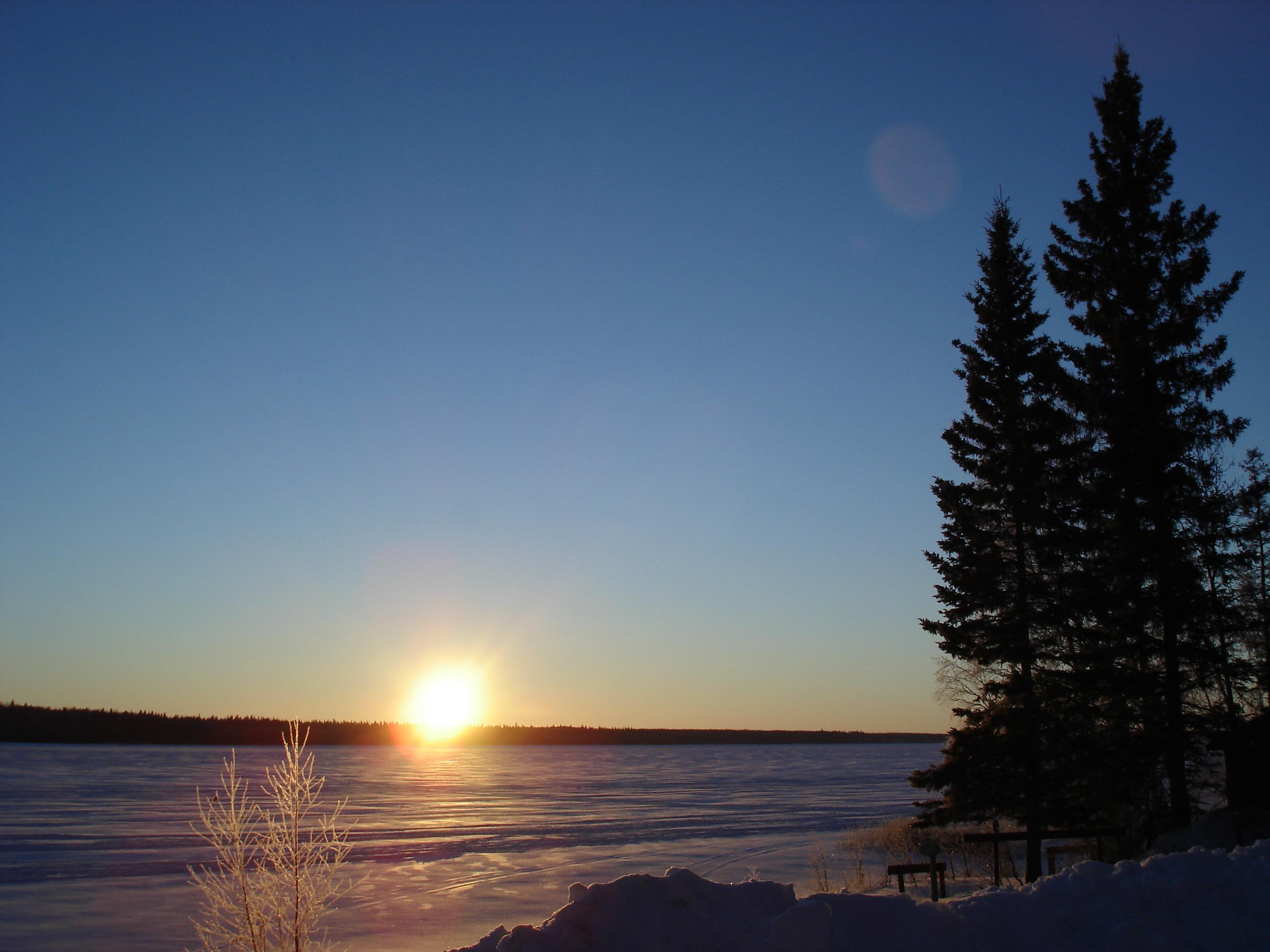
- Sunrise over Christopher Lake

- Location of the District of Lakeland No. 521 in Saskatchewan
- Coordinates: 53.641°N 105.904°W
- Country: Canada
- Province: Saskatchewan
- Census division: 15
- SARM division: 5
- Federal riding: Desnethé—Missinippi—Churchill River
- Provincial riding: Saskatchewan Rivers
- Formed: August 1, 1977
- Name change: June 1, 2011 (from RM of Lakeland No. 521)

Government
  - Reeve: Walter Plessl
  - Governing body: RM of Lakeland No. 521 Council
  - Administrator: Tammy Knuttila
  - Office location: Christopher Lake

Area (2016)
  - Land: 493.44 km^{2} (190.52 sq mi)

Population (2016)
  - Total: 915
  - Density: 1.9/km^{2} (4.9/sq mi)
- Time zone: CST
  - Summer (DST): CST
- Postal code: S0J 0N0
- Area codes: 306 and 639
- Website: Official website

The District of Lakeland No. 521 (2016 population: 915) is a rural municipality (RM) in the Canadian province of Saskatchewan within Census Division No. 15 and SARM Division No. 5.

== History ==
The RM of Lakeland No. 521 was originally incorporated as a rural municipality on August 1, 1977. Its name was changed to the District of Lakeland No. 521 on June 1, 2011.

== Geography ==
=== Communities and localities ===
The following urban municipalities are surrounded by the RM.

Villages

- Christopher Lake

The following unincorporated communities are within the RM.

Organized hamlets

- Elk Ridge

Localities

- Anglin Lake
- Clearsand Beach
- Emma Lake
- Guises Beach
- McIntosh Point
- McPhail Cove
- McPhee Lake
- Murray Point
- Nies Beach
- Okema Beach
- Sunnyside Beach
- Tweedsmuir

== Demographics ==
Population history (1981–2016)
| Year | Pop. | ±% |
|---|---|---|
| 1981 | 663 | — |
| 1986 | 495 | −25.3% |
| 1991 | 594 | +20.0% |
| 1996 | 581 | −2.2% |
| 2001 | 664 | +14.3% |
| 2006 | 1,043 | +57.1% |
| 2011 | 884 | −15.2% |
| 2016 | 915 | +3.5% |
Source: Statistics Canada via Saskatchewan Bureau of Statistics

In the 2021 Census of Population conducted by Statistics Canada, the District of Lakeland No. 521 had a population of 1,300 living in 604 of its 1,859 total private dwellings, a change of 42.1% from its 2016 population of 915. With a land area of 488.65 km^{2} (188.67 sq mi), it had a population density of 2.7/km^{2} (6.9/sq mi) in 2021.

In the 2016 Census of Population, the District of Lakeland No. 521 recorded a population of 915 living in 438 of its 2,134 total private dwellings, a 5.3% change from its 2011 population of 869. With a land area of 493.44 km^{2} (190.52 sq mi), it had a population density of 1.9/km^{2} (4.8/sq mi) in 2016.

== Government ==
The District of Lakeland No. 521 is governed by an elected municipal council and an appointed administrator that meets on the second Monday of every month. The reeve of the RM is Walter Plessl while its administrator is Tammy Knuttila. The RM's office is located in Christopher Lake.

== Transportation ==
- Saskatchewan Highway 2
- Saskatchewan Highway 263
- Saskatchewan Highway 952
- Saskatchewan Highway 953

== See also ==
- List of rural municipalities in Saskatchewan
