= Saskatchewan Highway 240 =

Provincial highway in Saskatchewan, Canada

Highway 240

Route information
- Maintained by Ministry of Highways and Infrastructure
- Length: 56.7 km (35.2 mi)

Major junctions
- South end: Highway 55 near Shellbrook
- North end: Highway 263 in Prince Albert National Park

Location
- Country: Canada
- Province: Saskatchewan
- Rural municipalities: Shellbrook

Highway system
- Provincial highways in Saskatchewan
← Highway 229	→ Highway 247

Highway 240 is a provincial highway in the Canadian province of Saskatchewan. Saskatchewan's 200-series highways primarily service its recreational areas. The highway runs from Highway 55 in the Rural Municipality of Shellbrook No. 493 to Highway 263 in Prince Albert National Park. It is about 56.7 kilometres (35.2 mi) long.

== Route description ==
Hwy 240 begins at a T-intersection with Hwy 55 (Northern Woods and Water Route) just north of the town of Shellbrook, with the road continuing south towards the town as Hwy 55 southbound. It heads north through rural farmland as a paved two-lane highway, traversing a switchback while passing through the locality of Marchantgrove before passing through Foxdale and crossing the Sturgeon River. The highway passes through Cookson before curving northeast as it enters remote woodlands, entering Prince Albert National Park as the pavement transitions to gravel. Hwy 240 now winds its way eastward through the southern sections of the park for a few kilometres, where it has an intersection with Hwy 693, before coming to an end near the banks of the Spruce River at a junction with Hwy 263.

== Major intersections ==
From south to north:

Rural municipality	Location	km	mi	Destinations	Notes
Shellbrook No. 493		0.0	0.0	Highway 55 (NWWR) – Prince Albert, Shellbrook, Meadow Lake	Southern terminus; southern end of paved section
Shellbrook No. 493		28.8	17.9	Bridge over the Sturgeon River	
Shellbrook No. 493	Prince Albert National Park Boundary	40.0	24.9	Northern end of paved section	
Prince Albert National Park		48.9	30.4	Highway 693 south – Mayview	Northern terminus of Hwy 693
Prince Albert National Park		56.7	35.2	Highway 263 – Waskesiu, Prince Albert	Northern terminus
1.000 mi = 1.609 km; 1.000 km = 0.621 mi

== See also ==
- Transportation in Saskatchewan
- Roads in Saskatchewan
