= Christopher Lake (Saskatchewan) =

Lake in Saskatchewan, Canada

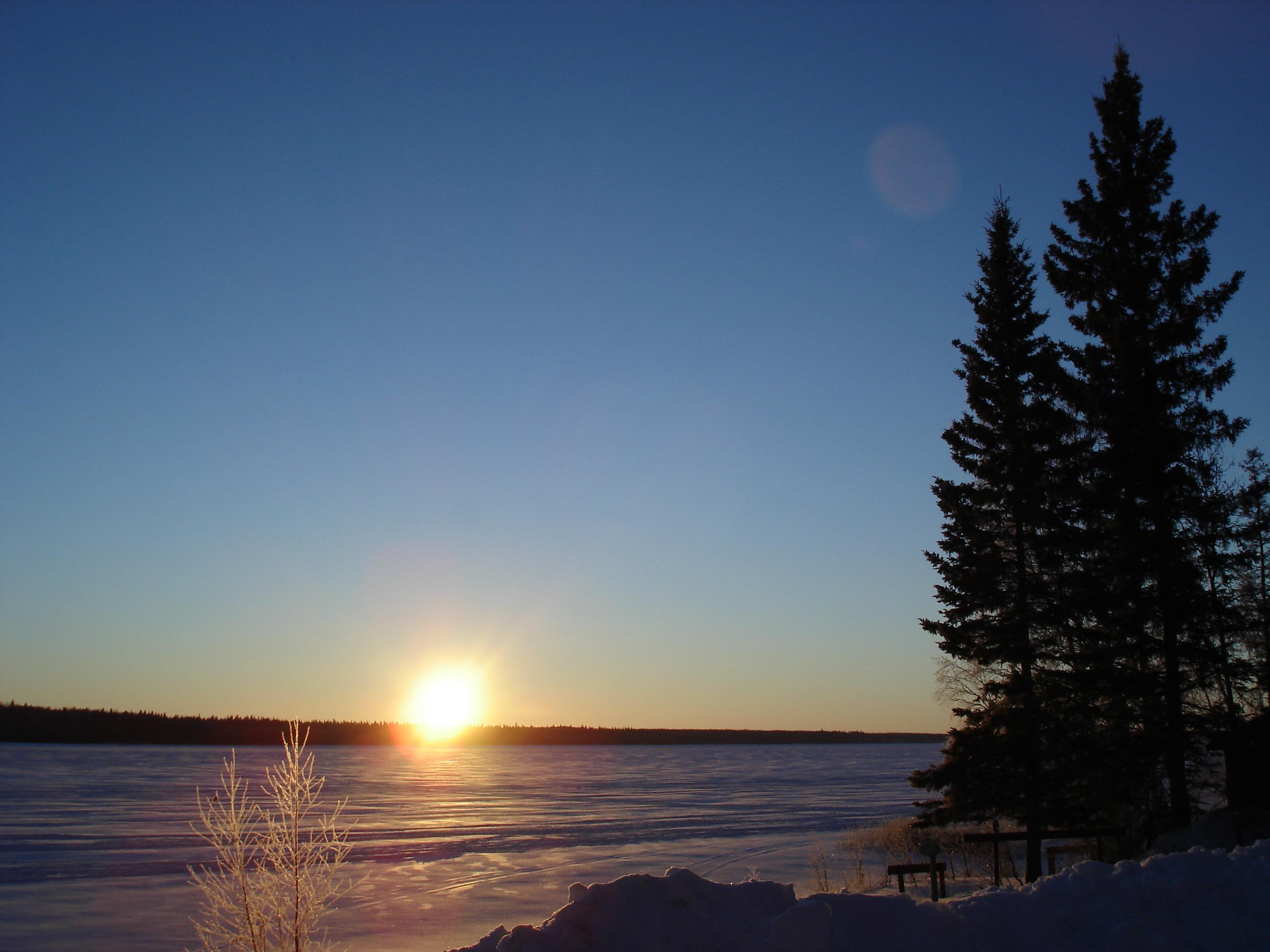
- Christopher Lake

- Location in Saskatchewan Christopher Lake (Canada)
- Location: District of Lakeland No. 521, Saskatchewan
- Coordinates: 53.5656°N 105.8256°W
- Part of: Saskatchewan River drainage basin
- Primary inflows: Christopher Lake diversion
- River sources: Waskesiu Upland
- Primary outflows: Christopher Creek
- Catchment area: 25 km^{2} (9.7 sq mi)
- Basin countries: Canada
- Max. length: 14.61 km (9.08 mi)
- Surface area: 1,646.2 ha (4,068 acres)
- Max. depth: 10.1 m (33 ft)
- Shore length^{1}: 18.02 km (11.20 mi)
- Surface elevation: 512 m (1,680 ft)
- Islands: Campbell Island
- Settlements: Bell's Beach; Clearsand Beach
- ^{1} Shore length is not a well-defined measure.

Christopher Lake is a recreational lake in the boreal forest ecozone in the Canadian province of Saskatchewan. It is south-east of Emma Lake and Great Blue Heron Provincial Park in the central part of the province in the District of Lakeland No. 521. Access to Christopher Lake is from Highways 953 and 263 and it is about 42 kilometres (26 mi) north of the city of Prince Albert.

The community of Bell's Beach is along the south-east corner of the lake and Clearsand Beach is along the western shore. The village of Christopher Lake is about 2 kilometres (1.2 mi) from the south-eastern corner of the lake and Bell's Beach. Along much of the southern half of the lake are cabins, cottages, and summer homes.

== Description ==
Christopher Lake is in the Spruce River drainage basin, which is in the North Saskatchewan River watershed. There are no major creeks that flow into the lake as it has, at only 25 square kilometres (9.7 sq mi), a small catchment area. The primary inflow for the lake is the man-made Christopher Lake diversion, which comes from neighbouring Emma Lake, and is part of the Emma Lake diversion project. Christopher Creek flows out of the lake at the southern end near Bell's Beach and the village of Christopher Lake. Prior to the construction of the Emma and Christopher Lake diversions, neither lake connected directly to the Spruce River.

== Christopher Lake diversion ==
In 1959, construction began on Spruce River Dam and the Emma Lake diversion project. The dam increased the size of Anglin Lake while the diversion drew water out of Anglin Lake and pumped it into Emma Lake. The construction of the dam was completed in 1960 and the first leg of the diversion channel was completed one year later in 1961. From a pumphouse about one kilometre north-east of the dam, about 3,000 dam^{3} (2,400 acre⋅ft) are pumped annually into Emma Lake. The first part of the Christopher Lake diversion, which was completed in 1965, is a short channel that connects Emma Lake to Christopher Lake near Clearsand Beach. Within a few years, the inflow from the diversion had increased water levels in the lake by 2.2 metres compared to 1960 levels. Controlling the inflow to Christopher Lake is a .90-metre (2 ft 11 in) high grated culvert control structure through Highway 953.

The outflow from Christopher Lake is via Christopher Creek and is controlled by a two-bay log-stop structure which controls flow into two 1.07-metre (3 ft 6 in) high culverts. The structure allows drawdown of both Emma and Christopher Lakes simultaneously. Christopher Creek is a partially natural run and partially constructed channel that flows out of Christopher Lake and heads south past Highway 263 towards the Little Red River Indian Reserve. It cuts through the eastern portion of the reserve and joins Spruce River just south of it. The Christopher Creek section of the Christopher Lake diversion project was completed in 1975.

== Parks and recreation ==
Christopher Lake is a recreational lake with parks, campgrounds, Christian camps, marinas, swimming, boating, and fishing. The two marinas are located at the southern end of the lake – one at Bell's Beach the other at Slottens Bay. Kinasao Lutheran Bible Camp is located on the eastern shore while the other three Bible camps, Quest at Christopher Lake, Camp Kadesh, and Camp Christopher, are on the western shore. At the south-eastern corner of the lake at Slottens Bay is the Christopher Lake Nature Area. This park has three hiking trails totalling about three kilometres for birdwatching and other wildlife viewing. In the winter, one of the trails is groomed for cross-country skiing and snowshoeing. The very northern tip of the lake is in Great Blue Heron Provincial Park, though there no facilities related to the park there.

== Fish species ==
Fish commonly found in the Christopher Lake include walleye and northern pike.

== See also ==
- List of lakes of Saskatchewan
- Tourism in Saskatchewan
