= Spruce River (Saskatchewan) =

River in Saskatchewan, Canada

Spruce River Little Red River
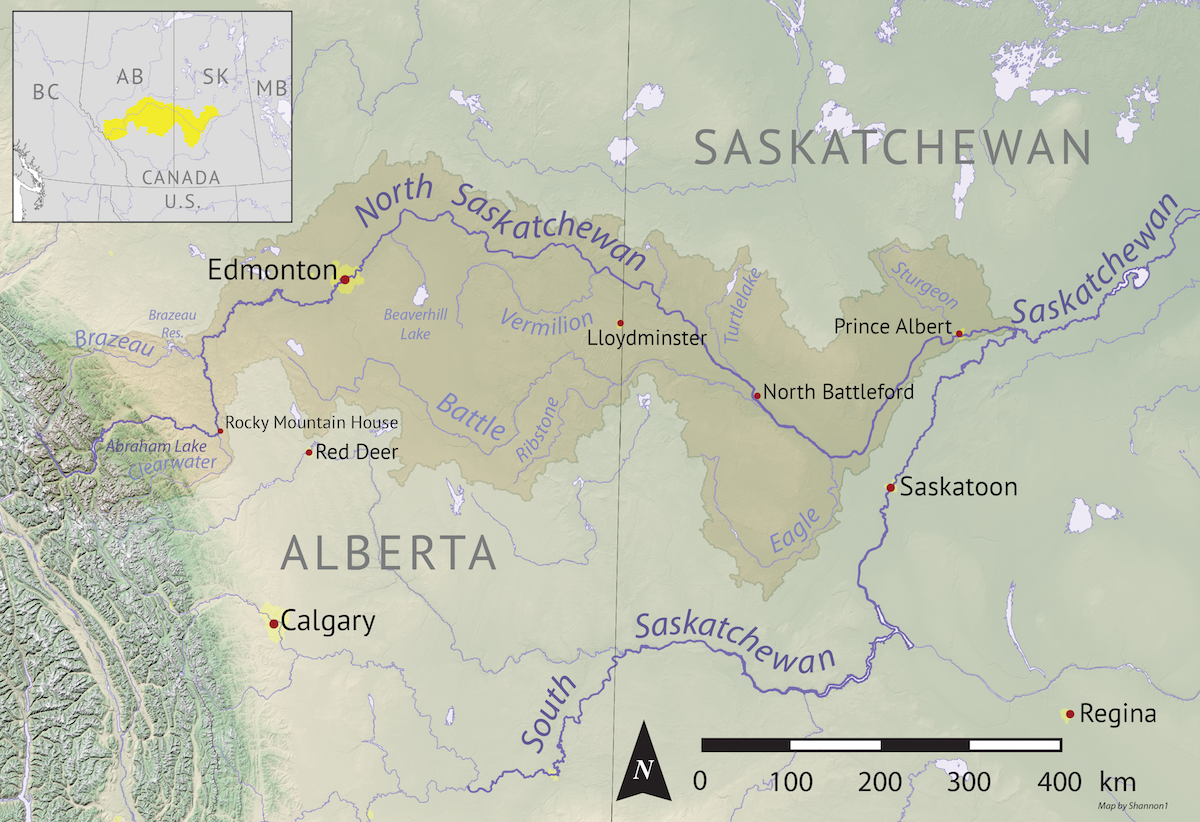
- North Saskatchewan River drainage basin

- Location of the mouth in Saskatchewan Spruce River (Saskatchewan) (Canada)

Location
- Country: Canada
- Provinces: Saskatchewan

Physical characteristics
- Source: Waskesiu Hills
  - location: Prince Albert National Park
  - coordinates: 53.7896°N 106.3951°W
- Mouth: North Saskatchewan River
  - location: Prince Albert
  - coordinates: 53.2184°N 105.7125°W
  - elevation: 415 m (1,362 ft)
- Basin size: 1,668 km^{2} (644 sq mi)

Basin features
- Tributaries
  - left: Christopher Creek
  - right: McKenzie Creek; Bell Creek

Spruce River, also called Little Red River, is a river in the north-central region of the Canadian province of Saskatchewan. It begins in the Waskesiu Hills in Prince Albert National Park and flows generally in a southward direction through boreal forests, glacier-carved hills and valleys, muskeg, and prairie en route to the North Saskatchewan River at the east end of the city of Prince Albert.

Several lakes with recreational amenities such as Namekus, McPhee, Anglin, Emma, Christopher, and Halkett are within its watershed. Anglin Lake was created by the building of Spruce River Dam along the river's course.

== Course and description ==
Spruce River begins at an unnamed lake at an elevation of over 710 metres (2,330 ft) in the Nimrod Hills range of the Waskesiu Hills, just south of the source for the neighbouring Sturgeon River in Prince Albert National Park. Sturgeon River parallels Spruce River south to the North Saskatchewan River ending up on the western side of Prince Albert. From its source, the Spruce River heads south out of the Nimrod Hills dropping over 60 metres (200 ft) in elevation into a valley. From there, it follows the valley east towards a natural portage at Beartrap Lake and Beartrap Creek. Beartrap Creek flows north into Waskesiu Lake and is part of the Churchill River watershed. From the portage, Spruce River turns south following a valley towards Anglin Lake and Spruce River Dam at the eastern boundary of Prince Albert National Park and the western boundary of Great Blue Heron Provincial Park. South of the dam, Spruce River leaves Prince Albert National Park and passes through three Indian reserves (Little Red River 106D, Montreal Lake 106B, and Little Red River 106C) before entering the RM of Buckland No. 491. From the Little Red River Indian Reserves south, Spruce River is also known as Little Red River. Once in the RM, the river carries on southward passing through Wahpaton Indian Reserve and Little Red River Park before entering the east end of Prince Albert and emptying into the North Saskatchewan River near Bateman Island.

=== Tributaries ===
The following are the tributaries of Spruce River from its headwaters in the Waskesiu Hills to its mouth at the North Saskatchewan River:

- Cowan Creek
- McKenzie Creek begins at Halkett Lake. Upstream from Halkett Lake are Kapesiwin and Witsukitshak Lakes.
- Bitter Creek flows into Anglin Lake from Trappers Lake. The creeks from Namekus Lake in Prince Albert National Park and McPhee Lake flow southward into Trappers Lake.
  - McPhee Creek flows into McPhee Lake and its watershed is the farthest north in the Spruce River drainage basin.
- Bell Creek flows in from the west.
  - Kitigan Creek
- Christopher Creek drains Christopher and Emma Lakes and is part of the Emma Lake diversion.
  - Montreal Creek flows into Emma Lake from Marshall Lake.

== Spruce River Dam ==
The Spruce River Dam (53.6663°N 106.0085°W), located along the south-eastern boundary of Prince Albert National Park, was built in 1960 along the course of the Spruce River by the Government of Canada's Department of Northern Affairs to regulate flow along the river and to provide additional water for a diversion into the recreational lakes of Emma and Christopher. About 2.5 km (1.6 mi) upstream was another dam that was built in 1939. The 1960 Spruce River Dam was built to replace that 1939 dam as it was prone to washouts. The building of the Spruce River Dam also over-flowed the Tower Road Dams that were used to control the water levels of Anglin Lake's Jacobsen Bay by .4 m (1 ft 4 in). With the building of the dam, Anglin Lake water levels increased from the original levels by 1 m (3 ft 3 in).

Spruce River Dam is 243 m (797 ft) long and 6.1 m (20 ft) high. It is an embankment dam with a concrete spillway made up of four 2.43 m (8 ft 0 in) wide stop-log bays. A grated culvert controls the water's flow between 1 April and 31 October to allow a riparian downstream flow of .14 m^{3}/s (4.9 cu ft/s). Access to the dam is from Highway 953.

=== Emma Lake diversion ===
The Emma Lake diversion project was built in conjunction with Spruce River Dam. About one kilometre north-east of the dam along Anglin Lake's eastern shore is a pumphouse that lifts water up eight metres at a maximum rate of .65 m^{3} (23 cu ft) through a 284 m (932 ft) long pipeline into a 10-kilometre long diversion channel that flows into Emma Lake at its northern end. The diversion channel went into operation 1961 and, within a few years, Emma Lake water levels rose 1.8 m (5 ft 11 in) above 1960 levels. At the south-eastern corner of Emma Lake, a short channel was built connecting Emma to Christopher Lake. This channel, called the Christopher Lake diversion, opened in 1965 and, within a few years, had risen the water levels of Christopher Lake by 2.2 m (7 ft 3 in) above 1960 levels. At the southern end of Christopher Lake, a partially man-made, partially natural channel called Christopher Creek was constructed that connects with Spruce River farther downstream, south of Little Red River Indian Reserve. Prior to the construction of the Emma Lake diversion, Emma and Christopher Lakes did not connect to Spruce River.

== Parks and recreation ==
The Spruce River begins in the south-central area of Prince Albert National Park in the Waskesiu Hills. From there it heads east then south near the south-eastern boundary of the park. The park has multiple trails throughout and several of them run along or intersect with the Spruce River. The Spruce River Trail and the Freight Tait Springs Trail both follow sections of the river and the trailhead for Spruce River Highlands Trail is on Highway 263 at the river crossing. The Spruce River Highlands Trail has a one-kilometre spur trail that connects up with 18 kilometres of trails in neighbouring Great Blue Heron Provincial Park by Anglin Lake. Most of Anglin Lake is in Great Blue Heron Provincial Park and there are several campgrounds, hiking trails, and fishing opportunities at the lake.

=== Little Red River Park ===
Little Red River Park is a Prince Albert city park located near the mouth of the Spruce River. It is a 500 ha (1,200 acres) forested park that provides year-round recreational opportunities. There are over 30 km (19 mi) of trails for hiking, cycling, cross-country skiing, and snowshoeing.

== Fish species ==
Fish commonly found in the river include walleye and northern pike.

== See also ==
- List of rivers of Saskatchewan
- Hudson Bay drainage basin
- Tourism in Saskatchewan
