= Saskatchewan Highway 264 =

Provincial highway in Saskatchewan, Canada

Highway 264

Route information
- Maintained by Ministry of Highways and Infrastructure
- Length: 14.0 km (8.7 mi)

Major junctions
- West end: Highway 263 / Kingsmere Road at Waskesiu Lake
- East end: CanAm Highway / Highway 2 east of Prince Albert National Park

Location
- Country: Canada
- Province: Saskatchewan
- Rural municipalities: Lakeland

Highway system
- Provincial highways in Saskatchewan
← Highway 263	→ Highway 265

Highway 264 is a provincial highway in Saskatchewan, Canada. Saskatchewan's 200-series highways primarily service its recreational areas. The highway runs from the CanAm Highway (Highway 2) to Highway 263 in Prince Albert National Park at Waskesiu Lake. It is about 14 kilometres (8.7 mi) long.

About half of Highway 264 lies within the Prince Albert National Park. The section outside of it connects with Elk Ridge and an access road to McPhee Lake Beach.

== Route description ==
Highway 264 begins inside Prince Albert National Park in the village of Waskesiu Lake at the intersection between Kingsmere Road and Highway 263 (Lakeview Drive). It heads southeast past a golf course before leaving the village and having an intersection with Narrows Road. The highway then winds its way through remote woodlands for several kilometres to leave the park and enter the District of Lakeland No. 521, travelling through Elk Ridge and just to the south of McPhee Lake Beach. Shortly thereafter, Hihhway 264 comes to an end at the junction with Highway 2 (CanAm Highway). The entire length of Highway 264 is a paved, two-lane highway.

== Major intersections ==
Rural municipality	Location	km	mi	Destinations	Notes
Prince Albert National Park	Waskesiu Lake	0.0	0.0	Highway 263 south – Waskesiu Lake; Kingsmere Road – Red Deer, Beaver Glen, Waskesiu Marina	Western terminus; northern terminus of Hwy 263; road continues north as Kingsmere Road
Prince Albert National Park	Waskesiu Lake	0.3	0.19	Lost Creek Resort access road	
Prince Albert National Park	Waskesiu Lake	0.9	0.56	Park Compound access road	
Prince Albert National Park		2.1	1.3	Narrows Road to Highway 263 – Narrows	
Prince Albert National Park		4.6	2.9	Boundary Bog access road	
Prince Albert National Park		4.8	3.0	Prince Albert National Park East Gate	
Lakeland No. 521	Elk Ridge	7.5	4.7	Arne Petersen Way – Elk Ridge	
Lakeland No. 521	Mcphee Lake Beach	9.1	5.7	Elk Drive – McPhee Lake Beach	
Lakeland No. 521		14.0	8.7	Highway 2 / CanAm Highway – La Ronge, Prince Albert	Eastern terminus
1.000 mi = 1.609 km; 1.000 km = 0.621 mi

== See also ==
- Transportation in Saskatchewan
- Roads in Saskatchewan
