= Anglin Lake =

Lake in Saskatchewan, Canada

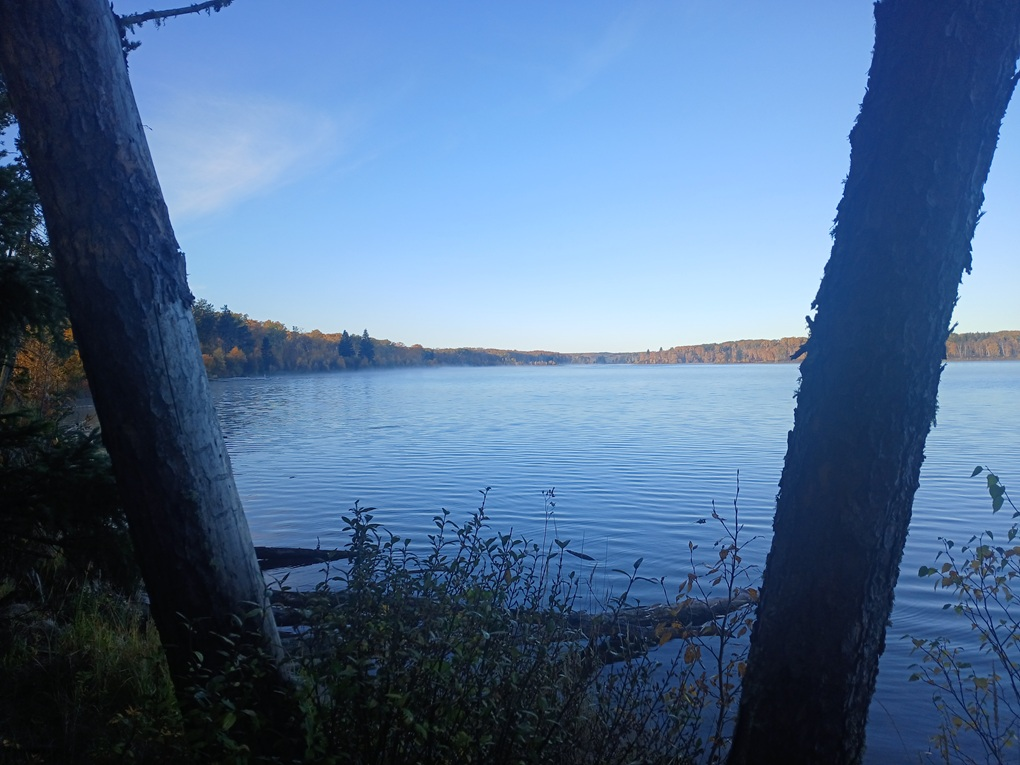
- Jacobsen Bay

- Location in Saskatchewan Anglin Lake (Canada)
- Location: Great Blue Heron Provincial Park, Saskatchewan
- Coordinates: 53.6912°N 106.0074°W
- Type: Reservoir
- Part of: Saskatchewan River drainage basin
- Primary inflows: Spruce River; Bitter Creek
- River sources: Waskesiu Upland
- Primary outflows: Spruce River
- Basin countries: Canada
- Surface area: 1,417 ha (3,500 acres)
- Max. depth: 24.7 m (81 ft)
- Water volume: 41,875 dam^{3} (1.4788×10^{9} cu ft)
- Shore length^{1}: 73.01 km (45.37 mi)
- Surface elevation: 526 m (1,726 ft)
- Islands: Callaghan Island; Turkey's Island
- Settlements: Anglin Lake
- ^{1} Shore length is not a well-defined measure.

Anglin Lake is a reservoir in the boreal forest ecozone in the Canadian province of Saskatchewan. It is east of Prince Albert National Park in the central part of the province in the District of Lakeland No. 521. Access to the lake is from Highway 953 and it is about 70 kilometres (43 mi) north of the city of Prince Albert. The only community on the lake is Anglin Lake.

== Anglin Lake history ==
Anglin Lake is a man-made lake in the Spruce River watershed. Beginning in the early 1900s, several different dams were built at varying stages along the Spruce River with the current dam being completed in 1960. Prior to the construction of any of the dams, Anglin Lake was a series of smaller lakes connected by natural channels that only flowed into the Spruce River in high water level years. In 1939, the first major dam was completed along the Spruce River. This dam backed up the water creating Jacobsen Bay (the westernmost portion of modern-day Anglin Lake) and connected it to the upstream East Anglin Lake (presently the main body of Anglin Lake), creating a larger body of water connected by a narrow channel. At the entrance to Jacobsen Bay, three different dams were constructed in 1936, 1940, and 1954 to regulate the water levels of Jacobsen Bay and East Anglin Lake. Collectively, these three dams were known as the Tower Road Dams.

The 1939 dam had a history of washouts. Because of this, combined with the need to regulate water levels in two nearby recreational lakes (Emma Lake and Christopher Lake), it was decided a new dam was needed. Two-and-a-half kilometres downstream, the Spruce River Dam was built in 1960 by the Government of Canada's Department of Northern Affairs to regulate flow on the river and to provide additional water for a diversion into Emma and Christopher Lakes. This new dam created a body of water between it and the original 1939 dam. It also increased the lake's water level by a further .4 metres (1 ft 4 in), over-topping the Tower Road Dams, and increasing overall original lake levels by 1 metre (3 ft 3 in). The increased volume of Anglin Lake connected it to Little Anglin Lake, creating a new bay called Christie Bay at the north-west corner of the lake where Bitter Creek flows in.

=== Emma Lake diversion ===
The Emma Lake diversion is a 10-kilometre (6.2 mi) long diversion channel that runs from Anglin Lake to Emma Lake. The channel begins at a pumphouse about one kilometre north-east of the Spruce River Dam. The pumphouse lifts water up from Anglin Lake 8 metres (26 ft) through 284 metres (932 ft) of pipeline to a channel that leads to Gladys Lake. From there, gravity takes the water through a series of ditches, natural channels, and Blanche and Mae Lakes into the northern end of Emma Lake. Pumping began on 23 June 1961 and after a few years, Emma Lake levels rose 1.8 metres (5 ft 11 in) above 1960 levels. The pumphouse, the original of which was replaced in 1997, pumps water at a rate of .65 cubic metres (23 cu ft) per second. The diversion and pumphouse are operated by the Saskatchewan Water Security Agency.

== Parks and recreation ==
Most of the lake is within Great Blue Heron Provincial Park. Fishing, swimming, hiking, and camping are activities on and around the lake. Rentals, such as boats, and accommodations are available at Land of the Loon Resort / Jacobsen Bay Outfitters. The westernmost point of the lake is in Prince Albert National Park.

Campgrounds found at the lake include Spruce River, Anderson Point, and Anglin Lake North.

A Scouts Canada camp, Anglin Lake Semi-Wilderness Camp, is located on the north-eastern shore.

== Fish species ==
Fish commonly found in the lake include chain pickerel, walleye, yellow perch, and northern pike. The lake is regularly stocked with walleye and was last stocked with 300,000 walleye fry in 2025.

== See also ==
- List of lakes of Saskatchewan
- Tourism in Saskatchewan
