= Kinsmen Ski and Snowboard Centre =

Ski area in Saskatchewan, Canada

- Location within Saskatchewan Location within Canada
- Location: Little Red River Park, Prince Albert, Saskatchewan, Canada
- Nearest city: Prince Albert
- Coordinates: 53.2233°N 105.7168°W
- Opened: December
- Closed: March
- Vertical: 11 m (36 ft)
- Top elevation: 438 m (1,437 ft)
- Base elevation: 427 m (1,401 ft)
- Trails: 3
- Total length: .3 m (1 ft 0 in)
- Lift system: 2 lifts
- Night skiing: yes

Kinsmen Ski and Snowboard Centre is a ski area in Little Red River Park at the western end of Prince Albert where the Spruce River meets the North Saskatchewan River. Little Red River Park is a 500-hectare (1,200-acre), year-round forested park that has downhill skiing and 30 kilometres (19 mi) of trails that are used for hiking and cycling during the summer and cross-country skiing and snowshoeing in the winter. Prince Albert city centre is about 5 kilometres (3.1 mi) away.

Kinsmen Ski and Snowboard Centre has two ski lifts and three illuminated and groomed ski hills. Two are rated "beginner" while the third is "intermediate". Winter activities include snowboarding, snowshoeing, downhill skiing, cross-country skiing, and tobogganing. Cosmo Lodge in Little Red River Park has a restaurant, concessions, and washrooms. Rentals are available.

== See also ==
- List of ski areas and resorts in Canada
- Tourism in Saskatchewan
