= Saskatchewan Highway 953 =

Provincial highway in Saskatchewan, Canada

Highway 953

Route information
- Maintained by Ministry of Highways and Infrastructure
- Length: 31.5 km (19.6 mi)

Major junctions
- South end: Highway 263 in Doran Park
- North end: CanAm Highway / Highway 2 near Anglin Lake

Location
- Country: Canada
- Province: Saskatchewan

Highway system
- Provincial highways in Saskatchewan
← Highway 952	→ Highway 954

Highway 953 is a provincial highway in Saskatchewan, Canada. It runs from Highway 263 to Highway 2 (CanAm Highway). It is about 32 kilometres (20 mi) long.

Highway 953 passes through the communities of Clearsand Beach, Nies Beach, McPhail Cove, and Anglin Lake. Highway 953 also provides access to the lakes of Emma, Christopher, Blanche, and Anglin as well as the Anglin Lake Recreation Site section of Great Blue Heron Provincial Park.

== See also ==
- Roads in Saskatchewan
- Transportation in Saskatchewan
