= Emma Lake, Saskatchewan =

Hamlet in Saskatchewan, Canada

Emma Lake
- Unincorporated place
- Location in Saskatchewan Emma Lake (Canada)
- Coordinates: 53.5667°N 105.8838°W
- Country: Canada
- Province: Saskatchewan
- Census division: 15
- Rural municipality: Lakeland No. 521
- Highway(s): Highway 263
- Waterway(s): Emma Lake

Emma Lake is an unincorporated place in the Canadian province of Saskatchewan.

== Geography ==
Emma Lake is in north-central Saskatchewan within the District of Lakeland No. 521. It shares the southern shore of Emma Lake with the communities of Sunnyside Beach to the west and Nies Beach to the east.

== Attractions ==
Emma Lake is a recreational community with access to beaches, campgrounds, and resorts. It is also near Great Blue Heron Provincial Park. Emma Lake Golf Course is an 18-hole, par-71 course with a total of 5,787 yards, a pro shop, and a licensed restaurant.

== Transportation ==
Access to the community is from Highway 263.

== See also ==
- List of communities in Saskatchewan
- Emma Lake Artists' Workshops
