= Christopher Lake =

Village in Saskatchewan, Canada

- Village
- Village of Christopher Lake
- Location within Saskatchewan Location within Canada
- Coordinates: 53.5400°N 105.794°W
- Country: Canada
- Province: Saskatchewan
- Region: Central
- Census division: 15
- Rural municipality: Lakeland No. 521

Government
  - Type: Urban municipality
  - Mayor: Denis Daughton
  - Administrator: Jeannie Rip

Area
  - Total: 4.56 km^{2} (1.76 sq mi)

Population (2016)
  - Total: 289
  - Density: 63.3/km^{2} (164/sq mi)
- Time zone: UTC-6 (CST)
- Postal code: S0J 0N0
- Area code: 306
- Highways: CanAm Highway / Highway 2 / Highway 263
- Railways: None
- Website: Village of Christopher Lake

Christopher Lake (2016 population: 289) is a village in the Canadian province of Saskatchewan within the District of Lakeland No. 521 and Census Division No. 15. The village lies in the boreal forest of central Saskatchewan, 2 kilometres (1.2 mi) south and east of a large lake of the same name (Christopher Lake). The village is approximately 40 kilometres (25 mi) north of the city of Prince Albert and about 5 kilometres (3.1 mi) east of its partner resort area of Emma Lake, west of the junction of Highway 2 and Highway 263.

== History ==
Christopher Lake incorporated as a village on March 1, 1985.

== Demographics ==
Population history (1986–2016)
Year	Pop.	±%
1986	199	—
1991	199	+0.0%
1996	200	+0.5%
2001	230	+15.0%
2006	215	−6.5%
2011	266	+23.7%
2016	289	+8.6%
Source: Statistics Canada via Saskatchewan Bureau of Statistics

In the 2021 Census of Population conducted by Statistics Canada, Christopher Lake had a population of 302 living in 117 of its 147 total private dwellings, a change of 4.5% from its 2016 population of 289. With a land area of 4.59 km^{2} (1.77 sq mi), it had a population density of 65.8/km^{2} (170.4/sq mi) in 2021.

In the 2016 Census of Population, the Village of Christopher Lake recorded a population of 289 living in 114 of its 138 total private dwellings, a 2.8% change from its 2011 population of 281. With a land area of 4.56 km^{2} (1.76 sq mi), it had a population density of 63.4/km^{2} (164.1/sq mi) in 2016.

== See also ==
- List of communities in Saskatchewan
- List of villages in Saskatchewan
