= Waskesiu Lake, Saskatchewan =

Community in Saskatchewan, Canada

Waskesiu Lake Waskesiu
- Unincorporated community
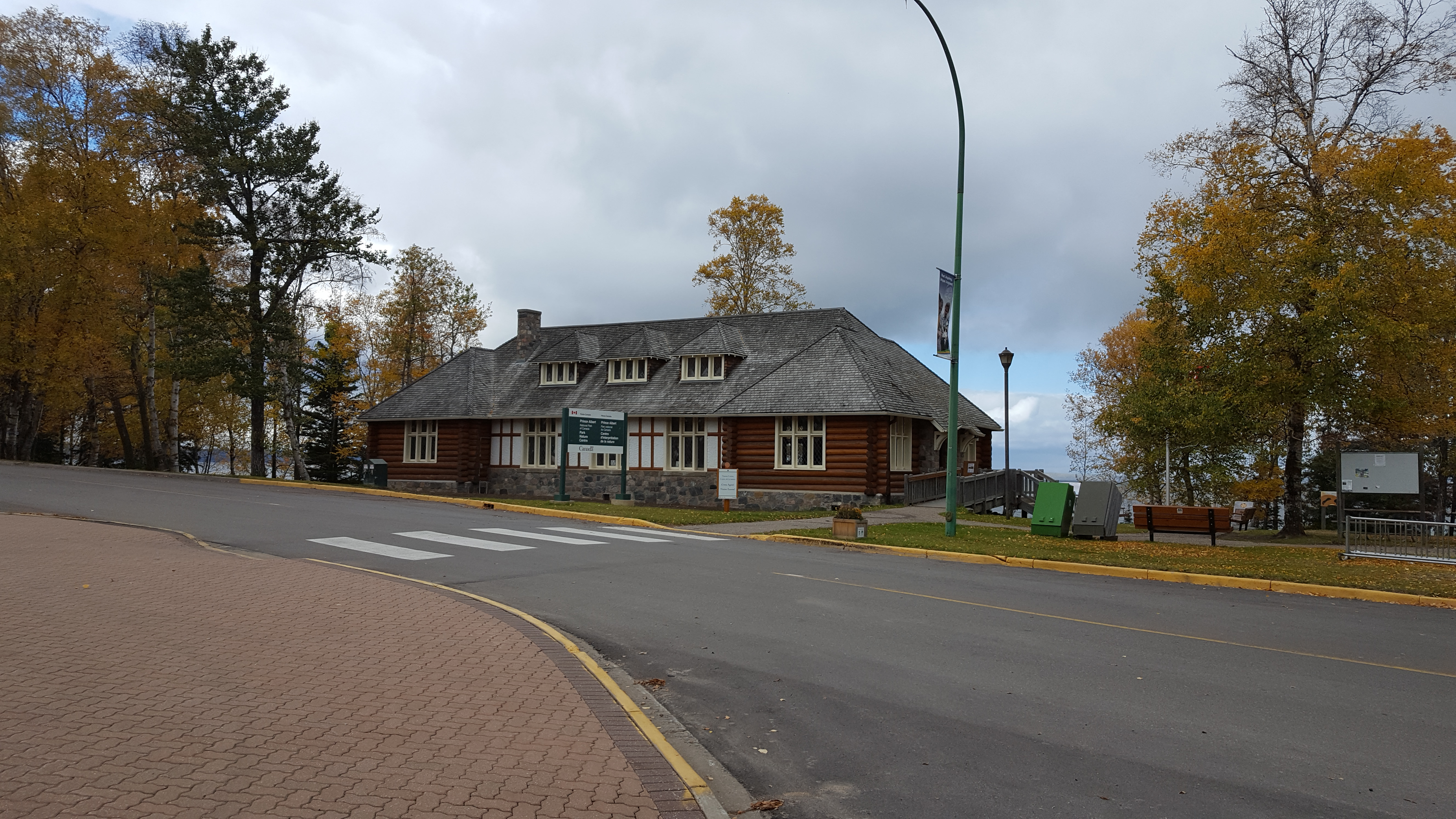
- Nature Centre

- Location within Saskatchewan Location within Canada
- Coordinates: 53°55′0″N 106°5′2″W
- Country: Canada
- Province: Saskatchewan
- Census division: 18
- Rural Municipality: Prince Albert National Park

Government
  - Type: Unincorporated
  - Governing body: Parks Canada

Population (2011)
  - Total: 10
- Time zone: CST
- Postal code: S0J 2Y0
- Area code: 306
- Highways: Hwy 263, Hwy 264

Waskesiu Lake, also referred to as Waskesiu, is a hamlet in Prince Albert National Park, Saskatchewan, Canada. The hamlet is the only community within the park, located on the southern shore of Waskesiu Lake, is about 90 km (56 mi) north of Prince Albert.

Most facilities and services one would expect to find in a multi-use park are available, such as souvenir shops, small grocery stores, restaurants, hotels and motels, rental cabins, campgrounds, three marinas, many beaches, picnic areas, tennis courts, lawn bowling greens, a gas station, laundromat, Royal Canadian Mounted Police (RCMP) detachment, and a small movie theatre (which adds showings on rainy and cold days). The facilities and services combine recreational and nature experiences. Notably, the park contains the Waskesiu Golf Course designed by famed golf course architect Stanley Thompson who also designed the course in Banff National Park.

== Demographics ==
In 2011, Waskesiu had a population of 10 year-round residents.

== Climate ==
Waskesiu experiences a humid continental climate (Köppen Dfb) bordering on a subarctic climate (Dfc). The highest temperature ever recorded in Waskesiu was 36.5 °C (98 °F) on 5 June 1988. The coldest temperature ever recorded was −48.3 °C (−55 °F) on 21 January 1935.

Climate data for Waskesiu Lake, 1981−2010 normals, extremes 1934–present
Month	Jan	Feb	Mar	Apr	May	Jun	Jul	Aug	Sep	Oct	Nov	Dec	Year
Record high °C (°F)	12.1 (53.8)	15.0 (59.0)	19.0 (66.2)	27.8 (82.0)	33.5 (92.3)	36.5 (97.7)	36.1 (97.0)	35.0 (95.0)	31.7 (89.1)	28.3 (82.9)	17.5 (63.5)	10.5 (50.9)	36.5 (97.7)
Mean daily maximum °C (°F)	−11.7 (10.9)	−6.3 (20.7)	−1.0 (30.2)	8.8 (47.8)	15.1 (59.2)	19.9 (67.8)	23.5 (74.3)	21.7 (71.1)	15.5 (59.9)	7.5 (45.5)	−2.4 (27.7)	−8.0 (17.6)	6.9 (44.4)
Daily mean °C (°F)	−16.5 (2.3)	−11.8 (10.8)	−7.0 (19.4)	2.7 (36.9)	9.0 (48.2)	14.4 (57.9)	17.7 (63.9)	16.2 (61.2)	10.4 (50.7)	2.9 (37.2)	−6.1 (21.0)	−12.3 (9.9)	1.6 (34.9)
Mean daily minimum °C (°F)	−21.1 (−6.0)	−17.3 (0.9)	−12.9 (8.8)	−3.4 (25.9)	2.8 (37.0)	8.8 (47.8)	12.0 (53.6)	10.7 (51.3)	5.2 (41.4)	−1.5 (29.3)	−9.8 (14.4)	−16.5 (2.3)	−3.6 (25.5)
Record low °C (°F)	−48.3 (−54.9)	−47.0 (−52.6)	−40.0 (−40.0)	−30.0 (−22.0)	−13.7 (7.3)	−7.8 (18.0)	−4.4 (24.1)	−3.9 (25.0)	−10.0 (14.0)	−23.0 (−9.4)	−35.0 (−31.0)	−42.2 (−44.0)	−48.3 (−54.9)
Average precipitation mm (inches)	15.6 (0.61)	16.0 (0.63)	21.7 (0.85)	27.0 (1.06)	46.9 (1.85)	71.3 (2.81)	86.1 (3.39)	64.7 (2.55)	57.9 (2.28)	31.3 (1.23)	19.0 (0.75)	22.2 (0.87)	479.7 (18.89)
Average rainfall mm (inches)	0.02 (0.00)	0.3 (0.01)	5.5 (0.22)	18.5 (0.73)	45.6 (1.80)	71.3 (2.81)	86.1 (3.39)	64.7 (2.55)	57.5 (2.26)	22.5 (0.89)	3.5 (0.14)	0.0 (0.0)	375.4 (14.78)
Average snowfall cm (inches)	13.5 (5.3)	17.1 (6.7)	15.6 (6.1)	8.5 (3.3)	1.3 (0.5)	0.0 (0.0)	0.0 (0.0)	0.0 (0.0)	0.4 (0.2)	8.8 (3.5)	15.6 (6.1)	23.5 (9.3)	104.2 (41.0)
Source: Environment Canada

== See also ==
- List of communities in Saskatchewan
- List of place names in Canada of Indigenous origin
