= Anglin Bay =

Bay in Ontario, Canada

Coordinates: 44.2391°N 76.4797°W

Anglin Bay is a small bay on the western shore of the Cataraqui River at Kingston, Ontario. It is a prominent feature of the Kingston, Ontario Inner Harbour. The bay was named for the Anglin Company whose offices, lumber yard and mill were continuously located on the shore of the bay from 1865 to 1999. The S. Anglin Fuel Company was originally a timber company, incorporated in Kingston in 1865, which gradually worked its way through building materials and lumber, coal, and oil as home heating fuels changed over the years. Timber was originally transported by the Cataraqui River, and later by the Kingston and Pembroke Railway, a now-defunct Canadian Pacific line.

Robert Anglin (1806–1874) was a Common Councilman for the Town of Kingston in 1843, at the same time that John A. Macdonald was an Alderman on the Town Council. He had emigrated from County Cork, Ireland to Kingston in 1829, leaving Ireland with his wife on his wedding day. His sons W. B. and S. Anglin established the Anglin company as a sawmill at Wellington and Bay streets, at the mouth of the Cataraqui River, employing 23 people by 1850. Coal was soon added as a sideline, gradually displaced by fuel oil from 1953 onward. Anglin once handled a quarter million tons a year of heating and industrial coal and operated substantial lumber, drydock and shipbuilding facilities. In the 1950s, a custom carpentry shop employed 60-70 workers. The last Anglin lumber was sold in 1979. The company remained within the Anglin family until 1997. Its successor, heating company Tri-Heat Anglin Energy Supply, moved to its current Counter Street location (now John Counter Boulevard) in 1999. It was acquired in the early 2000s by local competitor Rosen Fuels and operated as Rosen TriHeat Anglin Fuels until 2012, ultimately becoming Rosen Energy Group.

Other industrial occupants included Canadian Dredge and Dock, whose scows and dredges joined the wharves, quays, and buildings along the rail lines. The facilities expanded as landfill into the harbour. Various shipwrecks remain visible in Anglin Bay; many of these ships belonged to the former Montreal Transportation Company shipyard at the entrance to Anglin Bay or to Canada Steamship Lines of Montreal. The industrial role of this waterfront area has diminished as railways have been removed from the Inner Harbour and waterfront, with much of the railway land used for Ontario Health Insurance Plan offices in the early 1980s.
