= Los Anglin, West Virginia =

- Unincorporated community
- Location within the state of West Virginia Los Anglin (the United States)
- Coordinates: 39°3′47″N 80°27′15″W
- Country: United States
- State: West Virginia
- County: Lewis
- Elevation: 1,020 ft (310 m)
- Time zone: UTC-5 (Eastern (EST))
  - Summer (DST): UTC-4 (EDT)
- GNIS ID: 1728625

Los Anglin is an unincorporated community in Lewis County, West Virginia, United States.
