= Elk Ridge, Saskatchewan =

Resort village in Saskatchewan, Canada

Elk Ridge
- Resort village
- Resort Village of Elk Ridge
- Location within Saskatchewan Location within Canada
- Coordinates: 53.893°N 105.990°W
- Country: Canada
- Province: Saskatchewan
- Census division: 15
- Rural municipality: Lakeland No. 521
- Designated (organized hamlet): January 22, 2016
- Forthcoming incorporation (resort village): January 1, 2022

Population (2021)
  - Total: 128
  - Municipal census: 112 (2,019)
- Time zone: UTC-6 (CST)
- Area code: 306
- Highway: 264

Elk Ridge (population: 128) is a resort village in the District of Lakeland No. 521, Saskatchewan, Canada. It is on Highway 264 approximately 76 kilometres (47 mi) north of Prince Albert and 201 kilometres (125 mi) north of Saskatoon.

== History ==
Elk Ridge was established as an organized hamlet on January 31, 2016. On June 10, 2021, an order was approved to incorporate Elk Ridge as a resort village effective January 1, 2022.

== Demographics ==
According to Statistics Canada, Elk Ridge had a population of 128 in 2021.

A municipal census conducted in 2019 counted 112 permanent residents, 371 seasonal residents, and 203 temporary residents.

== Government ==
The election of the first council for the Resort Village of Elk Ridge will occur on September 4, 2021.
