= Murray Point =

Hamlet in Saskatchewan, Canada

Coordinates: 53°37′00″N 105°56′02″W

Location of Murray Point in Saskatchewan

Murray Point is a hamlet in the Canadian province of Saskatchewan. The community is located on the western shore of Emma Lake and surrounded by Great Blue Heron Provincial Park.

== See also ==
- List of communities in Saskatchewan
- Emma Lake Artists' Workshops
