= Guises Beach =

Locality in Saskatchewan, Canada

Coordinates: 53.354°N 105.541°W

Location of Guises Beach in Saskatchewan

Guises Beach is a locality in the Canadian province of Saskatchewan. It is located on the western shore of Emma Lake.

== See also ==
- List of communities in Saskatchewan
