= Montreal Lake 106B =

Indian reserve in Saskatchewan, Canada

Coordinates: 53°31′54″N 106°00′14″W

- Indian reserve
- Montreal Lake Indian Reserve No. 106B
- Location in Saskatchewan
- First Nation: Montreal Lake
- Country: Canada
- Province: Saskatchewan

Area
  - Total: 2,331.7 ha (5,762 acres)

Population (2016)
  - Total: 442
  - Density: 19.0/km^{2} (49.1/sq mi)
- Community Well-Being Index: 47

Montreal Lake 106B is an Indian reserve of the Montreal Lake Cree Nation in Saskatchewan. It is adjacent to Little Red River 106C and about 39 kilometres (24 mi) north of Prince Albert. In the 2016 Canadian Census, it recorded a population of 442 living in 113 of its 118 total private dwellings. In the same year, its Community Well-Being index was calculated at 47 of 100, compared to 58.4 for the average First Nations community and 77.5 for the average non-Indigenous community.

== See also ==
- List of Indian reserves in Saskatchewan
