= McIntosh Point =

Hamlet in Saskatchewan, Canada

Coordinates: 53°36′00″N 105°54′02″W

Location of McIntosh Point in Saskatchewan

McIntosh Point is a hamlet in the Canadian province of Saskatchewan. It is located at McIntosh Point on the western shore of Emma Lake.

== See also ==
- List of communities in Saskatchewan
