= Okema Beach =

Hamlet in Saskatchewan, Canada

Coordinates: 53°36′00″N 105°57′02″W

Location of Okema Beach in Saskatchewan

Okema Beach is a hamlet in the Canadian province of Saskatchewan. It is located on the shore of Emma Lake adjacent to Great Blue Heron Provincial Park.

== See also ==
- List of communities in Saskatchewan
