= Nies Beach =

Hamlet in Saskatchewan, Canada

- Hamlet
- Interactive map of Nies Beach
- Coordinates: 53°34′17″N 105°51′24″W
- Country: Canada
- Province: Saskatchewan
- Rural municipality: Lakeland No. 521
- Time zone: UTC−6 (CST)

Nies Beach is a hamlet in the Canadian province of Saskatchewan. It is located at the south-east corner of Emma Lake.

== See also ==
- List of communities in Saskatchewan
