= Stoplogs =

Elements of floodgates to adjust water level and discharge

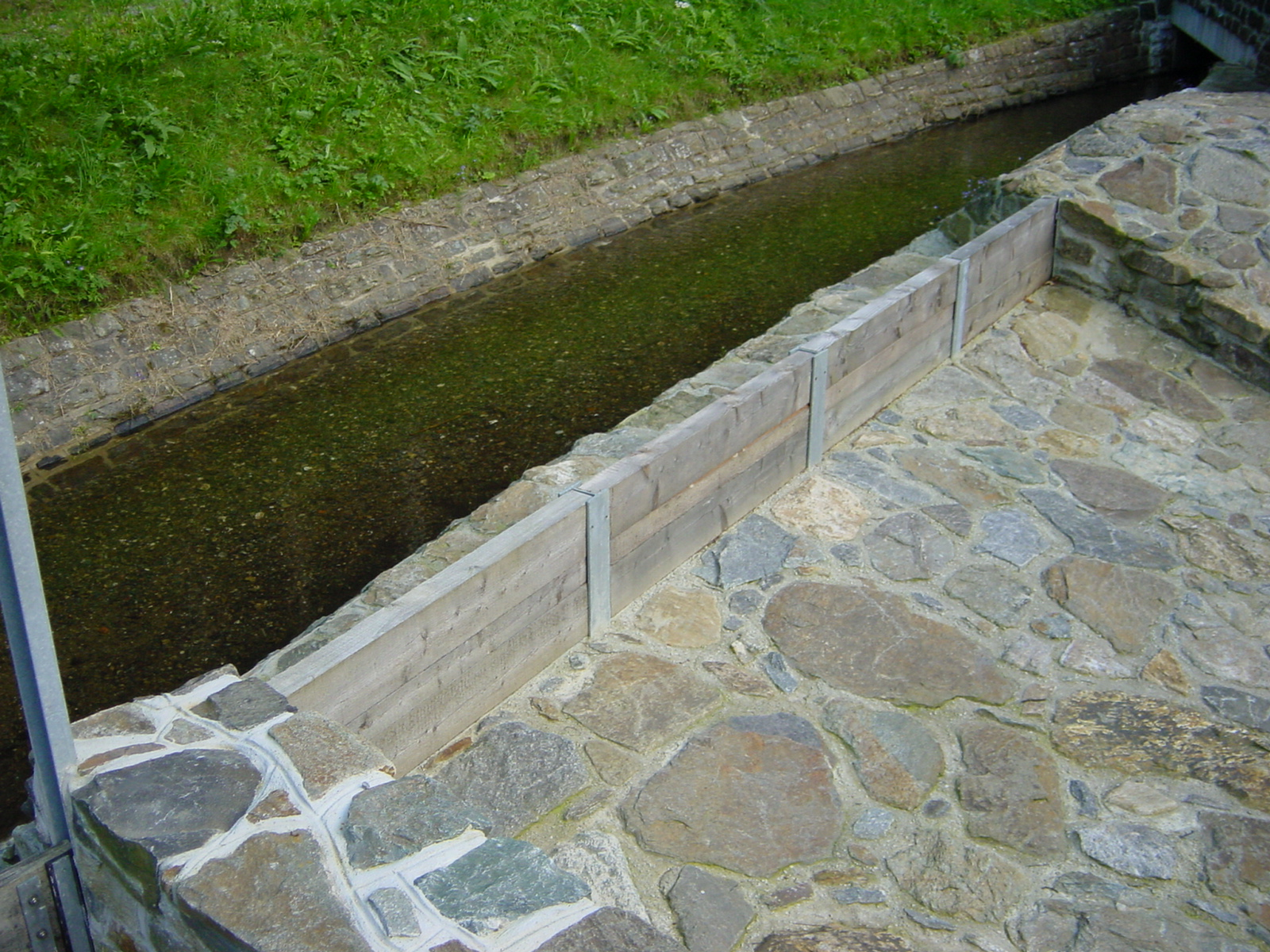
Small stoplogs

Stoplogs are hydraulic engineering control elements that are used in floodgates to adjust the water level or discharge in a river, canal, or reservoir. Stoplogs are designed to cut off or stop flow through a conduit. They are typically long rectangular timber beams or boards that are placed on top of each other and dropped into premade slots inside a weir, gate, or channel. Present day, the process of adding and removing stoplogs is not manual, but done with hydraulic stoplog lifters and hoists. Since the height of the barrier can only be adjusted through the addition and removal of stoplogs, finding a lighter and stronger material other than wood or concrete became a more desirable choice. Other materials, including steel and composites, can be used as stoplogs as well. Stoplogs are sometimes confused with flashboards, as both elements are used in bulkhead or crest gates.

== Usage ==
Unused stoplogs stacked on top of the flow control structure at Mendota Pool on the San Joaquin River, California.

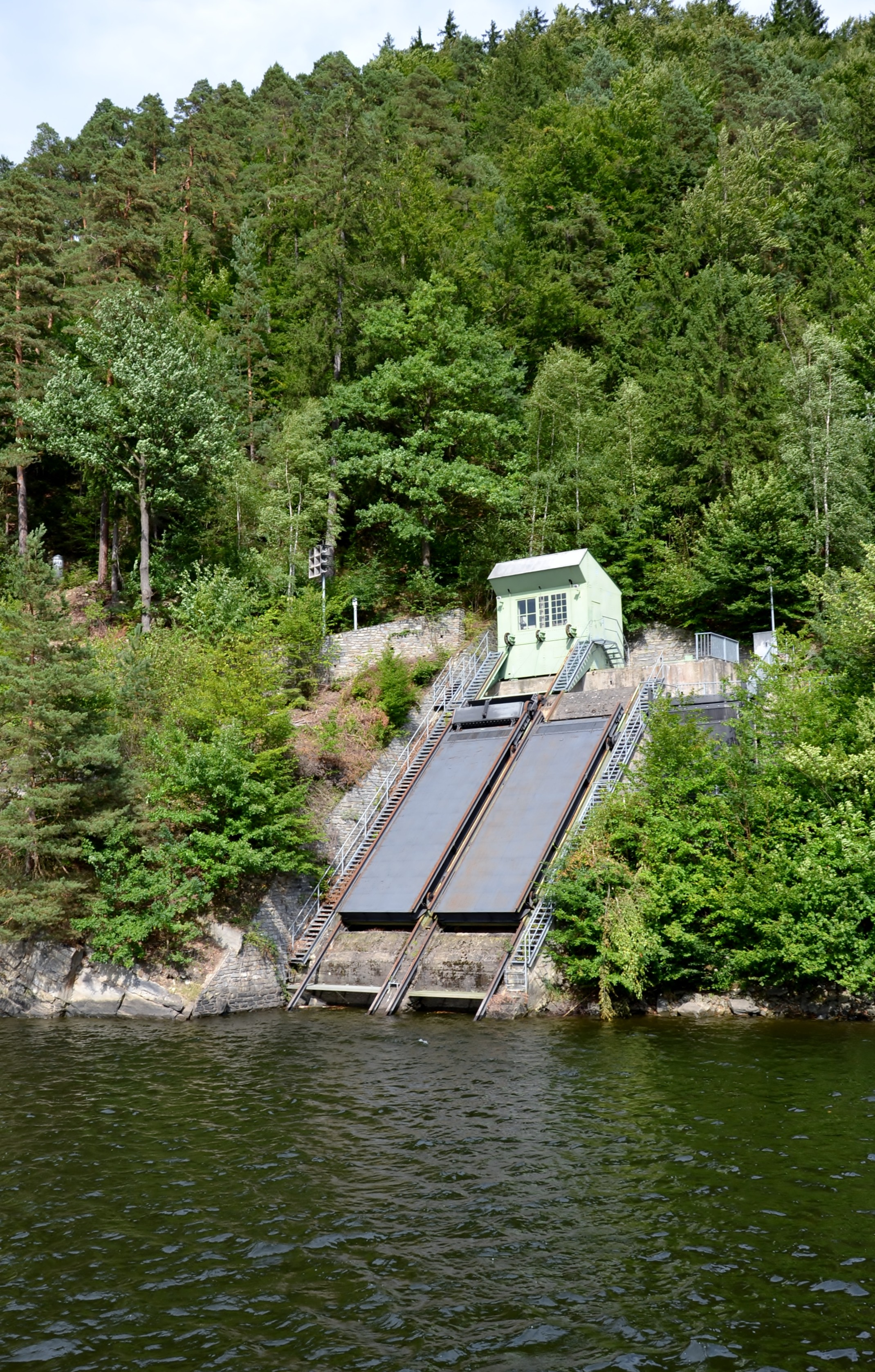
Stoplogs of a hydro power plant which can close the water flow to the turbine

Stoplogs are modular in nature, giving the operator of a gated structure the ability to control the water level in a channel by adding or removing individual stoplogs. A gate may make use of one or more logs. Each log is lowered horizontally into a space or bay between two grooved piers referred to as a stoplog check. In larger gate structures, there will be multiple bays in which stoplogs can be placed to better control the discharge through the structure.

Stoplogs are frequently used to temporarily block flow through a spillway or canal during routine maintenance. At other times stoplogs can be used over longer periods of times, such as when a field is flooded and stoplogs are being used in smaller gates in order to control the depth of water in fields. The logs may be left in and adjusted during the entire time that the field is submerged.

In most cases, the boards used are subjected to high flow conditions. As individual stoplogs begin to age they are replaced. Typically small amounts of water will leak between individual logs.

Stoplogs are typically used in structures where the removal, installation, and replacement of the logs is expected infrequently. When larger flows of water are passing through a stoplog gate, it can be difficult to remove or place individual logs. Larger logs often require multiple people to position and lift the logs.

== Stoplogs vs. flashboards ==
Sometimes engineers will use these two terms interchangeably by calling a stoplog a flashboard. This is done in part because unlike many other types of bulkhead gates that are one continuous unit, both stoplogs and flashboards are modular and can be easily designed to hold back water at varying levels. However, most engineering texts and design firms differentiate between the two structures. Stoplogs are specialized bulkheads that are dropped into premade slots or guides in a channel or control structure, while flashboards are bulkheads that are placed on the crest or top of a channel wall or control structure. Flashboards are sometimes designed to break away under high flow conditions and thus to provide only a temporary diversion. In contrast, stoplogs are intended to be reused, and failure of a stoplog will result in an uncontrolled flow through a gate.

== Handstops ==
Smaller stoplogs are sometimes referred to as handstops. Handstops are used in smaller gated structures, such as irrigation delivery ditches or the gates used to control water depth in larger submerged fields (such as rice fields). They are designed to be easily operated by a single individual.
