= Great Blue Heron Provincial Park =

Provincial park in Saskatchewan, Canada

- Location within Saskatchewan Location within Canada
- Location: Saskatchewan, Canada
- Nearest city: Prince Albert
- Coordinates: 53.5984°N 105.9221°W
- Area: 11,168 ha (27,600 acres)
- Established: 2013
- Governing body: Sask Parks

Great Blue Heron Provincial Park is a recreational park in the central region of the Canadian province of Saskatchewan in the boreal forest ecozone of Canada. It is adjacent to the eastern boundary of Prince Albert National Park, about 50 kilometres (31 mi) north of the city of Prince Albert. The provincial park was established in 2013 from two pre-existing provincial recreation sites — Emma Lake (Murray Point) and Anglin Lake Recreation Sites — and the addition of a large tract of Crown land.

Great Blue Heron Provincial Park encompasses the entirety of Oscar Lake, most of Anglin Lake, the northern portion of Emma Lake, and the very northern tip of Christopher Lake. The eastern slopes of Waskesiu Hills are in the western side of the park. Access to the park is from Highway 953.

Within the park's boundaries are three small communities — Okema Beach, Murray Point, and Anglin Lake. Murray Point is home to Emma Lake Artists' Workshops.

== Activities and amenities ==
Great Blue Heron Provincial Park has a wide variety of activities and amenities, including camping, swimming, hiking, picnicking, disk golf, boating, fishing, and, in the winter, snowmobiling, cross-country skiing, and snowshoeing.

=== Accommodations ===
There are over 300 campsites in the park spread over several campgrounds. Murray Point Campground, which is part of the original Emma Lake (Murray Point) Recreation Site, has 130 campsites with amenities such as washrooms and showers, potable water, and electric hook-ups. North of Murray Point Campground is North Murray Point Campground, which has 33 campsites with electric hook-ups available. Both campsites have access to Emma Lake and its beaches and boat launch. Located on Anglin Lake, Anderson Point Campground has 60 campsites with electric hook-ups, washrooms and showers, a Mongolian yurt, and lake access. Besides the aforementioned main campgrounds, there are several group campsites including North Anglin, Spruce River, and Heron's Hideaway.

Land of the Loon Resort is located on Anglin Lake. The resort has year-round accommodations that include modern cabins, chalets, and studio rooms.

=== Trails ===
There are several different trail systems of varying lengths located throughout the Great Blue Heron Provincial Park, including a 1 km (0.62 mi) spur trail that connects to Spruce River Highlands Trail in Prince Albert National Park. On north shore of Anglin Lake's Jacobsen Bay, there are about 20 kilometres (12 mi) of hiking trails and by the Anderson Point Campground there are several shorter trails. Historic Anderson Cabin is west of the campground and is accessible from an interpretive trail. Emma Lake also has several trails, such as the 5-km Valley View Trail and the 2-km Murray Point Trail.

ATVs are only permitted on designated trails and all ATV trails are multi-use. Throughout the park, about 50 km (31 mi) are snowmobile trails and a further 20 km (12 mi) of trails are groomed for cross-country skiing.

=== Fishing ===
Fishing is a common recreational activity in the park on the two main lakes. Fish species such as northern pike, walleye, and yellow perch are commonly found in the lakes. Several boat launches and docks provide access to the lake and boat rentals are available at Jacobsen Bay Outfitters store, which is located at Land of the Loon Resort on Anglin Lake.

== See also ==
- List of protected areas of Saskatchewan
- Emma Lake Artists' Workshops
- Tourism in Saskatchewan
