= Anglin Lake, Saskatchewan =

Unincorporated community in Saskatchewan, Canada

Coordinates: 53°42′15″N 105°57′21″W

Location of Anglin Lake in Saskatchewan

Anglin Lake is an unincorporated community in the central region of the Canadian province of Saskatchewan. The community is located on the eastern shore of Anglin Lake and is surrounded by Great Blue Heron Provincial Park.

== See also ==
- List of communities in Saskatchewan
