= Stevens Boys Rifles =

Single-shot rifle

- Type: Single-shot
- Place of origin: United States

Production history
- Designed: Prior to 1890
- Manufacturer: Stevens Arms
- Unit cost: $2.25 (in 1902) equivalent to $80 in 2020 (Crack Shot). $4.00 (in 1902) equivalent to $150 in 2020 (Favorite). $7.00 (in 1902) equivalent to $250 in 2020 (Ideal).
- Produced: 1890–1943
- No. built: ~250,000
- Variants: See Variants

Specifications
- Mass: 3.35 lb (1.52 kg) (Crack Shot, 20 in barrel)
- Barrel length: 20 in (508.0 mm) Round barrel (Crack Shot); 24 in (609.6 mm) 1/3 Octagon barrel (Favorite)
- Cartridge: .22 Short (Favorite).22 Long Rifle (Crack Shot, Favorite).25 Rimfire, (Favorite).32 Rimfire (Favorite)
- Action: Falling-block action
- Sights: Open front and rear sights, non-adjustable (Crack Shot, Favorite); Rear peep and globe front sights (Favorite)

The Stevens Boys Rifles were a series of single-shot takedown rifles produced by Stevens Arms from 1890 until 1943. The rifles used a falling-block action (sometimes called a tilting-block, dropping-block, or drop-block) and were chambered in a variety of rimfire calibers, such as .22 Short, .22 Long Rifle, .25 Rimfire, and .32 Rimfire.

== History ==
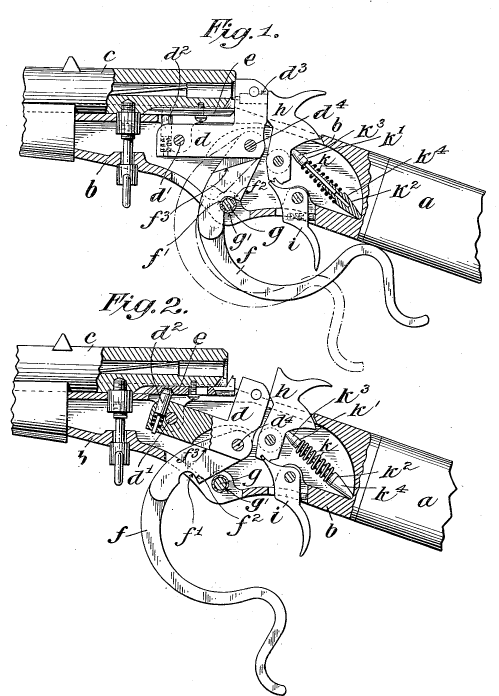
Patent No. 1,059,477 illustrating the lever mechanism used on Stevens Boys Rifles after 1912.

In 1890, Stevens Arms released its first "Boys Rifle" (a term referring to an inexpensive rifle marketed towards children) known as the Crack Shot. This rifle would undergo at least two revisions during its production lifespan. At its introduction, the breechblock was actuated with a lever found on the side of the rifle, a system that would remain on the Crack Shot until 1912. At this point, a new version of the Crack Shot (designated the No. 26) was produced, featuring both a redesigned action and the familiar under-lever. The Crack Shot would remain unchanged until produced ceased in 1939, with the exception of a brief production run of a modified Crack Shot in 1943.

In 1902, Stevens Arms filed a patent for the takedown mechanism that would be used on the Boys Rifles.

The No. 14 Little Scout was produced from 1906 to 1910, during which time one shortcoming of the Boys Rifle design was addressed: the rifles were only initially equipped with an extractor, but no ejector. This meant that a casing would be partially removed from the chamber upon actuation of the lever, but would not be ejected out of the chamber and away from the rifle. Instead, the user was required to remove the casing from the chamber with their fingers. In 1909, a patent from Stevens Arms sought to remedy this with the inclusion of an ejector proper which would quickly and sharply snap rearwards to throw an empty cartridge out of the chamber.

== Design ==
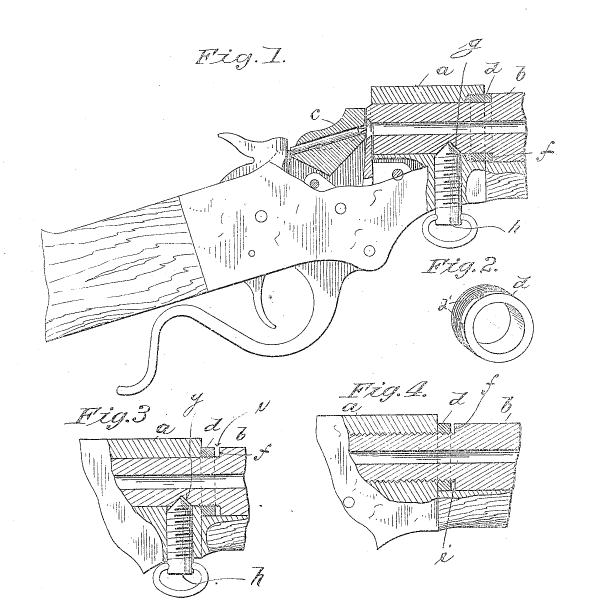
Patent drawing of the takedown mechanism used on Stevens Arms Boys Rifles.

The Stevens Boys Rifles were all similar in that they were single-shot rimfire rifles with falling-block actions and could be easily taken down into two-halves with the removal of a knurled thumb screw on the bottom of the receiver. The rifles were equipped with an oval-shape walnut or walnut-varnished stock and steel butt plate.

== Models ==
A wide number of different models and variations of Boys Rifles were produced over their production lifespan.

Model Name	Available caliber(s)	Barrel Length	Twist Rate	Notes	Production Date
No. 12 Marksman	.22LR, .25 Rimfire, .32 Rimfire	22 in (558.8 mm) barrel	1:25" (.22LR)		
No. 14 Little Scout	.22RF	18 in (457.2 mm) round barrel	"	One-piece slab stock	1906 to 1910
Little Scout No. 14 1/2	"	18 in (457.2 mm) or 20 in (508.0 mm) barrel	"	Open rear sight with front blade sight. Forearm is small and tapered.	
Crack Shot	.22LR, .32 Rimfire	20 in (508.0 mm) round barrel	"	Early model that actuates the falling-block by means of a side-lever instead of an under lever.	1890–1912
Crack Shot No. 26	.22LR, .32 Rimfire	18 in (457.2 mm) or 22 in (558.8 mm) barrel.	"	Later model of the Crack Shot that uses the under lever that would be ubiquitous on all subsequent Stevens Boys Rifles.	1912–1943
Crack Shot No. 26 1/2	.22LR Shot Cartridges, .32 Rimfire Shot Cartridges	"	N/A	Same as Crack Shot No. 26 but with a smoothbore barrel. Intended for shot cartridges.	
Favorite No. 17	.22LR Shot Cartridges, .32 Rimfire Shot Cartridges	24 in (609.6 mm) round barrel	1:25"(.22LR)	Open rear sight, Rocky Mountain front sight. Plain stock with straight-grip. Forearm is small and tapered.	1894–1935
Favorite No. 18	"	"	"	Same as Model 17, but sights consist of a Vernier peep sight, leaf middle sight, and Beach combination front sight.	
Favorite No. 19	"	"	"	Same as Model 17, but sights consist of a Lyman combination rear sight, leaf middle sight, and Lyman front sight.	
No. 20 Favorite	"	"	N/A	Same as Model 17, but featured a smoothbore barrel.	
No. 27 Favorite	"	24 in (609.6 mm) octagon barrel	1:25" (.22LR)	Same as Model 17, but with an octagon barrel.	
No. 28 Favorite	"	"	"	Same as Model 18, but with an octagon barrel.	
No. 29 Favorite	"	"	"	Same as Model 18, but with an octagon barrel.	
No. 71 Favorite	.22LR	22 in (558.8 mm) full octagon barrel	"	Open rear sight, brass front blade sight. Straight-grip stock with Schnabel forend and commemorative brass medallion inlaid in the stock. Brass crescent-shaped buttplate.	

== Safety ==
=== Use of high-velocity ammunition ===
Because the Stevens Boys Rifles predate modern high-velocity ammunition such as CCI Stingers and Velocitors, it is conceivable that the actions were not designed or intended to be used with any ammunition producing a chamber pressure beyond what was in use at the time of their invention. Using ammunition that produces a higher chamber pressure than an action is capable of withstanding could lead to damage to the firearm, or even a dangerous and catastrophic failure of the action.

=== Excessive headspace ===
Rifles of this kind (including for example the BSA No. 12/15 and 15) can develop excessive headspace due to gradual wear on the locking shoulders of the breechblock and the locking arms on the finger lever. This results in an action that does not close tightly, therefore failing to support the (typically brass) cartridge case properly. Cases that are unsupported are free to expand beyond their intended dimensional limit, leading to weakened, deformed, or even ruptured casings. The rupturing of an unsupported case releases hot, high pressure gases rearward towards the shooter and bystanders, leading to serious injury or even death.
