= Mossberg MC1sc =

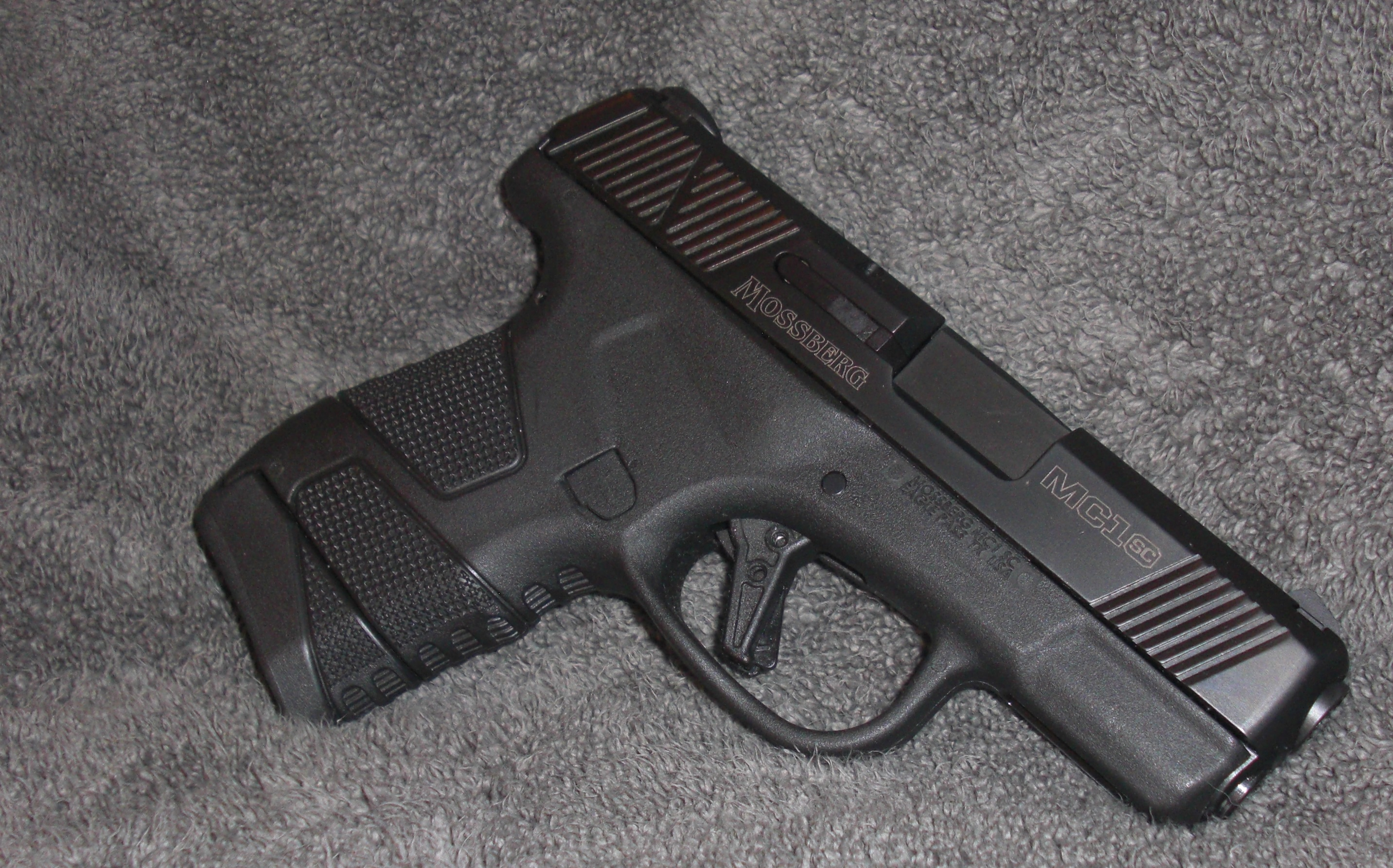
- Mossberg MC1sc with 7-round extended magazine loaded
- Type: Semi-automatic pistol
- Place of origin: United States

Production history
- Manufacturer: O.F. Mossberg & Sons
- Produced: 2019–2025
- Variants: MC2c

Specifications
- Mass: 19 oz (540 g) (unloaded); 22 oz (620 g) (loaded)
- Length: 6.25 in (159 mm)
- Barrel length: 3.40 in (86 mm)
- Width: 1.03 in (26 mm)
- Height: 4.30 in (109 mm)
- Cartridge: 9×19mm Parabellum
- Rate of fire: Semi-Automatic
- Feed system: Box magazines: 6-round magazine (flush-fit); 7-round magazine (extended)
- Sights: White 3-dot (standard); Tritium (optional)

The Mossberg MC1sc is a semi-automatic subcompact handgun introduced by O.F. Mossberg & Sons in January 2019. Chambered in 9×19mm Parabellum and rated for +P pressure, it is the company's first handgun offering since the Mossberg Brownie was introduced 100 years prior.

== Features ==
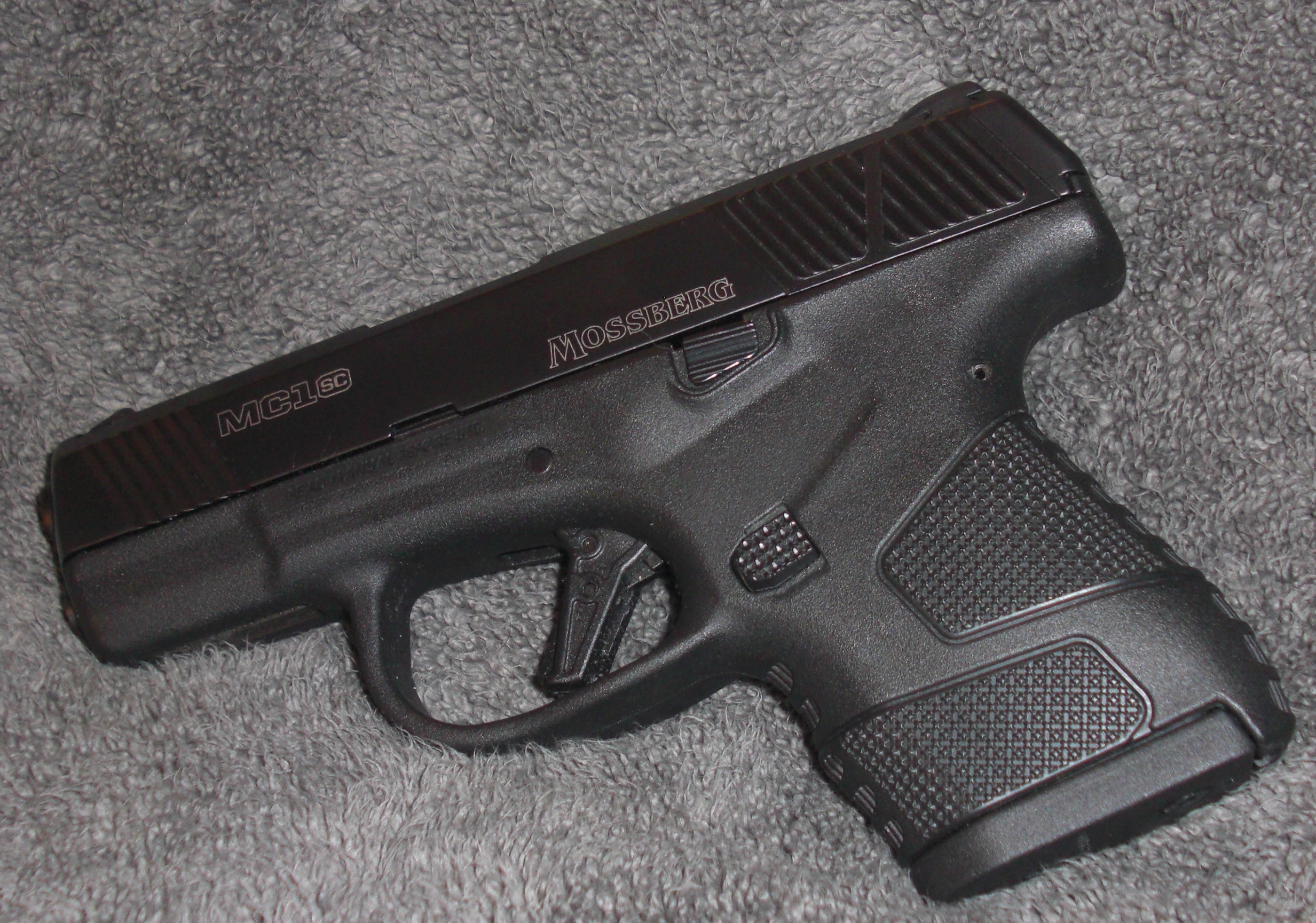
Mossberg MC1sc with 6-round flush magazine loaded

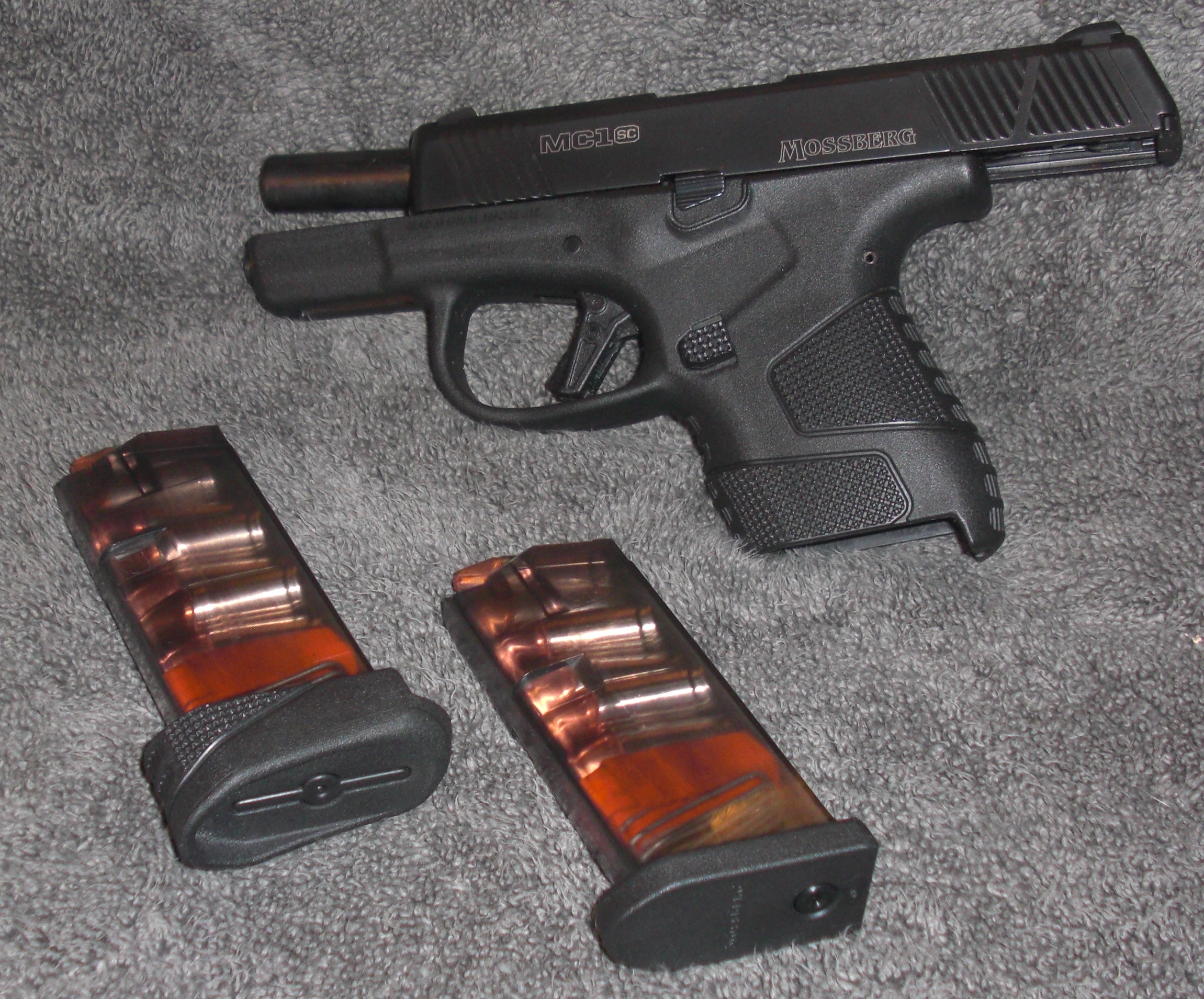
Mossberg MC1sc with slide locked back and loaded magazine. The clear polymer magazine allows the user to easily see how many rounds are loaded. The orange follower is visible.

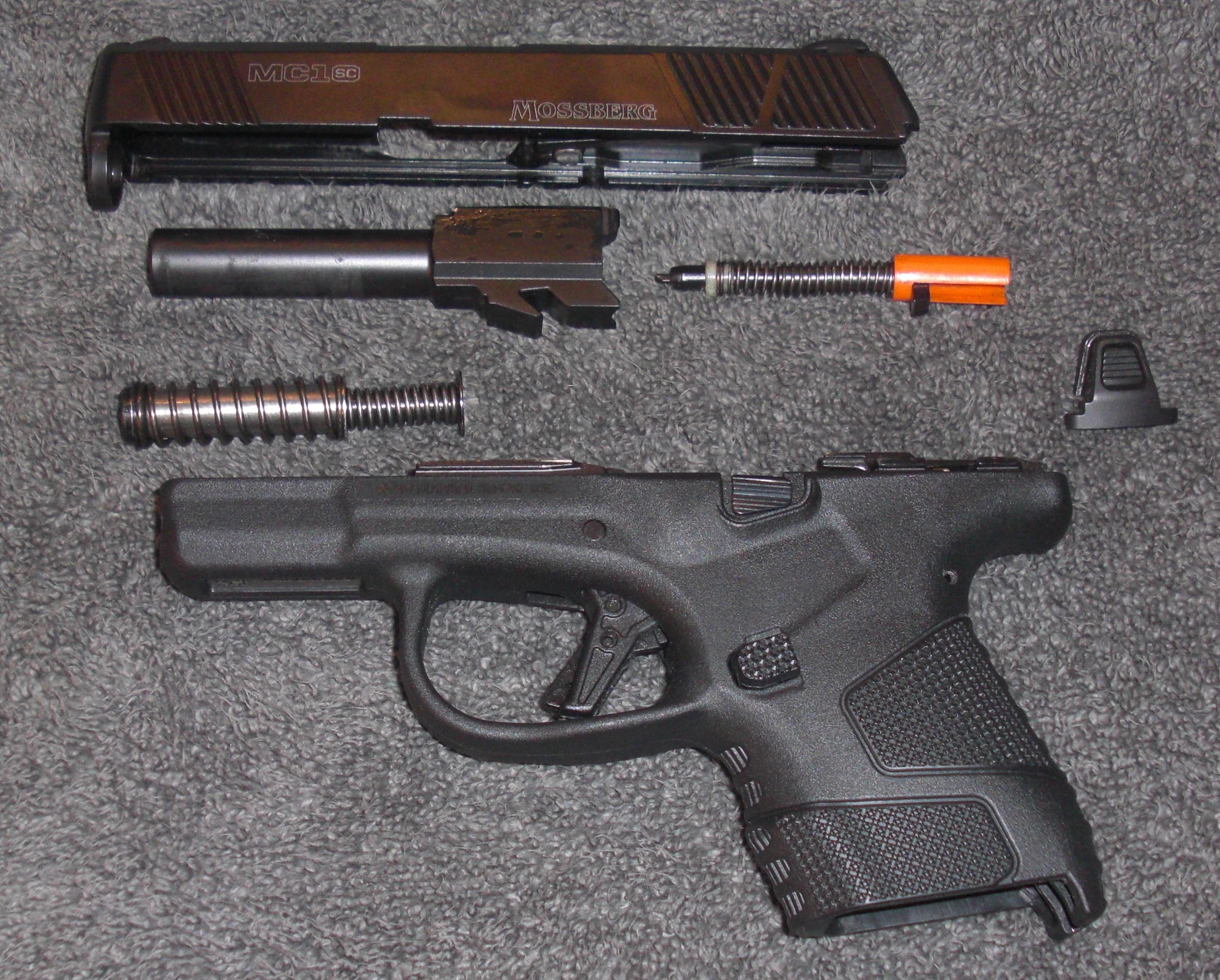
Mossberg MC1sc field-stripped

The MC1sc is a striker-fired polymer frame pistol, featuring an integrated blade safety on the trigger. Its standard three-dot sights are adjustable, both front and rear, with night sights available as an option. Trigger pull is rated at 6 lbf (27 N).

The standard slide is stainless steel, with "diamond-like carbon coating" available as an option. Disassembling the pistol for cleaning does not require pulling the trigger, as Mossberg's "safe takedown system" allows the striker assembly to be removed before removing the slide.

Several MC1sc offerings are available, including ones with a cross-bolt safety. Single-stack magazines with 6-round and 7-round capacities are available; both are made with clear polymer and have an orange floor plate. Additionally, the MC1sc will accept Glock 43 magazines. The magazine release is reversible.

== MC2c variant ==
On January 17, 2020, Mossberg introduced the MC2c, a slightly larger version of the MC1sc. The "c" designates it as a compact size pistol, as compared to the "sc" (subcompact) size of the MC1sc. The MC2c features double-stack magazines, in either 13-round (flush fit) or 15-round (extended) capacities.

Specification	MC1sc	MC2c
Barrel Length	3.4 inches (86 mm)	3.9 inches (99 mm)
Overall Length	6.25 inches (159 mm)	7.10 inches (180 mm)
Overall Width	1.03 inches (26 mm)	1.10 inches (28 mm)
Height	4.30 inches (109 mm)	4.90 inches (124 mm)
Weight (unloaded)	19 ounces (540 g)	21 ounces (600 g)
Weight (loaded)	22 ounces (620 g)	29 ounces (820 g)
Capacity (flush)	6+1 rounds	13+1 rounds
Capacity (extended)	7+1 rounds	15+1 rounds
MSRP	$425 (Jan. 2019)	$490 (Jan. 2020)
