= 9200 =

9200 may refer to:

- A.D. 9200, a year in the 10th millennium CE
- 9200 BCE, a year in the 10th millennium BC
- 9200, a number in the 9000 (number) range
- 9200 (1993 FK21), an asteroid in the Asteroid Belt, the 9200th asteroid registered; see List_of_minor_planets:_9001–10000
- Telephone area code 9200; see telephone numbers in Saudi Arabia
- ATI Radeon 9200, a computer graphics card series
- Chiba New Town Railway 9200 series, an electrical multiple unit train set series
- RTM build number of Microsoft's Windows 8 operating system
- Mossberg 9200, a 12-gauge semi-automatic shotgun
- UNIVAC 9200, a mainframe computer
