= O.F. Mossberg & Sons =

American firearms company

O. F. Mossberg & Sons, Inc.
- Type: Incorporation
- Industry: Firearms
- Founded: March 1919; 107 years ago
- Founder: Oscar Frederick Mossberg and his sons
- Headquarters: North Haven, Connecticut, U.S.
- Key people: Alan Iver Mossberg Jr. (CEO)
- Products: Firearms, scopes
- Net income: US$24,600,000
- Number of employees: 500
- Website: www.mossberg.com

O. F. Mossberg & Sons (commonly known as Mossberg) is an American firearms manufacturer, specializing in shotguns, rifles, scopes, and pistol accessories.

== Origins ==
Oscar Frederick Mossberg (1866–1937) was born on 1 September 1866, in Sweden, near the village of Svanskog in Värmland, and emigrated to the United States in 1886. Mossberg went to work at the Iver Johnson Arms & Cycle Works in Fitchburg, Massachusetts. While at Iver Johnson, Mossberg supervised the manufacture of revolvers and shotguns while contributing some of his own patented designs, including a top strap latching mechanism for the Iver Johnson safety revolver. When Mossberg left Iver Johnson, he went on to manage the small factory of the C. S. Shattuck Arms Co. in nearby Hatfield, Massachusetts, which manufactured single- and double-barrel breechloading shotguns. From there, he went to work for J. Stevens Arms & Tool Co., where he designed a small four-shot novelty pistol which he patented in his name. Working out of an old barn behind his house, Mossberg and his sons made about 500 of these four-shot pistols between 1907 and 1909. In 1914, Mossberg left Stevens, moving to New Haven, Connecticut, in order to work for Marlin-Rockwell. In 1919, when Marlin-Rockwell went out of business (they primarily made machineguns, and World War I had just ended), the unemployed 53-year-old O.F. Mossberg and his two sons, Iver and Harold, started a new firearms company of their own, O. F. Mossberg & Sons. Renting a small loft on State Street in New Haven, the Mossbergs began work on a simple four-shot .22-caliber pocket pistol, the Brownie. Marketed largely to hunters and trappers for the humane killing of wounded or trapped animals, Mossberg produced approximately 37,000 Brownie pistols from 1920 to 1932.

== Connecticut production ==
Thanks to the Brownie pistol, the Mossbergs' firearms business grew steadily, and in 1921 the company purchased a building on Greene Street in New Haven, Connecticut. In 1922, the company introduced the first of a new line of .22 rimfire Mossberg rifles, a pump-action repeater designed by Arthur E. Savage, the son of the owner of Savage Arms Corp.

After building a third factory in New Haven in 1937, Mossberg continued to produce simple, economic firearms for the civilian market. O.F. Mossberg died in 1937, and the business continued under his son Harold.

During World War II, the company made parts for Browning M2 .50-caliber heavy machine gun and for the Enfield No. 4 rifle under contract, as well as the U.S. Model 42 and Model 44 .22 caliber bolt-action rifle, which was used for preliminary small arms training for the Army and Navy.

In 1960, the company shifted production to a new facility in North Haven a few miles away. At one time, the plant employed hundreds of skilled workers, many of whom had previously worked at other well-known firearms manufacturers such as Colt's Manufacturing Company, Marlin Firearms, Smith & Wesson, and Winchester. O. F. Mossberg & Sons remains a family-owned business and is the oldest family-owned firearms manufacturer in America.

Today, while the corporate headquarters are still in North Haven, the company has moved nearly all firearms production to Eagle Pass, Texas.

== Maverick Arms ==
In 1989, faced with increased foreign competition and rising labor and production costs, Mossberg's corporate affiliate Maverick Arms opened a 40,000-square-foot (3,700 m^{2}) manufacturing plant in the Eagle Pass Industrial Park in the state of Texas. Mossberg greatly enlarged the Eagle Pass production facility in 2013 to help production and warehousing keep up with demand. With the addition of 116,000 square feet (10,800 m^{2}) of factory space, Mossberg also expanded its Texas workforce to 450 employees. Today, over 90% of all O. F. Mossberg & Sons shotguns and rifles are produced at the Eagle Pass facility.

== Production history ==
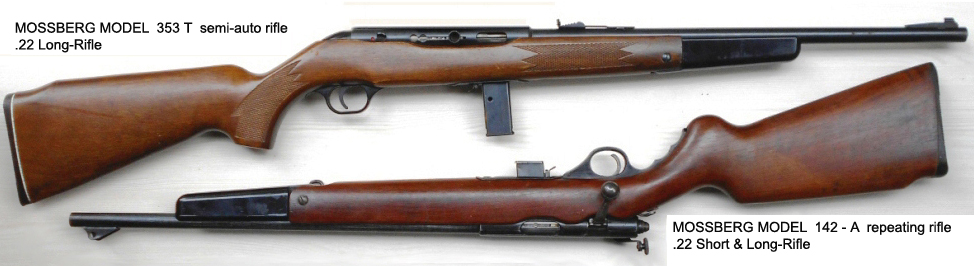
Mossberg .22 caliber post-war rifles

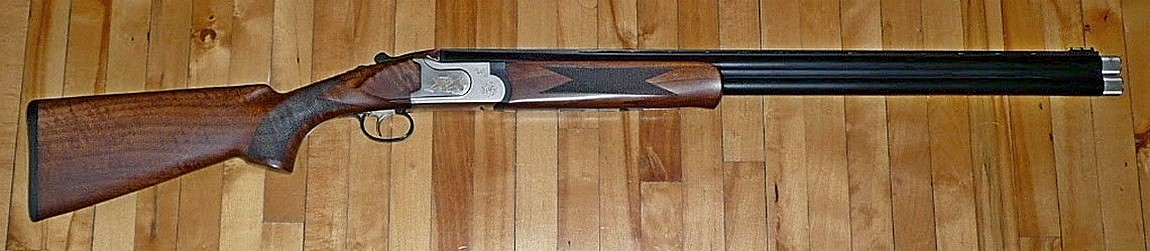
Mossberg Silver Reserve O/U Shotgun 12ga with extended chokes

Following the success of the Brownie .22 pistol, Mossberg developed a line of inexpensive .22 caliber rifles, shotguns, and rifle scopes.

From the 1940s through the 1960s, Mossberg produced a HI line of .22 caliber target and sporting rifles.

After the end of World War II, Mossberg concentrated on producing sporting long guns for entry-level shooters, mainly shotguns. Most of these were bolt-action or pump-action designs. In August 1961, Mossberg introduced the 500 Series pump-action shotgun, which eventually became one of the most-produced sporting firearms in the world, with over ten million shotguns sold. Designed by Carl Benson, Mossberg's lead design engineer, the 500 was initially intended for use by the entry-level hunter and shooter but has since become popular for home defense use as well. Using a forged aluminum receiver and steel bolt that locks into a steel extension of the barrel to save weight, Benson designed the gun with a minimum of parts that could be produced quickly with a minimum of machining required and which could be installed without hand-fitting. The U.S. military and law enforcement agencies have adopted variants of the basic Mossberg 500 shotgun.

Mossberg offers bolt-action, lever-action, and auto-loading rifles, as well as pump-action, auto-loading, and over/under shotguns. Manufacturing is done both in Turkey and in the US from parts made in both America and Mexico.

In January 2019, the company introduced the MC1sc, a subcompact semi-automatic pistol chambered in 9×19mm Parabellum, Mossberg's first handgun offering since the Brownie was introduced 100 years prior.

== Products ==
=== Rifles ===
- Mossberg 100ATR
- Mossberg 464
- Mossberg 702 Plinkster
- Mossberg 715T
- Mossberg Modern Rifle (MMR)
- Mossberg 802 Plinkster
- Mossberg Blaze
- Mossberg Patriot
- Mossberg MVP

=== Shotguns ===
- Mossberg 183
- Mossberg 185
- Mossberg 190
- Mossberg 500
- Mossberg 590
- Mossberg 590M
- Mossberg 590S
- Mossberg 590A1
- Mossberg 835
- Mossberg 930
- Mossberg 940 JM Pro
- Mossberg 9200 series
- Mossberg Maverick
- New Haven 600

=== Pistols ===
- Mossberg Brownie
- Mossberg MC1sc
- Mossberg MC2c
- Mossberg MC2sc
