= Mossberg 500 =

Series of pump-action shotguns

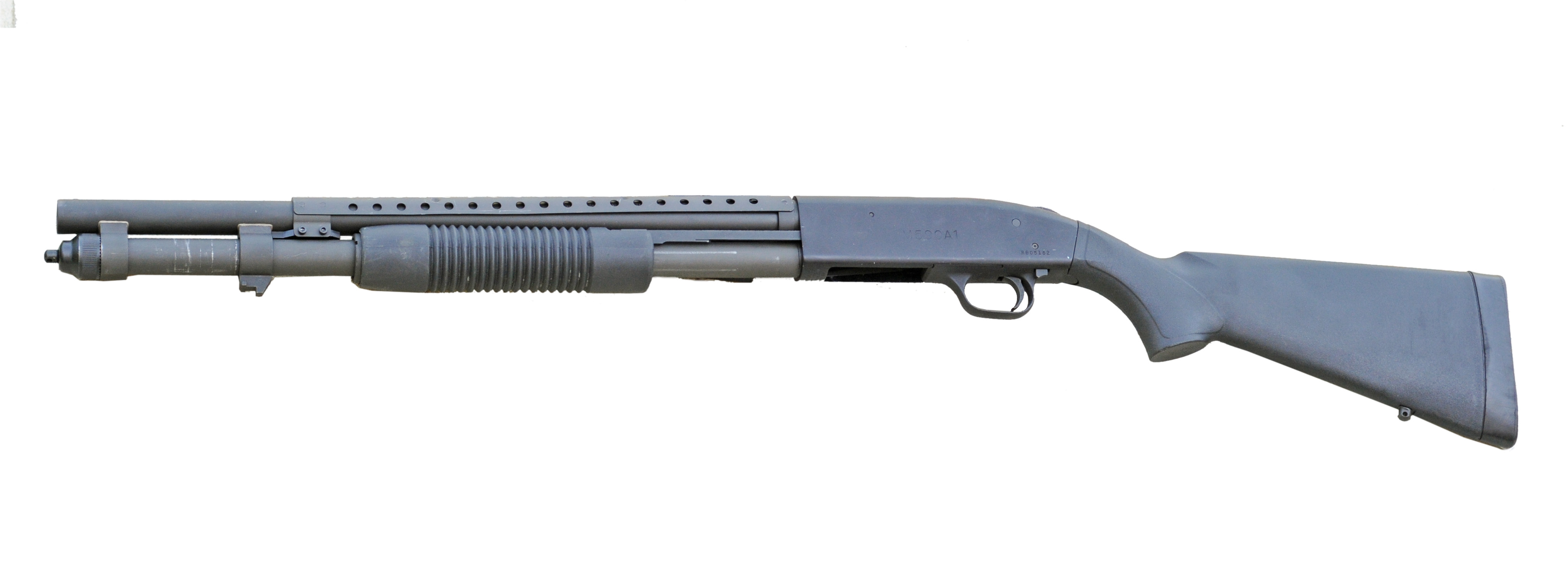
- Mossberg 590A1 in 12 gauge, with a barrel shroud and bayonet lug
- Type: Pump-action shotgun
- Place of origin: United States

Service history
- In service: 1961–present
- Used by: See Users
- Wars: Lebanese Civil War; Gulf War; War in Afghanistan (2001–2021); Iraq War; Militias-Comando Vermelho conflict; 2022 Kazakh unrest; Russian invasion of Ukraine

Production history
- Designer: Carl Benson
- Designed: 1961
- Manufacturer: O. F. Mossberg & Sons
- Produced: 1961–present
- No. built: 11,000,000

Specifications
- Mass: 7.0–7.75 lb (3.18–3.52 kg)
- Length: 36.12–41.0 in (91.7–104.1 cm)
- Barrel length: 18.5–20.0 in (47–51 cm)
- Caliber: 12 gauge, 20 gauge, and .410 bore
- Action: Pump action
- Feed system: 5+1 to 8+1 rounds; internal tube magazine
- Sights: Bead or ghost ring iron sights

The Mossberg 500 is a series of pump-action shotguns manufactured by O.F. Mossberg & Sons. The 500 series comprises widely varying models of hammerless repeaters, all of which share the same basic receiver and action, but differ in bore size, barrel length, choke options, magazine capacity, stock and forearm materials. Model numbers included in the 500 series are the 500, 505, 510, 535, and 590. The Revelation 310 and the New Haven 600 were also variations of the 500 series produced by Mossberg under different names. By 2021, about 11 million M500s had been produced, making it the most-produced shotgun of all time.

== History ==
Designed in 1961 by Carl Benson, the Mossberg 500 was created mainly for use by hunters, but quickly was in use by law enforcement because of its reliability and low cost. In the 1970s, the M500 was submitted for military use, but failed to meet the MIL-SPEC 3443E protocol, which involves firing 3,000 rounds of shells with no more than two malfunctions. During the testing, some M500s were created to better match the MIL-SPEC, which came at an increase in cost. M500s began to be purchased by the US military in limited numbers, with the first order consisting of approximately 5,900 shotguns for the Navy and Coast Guard.

To maintain its low cost, Mossberg continued to produce the M500 for civilian and police markets, and in 1987, designed the M590 specifically for military use. In response to a Navy request, the M590 was modified, with a thickened barrel, extended magazine, barrel shroud, and bayonet lug. The new model, designated the M590A1, became the standard shotgun in the United States military.

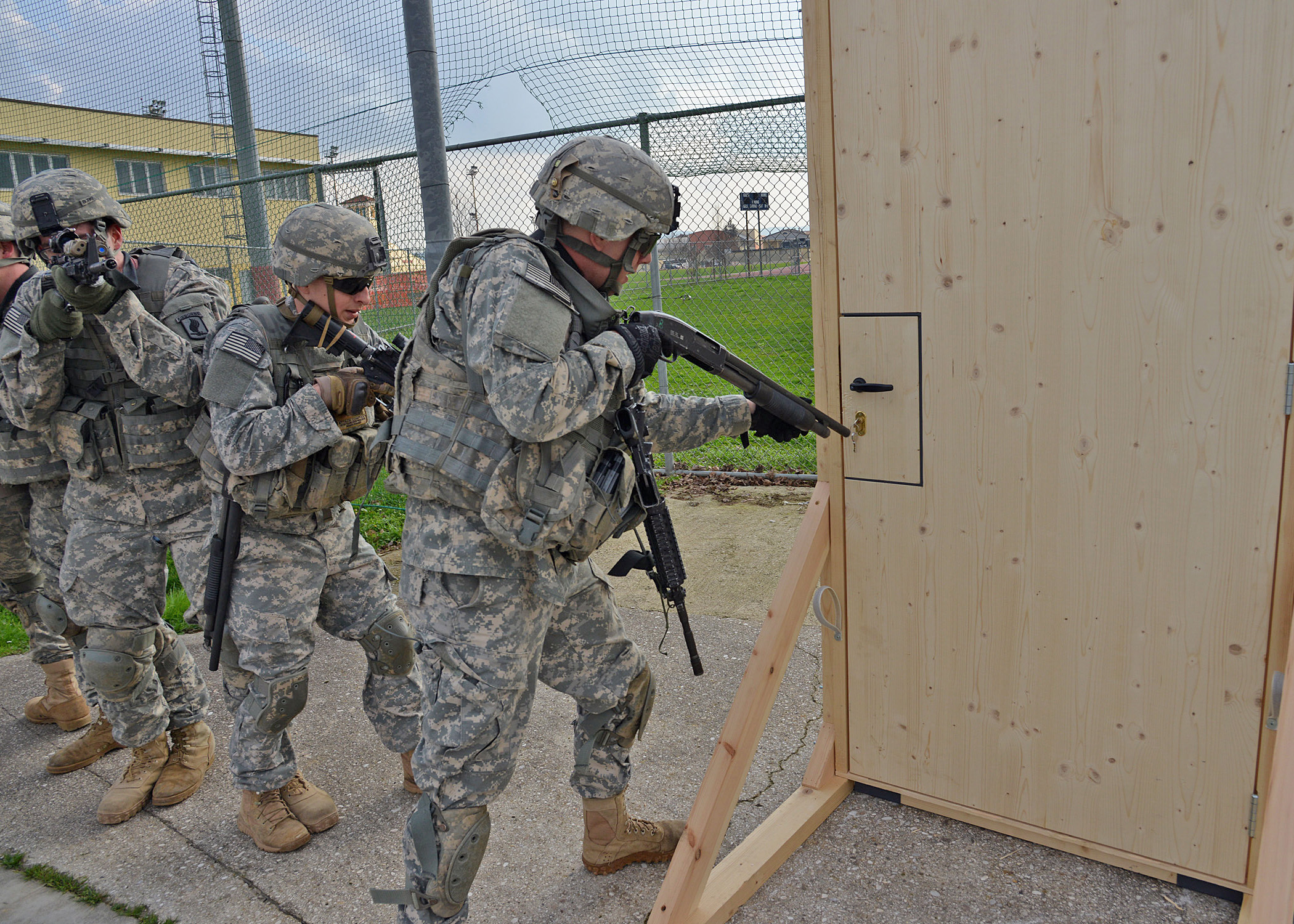
A paratrooper from the 503rd Infantry Regiment uses an M500 to open a door during a training exercise in Italy, 2014.

Replacement for the M500 came as early as 1999, when the Marine Corps adopted the semi-automatic M1014 Combat Shotgun, which became standard issue by 2001. In 1997, the Army began to develop the M26 Modular Accessory Shotgun System, an underbarrel shotgun designed for usage on the M4 carbine, which could also be used as a standalone weapon. The MASS first entered service in 2010. Despite the competing shotgun designs, including other pump action models such as the Remington Model 870 and Winchester Model 1200, Mossberg shotguns continued to see usage in various American military branches until the end of the 2010s.

M500 and M590 shotguns were first used during the 1991 Gulf War, wherein they were used to defend US supply depots. In the wars in Iraq and Afghanistan, M500 shotguns were primarily used for breaking locks and hinges during door breaches. In 2009, U.S. Army Special Forces Groups procured Military Enhancement Kits to provide a standardized shotgun configuration based on the Mossberg 500. The kits included a collapsible stock, "shotgun retention system", 1913 receiver rail, fore end rail system and breaching barrels. A total of 1301 shotguns were converted with the first unit being equipped in July 2009. The majority of the kits convert the standard issue shotgun to a 14" compact model with a 16" accessory breaching barrel, H92239-09-P-0113.

Mossberg later produced a compact pistol grip variant of M590, called "Cruiser".

== Model 500 options ==
The name "Model 500" covers an entire family of pump shotguns designed to chamber 3-inch (76 mm) "magnum" shells. The standard model holds six 2.75-inch (70 mm) or five 3-inch (76 mm) shells in the magazine and one in the chamber. The Model 500 is available in 12 gauge, 20 gauge, and .410 bore, with the 12 gauge being the most popular and having the most optional features available. A 16 gauge model was introduced in 1963 and later discontinued.

=== Finishes ===
The standard finish for the Model 500 is an anodized aluminum alloy receiver and a polished and blued barrel. Some models come with a matte black matte-anodized receiver, and a matte blued barrel. Some 500 models are anodized to look parkerized, with parkerized barrels. This is also true of the 590 series since an aluminum receiver cannot be parkerized.

Mossberg also offers camouflage painted models, in a number of different patterns. Stocks are either wood or composite, with the composite stocks being matte black or camouflage to match the rest of the gun. A special model called the Mariner is available with the Marinecote finish, an electroless-nickel finish that is highly corrosion resistant. Mariner models use the black composite stocks.

=== Model 500 vs. Model 590 vs. Model 590A1 ===
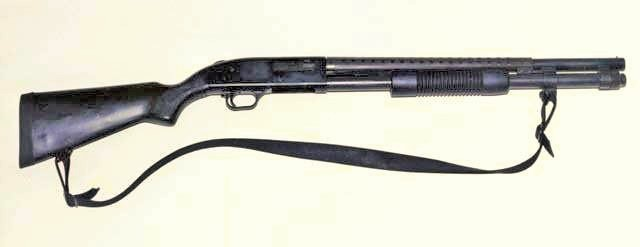
Mossberg 590 with 20-inch (510 mm) barrel

The primary difference between the Model 500 and Model 590 is in magazine tube design. The Model 500 magazines are closed at the muzzle end, and the barrel is held in place by bolting into a threaded hole at the end of the magazine tube. Model 590 magazines are designed to be opened at the muzzle end, and the barrels fit around the magazine tube and are held on by a capnut at the end. The Model 500 magazine facilitates easy barrel changes, as the barrel bolt serves no function other than holding the barrel in place. The Model 590 magazine facilitates easy cleaning and parts replacement, as removing the nut allows removal of the magazine spring and follower.

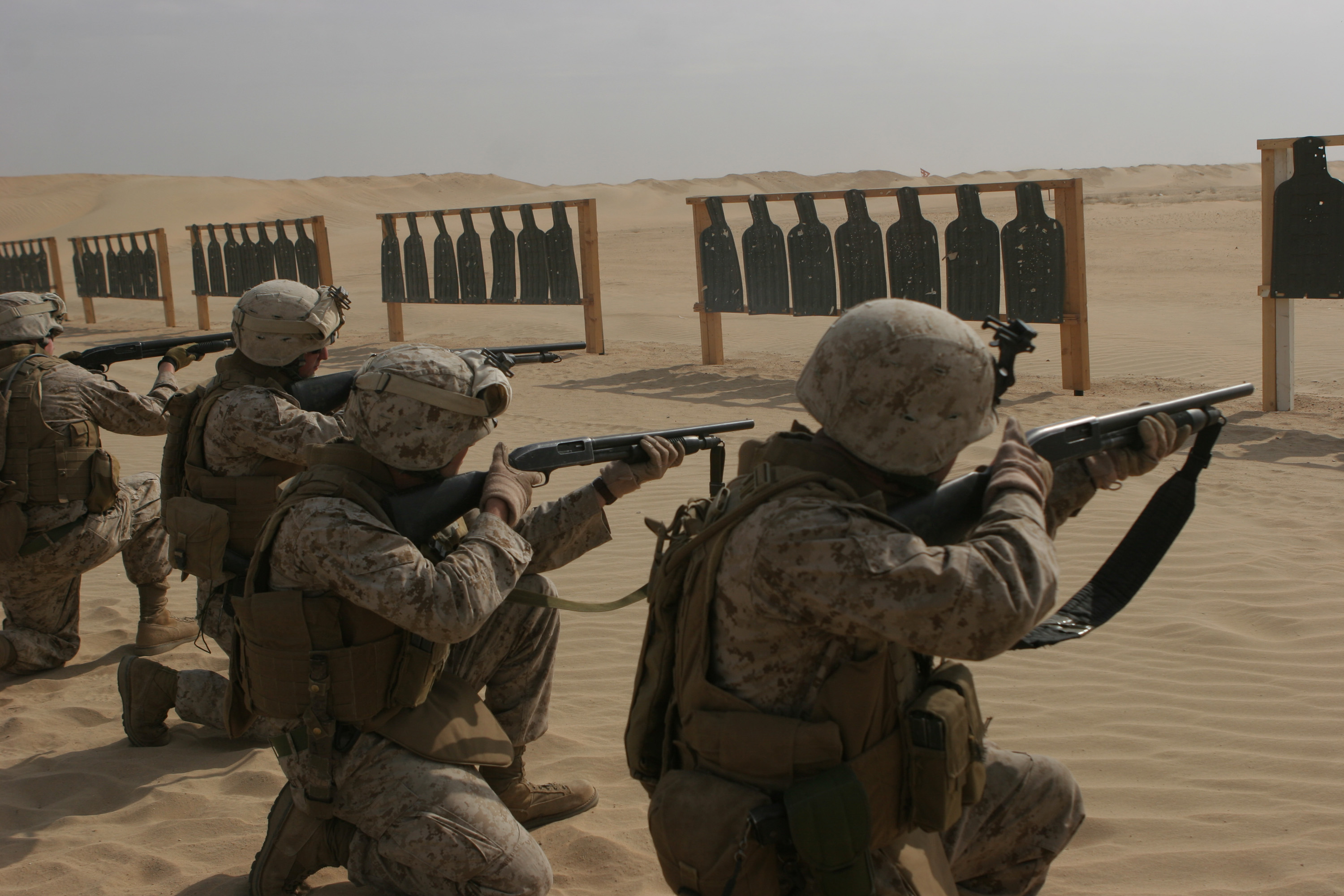
United States Marines train with M500 shotguns

Both the Model 500 and Model 590 have polymer trigger guards and safeties, and standard barrels. The Model 590A1 has an aluminum trigger guard and safety, a heavier barrel, and a bayonet lug (although some versions of the 590 also have bayonet lugs), intended for military use under extreme conditions and rough handling; the metal trigger guard was added in response to the 3443G materials requirements, and the heavy barrel was added at the request of the Navy to prevent barrel deformation if the shotgun caught in the closing of heavy steel ship doors. Some 590A1s have a sling swivel on the back of the bayonet lug, some do not. The 590A1 usually has a swivel mount on the stock even when there is no corresponding mount on the forward end of the weapon. The 590A1 is generally sold through military and law enforcement channels, though in most jurisdictions the 18.5-inch (47 cm) and 20-inch (51 cm) barreled models are available and may be legally purchased by any non-prohibited persons. 590A1s with 14" barrels are Title II firearms, and may be purchased only by non-prohibited persons in NFA-legal states, after completing BATF transfer forms.

The riot gun versions of the pistol grip Model 500 (Persuader, Cruiser, Road Blocker, and Mariner) are available with an 18.5-inch (47 cm) and 20-inch (51 cm) barrel depending on magazine capacity. The 590 is only available with a 20-inch (510 mm) barrel and flush-fit magazine tube. The 590A1 is available with a 14-inch (36 cm), 18.5-inch, or 20-inch (510 mm) barrel. One model sold as Model 590-SP (catalog item 51663) is technically a 590A1, as it uses the heavy barrel and military trigger group, but unlike models designated 590A1 it is sold on the civilian market.

Unlike Model 500 and 590 shotguns (with the exception of ghost-ring sight 590 models), Model 590A1 shotguns cannot be easily fitted with the common factory 500 heat shield, due to the heavier barrel. A heat shield and bayonet lug are required for military 3443G Type I riot shotguns, and some 590A1s are so equipped. The 590A1 heat shield, p/n 16335P, is available for purchase from Mossberg for about the same price as the 500 heat shield.

=== Bantam and Super Bantam models ===
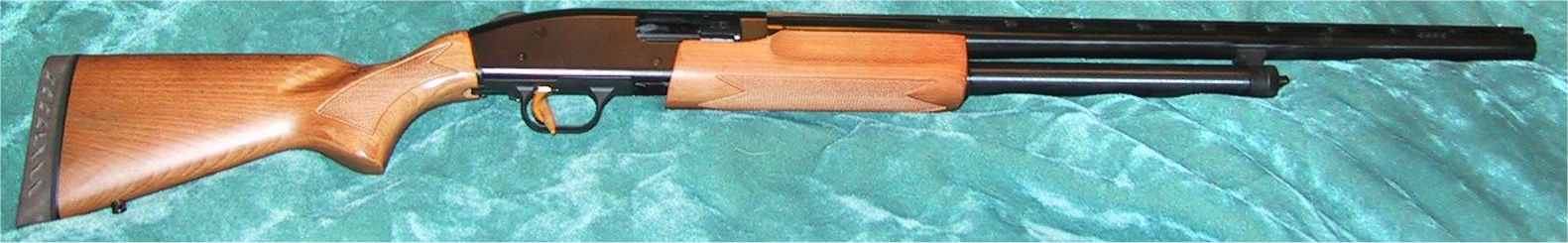
Mossberg 500 Bantam, with 24-inch (610 mm) barrel. Note shorter stock and forend than standard model at top.

The standard Model 500 uses a 14-inch (36 cm) length of pull (LOP) for the stock, which is suitable for adult shooters of average or greater size. The Bantam models use a 13-inch (33 cm) LOP stock and a forend that sits further back than the standard model. The Super Bantam stock includes two recoil pads and a stock spacer.

By using the short pad, the LOP can be reduced to 12 inches (30 cm); with the spacer and longer pad, the LOP is 13 inches (330 mm). A number of different models are offered with Bantam and Super Bantam stocks, or they can be ordered as accessories and fitted to any Model 500.

=== Model 505 ===
The new Model 505 Youth shotgun, introduced in 2005, is similar to the Bantam but scaled down further. The 505 has a 12-inch (30 cm) LOP buttstock (compared to a standard model's 14 inches or 36 centimetres, or a Bantam's 13 inches or 33 centimetres), a 20-inch (51 cm) barrel, and a four-shot magazine tube. The 505 is available in 20 gauge and .410 bore. Parts are not interchangeable with other model 500 variants.

=== Model 535 ===
The Model 535, new for 2005, is similar to the Model 500, but with a lengthened receiver that can fire 3.5-inch (89 mm) shells, in addition to 2.75-inch (70 mm) and 3-inch (76 mm) shells. The 535 is a less expensive alternative to the Mossberg 835 Ulti-Mag, but the 535 lacks the 835's overbored barrel. The non-overbored barrel of the 535 does, however, allow the use of slugs, which cannot be used in the overbored barrel of the 835.

Model 535 barrels are not interchangeable with Model 500 or Model 835 barrels, but 535 barrels are available in smoothbore and rifled in a variety of vent ribbed, barrel lengths and different sights. The 535 is also available in a tactical model with ghost ring sights and a collapsible pistol grip buttstock. Although Model 500 barrels can be used with Model 535 receivers, magazine tubes from the Model 500 must also be used because of the magazine tube length difference.

=== Model 590M ===
In 2018, Mossberg created the Model 590M, a magazine-fed variant of the M590 model utilizing detachable 5, 10 or 20 round magazines for civilian use. It currently is offered in both Shockwave and Standard models.

=== Magazine capacity ===
The Model 500 comes in a variety of different receiver configurations, whose main difference is the magazine configuration. The basic Model 500 comes with a magazine tube capable of holding five 2.75-inch (70 mm) shells, which is called a six-shot model (a full magazine plus a round in the chamber). The 500 is also available with an extended magazine tube that holds seven rounds, making an eight-shot model. The 590A1 is available with five- and eight-shot magazines, sold as six- and nine-shot models respectively. The Model 590A1 also allows the use of magazine extensions in place of the magazine cap to further increase the capacity of ammunition.

The variants with the extended magazine tubes use different barrels, as the barrel is held in place by attaching at the end of the magazine tube. The shortest barrel length available for the eight- and nine-shot models is 20 inches (51 cm), which fits flush with the long magazine tube. A ribbed 28-inch (71 cm) modified choke field barrel was also manufactured for the 8-shot model 500. The shortest barrel for Title I six-shot models is 18.0 inches (46 cm), while military and law enforcement personnel (as well private persons in NFA states) can also get a 14-inch (36 cm) barrel (the 590 Compact), which uses a special 5-shot magazine.

== Model 500 variants ==
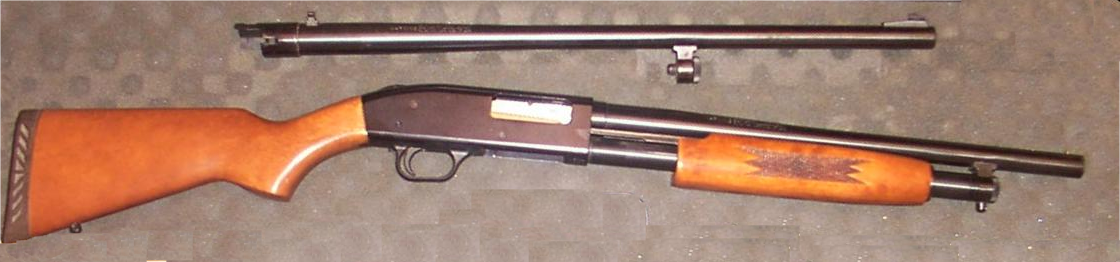
Mossberg 500 with 18.5-inch (470 mm) cylinder bore barrel installed, and a 24-inch (610 mm) cylinder bore barrel with rifle sights. (Cylinder bore means lacking any choke.)

The Model 500 is available in many variants, for a wide variety of applications. The ease of changing barrels on the Model 500 means that a single shotgun may be equipped by the owner with a number of barrels, each for a different purpose. As sold, the Model 500 is generally classed into two broad categories: field models and special purpose models.

=== Field models ===
Field models are the basic sporting models. They are available with a variety of barrel lengths and finishes, and may be set up for waterfowl hunting, upland game hunting, turkey hunting, or shooting slugs. Most smoothbore models come with interchangeable choke tubes and vent rib barrels, while the slug models come with rifle sights or scope bases, and may have smooth cylinder bore or rifled barrels.

=== Special purpose models ===
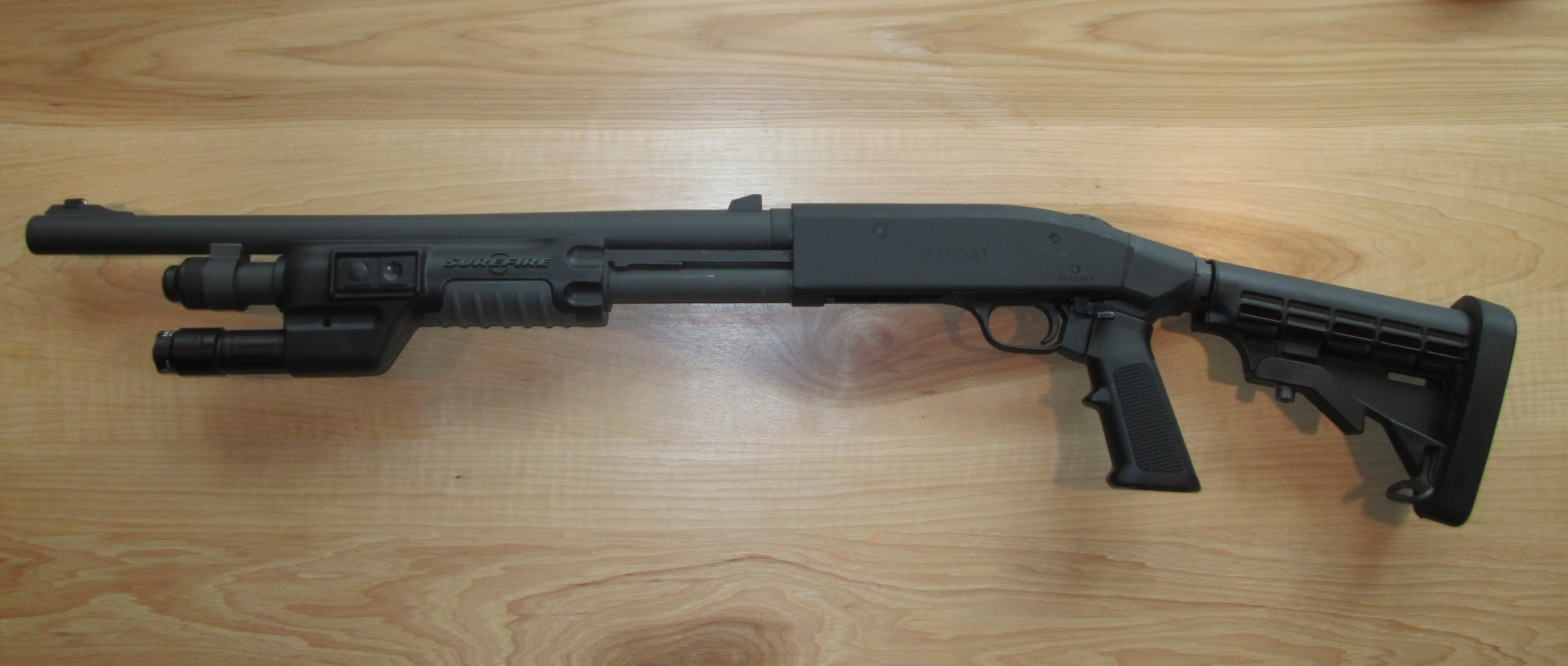
Mossberg 590A1 Tactical, 12 Ga, 6-shot, 18.5" barrel, tactical light, and collapsible stock

Special purpose models are intended for self defense, police, or military use. The Model 590 and the eight-shot Model 500s are only sold as special purpose models. Special purpose models have short barrels, either 18.5 inches (47 cm) for the six-shot models, or 20 inches (51 cm) for the eight- and nine-shot models, but the barrels are fully interchangeable with all models of the same magazine tube length and in the 500 family. Most models come with special designations like SPX, Tactical, Mariner, etc.

Special purpose models may be equipped with a variety of specialty parts which may include adjustable stock, "Speedfeed" stock that holds four additional rounds of ammunition, pistol grip, ghost ring and fiber optic sights, Picatinny rail, forearm band, heatshield, ported barrel, muzzle brake, and even a bayonet lug. All special purpose models come only in black trim with either blued, non-glare matte blue, or parkerized finishes and now come with drilled and tapped receivers for scope and optics mounting.

"Special Purpose" models are not the same as "Law Enforcement" models; the latter have heavier duty barrels, safeties, trigger guards, and will stand up to harder use.

In 2018, Mossberg released the 590M, a pump-action shotgun fed by a double-stack magazine. It is available in three models; one is a derivative of the Shockwave, the other two are variants of the base 590, one having ghost ring sights and a heat shield, the other without. The magazines are available in 5, 10, 15, and 20-round capacities.

=== Law enforcement models ===
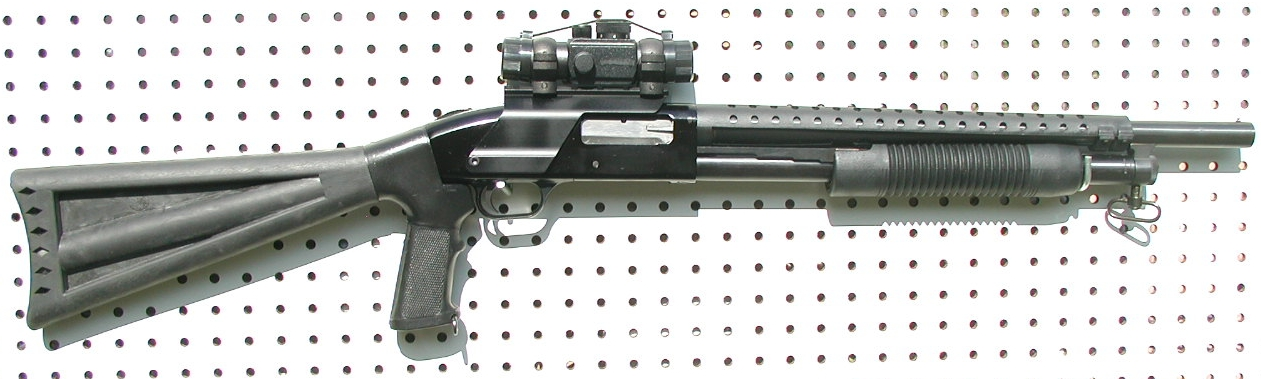
Model 500 Law enforcement combo with red-dot sight

Mossberg shotguns currently designated "law enforcement models" are 590A1s. 590A1s differ from other 500/590 shotguns, in that they have heavy barrels, metal trigger guards, and metal safeties. 590A1s are available in 14-inch (36 cm), 18.5-inch (47 cm), and 20-inch (51 cm) barrels. The 590A1 is also used by the U.S. and allied armed forces, having been designed to meet the stricter standards outlined by the U.S. Army.

Model 500s were also previously sold as law enforcement combos in 12 gauge with both 18.5-inch (47 cm) and 28-inch (71 cm) barrels, birch buttstock, pistol grip and sling.

=== Home security model ===
The model 500 HS410, or "Home Security" model, is available in .410 gauge only, and is specifically designed for defensive use. It comes with a youth-sized stock, a vertical foregrip, and a special muzzle brake and spreader choke (to help produce wider patterns when using buckshot) on an 18.5-inch (47 cm) bead sight barrel. Some versions have a laser sight mounted in the foregrip. The .410 gauge round, while regarded as the least powerful common shotgun chambering, remains a powerful shotgun shell. A 90-grain slug generates energy close to (and in some manufacturer claims, exceeding) a .357 Magnum when fired from a full length barrel. The HS410 is targeted at the novice user who desires a simple, easy to use, and effective defensive weapon. It is packaged with an introductory video covering use and safety.

== Mossberg Shockwave ==
The Mossberg Shockwave is a pump action firearm based on the 590 series of shotguns. It is distinguished from the rest of the 590 series by its 14 in (36 cm) barrel and "birds-head" style pistol grip instead of a shoulder stock. The Mossberg Shockwave was the best-selling pump action shotgun in the United States in 2020.

=== Design ===
The action of the Shockwave is taken from Mossberg's 590 series of shotguns. It features the same sliding tang safety on the top rear of the receiver, twin action bars, and dual extractors seen on other models. The name is inherited from the manufacturer of the grip, Shockwave Technologies. Mossberg claims the grip reduces recoil. The Shockwave weighs 5.25 pounds (2.38 kg) empty, holds five rounds in the magazine tube, and has a single brass bead front sight with no rear sight. Production began in 2017 with a 12 gauge model, adding 20 gauge and .410 bore models later.

=== Legality ===
In the United States, the Shockwave does not fit the definition of a shotgun as defined by the ATF, which says that shotguns have barrels over 18 inches (46 cm) in length and are made to be fired from the shoulder. It avoids restriction as a short barrel shotgun under Title II of federal firearm laws by remaining over 26 inches (66 cm) in length and not being made to have a shoulder stock. The ATF refers to the Shockwave as a non-NFA firearm. While legal without a tax stamp at a federal level, regulations also vary by state, thereby prohibiting purchase in some states.

In Canada, the Shockwave is generally classified as a non-restricted firearm, as pump-action and other manually operated firearms with a fixed stock do not have a minimum factory barrel length requirement. The bird's head grip meant the Shockwave is deemed as a regular long gun similar to a Mare's Leg, and not a "handgun".

== Accessories and combinations ==
The Mossberg 500 has always been marketed as a multi-purpose firearm. Mossberg sells a wide variety of accessory stocks and barrels, allowing many configurations to be made (including, in the past, a bullpup configured model 500). Mossberg is also the only company to ever offer a double-action-only model. The model 590DA offers a longer, heavier trigger pull, to reduce the chance of an accidental discharge by the operator, and was targeted at the police market.

With the appropriate parts, the same Model 500 can be a field gun, a slug gun, defensive weapon for civilian, police, or military use, trap and skeet gun, or .50 caliber (12.7mm) rifled muzzleloader.

Mossberg has also sold "combination" sets, with a single receiver and more than one barrel. Common examples included a 28-inch (71 cm) field barrel packaged with an 18.5-inch (47 cm) cylinder bore barrel for defensive use, or a field barrel and a slug barrel, or a slug barrel and a .50 caliber muzzleloading rifle barrel.

A unique item offered by Mossberg for the Model 500 is a line launcher kit. It uses special blank cartridge to propel a shaft with an optional floating head and a light rope attached to it; a canister hung below the barrel to hold the line spool. A test of the Mossberg 500 with line launcher by the BoatUS Foundation showed an average range of over 330 feet (100 m) with the floating head. Distances of 700 feet (210 m) are claimed for the non-floating long distance head.

All Mossberg models including the 835, 535, 500, 505 and 590 (except for Special-Purpose and Law Enforcement models) are shipped with a wooden dowel with two rubber O-rings, also called a duck plug, located in the tube magazine. This is to comply with U.S. migratory bird laws. This dowel reduces and regulates the number of shells that can be loaded in the magazine to 2. This can be removed by taking off the barrel, pointing the shotgun downward, and shaking it back and forth lightly until the dowel shows out of the end of the magazine tube. It must then be pulled out, as the O-rings prevent it from just falling out. Except for the Maverick 88, all current production Mossberg models have a pre-drilled receiver for installation of an upper Picatinny rail for mounting various optics such as red dot sights. Some models can be bought with the rail and accessories already installed.

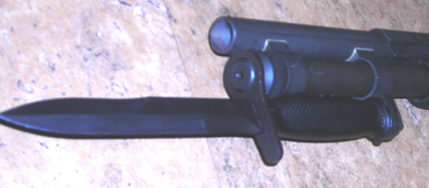
M7 bayonet mounted on a Mossberg 590A1

Some Mossberg models, like the 590, have a bayonet lug.

== Maverick Arms subsidiary ==
Mossberg also markets a less expensive shotgun under the Maverick Arms name, the Mossberg Maverick 88, in blued finish, with synthetic stocks, and in appearance, it is virtually identical to the 500 model. Maverick and Mossberg shotguns share many interchangeable parts, but Maverick shotguns differ in some ways, such as lacking sling swivel studs and having cross-bolt safeties instead of tang safeties, which makes the trigger group non-interchangeable with the Model 500 shotgun. The one-piece forearm can be replaced with OEM or aftermarket parts with the addition of an action slide tube, as the factory forearm has the action bars pinned into place. The Maverick series also does not come drilled and tapped for rail mounts like the 500 models. There are two basic models of the 88, the 88 field and the 88 security, with a cartridge capacity of six or eight shots, and their magazines unscrew from the receiver and can be replaced with any of the tubular Mossberg 500/590 magazines.

== Model numbers ==
- 500A = 12 gauge
- 500AB = 12 gauge, Dual Action Bar
- 500B = 16 gauge (has been discontinued)
- 500C = 20 gauge and 12 gauge
- 500D = 28 gauge (never went into production)
- 500E = .410 bore

== Users ==
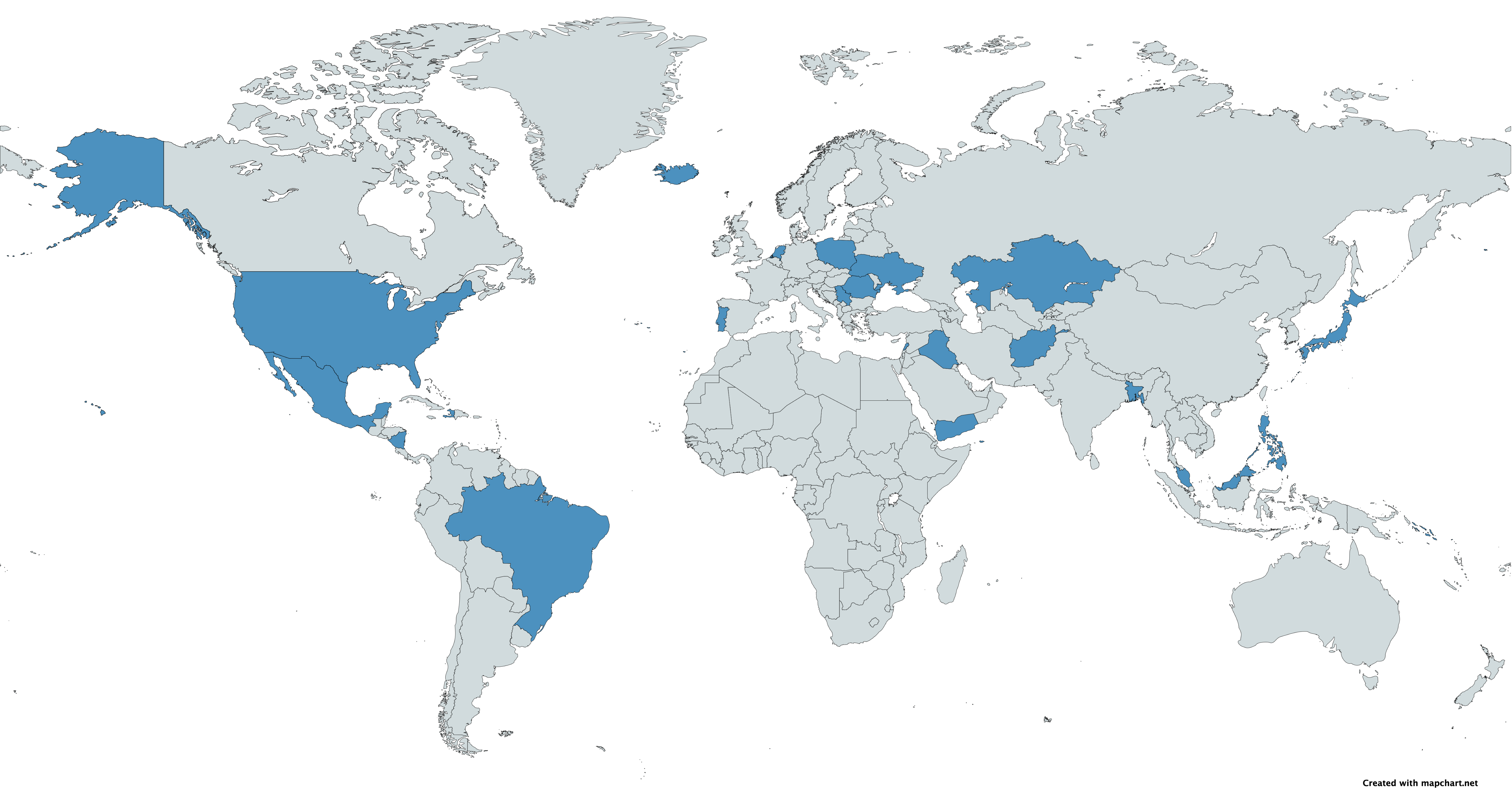
A map with Mossberg 500 users in blue

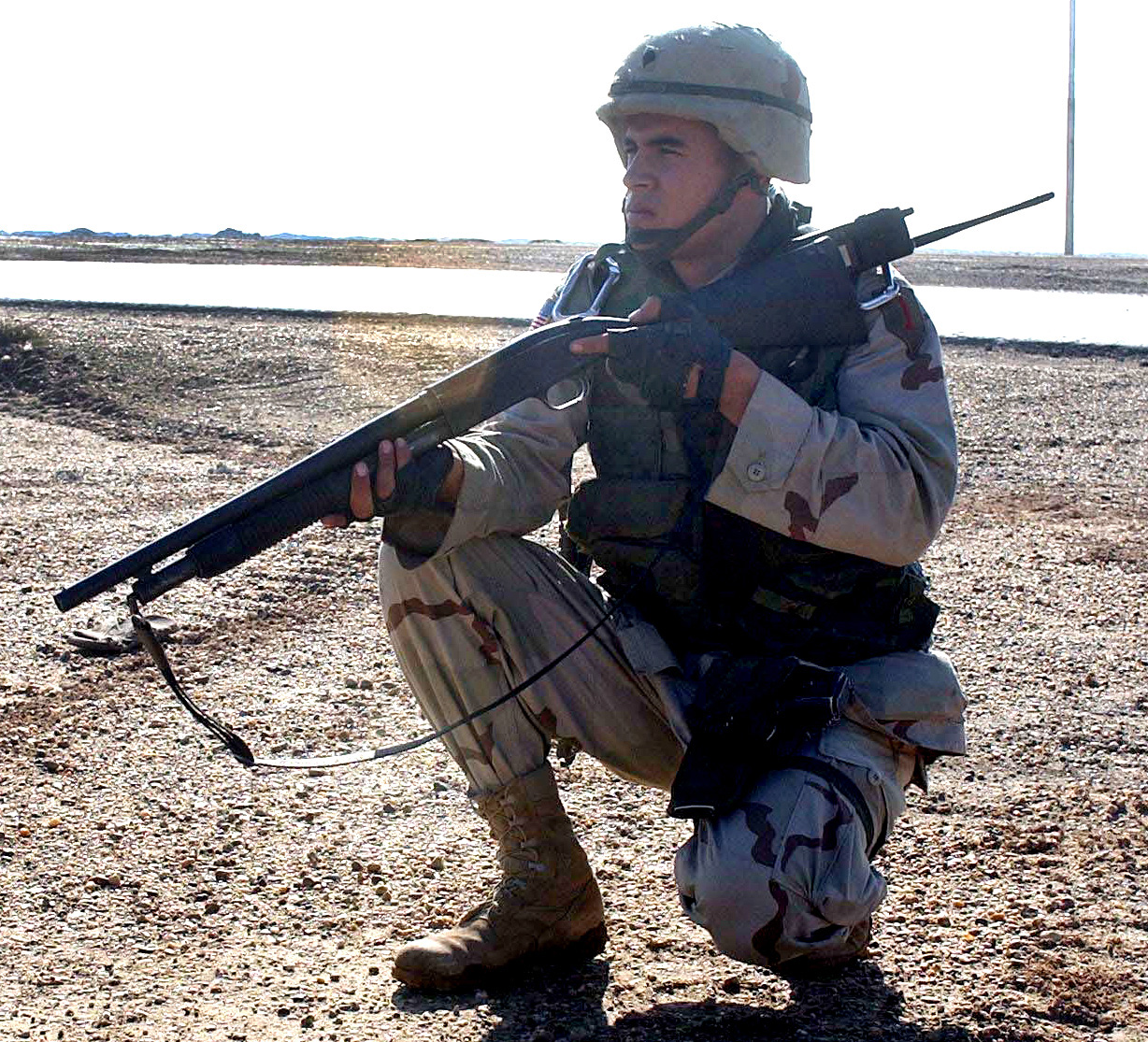
A U.S. soldier in Ar Ramadi, Iraq in 2004 armed with a Mossberg 500.

Mossberg produced two U.S. military versions of the model 500, the 500 MILS and the 500M MILS, the difference being the location of the upper sling swivel. The model numbers contain a U.S. prefix to the serial number. These particular models (500 MILS & 500M MILS) contain all metal parts, are parkerized with a 20-inch barrel. The magazine capacity is 6+1.

- Papua New Guinea used by Royal Papua New Guinea Constublary Police Force, 590A1 and 500 in use with Task Force Unit and Special Service Division Unit within the RPCPF
- Afghanistan
- Argentina
- Bangladesh
- Brazil: Used by naval infantry 590 in use with Marine Special Operations Battalion and Army Police. 500 Cruiser issued to BFEsp
- Chile
- Haiti
- Iceland: National Police of Iceland.
- Iraq
- Japan: Used by Japan Self-Defense Forces.
- Kazakhstan
- Lebanon
- Malaysia: Malaysian Special Operations Force and RELA Corps.
- Mexico
- Netherlands: 590DA1 is used by the Korps Commandotroepen, Armoured infantry and the Airmobile Brigade of the Royal Netherlands Army.
- Nicaragua
- Philippines
- Poland: 50,440 in use by Military Gendarmerie and 590 in use by Policja since 1994 and probably in use by Polish Troops in Afghanistan.
- Portugal: Used by Portuguese Marine Corps.
- Romania
- Saudi Arabia 12 Gauge Mossberg 500
- Serbia: Mossberg M-590 is used by Special Anti-Terrorist Unit.
- Solomon Islands: Used by Royal Solomon Islands Police Force.
- Spain 12 Gauge Mossberg 500. In service with the Guardia Civil and the Cuerpo Superior security forces.
- United States: Used by the Army, Navy, and Marines.
- Ukraine: Was donated to the Ukrainian Army by the United States government in the 2022 Russian invasion of Ukraine.
- Yemen

=== Non-state users ===
- Lebanese Forces

== See also ==
- Combat shotgun
- List of shotguns
- List of shotguns of the U.S. Armed Forces
