= Mossberg 185 =

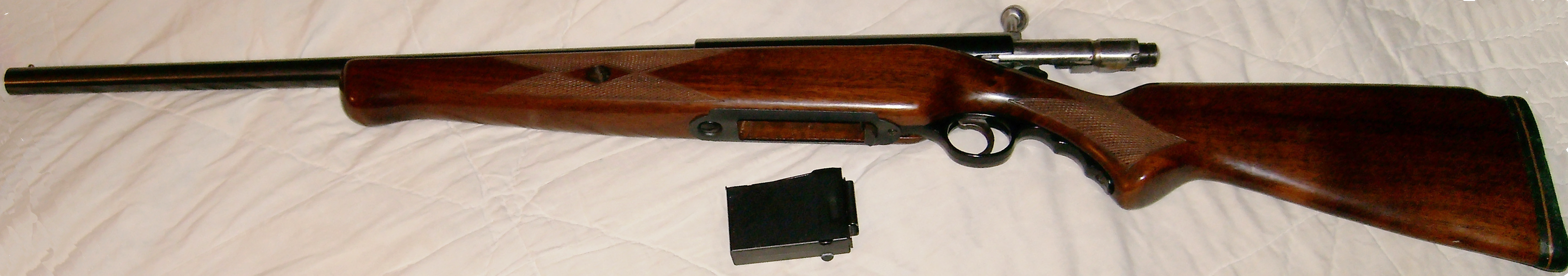
- Type: Shotgun
- Place of origin: United States

Production history
- Produced: 1947 – 1964

Specifications
- Mass: 6.25 lb (2.83 kg)
- Barrel length: 26 in (660.4 mm)
- Cartridge: 20 gauge, 2¾"
- Action: bolt action
- Rate of fire: round per minute
- Muzzle velocity: fps
- Effective firing range: 100 Yards for slugs
- Maximum firing range: 45 yards for birdshot
- Feed system: Box magazine, 2 rounds
- Sights: Gold Bead

The Mossberg 185 is a 20-gauge bolt-action shotgun, produced between 1948 and 1964 by O.F. Mossberg & Sons in New Haven, Connecticut.

== Variants ==
=== Commonalities ===
All Model 185 variants have the following features in common:

- Bolt action. Operates in the same fashion as bolt-action rifles. Mossberg's original bolt-action shotgun designs derived much from Mauser bolt-action rifles which had been custom converted into smooth-bore shotguns.

- Chambered in 20 gauge x 2.75"/70mm. They will not accept 3"/76mm shells. The original D variants may also have accepted 2.5" shells, but those are no longer manufactured.

- Removable box-type magazine holds two shells, giving a maximum capacity of 2+1 (=3) shells. Magazine is inserted into bottom of receiver just ahead of trigger guard.

- Manual trigger-block safety switch is mounted at top-rear of receiver.

- One-piece stock of American Walnut with Monte Carlo-style comb.

- Trigger guard of black plastic which has molded-in finger ridges along pistol grip of stock.

- Takedown design: by removing the magazine and one screw, the receiver and barrel assembly can be separated from the stock and trigger guard assembly to enable easier cleaning, storage, and transportation.

- Smooth barrel without sighting rib. Uses brass bead front sight along with what could be described as a 0.25"-long "rib" mounted near the breech for use as a rear sight.

- Model 185 shotguns were manufactured from 1947 to 1964, so most - if not all - do not have serial numbers as those were not mandated until 1968.

=== D models ===
All 185D variants were distributed with three choke tubes (IC, M, and F sizes) which, unlike more modern shotgun choke tubes, mounted by screwing to the outside of the barrel. The choke tubes were knurled on the outside, but the shotgun was also shipped with a wrench to make it easier to remove the choke tubes.

Specs: 3-Shot, Takedown, 20 gauge only (2 1/2 & 2 3/4-inch), 2 shell detachable magazine. Weight 6 1/4 lbs, barrel, 25" with three interchangeable choke tubes, Modified, Full & Improved Cylinder. Plain one piece Monte Carlo pistol grip stock.

Model 185D: The original model 185, produced from 1947 to 1950.

Model 185D-A: Made in 1950 only.

Model 185D-B: Firing pin design change. Made from 1950 to 1955.

Model 185D-C: Redesign of magazine bottom plate. Made from 1955 to 1958.

=== K models ===
All 185K variants were equipped with a C-LECT adjustable choke and a ported barrel. The C-LECT choke operated much like the chuck on a drill: turning the outer tube one direction threaded it further onto the barrel, which allowed the multi-petaled inner tube to open; turning the outer tube in the opposite direction forced the petals of the inner tube closer. In this manner, the C-LECT choke could be continually varied from Cylinder to Full choke.

Specs: 3-Shot, Takedown, 20 gauge only (2 3/4-inch), 2 shell detachable magazine. Weight 6 1/4 lbs, barrel, 26" with variable C-Lect-Choke with ventilated barrel. Genuine American Walnut Monte Carlo one piece pistol grip stock with recoil pad.

Model 185K: Made in 1950 only.

Model 185K-A: Made from 1950 to 1955.

Model 185K-B: Made from 1955 to 1963.

Model 185K-C: Changes to trigger and safety lever. Made from 1963 to 1964.

Model 185K-E: Change to butt plate. Made in 1964 only.
