= Mossberg 464 =

2008 American firearm

Mossberg 464 Lever Action Rifle
- Type: Lever Action Rifle
- Place of origin: United States

Production history
- Manufacturer: Mossberg Firearms Company
- Produced: 2008–present
- Variants: See text

Mossberg model 464 is a lever action repeating rifle manufactured since 2008 by the Mossberg firearms company. It comes in two calibers: .30-30 Winchester and .22 Long Rifle

== Specifications ==
Model 464: .30-30 Winchester

- Total length: 38.5 inches
- Weight: 6.7 lbs
- Barrel length: 20 inches
- Twist: 1 turn in 10"
- Caliber: .30-30 Winchester
- Magazine: tubular, seven round capacity (one in the chamber and six in the magazine)
- Finish: Blued Steel and Wood

Model 464: .22 Long Rifle

- Total length: 38.75 Inches
- Weight: 5.6 lbs
- Barrel length: 18 inches
- Twist: 1 turn in 16"
- Caliber: .22 Long Rifle
- Magazine: tubular, 13 round capacity (one in the chamber and twelve in the magazine)
- Finish: Blued Steel and Wood
