= Stevens Arms =

American firearms manufacturer

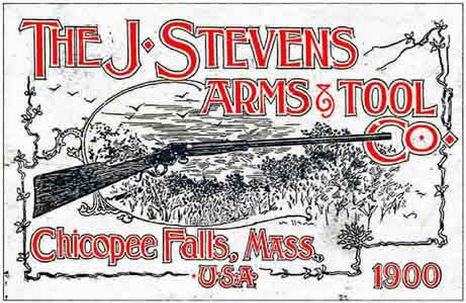
- Industry: Firearms manufacturer
- Predecessor: J. Stevens & Co. (1864–1886); J. Stevens Arms & Tool Company (1886–1916); J. Stevens Arms Company (1916-1945); Stevens Arms (1945–1991; 1999–present)
- Founded: 1864; 162 years ago
- Founder: Joshua Stevens
- Headquarters: Chicopee Falls, Massachusetts, U.S.
- Key people: W.B. Fay and James Taylor
- Products: Rifles, pistols, shotguns
- Parent: Savage Arms
- Website: http://www.savagearms.com

Stevens Arms is an American firearms manufacturer founded by Joshua Stevens in 1864 in Chicopee, Massachusetts. The company introduced the .22 Long Rifle round and made a number of rifle, shotgun, and target pistol designs. By 1902, they were advertising themselves as "the largest producers of sporting arms in the world". They were purchased by New England Westinghouse on May 28, 1915, and again by Savage Arms on April 1, 1920. As a division of Savage, Stevens continued to produce firearms at their Chicopee Falls facility until 1960 when the plant was torn down and Stevens production was moved into other Savage facilities. Savage dropped the Stevens name in 1991, but revived it in 1999 and still uses it today for a number of its low cost rifles and shotguns.

== History ==
Stevens Arms was founded by Joshua Stevens with help from backers W.B. Fay and James Taylor in Chicopee Falls, Massachusetts, in 1864 as J. Stevens & Co. Their earliest product was a tip-up action single shot pistol.

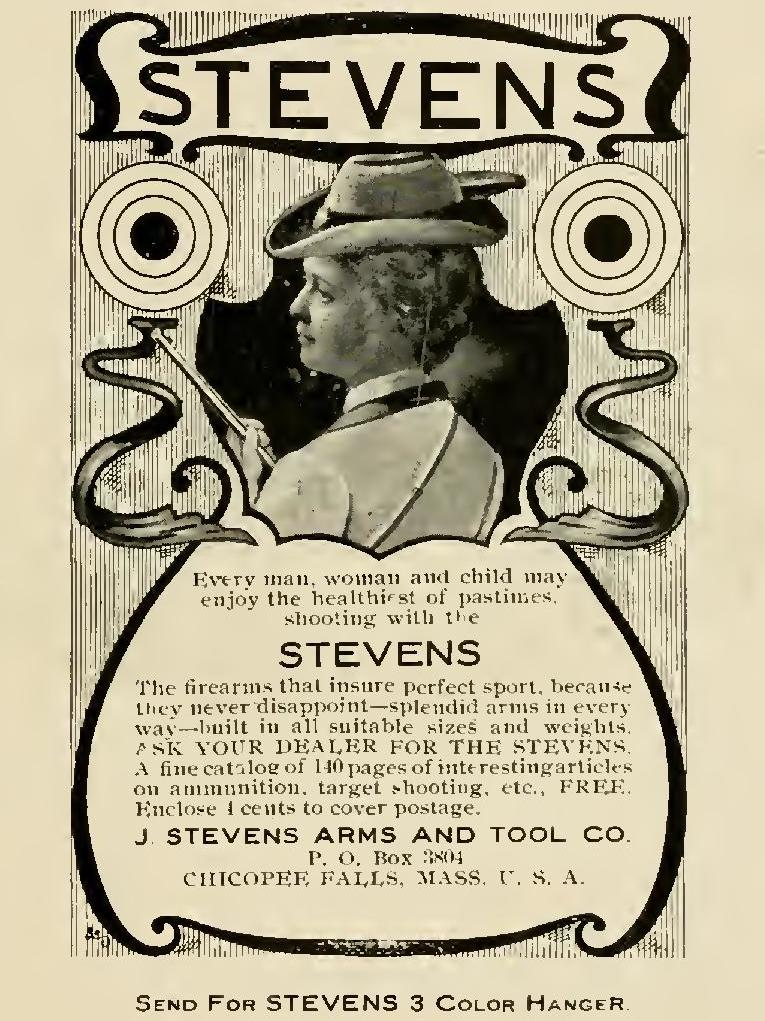
1906 ad in the yearbook of West Virginia University

Business was slow in 1870 when Stevens occupied a converted grist mill and had just sixty employees. The Panic of 1873 had a further negative impact on sales. By 1876 the company had recovered to the extent that it was then manufacturing twice the number of shotguns as it had been before that year. In 1883 they purchased the Massachusetts Arms Company which Joshua Stevens had helped found in 1850. In 1886, the company was reorganized and incorporated as J. Stevens Arms & Tool Co. The business was able to grow steadily with tool manufacturing and sales now accounting for the bulk of the business output.

Stevens and Taylor were bought out in 1896 by I.H. Page, who was one of the new partners and the bookkeeper. Page led the company to significant growth, such that by 1902 Stevens had 900 employees and was considered one of the top sporting firearms manufacturers in the world. In 1901, Stevens entered into a partnership with J. Frank Duryea to produce the Stevens-Duryea automobile manufactured at a separate facility also in Chicopee Falls. In 1915, Stevens led the U.S. arms business in target and small game guns.

On May 28, 1915, New England Westinghouse, a division of Westinghouse Electric, purchased Stevens. New England Westinghouse was created specifically to fulfill a contract to produce 1.8 million Mosin-Nagant rifles for Czar Nicholas II of Russia for use in World War I. They needed a firearms manufacturing facility to accomplish this and chose Stevens. After the purchase, they sold off the tool making division, halted production of Stevens-Duryea automobiles, and, on July 1, 1916, renamed the firearms division the J. Stevens Arms Company. When the Bolsheviks deposed the Czar in 1917, New England Westinghouse was never paid, and it fell into financial distress. They managed to sell most of the rifles to the U.S. Government and keep the Stevens firearms facility operational and did return to limited production of civilian firearms between 1917 and 1920 while looking for a buyer for Stevens.

Stevens was purchased by the Savage Arms Company on April 1, 1920, with Stevens operating as a subsidiary of Savage but in a semi-independent status until 1942. This merger made Savage the largest producer of arms in the United States at the time.

On July 9, 2019, Vista Outdoor completed the sale of Savage Arms and Stevens Arms for $170 million to a group of investors led by Savage's management. Vista received immediate gross proceeds of $158 million and a $12-million five-year note. Vista said it would use this money, after paying associated taxes, to reduce its debt.

== Ammunition ==
In 1887, Stevens developed the .22 Long Rifle round, which served as an introductory caliber for children for decades, as well as being very popular for plinking, varmint hunting, and target shooting. The .22 Long Rifle cartridge was available beginning in 1888, in the #1, #2, #9, and #10 break-top rifles, and in their New Model Pocket and Bicycle rifles. The .22 Long Rifle would outperform other Stevens rounds, such as the .25 Stevens and .25 Stevens Short, designed as competitors, and offered in models such as the lever action single-shot Favorite (produced between 1894 and 1935) and the Crack Shot #15 (introduced in 1900).

As several manufacturers would later do with other wildcats, Stevens adopted the .25-20 single shot, developed by J. Francis Rabbeth in 1882. The unpopularity of the bottlenecked case led Stevens to develop the .25-21 Stevens in 1897. Designed by Capt. W. L. Carpenter, 9th U.S. Infantry, the .25-21 Stevens was essentially a shortened version of the company's own .25-25 Stevens of 1895. (This is an odd reversal of the relationship of the .38 S&W Special to the .357 Magnum.) The .25-25 Stevens would be used in Stevens' model 44 and the model 44½ rifles manufactured from 1903.

== Rifles ==
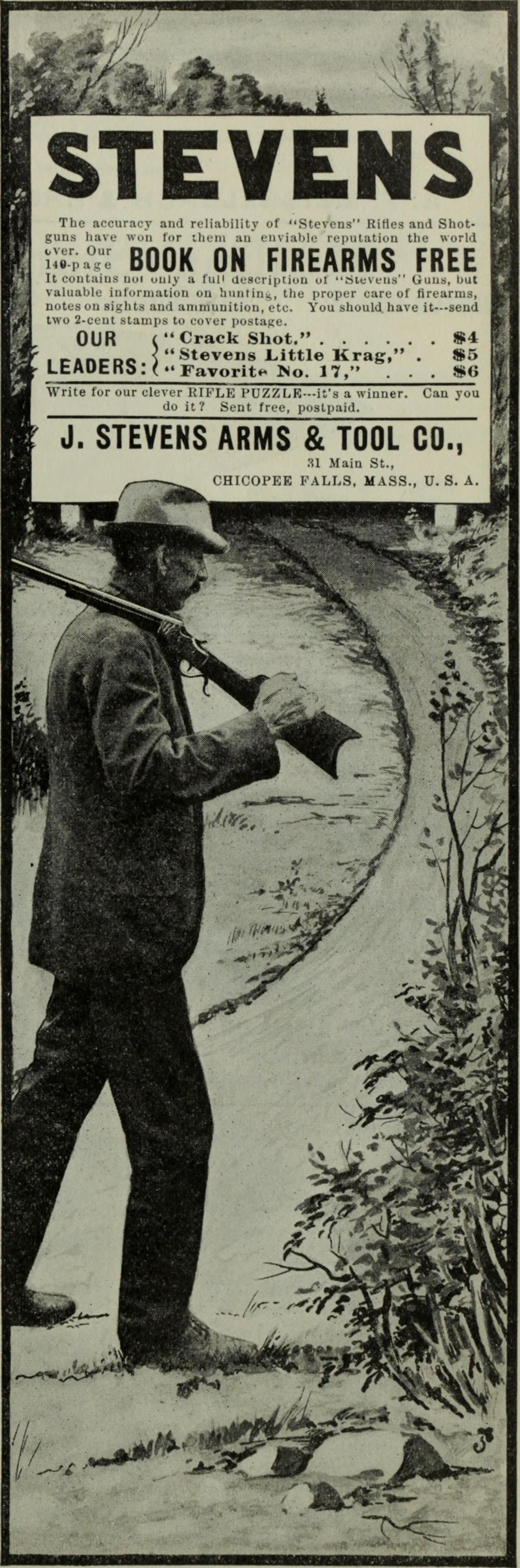
Stevens Arms advertisement

In 1880, the company began making falling block rifles. These, though less well known than Ballard or Winchester firearms, were of comparable quality. They were priced lower than those of Ballard or Winchester, making the Stevens' falling block models competitive in the marketplace. Under names like Favorite, Little Scout, Crack Shot, and Marksman, Stevens sold millions of reliable single-shots. The total number of single-shot firearms manufactured by the company exceeded 3.5 million by 1892.

Stevens, under the ownership of New England Westinghouse, produced over 770,000 Mosin-Nagant rifles under contract with the Russian government between 1916 and 1917, of which 225,260 were delivered. The rest were sold to the American government to arm the American Expeditionary Forces, White Russian forces, Finland, and the Civilian Marksmanship Program.

The 416 had a dramatically oversized bull barrel and a large wooden stock. The heavy barrel design added a great deal of weight which compared unfavorably with larger rifles such as the military's various .30 caliber offerings. It had adjustable peep sight apertures, a hooded front sight, and a small, removable magazine.

During World War II, Savage used Stevens' facilities to produce several military firearms including the Savage Lee–Enfield No. 4 rifle, the Thompson submachine gun, the Browning Automatic Rifle (BAR), and the Browning M1919 and M2 machineguns.

Stevens introduced the Model 87 in 1938, which sold over one million units. Further units were sold as the Savage Model 6 by Sears. It was discontinued in 1982.

== Shotguns ==
Starting in 1872, Stevens began producing single-barreled shotguns based on their tip-up rifles and pistols. The first was the Model 30 offered in 14 gauge but soon followed by 10, 12, 16, and 20 gauges.

In 1876, Stevens produced its first double-barreled shotgun, the Three Trigger Model, which used a third trigger to unlock the action, and was offered in 10 and 12 gauges.

Between 1900 and 1916, Stevens produced 26 single-barreled shotgun models, eight exposed hammer double-barreled models, and seven hammerless double-barreled models including a sidelock design, the Model 250, as well as a .410 bore bolt-action shotgun with three-shot detachable magazine.

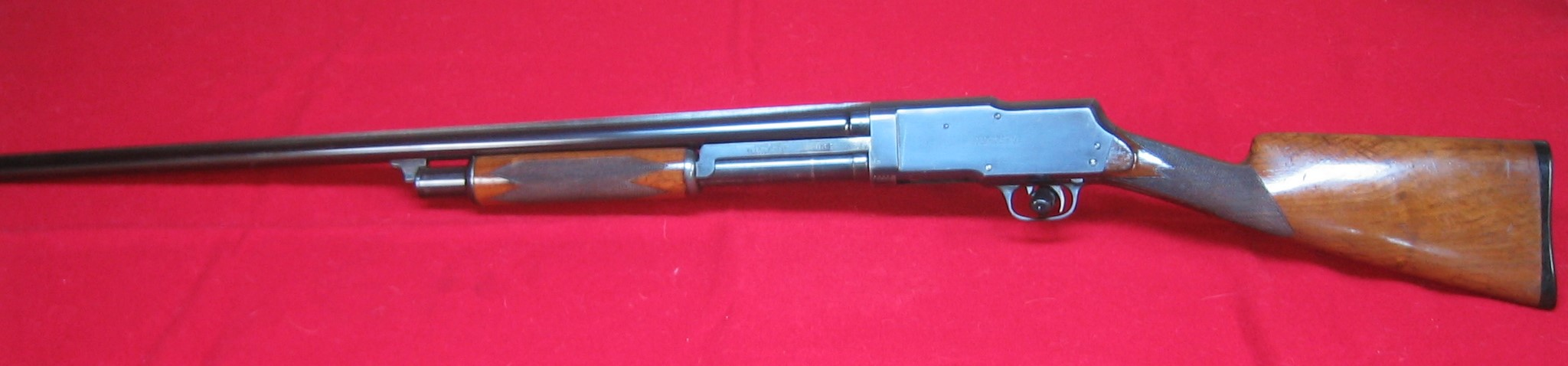
Stevens 522 Trap Gun

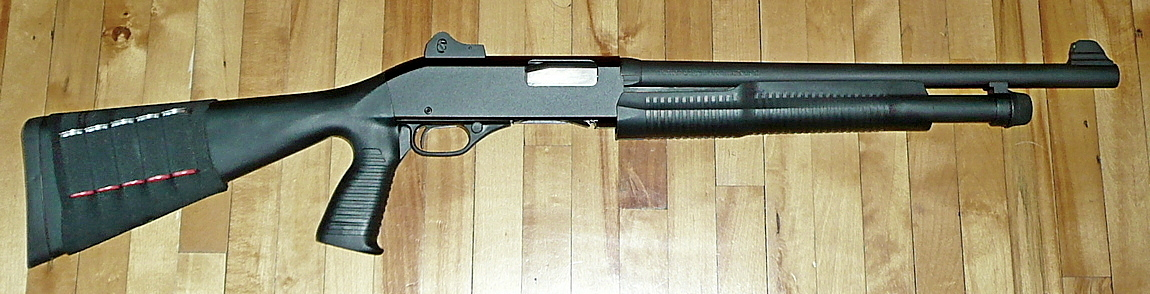
Stevens 320 Security pump shotgun 12Ga 18.5 inch barrel

In 1907, Stevens was approached by John Browning and offered the design of a pump-action, hammerless, take-down, repeating shotgun that would become the Model 520 and 620 shotguns. The Model 520, easily recognized by its distinctive double-hump receiver, first appeared in Stevens' 1909 Catalog #52 and remained in production until 1939.

In 1927, Stevens produced the Model 620, a streamlined version of the 520, and it remained in production until 1955. Stevens provided a prototype Model 520 trench gun to the American military in 1918 for use in World War I but it was never produced in quantity. Both the Model 520A and 620A were produced (as the M520-30 and M620) for military use during World War II, in trench, riot, and training variants. Over 45,000 were made during World War II and many remained in service through the Vietnam War.

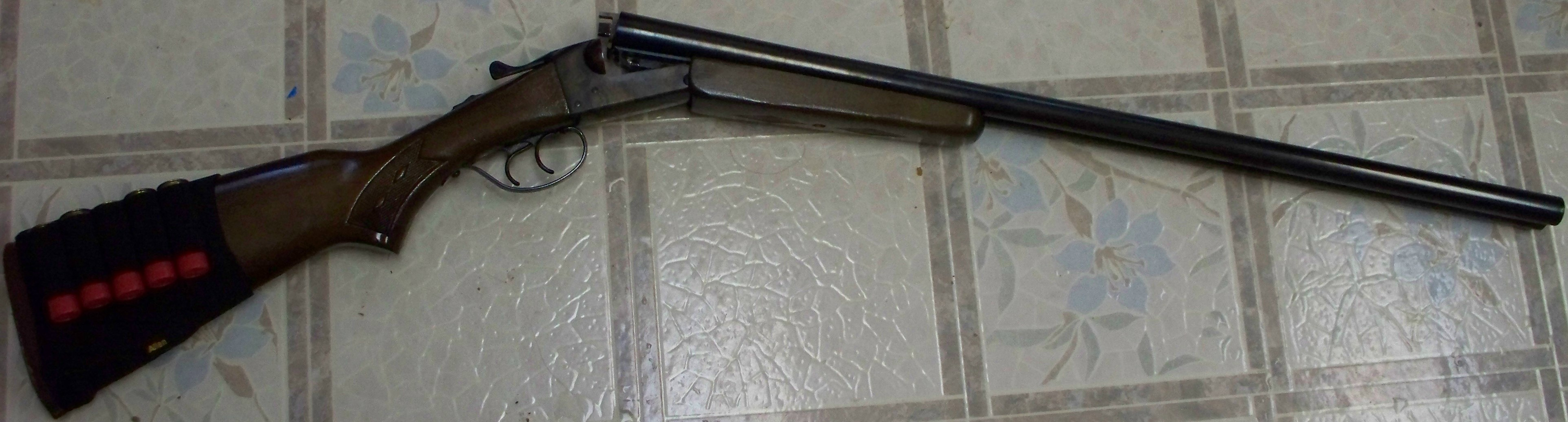
Stevens 511A shotgun.

== Target pistols ==
Joshua Stevens produced three lines of single-shot tip-up target pistols named after contemporary gunmen.

- Stevens-Conlin No. 38 – named for James Conlin, owner of a Broadway Avenue shooting gallery in New York City.
- Stevens-Lord No. 36 – named for Frank Lord, a prominent target shooter. Six hundred were produced from 1880 to 1886.
- Stevens-Gould No. 37 – named for Arthur Corbin Gould, a firearms expert and writer.

Two well-known examples of the Stevens-Lord No. 36 were custom ordered by Buffalo Bill, serial no. 29 for himself and serial no. 32 as a gift for Ben Thompson. The deluxe set of pistols had ten-inch barrels chambered for .32 Colt, iridescent mother-of-pearl grips, and custom engraving with gold inlay by Louis Daniel Nimschke. The one given to Thompson included "From Buffalo Bill to Ben Thompson" on the spine of the grip.

An engraved, gold-plated Stevens-Gould No. 37 was given to sharpshooter Annie Oakley in the 1890s by her husband Frank Butler. The pistol had finely engraved dog and horse head motifs on both sides of the frame. The Stevens-Gould No. 37 was one of three embellished guns cased for Oakley as a presentation group.
