= Mossberg Maverick 88 =

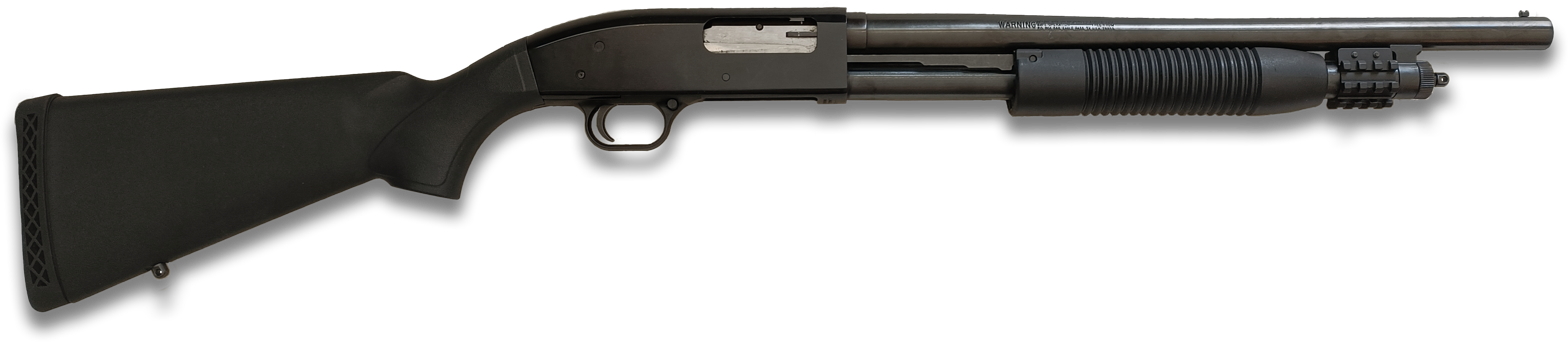
- 12 gauge Maverick 88 with 18.5-inch barrel
- Type: Shotgun
- Place of origin: United States

Production history
- Manufacturer: O.F. Mossberg & Sons
- Unit cost: US$165–US$250 (approx.)
- Produced: 1988–present

Specifications (Security)
- Mass: 6 pounds (2.7 kg)
- Barrel length: 18.5, 20, 22, 26 or 28 inches (47, 51, 56, 66 or 71 cm)
- Cartridge: 12 or 20 Gauge 2-3/4" or 3"
- Action: Pump action
- Feed system: 5+1 or 7+1 round tube magazine

The Mossberg Maverick 88 is a pump action shotgun manufactured for O.F. Mossberg & Sons. Factory Maverick 88s feature a black plastic stock and forearm, a cylinder bore (although interchangeable chokes are available on some hunting models), and cross-bolt safety. Most accessories not dealing with the trigger, safety, or pump forearm are interchangeable with a Mossberg 500.

== Overview ==
The Maverick line of shotguns is assembled in Eagle Pass, Texas, using some parts manufactured outside of the United States, mainly from Mexico, which contributes to their relatively lower price in comparison to the Mossberg 500 series of shotguns.

The trigger groups will not interchange between Maverick 88 and Mossberg 500 models, but the majority of other parts, including barrels, stocks, and magazine tubes, will (the barrel and magazines must be the same length). Maverick 88s do not come equipped with any sling mounts (except the security model), as the Mossberg 500 series does.

Maverick 88 shotguns feature a trigger guard-mounted cross-bolt safety as opposed to a top tang safety, which is used on the Mossberg 500 series.

Early Model 88s were equipped with a single slide action bar, but this was updated to a dual slide action bar in 1990. Also the Maverick 88 does not have a receiver top pre-drilled and tapped for a Weaver scope mount rail.

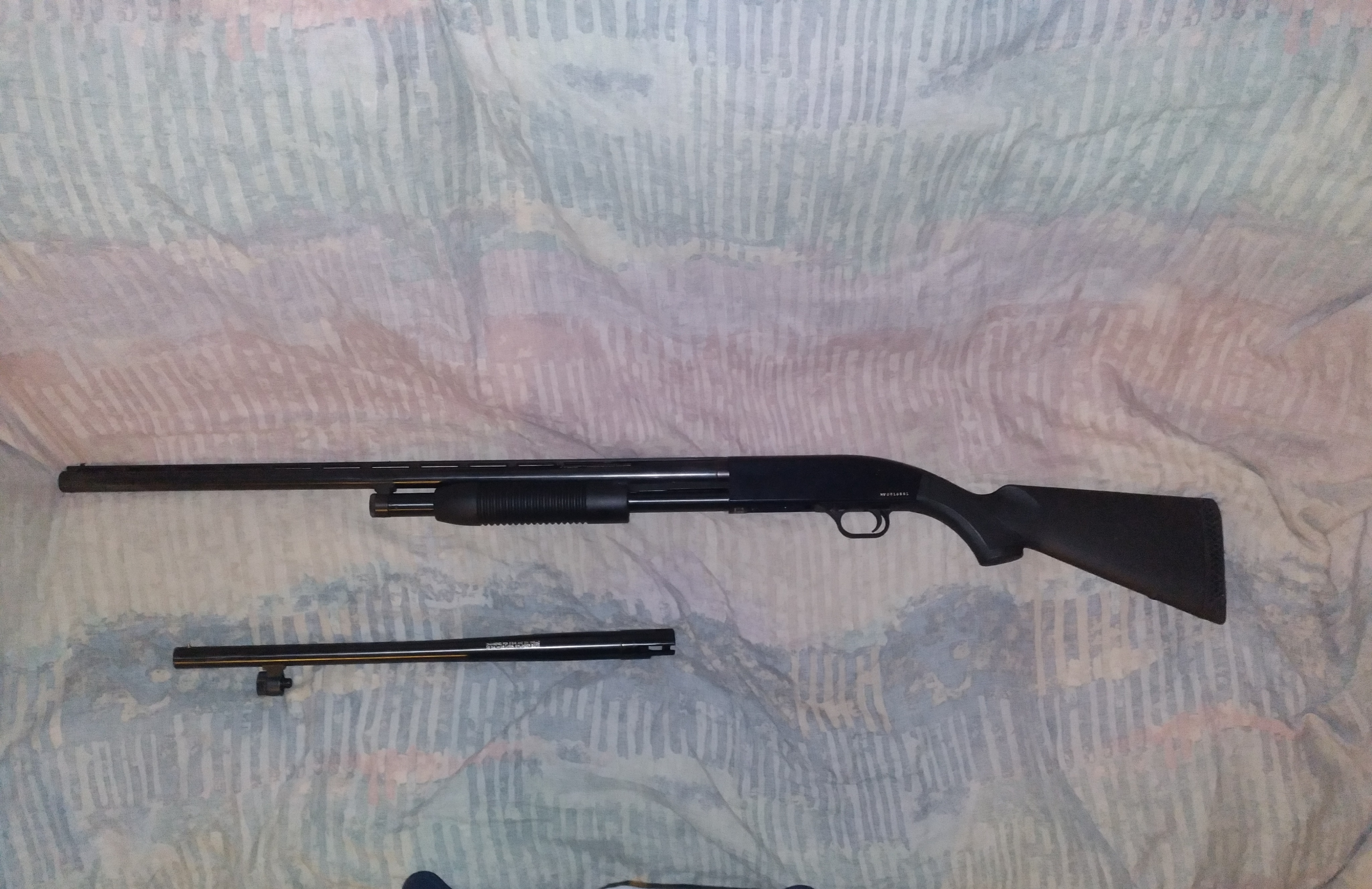
Maverick 88 with 28 inch barrel with detached 18 inch barrel as a set.

Maverick 88s are factory finished with steel bluing only, whereas Mossberg 500s have factory-blued, nickel-plated or parkerized (barrel/magazine) options.

There are four models of the 88, All-Purpose, Security, Security w/ Top-Folding Stock and Slug. The All Purpose model comes in 12 gauge with a 28-inch barrel, or 20 gauge with 26-inch barrel or 22-inch barrel with vent rib (youth version). Security comes with an 18 1/2-inch or 20-inch non-vent-rib barrel. The Security w/ Top-Folding Stock comes in 18 1/2-inch only, featuring a pistol grip. The Slug model comes with 24-inch barrels and is available Cylinder Bore or Fully Rifled Bore. Both feature adjustable rifle sights,

The 88s have a cartridge capacity of 5 in the tube magazine and 1 in the chamber and cannot have their magazines easily extended without machining. The Security Models have a capacity of 6 in the tube with the 18.5" barrel, 7 with 20" barrel with both allowing 1 in the chamber. Magazine capacity is further limited, if loading 3-inch shells, to 4 in the tube magazine and 1 in the chamber.

The All-Purpose models comes from the factory with a black synthetic stock and fore-end. Security models come in black or Flat Dark Earth stock and fore-end. Sling swivels are not included. However, they can be installed to allow the use of a sling.

== Variants ==
- Maverick Model 91 (discontinued), using a version of the Mossberg 835 receiver and capable of chambering 3.5 inch shells, limited production.

== See also ==
- Serbu Super-Shorty Compact derivative of the Mossberg Maverick
