= Mossberg 183 =

Mossberg 183D
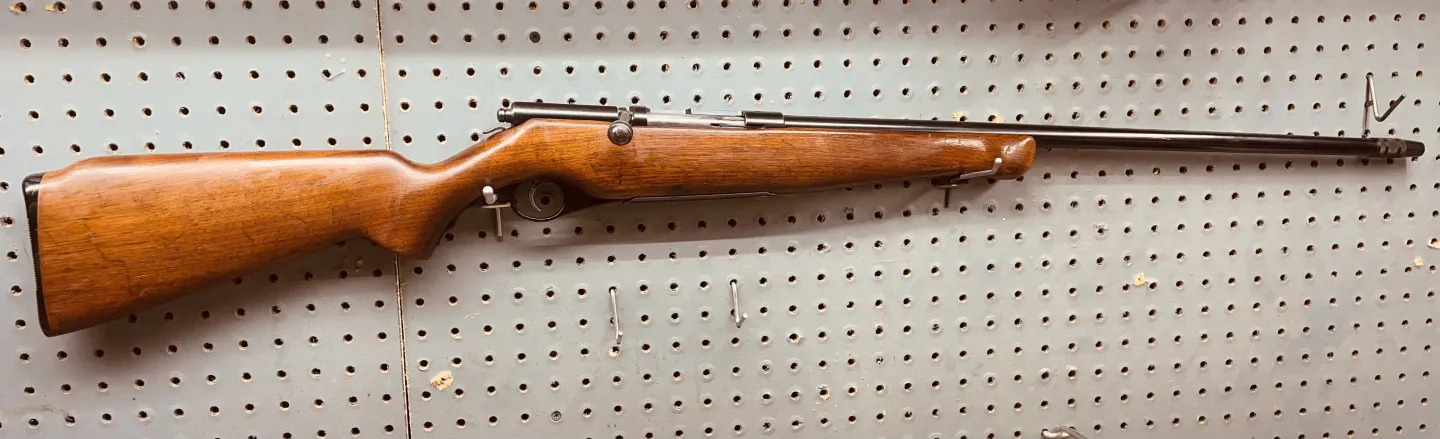
- Mossberg 183D-B 1953 with Mossberg410F Choke
- Type: Shotgun
- Place of origin: United States

Production history
- Manufacturer: O.F. Mossberg & Sons
- Produced: 1947 – 1971
- No. built: 2
- Variants: 183D, 183K

Specifications
- Mass: 5.5 lb (2.49 kg)
- Barrel length: 23 in (584 mm)
- Cartridge: .410 bore, 2½ & 3"
- Action: Bolt action
- Feed system: 2 shell, fixed top loading magazine, 3 rounds total

The Mossberg 183 is a .410 bore bolt-action shotgun, produced between 1947 and 1986 by O.F. Mossberg & Sons in New Haven, Connecticut.

== Variants ==
=== D ===
The original model produced from 1947-1948. It had a plain one-piece pistol grip stock. The gun was distributed with two choke tubes (modified and full), which mount by screwing to the outside of the barrel, as opposed to the inside, like the Remington 870 or other modern shotguns. The shotgun was shipped with a wrench for removing the choke tubes.

==== D-A ====
Model 183D-A Bolt Action Repeater, left hand extractor added. Made 1948-1950.

==== D-B ====
Model 183D-B Bolt Action Repeater, firing pin design change. Made 1950-1953.

==== D-C ====
Model 183D-C Bolt Action Repeater, ejector interrupter added. Made 1953-1956.

==== D-D ====
Model 183D-D Bolt Action Repeater, change to ejector interrupter. Made 1956-1960.

==== D-E ====
Model 183D-E Bolt Action Repeater, Slimmer barrel. Made 1960-1963.

==== D-F ====
Model 183D-F Bolt Action Repeater, change to trigger and safety lever. Made 1968-1971.

==== D-G ====
Model 183D-G Bolt Action Repeater, change to barrel and front sight. Made 1968-1971.

=== K ===
The 183K is similar to the 183D, but had a "C-Lect-Choke", which allowed the shooter to vary the choke between four settings without changing adaptors (as with the 183D). Weight 5 1/2 lbs, barrel, 25" with variable C-Lect-Choke. Genuine walnut one piece Monte Carlo stock, later models walnut finish. Made 1953-1956.

==== K-A ====
Model 183K-A Bolt Action Repeater, firing pin design change. Made 1956-1960.

==== K-B ====
Model 183K-B Bolt Action Repeater, Slimmer barrel. Made 1960-1963.

==== K-C ====
Model 183K-C Bolt Action Repeater, change to trigger and safety lever. Made 1963-1986.

==== K-D ====
Model 183K-D Bolt Action Repeater, change to barrel and front sight. Made 1968-1986.

==== K-E ====
Model 183K-E Bolt Action Repeater, same as 183KD, shorter trigger guard, rubber recoil pad added. Made 1971-1986.

==== T ====
Model 183T Bolt Action Repeater, economy version 410 BA repeater with 24” bbl., fixed full choke, TA & TB minor changes in sights and stocks. Made 1968-1978
