= New Haven 600 =

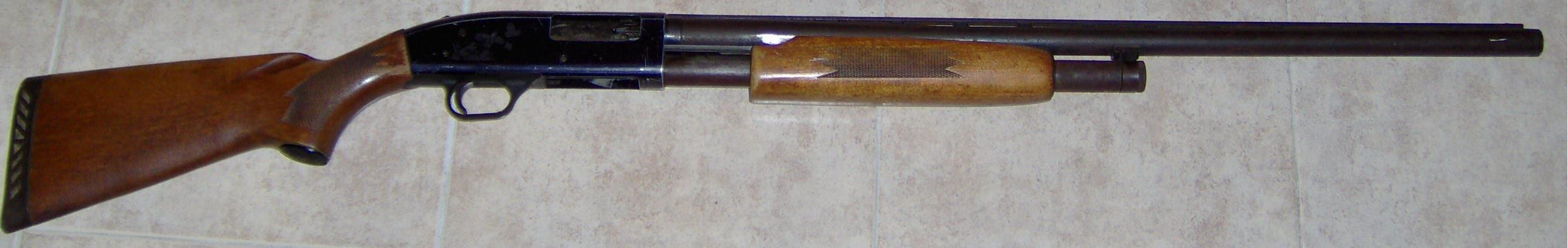
- New Haven 600AT
- Type: Shotgun
- Place of origin: United States

Service history
- In service: 1977–present

Production history
- Designed: 1960
- Manufacturer: O.F. Mossberg & Sons
- Produced: 1977–1998

Specifications
- Mass: 3.3 kg empty - varies loaded
- Length: varies with model
- Barrel length: 14 to 30 inches (350 to 762 mm)
- Caliber: 12 gauge, 16 gauge, 20 gauge, .410 bore
- Action: pump-action
- Effective firing range: 40 m
- Feed system: 5 to 8 rounds; internal tube magazine

New Haven 600 is a series of pump-action shotguns manufactured by O.F. Mossberg & Sons on behalf of department stores, most notably the Montgomery Ward Company, Western Auto, and other retail stores. New Haven is one of O.F. Mossberg & Sons' private, promotional brands. The New Haven 600 is identical to the Mossberg 500 from O.F. Mossberg & Sons, with the addition of an anti-rattle system in the magazine tube, and the top of the receiver is not drilled out of a scope mount. Many of the 600AT models came with adjustable C-Lect Chokes. The 600 series comprises widely varying models of hammerless, pump action repeaters, all of which share the same basic receiver and action, but differ in bore size, barrel length, choke options, magazine capacity, and "furniture" (stock and forearm) materials.

== Model numbers ==
- 600AT = 12 gauge
- 600AST= 12 gauge slug barrel iron sights
- 600BT = 16 gauge
- 600CT = 20 gauge
- 600ET = .410 bore

== See also ==
- Mossberg 500
- O.F. Mossberg & Sons
- Pump-action shotgun
