= .25 Stevens Short =

Rifle cartridge

- Type: Rifle
- Place of origin: United States

Production history
- Designed: 1902
- Produced: 1902–1942

Specifications
- Case type: Rimmed, straight
- Bullet diameter: .251 in (6.4 mm)
- Neck diameter: .276 in (7.0 mm)
- Base diameter: .276 in (7.0 mm)
- Rim diameter: .333 in (8.5 mm)
- Case length: .599 in (15.2 mm)
- Overall length: .877 in (22.3 mm)
- Primer type: Rimfire
- Maximum pressure: 12,000–15,000 psi (82.74–103.42 MPa)

Ballistic performance
Bullet mass/type	Velocity	Energy
65 gr (4 g) (smokeless)	950 ft/s (290 m/s)	130 ft⋅lbf (180 J)
- Sources: Barnes & Amber 1972

The .25 Stevens Short was an American rimfire rifle cartridge, introduced in 1902.

Developed by J. Stevens Arms & Tool Company, it was intended to be a lower cost, less potent variant of the .25 Stevens, on which it was based. It initially used a 4.5 to 5 gr (0.29 to 0.32 g) black powder charge; this was later replaced by smokeless. It was offered in Stevens, Remington, and Winchester rifles, and could be used in any .25 Stevens rifle, also (in the way the .38 Special can be fired in weapons chambered for .357 Magnum).

It was more powerful than the .22 Short, as well as less expensive, but more costly than the .22 Long Rifle and offering no edge in performance. It was also inferior to its parent cartridge. As a result, it was not a popular hunting round.

The cartridge continued to be commercially available until 1942.

== Sources ==
- Barnes, Frank C., ed. by John T. Amber. ".25 Stevens Short", in Cartridges of the World, pp. 276 & 282–3. Northfield, IL: DBI Books, 1972. ISBN 0-695-80326-3.
- ______ and _____. ".25 Stevens", in Cartridges of the World, p. 276. Northfield, IL: DBI Books, 1972. ISBN 0-695-80326-3.
