= Stevens Model 87 =

- Type: Semi-automatic rifle
- Place of origin: United States

Production history
- Designer: Savage/Stevens Arms
- Designed: 1930s
- Produced: 1938–1982
- No. built: +1,800,000
- Variants: see variants

Specifications
- Mass: 5.5 lb (2.5 kg)
- Length: 44 in (1,118 mm)
- Barrel length: 24 in (610 mm)
- Cartridge: .22 Short, .22 Long, .22 Long Rifle
- Action: Direct blowback
- Feed system: tubular magazine; capacity is either 15 rounds for .22 Long Rifle, 17 rounds for .22 Long or 22 rounds for .22 Short
- Sights: adjustable open rear, ramp front sight

The Stevens Model 87, also known as the Savage Model 6, is a semi-automatic rifle that fires the .22 Short, .22 Long and .22 Long Rifle rimfire cartridges.

Produced by Stevens Arms in Chicopee Falls, Massachusetts, from 1938 to 1960 & then Westfield, Massachusetts from 1960 to 1982, it was in continuous production from 1938 to 1982. Nicknamed Gill Guns (because of 8 cutout slots (or “Gills”) located on the side of the receiver that help shoot powder residue out of the chamber to let the rifle run cleaner) as well as Click Clacks, it was the most popular rimfire rifle of its kind in the world until the introduction of the Marlin Model 60 in 1960.

== Variants ==
Prior to 1949, there was no alpha code used to date the development of the rifle. After 1949 thru 1970, alpha codes were added beside the model number (Model 87 or Model 6). Alpha codes date the year the rifle was manufactured. Alpha codes are listed below:

A=1949, B=1950, C=1951, D=1952, E=1953, F=1954, G=1955, H=1956, I=1957, J=1958, K=1959, L=1960, M=1961, N=1962, P=1963, R=1964, S=1965, T=1966, U=1967, V=1968, W=1969, X=1970 (Note O and Q were not used)

== Model 887 ==
Stevens Model 887
- Type: Semi-automatic rifle
- Place of origin: United States

Production history
- Designer: Savage/Stevens Arms
- Produced: 1978–1980

Specifications
- Mass: 5.5 lb (2.5 kg)
- Length: 44 in (1,118 mm)
- Barrel length: 21 in (533 mm)
- Cartridge: .22 Short, .22 Long, .22 Long Rifle
- Action: Direct blowback
- Feed system: tubular magazine; capacity is either 15 rounds for .22 Long Rifle, 17 rounds for .22 Long or 22 rounds for .22 Short
- Sights: adjustable open rear, ramp front sight

The Stevens Model 887 is a semi-automatic rifle that fires the .22 Short, .22 Long and .22 Long Rifle rimfire cartridges. Design to be an improvement over the original Model 87 (including two “Gills” instead of 8 and an aluminum magazine tube instead of steel), it was manufactured for only two years from 1978 to 1980.
