= .25-25 Stevens =

Centerfire rifle cartridge

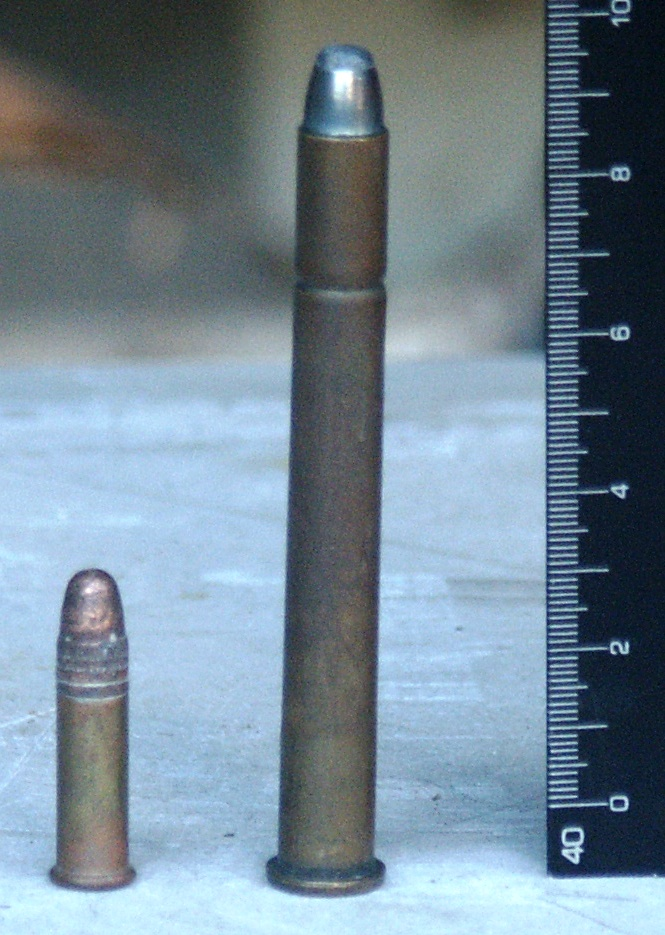
- .25-25 Stevens (rt) with .22 long rifle for comparison
- Type: centerfire rifle
- Place of origin: United States

Production history
- Designed: 1895

Specifications
- Case type: rimmed straight
- Bullet diameter: .257 in (6.5 mm)
- Neck diameter: .282 in (7.2 mm)
- Base diameter: .323 in (8.2 mm)
- Rim diameter: .376 in (9.6 mm)
- Case length: 2.37 in (60 mm)
- Overall length: 2.63 in (67 mm)
- Primer type: boxer, small rifle

Ballistic performance
Bullet mass/type	Velocity	Energy
86 gr (6 g) (smokeless, factory load)	1,500 ft/s (460 m/s)	434 ft⋅lbf (588 J)
86 gr (6 g) (5.5 gr (0.36 g) smokeless)	1,525 ft/s (465 m/s)	448 ft⋅lbf (607 J)
- Sources: Barnes & Amber 1972

The .25-25 Stevens was an American centerfire rifle cartridge.

Designed by Capt. W. L. Carpenter, 9th U.S. Infantry, in 1895, the .25-25 Stevens was the company's first straight-cased cartridge. It was used in Stevens' single shot Model 44, as well as the Model 44 1/2 rifles, which first went on sale in 1903. In addition, it was available in the Remington-Hepburn target rifle.

While the .25-25 was popular, the .25-21 offered "practically the same performance and was a little cleaner shooting." It also suffered a "freakish" appearance, due to its length to diameter ratio. It was also found that the usual 20 or 21 gr (1.30 or 1.36 g) black powder charge of the shorter 25-21 offered "practically the same ballistics" as 24 or 25 gr (1.56 or 1.62 g) in the .25-25.

The switch to smokeless powder only exacerbated the problem, due to the small charge. To cure this, handloaders use a mix of 3 to 5 gr (0.19 to 0.32 g) of bulk shotgun powder and 18 to 20 gr (1.2 to 1.3 g) of black powder, with bullets of between 60 and 86 gr (3.9 and 5.6 g).

The bore diameter of the .25-25 Stevens is .250 inches (6.35 mm) making it a ".25"/6.35 mm caliber" cartridge, not to be confused with the more well known 6.5 mm bore caliber which uses 6.7 mm/.264" bullets.

== Sources ==
- Frank C. Barnes (1972). Cartridges of the world. Digest Books. ISBN 978-0-695-80326-1.
