= Mossberg Brownie =

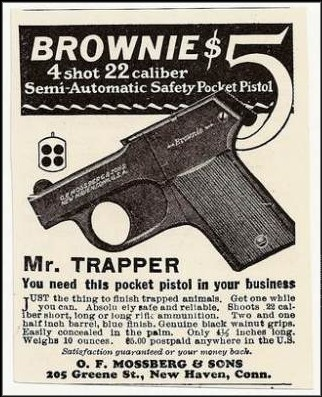
- Advertisement for a Mossberg Brownie, inaccurately described as "semi-automatic"
- Type: Multiple-barrel pistol

Production history
- Produced: 1919–1932

Specifications
- Barrel length: 2.5 inches (6.4 cm)
- Cartridge: .22 LR & .22 Short
- Barrels: 4
- Action: Double action, striker fired
- Sights: Iron

The Mossberg Brownie is a four shot, .22 long rifle pistol, similar to a derringer or pepperbox, produced by O.F. Mossberg & Sons from 1920 to 1932. The Brownie is based on an earlier pistol patented and licensed to the Shattuck Company by Oscar Mossberg.

== Design ==
The pistol has a double-action trigger and a rotating firing pin. Each pull of the trigger cocks and releases the hammer as well as rotating the firing pin to fire each chamber in succession. A top-mounted latch released the barrel assembly to open forward. Mossberg provided a piece of bent sheet metal to extract spent casings.

From 1986 to 1987, Advantage Arms produced the model 422 with many features of the Brownie. The Advantage Arms design was also produced in a .22 Winchester Magnum Rimfire chambering, and models featured an internal extractor.

Cobray also produced an odd revolver called the "Pocket Pal" that featured the same break action, layout, and hammer system of the Brownie. Cobray combined this with a unique twin-barrel, dual-caliber system. Two "zig-zag" revolving cylinders were provided, one in .22 LR and the other in .380 ACP. The same hammer fired either the .22 caliber in the bottom barrel or the .380 in the top, depending on which cylinder was installed.

== See also ==
- Derringer
- COP .357 Derringer
