= .25 Stevens =

Rifle cartridge

- Type: Rifle and handgun
- Place of origin: United States

Production history
- Designed: 1898–1900
- Produced: 1900–1942

Specifications
- Case type: Rimmed, straight
- Bullet diameter: .251 in (6.4 mm)
- Neck diameter: .276 in (7.0 mm)
- Base diameter: .276 in (7.0 mm)
- Rim diameter: .333 in (8.5 mm)
- Case length: 1.125 in (28.6 mm)
- Overall length: 1.395 in (35.4 mm)
- Primer type: Rimfire
- Maximum pressure: 14,000–16,000 psi (96.53–110.32 MPa)

Ballistic performance
| Bullet mass/type | Velocity | Energy |
|---|---|---|
| 65 gr (4 g) (smokeless) | 1,180 ft/s (360 m/s) | 208 ft⋅lbf (282 J) |
- Sources: Barnes & Amber 1972

The .25 Stevens / 6.4x28mmRF was an American rimfire rifle cartridge. To differentiate from the related .25 Stevens Short it is sometimes also referred to as .25 Stevens Long.

Developed by J. Stevens Arms & Tool Company and Peters Cartridge Company, it was developed between 1898 and 1900; catalogs suggest it was introduced in 1898, but most sources agree on 1900. It was offered in the Crack Shot No. 15 rifle, which debuted in 1900. It was also available in the Stevens Favorite rifle, which was first released in 1894 and discontinued in 1935. It originally used a 10 to 11 gr (0.65 to 0.71 g) black powder charge under a 67 gr (4.3 g) slug; this was later replaced by Smokeless powder.

Some handguns were also chambered for .25 Stevens, most notably the Stevens-Lord single-shot pistols.

The round was available with either solid lead or hollow point bullets and developed a good reputation for small game (such as rabbit) and varmints.

In comparison to the .22 Long Rifle some sources note that its ballistics suffered from an excessively high trajectory for a rifle cartridge (a drop of 5.1 in (130 mm) at 100 yd (91 m)), while others praise its inherent accuracy, and larger versatility due to being much more powerful, especially when used in revolvers.

Serving as the parent for the less-successful .25 Stevens Short and experimental Remington .267 Rimfire, it was dropped in 1942.

Notable handgun authority Elmer Keith lamented its demise and advocated its revival for use in revolvers.
