= Mossberg 9200 =

Shotgun

- Type: Shotgun
- Place of origin: United States

Production history
- Designer: O.F. Mossberg & Sons
- Designed: 1992
- Manufacturer: O.F. Mossberg & Sons
- Produced: Until 2001
- Variants: See Variants

Specifications
- Mass: varies with model
- Length: varies with model
- Barrel length: 18.5 in (470 mm) to 28 in (710 mm)
- Cartridge: 2 3/4-in or 3-inch 12 gauge shot shell
- Caliber: 12 gauge
- Action: Gas operated
- Muzzle velocity: 403 m/s (1,325 ft/s) for 12 gauge, 2 3/4-inch, 00 buckshot load 475 m/s (1,560 ft/s) for 12-gauge 437 grain rifled slug
- Effective firing range: 40 m
- Maximum firing range: 100 m
- Feed system: 2 to 4 rounds; internal tube magazine
- Sights: Front bead, ramp, or ghost ring sight depending on model

The Mossberg 9200 is a 12-gauge semi-automatic series of shotguns designed by O.F. Mossberg & Sons that was made until 2001.

== Features ==
The Mossberg 9200 series of shotguns are autoloading, gas-operated shotguns. Consistent with all Mossberg shotguns, this model series has the same ambidextrous thumb-operated safety switch positioned in the middle of the receiver. The Mossberg 9200 series uses 2 3/4 or 3 inch Magnum shells. The 9200A1 was specifically designed to use 2 3/4-inch "maximum load" rounds such as #00 Buck.

== Variants ==
Two main versions were made: the 9200 and 9200A1. The 9200 was a general platform with several grades of finish and features and primarily intended for hunting and sport shooting. Versions of the 9200 include Crown Grade, Combo, Camo, and Viking. The Crown Grade model had a high-quality Walnut hardwood stock, polished blued finish, and a 22, 24, 26, or 28 inch vent-rib or slug barrel. The Camo models all had a synthetic stock, 24 inch vent-rib barrel and were camouflage coated. The Combo was a Crown Grade model with multiple barrel options included, and the Viking model had a synthetic stock and more rugged finish. Mossberg also produced a "Persuader" model under their "Special Purpose" line which had a parkerized finish, a synthetic stock, and an 18.5 inch barrel and was intended for tactical or law enforcement use.

In May 1998, the US Department of Defense issued a solicitation for a new shotgun called the Joint Service Combat Shotgun (JSCS) program. The JSCS program was tasked with choosing a successor shotgun to replace the current shotgun models used by the US Military. In response, Mossberg produced a variant of the 9200 called 9200A1 or "Jungle Gun" designed to the JSCS specifications and submitted for review, however, the 9200A1 was not selected. Mossberg also offered the 9200A1 for sale in their catalog through 2000. The 9200A1 had many of the features of the Persuader model, with the addition of a heavier barrel and fixed cylinder choke, however, the 9200A1 did not share barrels with the other 9200 models and had a different gas system design to accommodate the high power ammunition specified in the JSCS solicitation.
