= .25-21 Stevens =

Rifle cartridge

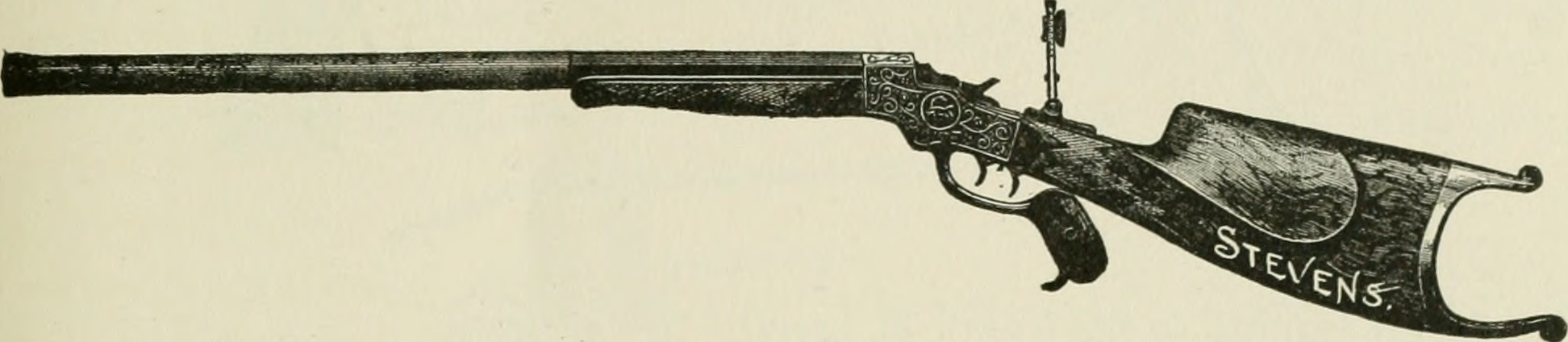
- Type: centerfire rifle
- Place of origin: United States

Production history
- Designed: 1897

Specifications
- Case type: rimmed straight-case
- Bullet diameter: .257 in (6.5 mm)
- Neck diameter: .280 in (7.1 mm)
- Base diameter: .300 in (7.6 mm)
- Rim diameter: .376 in (9.6 mm)
- Case length: 2.05 in (52 mm)
- Overall length: 2.30 in (58 mm)
- Primer type: boxer, small rifle

Ballistic performance
Bullet mass/type	Velocity	Energy
86 gr (6 g) (smokeless, factory load)	1,470 ft/s (450 m/s)	415 ft⋅lbf (563 J)
86 gr (6 g) (9 gr (0.58 g) smokeless)	1,610 ft/s (490 m/s)	498 ft⋅lbf (675 J)
86 gr (6 g) (5 gr (0.32 g) smokeless)	1,500 ft/s (460 m/s)	434 ft⋅lbf (588 J)
- Sources: Barnes & Amber 1972

The .25-21 Stevens is an obsolete and discontinued American centerfire rifle cartridge.

Designed by Capt. W. L. Carpenter, 9th U.S. Infantry, in 1897, the .25-21 was based on the longer .25-25. It was Stevens' second straight-cased cartridge (after the .25-25) and would be used in the single shot Model 44 rifle, as well as the Model 44 1/2, which first went on sale in 1903. In addition, it was available in the Remington-Hepburn target rifle.

While the .25-25 was popular, the .25-21 offered "practically the same performance and was a little cleaner shooting." It was also found the usual 20 or 21 gr (1.30 or 1.36 g) black powder charge of the shorter, bottlenecked .25-21 offered "practically the same ballistics" as 24 or 25 gr (1.56 or 1.62 g) in the .25-25. It was highly accurate, reputedly capable of generating .5 in (12.7 mm) groups at 100 yd (91 m).

In power, the .25-21 was outpaced by the .25-20 Winchester and .32-20 Winchester, while today, even modern pistol rounds such as the .38 Super offer superior performance.

== Sources ==
- Barnes, Frank C., ed. by John T. Amber. ".25-21 Stevens", in Cartridges of the World, pp. 74 & 123. Northfield, IL: DBI Books, 1972. ISBN 0-695-80326-3.
- ______ and _____. ".25-25 Stevens", in Cartridges of the World, p. 75. Northfield, IL: DBI Books, 1972. ISBN 0-695-80326-3.
- ______ and _____. ".25-20 WCF", in Cartridges of the World, p. 20. Northfield, IL: DBI Books, 1972. ISBN 0-695-80326-3.
- ______ and _____. ".32-20 Winchester", in Cartridges of the World, p. 46. Northfield, IL: DBI Books, 1972. ISBN 0-695-80326-3.
- ______ and _____. ".38 Colt Super Automatic", in Cartridges of the World, p. 46. Northfield, IL: DBI Books, 1972. ISBN 0-695-80326-3.
