= List of firearms (M) =

This is a list of small arms whose manufacturer or name (in the case of no known or multiple manufacturers) starts with the letter M—including pistols, shotguns, sniper rifles, submachine guns, personal defense weapons, assault rifles, battle rifles, designated marksman rifles, carbines, machine guns, flamethrowers, multiple-barrel firearms, grenade launchers, anti-tank rifles, and any other variants.

== List ==
- M1 carbine (US – semi-automatic carbine – .30 carbine)
- ACS Hezi SM-1 (US, Israel – semi-automatic carbine – .30 carbine: M1 carbine Variant)
- M1A1 carbine (US – semi-automatic carbine – .30 carbine)
- M1A2 carbine (US – semi-automatic carbine – .30 carbine)
- M1A3 carbine (US – semi-automatic carbine – .30 carbine)
- M2 carbine (US – carbine – .30 carbine)
- M2A2 carbine(US – carbine – .30 carbine)
- M3 carbine (US – semi-automatic carbine – .30 carbine)
- M1 Garand rifle(US – semi-automatic rifle – .30-06 Springfield)
- M1 rifle (US – semi-automatic rifle – .30-06 Springfield/7.62×63mm)
- M1D rifle (US – sniper rifle – .30-06 Springfield)
- M1E1 rifle (US – semi-automatic rifle – .30-06 Springfield)
- M1E2 rifle (US – semi-automatic rifle – .30-06 Springfield)
- M1E3 rifle (US – semi-automatic rifle – .30-06 Springfield)
- M1E4 rifle (US – semi-automatic rifle – .30-06 Springfield)
- M1E9 rifle (US – semi-automatic rifle – .30-06 Springfield)
- M1E5 carbine (US – semi-automatic carbine – .30-06 Springfield)
- M1E6 sniper rifle (US – semi-automatic sniper rifle – .30-06 Springfield)
- M1C sniper rifle (US – semi-automatic sniper rifle – .30-06 Springfield)
- M1D sniper rifle (US – semi-automatic sniper rifle – .30-06 Springfield)
- M1E10 rifle (US – semi-automatic rifle – .30-06 Springfield)
- M1E11 rifle (US – semi-automatic rifle – .30-06 Springfield)
- M1E12 rifle (US – semi-automatic rifle – .30-06 Springfield)
- M1E13 rifle (US – semi-automatic rifle – .30-06 Springfield)
- M1E14 rifle (US semi-automatic rifle 7.62×51mm NATO)
- T1 rifle (US – semi-automatic rifle – .30-06 Springfield: Prototype)
- T1E1 rifle (US – semi-automatic rifle – .30-06 Springfield: Prototype)
- T1E2 rifle (US – semi-automatic rifle – .30-06 Springfield: Prototype)
- T20 automatic rifle(US – battle rifle – .30-06 Springfield)
- T20E1 automatic rifle (US – battle rifle – .30-06 Springfield)
- T20E2 automatic rifle (US – rifle – .30-06 Springfield)
- T20E2HB automatic rifle(US – rifle – .30-06 Springfield)
- T36 automatic rifle (US – battle rifle – 7.62×51mm NATO)
- T37 automatic rifle (US – battle rifle – 7.62×51mm NATO)
- T26 carbine (US – carbine – .30-06 Springfield)
- T31 rifle (US – rifle – .30-06 Springfield: Prototype)
- T35 rifle (US – rifle – 7.62×51mm NATO)
- M14 rifle (US – battle rifle – 7.62×51mm NATO)
- M14 designated marksman rifle (US – semi-automatic designated marksman rifle – 7.62×51mm NATO)
- M14E1(US – battle rifle – 7.62×51mm NATO: Prototype)
- M14A1(US – squad automatic weapon – 7.62×51mm NATO)
- M14E2(US – squad automatic weapon – 7.62×51mm NATO: Prototype)
- M14M(US – semi-automatic battle rifle – 7.62×51mm NATO)
- M14NM(US – semi-automatic battle rifle – 7.62×51mm NATO)
- M14 SMUD (US – semi-automatic battle rifle – 7.62×51mm NATO)
- M15(US – squad automatic weapon – 7.62×51mm NATO)
- M21 sniper rifle(US – semi-automatic sniper rifle – 7.62×51mm NATO)
- M25 sniper rifle(US – semi-automatic sniper rifle – 7.62×51mm NATO)
- M39 EMR(US semi-automatic designated marksman rifle 7.62×51mm NATO)
- Mk 14 Mod 0 (US – designated marksman rifle – 7.62×51mm NATO)
- M14 EBR-RI(US – designated marksman rifle – 7.62×51mm NATO)
- M14 EBR-RI NM (US – designated marksman rifle – 7.62×51mm NATO)
- M14 Tactical (US – designated marksman rifle – 7.62×51mm NATO)
- Mk 14 Mod 0 SEI (US – designated marksman rifle – 7.62×51mm NATO)
- Mk 14 Mod 1 (US – designated marksman rifle – 7.62×51mm NATO)
- Mk 14 Mod 2 (US – designated marksman rifle – 7.62×51mm NATO)
- M24 sniper rifle (US – bolt-action sniper rifle – 7.62×51mm NATO)
- M24A1 (US – bolt-action sniper rifle – 7.62×51mm NATO)
- XM24A1 (US – bolt-action sniper rifle – .300 Winchester Magnum: Prototype)
- M24A2 (US – bolt-action sniper rifle – .300 Winchester Magnum)
- M24A3 (US – bolt-action sniper rifle – .338 Lapua Magnum)
- M2010(US – bolt-action sniper rifle – .300 Winchester Magnum)
- M40 (US – bolt-action sniper rifle – 7.62×51mm NATO)
- M40A1 (US – bolt-action sniper rifle – 7.62×51mm NATO)
- M40A3 (US – bolt-action sniper rifle – 7.62×51mm NATO)
- M40A5 (US – bolt-action sniper rifle – 7.62×51mm NATO)
- M40A6 (US – bolt-action sniper rifle – 7.62×51mm NATO)
- M60 (US – general-purpose machine gun – 7.62×51mm NATO)
- T161 (US – general-purpose machine gun – 7.62×51mm NATO: Prototype)
- M60B (US – general-purpose machine gun – 7.62×51mm NATO)
- M60D (US – vehicle mounted general-purpose machine gun – 7.62×51mm NATO)
- M60C (US – aircraft mounted general-purpose machine gun – 7.62×51mm NATO)
- M60E1 (US – general-purpose machine gun – 7.62×51mm NATO: Prototype)
- M60E2 (US – vehicle mounted general-purpose machine gun – 7.62×51mm NATO)
- M60E3 (US – general-purpose machine gun – 7.62×51mm NATO)
- M60E4 (US – general-purpose machine gun – 7.62×51mm NATO)
- M60E6 (US – general-purpose machine gun – 7.62×51mm NATO)
- M89SR sniper rifle (State of Israel – 1980s – semi-automatic sniper rifle – 7.62×51mm NATO)
- M110 SASS (US – semi-automatic sniper rifle – 7.62×51mm NATO)
- M110 CSASS (US – semi-automatic sniper rifle – 7.62×51mm NATO)
- M202 FLASH (US – multiple-barrel grenade launcher – M235 Incendiary TPA)
- M202A1 Flash (US – multiple-barrel grenade launcher – M235 Incendiary TPA)
- M1014 (Italy – semi-automatic shotgun – 12 gauge)
- MAG-7 (Republic of South Africa – subcompact pump-action shotgun – 12 gauge)
- MAG-7 M1 (Republic of South Africa – pump-action shotgun – 12 gauge)
- Maadi 920 (Egypt – semi-automatic pistol – 9×19mm Parabellum)
- Maadi Griffin (Egypt – single-shot bolt-action anti-materiel rifle – .50 BMG)
- Maadi MISR-10 (Egypt – semi-automatic rifle – 7.62×39mm)
- Magnum Research
- Pistols
- Magnum Research Baby Eagle (US – semi-automatic pistol)
- Magnum Research MR4500RS (US – semi-compact semi-automatic pistol – .45 ACP)
- Magnum Research MR9400 (US – semi-automatic pistol – .40 S&W)
- Magnum Research MR9400BL (US – compact semi-automatic pistol – .40 S&W)
- Magnum Research MR9400RB (US – compact semi-automatic pistol – .40 S&W)
- Magnum Research MR9400RS (US – semi-compact semi-automatic pistol – .40 S&W)
- Magnum Research MR9400RSL (US – semi-compact semi-automatic pistol – .40 S&W)
- Magnum Research MR9900 (US – semi-automatic pistol – 9×19mm Parabellum)
- Magnum Research MR9900BL (US – compact semi-automatic pistol – 9×19mm Parabellum)
- Magnum Research MR9900RB (US – compact semi-automatic pistol – 9×19mm Parabellum)
- Magnum Research MR9900RS (US – semi-compact semi-automatic pistol – 9×19mm Parabellum)
- Magnum Research MR9900RSL (US – semi-compact semi-automatic pistol – 9×19mm Parabellum)
- Magnum Research MR9915R (US – semi-automatic pistol – 9×19mm Parabellum)
- Magnum Research MR9915RS (US – semi-compact semi-automatic pistol – 9×19mm Parabellum)
- Magnum Research MR9915RSL (US – semi-compact semi-automatic pistol – 9×19mm Parabellum)
- Magnum Research Baby Eagle II (US – semi-automatic pistol – 9×19mm Parabellum, .40 S&W, .45 ACP)
- Magnum Research Desert Eagle (US – semi-automatic pistol – Various)
- Magnum Research Desert Eagle Mark I (US – semi-automatic pistol – .357 Magnum, .44 Magnum)
- Magnum Research Desert Eagle Mark VII (US – semi-automatic pistol – .357 Magnum, .41 Magnum, .44 Magnum, .50 AE(Later models))
- Magnum Research Desert Eagle Mark XIX (US – semi-automatic pistol – .357 Magnum, .44 Magnum, .440 Cor-bon, .50 AE)
- Magnum Research Desert Eagle 1911 (US – semi-automatic pistol – .45 ACP: Licensed production Colt M1911)
- Magnum Research Lone Eagle (US – single-shot pistol – .223 Remington, .22–250)
- Magnum Research ME380 (US – semi-automatic pistol – .380 ACP: Licensed Production Kevin ZP98)
- Magnum Research Mountain Eagle Pistol (US – semi-automatic pistol – .22 LR)
- Magnum Research MR Eagle (US – semi-automatic pistol – Various)
- Magnum Research MR9 (US – semi-automatic pistol – 9×19mm Parabellum)
- Magnum Research MR40 (US – semi-automatic pistol – .40 S&W)
- Magnum Research SP-21 (US – semi-automatic pistol – 9×19mm Parabellum, .40 S&W, .45 ACP: Licensed production SP-21 Barak)
- Revolvers
- Magnum Research BFR (US – single-action revolver – Various)
- Magnum Research BFR Long Cylinder (US – single-action revolver – .30-30 Winchester, .375 Winchester, .38–55 Winchester, .444 Marlin, .45 Colt, .45–70 Government, .45–90 Winchester, .450 Marlin, .460 S&W Magnum, .50 Beowulf, .50 JRH, .500 S&W Magnum)
- Magnum Research BFR short cylinder (US – single-action revolver – .22 Hornet, .218 Bee, .44 Remington Magnum, .45 ACP, .45 Winchester Magnum, .454 Casull, .475 Linebaugh, .480 Ruger, .50 Action Express, .50 GI, .50 JRH)
- Rifles
- Magnum Research MagnumLite (US – semi-automatic rifle – .22 Magnum)
- Magnum Research Mountain Eagle Rifle (US – bolt-action rifle – .280 Remington, 7mm Remington Magnum, 7mm Winchester Short Magnum, .30-06, .300 Winchester Magnum, .308 Winchester Magnum)
- Magpul Industries
- submachine guns
- Magpul FMG-9 (US – folding submachine gun – 9×19mm Parabellum: Prototype)
- Magtech Model 7022 (US – semi-automatic carbine – .22 Long Rifle)
- Magtech Doorbuster (US – pump-action shotgun – gauge)
- Mahely carbine (Argentina – semi-automatic carbine .22 Long Rifle)
- Mamba (South Africa – semi-automatic pistol – 9×19mm Parabellum)
- Mambi AMR (Cuba – semi-automatic anti-material rifle – 14.5×114mm)
- Manufacture d'armes de Bayonne
- Pistols
- MAB Model A (France – subcompact semi-automatic pistol – .25 ACP)
- MAB Model B (France – subcompact semi-automatic pistol – .25 ACP)
- MAB Model C/D (France – semi-automatic pistol – .32 ACP, .380 ACP)
- MAB Model C/D Type I (France – semi-automatic pistol – .32 ACP, .380 ACP)
- MAB Model C/D Type II (France – semi-automatic pistol – .32 ACP, .380 ACP)
- MAB Model E (France – semi-automatic pistol – .25 ACP)
- MAB Model G (France – compact semi-automatic pistol – .22 Long Rifle)
- MAB Model R (France – semi-automatic pistol – .32 ACP)
- MAB Model P8 (France – semi-automatic pistol – 9×19mm Parabellum)
- MAB PA-15 (France – semi-automatic pistol – 9×19mm Parabellum)
- MAB PA-15 Target (France – semi-automatic pistol – 9×19mm Parabellum)
- Manufacture d'armes de Châtellerault
- Machine Guns
- MAC 24/29 (France – light machine gun – 7.5×54mm French)
- MAC 24/29D (France – light machine gun – 7.5×54mm French)
- MAC-31 (France – light machine gun – 7.5×54mm French)
- MAC-58 (France – heavy machine gun – .50 BMG: MAS AA-52 Variant)
  - Pistols
- MAC-50 (France – semi-automatic pistol – 9×19mm Parabellum)
- Manufacture d'armes de Saint-Étienne
- Revolvers
- MAS 1873 (France – single-action revolver – 11mm French Ordnance)
- Rifles
- MAS G3 (France – battle rifle – 7.62×51mm NATO: HK G3 Variant)
- MAS HK33 (France – assault rifle – 5.56×45mm NATO: HK33 Variant)
- MAS-36 (France – bolt-action rifle – 7.5×54mm French)
- MAS-36 CR39 (France – bolt-action rifle – 7.5×54mm French)
- MAS-36 FR-G2 (France – bolt-action designated marksman rifle – 7.5×54mm French)
- MAS-36 LG48 (France – bolt-action rifle – 7.5×54mm French)
- MAS-36/51 (France – bolt-action rifle – 7.5×54mm French)
- submachine guns
- MAS-38 (France – submachine gun – 7.65×20mm Longue, .32 ACP)
- MAS-49 (France – semi-automatic rifle – 7.5×54mm French)
- MAS 49/56 (France – semi-automatic rifle – 7.5×54mm French)
- MAS-49/56 MSF (France – semi-automatic rifle – 7.5×54mm French)
- MAS Type 62(France – battle rifle – 7.62×51mm NATO)
- FA56 (France - battle rifle - 7.62×51mm NATO)
- FA59 (France – battle rifle – 7.62×51mm NATO)
- MAS-54 (France – battle rifle – 7.62×51mm NATO)
- MAS-55(France – battle rifle – 7.62×51mm NATO)
- MAS modèle 1935(France – semi-automatic pistol – 7.65×20mm Longue)
- MAS modèle 1935A (France – semi-automatic pistol – 7.65×20mm Longue)
- MAS modèle 1935S (France – semi-automatic pistol – 7.65×20mm Longue)
- MAS modèle 1935S M1 (France – semi-automatic pistol – 7.65×20mm Longue)
- Manufacture d'armes de Tulle
- submachine guns
- MAT-49(France – submachine gun – 9×19mm Parabellum)
- MAS-48 (France – submachine gun – 9×19mm Parabellum: Prototype)
- MAT-49 Silenced (France – integrally suppressed submachine gun – 9×19mm Parabellum)

MAT-49 VPA Converted Variant(France – submachine gun – 7.62×25mm Tokarev)

- MAT-49/54 (France – submachine gun – 9×19mm Parabellum)
- Manufacture d'Armes des Pyrénées Françaises
- Pistols
- DES Pistol(French Republic – unknown date – semi-automatic pistol – .22 Long Rifle)
- DES-69 (French Republic – unknown date – semi-automatic pistol – .22 Long Rifle)
- DES-96 (French Republic – unknown date – semi-automatic pistol – .22 Long Rifle)
- Mikros Pistol(French Republic – unknown date – semi-automatic pistol – .25 ACP)
- Model. Bcf 66 Pistol (French Republic – unknown date – semi-automatic pistol – .32 ACP, .380 ACP)
- Model. C Pistol (French Republic – unknown date – semi-automatic pistol – .32 ACP)
- Model. D Pistol (French Republic – unknown date – semi-automatic pistol – .22 Long Rifle)
- Model. D2 Pistol (French Republic – unknown date – semi-automatic pistol – .22 Long Rifle)
- Model. D3 Pistol (French Republic – unknown date – semi-automatic pistol – .22 Long Rifle)
- Model. D4 Pistol (French Republic – unknown date – semi-automatic pistol – .22 Long Rifle)
- Model. D6 Pistol (French Republic – unknown date – semi-automatic pistol – .22 Long Rifle)
- Model. D8 Pistol (French Republic – unknown date – semi-automatic pistol – .22 Long Rifle)
- Model. L Pistol (French Republic – unknown date – semi-automatic pistol – .22 Long Rifle, .32 ACP, .380 ACP)
- Model. Ld(French Republic – unknown date – semi-automatic pistol – .22 Long Rifle)
- Model. Le(French Republic – unknown date – semi-automatic pistol – .32 ACP)
- Model. Lf(French Republic – unknown date – semi-automatic pistol – .380 ACP)
- Model. R(French Republic – unknown date – semi-automatic pistol – .22 Long Rifle, .32 ACP)
- Model. RD Pistol (French Republic – unknown date – semi-automatic pistol – .22 Long Rifle)
- Model. RR 17(French Republic – unknown date – semi-automatic pistol – .22 Long Rifle, .32 ACP)
- Model. RR 51(French Republic – unknown date – semi-automatic pistol – .32 ACP)
- Model. RR 59(French Republic – unknown date – semi-automatic pistol – .32 ACP)
- Model. RANGER(French Republic – unknown date – semi-automatic pistol – .22 Long Rifle)
- Model. 16(French Republic – unknown date – semi-automatic pistol – .32 ACP)
- Model. 17(French Republic – unknown date semi automatic pistol – .32 ACP)
- Model. 52(French Republic – unknown date – semi-automatic pistol – .22 Long Rifle)
- Manurhin
  - Pistols
- Manurhin P38(Germany, France – semi-automatic pistol – 9×19mm Parabellum: Walther P38 Variant)
- Manurhin P1(France – semi-automatic pistol – 7.65×21mm Parabellum, 9×19mm Parabellum, .22 Long Rifle)
- Manurhin PP (Germany, France – compact semi-automatic pistol – .22 Long Rifle, .25 ACP, .32 ACP, .380 ACP: Walther PP Variant)
- Manurhin PP Sport (France – compact semi-automatic pistol – .22 Long Rifle, .25 ACP, .32 ACP, .380 ACP)
- Manurhin PPK(France – subcompact semi-automatic pistol – .22 Long Rifle, .25 ACP, .32 ACP, .380 ACP)
- Revolvers
- Manurhin MR 73 (France – double-action revolver – 9×19mm Parabellum, .22 Long Rifle, .357 Magnum .38 Special)
- Manurhin MR 32(France – double-action revolver – .32 S&W Long)
- Manurhin MR 73 Gendarmerie (France – double-action revolver – 9×19mm Parabellum, .22 Long Rifle, .357 Magnum .38 Special)
- Manurhin MR 73 Match(France – double-action revolver – 9×19mm Parabellum, .22 Long Rifle, .357 Magnum .38 Special)
- Manurhin MR 73 Sport (France – double-action revolver – 9×19mm Parabellum, .22 Long Rifle, .357 Magnum .38 Special)
- Manurhin MR 88(France – double-action revolver – 9×19mm Parabellum, .22 Long Rifle, .357 Magnum .38 Special)
- Manurhin Spécial Police F1 (France – double-action revolver – 9×19mm Parabellum, .22 Long Rifle, .357 Magnum .38 Special)
- Manurhin MR 93(France – double-action revolver – 9×19mm Parabellum, .22 Long Rifle, .357 Magnum .38 Special)
- Manurhin MR 96(France – double-action revolver – 9×19mm Parabellum, .22 Long Rifle, .357 Magnum .38 Special)
- Rifles
- Manurhin SG 540(Switzerland, France – assault rifle – 5.56×45mm NATO: Licensed Production SIG SG 540)
- Manurhin SG 541(France – assault rifle – 5.56×45mm NATO)
- Manurhin SG 542 (France – battle rifle – 7.62×51mm NATO)
- Manurhin SG 543(France – carbine – 5.56×45mm NATO)
- SIG Manurhin C.S.A.(France – semi-automatic rifle – .243 Winchester)
- SIG Manurhin F.S.A.(France – semi-automatic rifle – .222 Remington)
- Manville gun
- Marek 3J (UK – submachine gun – .45 ACP)
- Marek Type S (UK – submachine gun – .45 ACP: single-barrel variant)
- Marek Type D (UK – submachine gun – .45 ACP: double-barrel variant)
- Marek Type T (UK – submachine gun – .45 ACP: triple-barrel variant)
- Marlin Firearms
- Rifles
- Marlin 25N (US – bolt-action rifle – .22 Long Rifle)
- Marlin Camp carbine (US – semi-automatic carbine – 9×19mm Parabellum, .45 ACP)
- Marlin Model 336 Most commonly chambered in .30-30 Winchester or .35 Remington
- Variations of the Model 336 Lever Action design chambered in other calibers by model number & discontinued calibers.
- Model 1895 Chambering/Caliber options .45-70, .444 Marlin, or .450 Marlin
- Marlin Model 1894 Chamberings: .38 Special/.357 Magnum, .44 Special/.44 Magnum, or .45 Colt
- Calibers no longer offered for sale as new .219 Zipper, .32 special, .356 Winchester, .375 Winchester, .38-55 Winchester, .410 bore
- Marlin Model 60 (US – semi-automatic rifle – .22 Long Rifle)
- Marlin Model 60C (US – semi-automatic rifle – .22 Long Rifle)
- Marlin Model 60DL(US – semi-automatic rifle – .22 Long Rifle)
- Marlin Model 60DLX(US – semi-automatic rifle – .22 Long Rifle)
- Marlin Model 60G (US – semi-automatic rifle – .22 Long Rifle)
- Marlin Model 60S-CF(US – semi-automatic rifle – .22 Long Rifle)
- Marlin Model 60SB(US – semi-automatic rifle – .22 Long Rifle)
- Marlin Model 60SN(US – semi-automatic rifle – .22 Long Rifle)
- Marlin Model 60SS(US – semi-automatic rifle – .22 Long Rifle)
- Marlin Model 60SSBL (US – semi-automatic rifle – .22 Long Rifle)
- Marlin Model 60SSK(US – semi-automatic rifle – .22 Long Rifle)
- Marlin Model 99 (US – semi-automatic rifle – .22 Long Rifle)
- Marlin Model 99DL(US – semi-automatic rifle – .22 Long Rifle)
- Marlin Model 99G (US – semi-automatic rifle – .22 Long Rifle)
- Marlin Model 99M1(US – semi-automatic carbine – .22 Long Rifle)
- Marlin Model 989M2(US – semi-automatic rifle – .22 Long Rifle)
- Marlin Model 120 (US – semi-automatic rifle – .22 Long Rifle)
- Marlin Model 600 (US – semi-automatic rifle – .22 Long Rifle)
- Marlin Model 1895G (US – Lever-Action Rifle – .45–70 Government)
  - Shotguns
- Marlin Model 43(US – pump-action shotgun – 12 gauge)
- MASAF (Iran – assault rifle – 5.56×45mm NATO)
- Mateba Autorevolver (Italy – semi-automatic Revolver – Various)
- Mateba AutoRevolver 6-Defence (Italy – semi-automatic Revolver – .357 Magnum)
- Mateba AutoRevolver 6-Dynamic Sportiva (Italy – semi-automatic Revolver – .357 Magnum)
- Mateba AutoRevolver 6-Home Protection(Italy – semi-automatic Revolver – .44 Remignton Magnum)
- Mateba AutoRevolver 6-Hunter (Italy – semi-automatic Revolver – .357 Magnum, .38 Special, .44 Remington Magnum, .44 S&W Special)
- Mateba Grifone (Italy – semi-automatic Revolver – .357 Magnum, .44 Remington Magnum, .45 Colt, .454 Casull)
- Mauser
- Machine Guns
- Mauser EW-141 (Nazi Germany – Vehicle-Mounted Machine Gun – 7.92×57mm)
- Pistols
- Mauser HSc (Germany – Compact semi-automatic pistol – .32ACP, .380 ACP)
- HSc Super (German – Compact semi-automatic pistol – .32ACP, .380 ACP)
- Mauser M1910 (German Empire – Subcompact semi-automatic pistol – .25 ACP)
- Mauser C96 (German Empire – semi-automatic pistol – 7.63×25mm Mauser)
- Mauser M30 Luftwaffe Pistol (Nazi Germany – semi-automatic pistol – 7.63×25mm Mauser)
- Mauser M1896 Compact(German Empire – Compact semi-automatic pistol – 7.63×25mm Mauser)
- Mauser M1896 Kavallerie Karabiner (German Empire – semi-automatic carbine – 7.63×25mm Mauser)
- Mauser M1896 Officer's Model(German Empire – semi-automatic pistol – 7.63×25mm Mauser)
- Mauser M1897 Turkish Army (German Empire – semi-automatic pistol – 7.63×25mm Mauser)
- Mauser M1898 Pistol carbine(German Empire – semi-automatic carbine – 7.63×25mm Mauser)
- Mauser M1899 Italian Navy (German Empire – semi-automatic pistol – 7.63×25mm Mauser)
- Mauser M1910 Persian Contract (German Empire – semi-automatic pistol – 7.63×25mm Mauser)
- Mauser M1912 Export Model(German Empire – semi-automatic pistol – 9×25mm Mauser)
- Mauser M1916 Austrian Contract (German Empire – semi-automatic pistol – 7.63×25mm Mauser)
- Mauser M1916 Prussian Red 9(German Empire – semi-automatic pistol – 9×19mm Parabellum)
- M1920 Mauser Rework(Weimar Republic – semi-automatic pistol – 7.63×25mm Mauser, 7.65×21mm Parabellum)
- Mauser M1920 French Police Contract (Weimar Republic – semi-automatic pistol – 7.63×25mm Mauser)
- Mauser M1921 Bolo(Weimar Republic – semi-automatic pistol – 7.63×25mm Mauser)
- Mauser M1921 Bolo 8.15mm Variant (Weimar Republic – semi-automatic pistol – 8.15×25.2mm Mauser: Prototype)
- Mauser M1932 (Weimar Republic – Machine Pistol – 7.63×25mm Mauser, 9×19mm Parabellum)
- Mauser P04 Naval Luger (German Empire – semi-automatic pistol – 9×19mm Parabellum: P04 Luger Variant)
- Mauser WTP2 (Weimar Republic – Subcompact semi-automatic pistol – .25 ACP)
- Rifles
- Mauser Gewehr 98(German Empire – bolt-action rifle – 7.92×57mm Mauser, 8×57mm IS)
- Mauser Karabiner 98a(German Empire – bolt-action carbine – 7.92×57mm Mauser, 8×57mm IS)
- Mauser Karabiner 98b(German Empire – bolt-action carbine – 7.92×57mm Mauser, 8×57mm IS)
- Mauser Karabiner 98k (Nazi Germany – bolt-action carbine – 7.92×57mm Mauser, 8×57mm IS)
- Mauser G40k (Nazi Germany – bolt-action carbine – 7.92×57mm Mauser, 8×57mm IS)
- Mauser Karabiner 98k Kriegsmodell (Nazi Germany – bolt-action carbine – 7.92×57mm Mauser, 8×57mm IS)
- Mauser Karabiner 98k Paratrooper Variant(Nazi Germany – bolt-action carbine – 7.92×57mm Mauser, 8×57mm IS: Prototype)
- Mauser Karabiner 98k Sniper Conversion(Nazi Germany – bolt-action carbine – 7.92×57mm Mauser, 8×57mm IS)
- Mauser Gewehr 98 Sniper Conversion (German Empire – bolt-action sniper rifle – 7.92×57mm Mauser, 8×57mm IS)
- Mannlicher-Schönauer (Austria – 1903 – rotary magazine bolt action rifle – 6.5 mm × 54 Mannlicher-Schönauer)
- Mannlicher M1885 (Austria – 1885 – semi-auto rifle – 11×58mm, 8×52mm)
- Mannlicher M1893 auto rifle (Austria – 1893 – auto rifle – 6.5×53mm, 8×50mm Mannlicher, .22 long rifle)
- Mauser M 98(Germany – bolt-action carbine – 7.92×57mm Mauser, 8×57mm IS, Many other commercial cartridges)
- Mauser M 98 Magnum(Germany – bolt-action carbine – .338 Lapua Magnum, .375 Holland & Holland, .416 Rigby, .450 Dakota, .458 Lott, .500 Jeffery)
- Mauser Model 1889 (German Empire – bolt-action rifle – 7.65×53mm Argentine)
- submachine guns
- Mauser MP-57(West Germany – submachine gun – 9×19mm Parabellum)
- Maxim MG 08(German Empire Heavy Machine Gun – 8×57mm IS)
- Maxim IMG 08 (German Empire – Aircraft-Mounted Heavy Machine Gun – 8×57mm IS)
- Maxim MG 08/15 (German Empire – Medium Machine Gun 8×57mm IS)
- Maxim MG 08/18 (German Empire Medium Machine Gun 8×57mm IS)
- Maxim MG 18 TuF (German Empire – Anti-Aircraft Gun – 13.2×92mmSR)
- Maxim 1910(Russian Empire Heavy Machine Gun 7.62×54mmR)
- Maxim PM 1910 Kolesnikov Mount (Russian Empire – Heavy Machine Gun – 7.62×54mmR)
- Maxim PM 1910 Sokolov Mount (Russian Empire – Heavy Machine Gun – 7.62×54mmR)
- Maxim PM 1910/30(Soviet Union – Heavy Machine Gun – 7.62×54mmR)
- Maxim PM 1910/30 Vladimirov Mount (Soviet Union – Heavy Machine Gun – 7.62×54mmR)
- Maxim-Tokarev light machine gun (Soviet Union – light machine gun – 7.62×54mmR)
- PV-1 Heavy Machine Gun (Soviet Union – Heavy Machine Gun – 7.62×54mmR)
- ZPU-4 (Soviet Union – Anti-Aircraft Gun – 7.62×54mmR)
- Maxim M/09-21(Russian Empire, Finland – Heavy Machine Gun 7.62×54mmR)
- Maxim M/32-33(Russian Empire, Finland – Heavy Machine Gun – 7.62×53mmR)
- Maxim M/32-33 Tripod Variant(Russian Empire, Finland – Heavy Machine Gun – 7.62×53mmR)
- Maxim wz. 1910/28(Russian Empire, Poland – Heavy Machine Gun – 7.62×54mmR)
- MC255(US – Revolving Shotgun)
- MC255-12(US – Revolving Shotgun – 12 gauge)
- MC255-20(US – Revolving Shotgun – 20 gauge)
- McMillan Firearms Manufacturing LLC
- Rifles
- McMillan M87(US – Bolt-Action Anti-Materiel Rifle – .50 BMG)
- McMillan M87R(US – Bolt-Action Anti-Materiel Rifle – .50 BMG)
- McMillan M88(US – Bolt-Action Anti-Materiel Rifle – .50 BMG)
- Tac-50 (US – Bolt-Action Anti-Materiel Rifle – .50 BMG)
- Tac-50 A1 (US – Bolt-Action Anti-Materiel Rifle – .50 BMG)
- Tac-50 A1-R2(US – Bolt-Action Anti-Materiel Rifle – .50 BMG)
- Tubb-2000 (US – semi-automatic rifle – 6mm BR, 6mm XC, 7mm-08 Remington, .22–250 Remington, .308 Winchester)
- Tubb-2000 Spec-Tac-LR(US – semi-automatic rifle – 6mm BR, 6mm XC, 7mm-08 Remington, .22–250 Remington, .308 Winchester)
- Tubb-2000c (US – semi-automatic rifle – 6mm BR, 6mm XC, 7mm-08 Remington, .22–250 Remington, .308 Winchester)
- Tubb-2000t (US – semi-automatic rifle – 6mm BR, 6mm XC, 7mm-08 Remington, .22–250 Remington, .308 Winchester)
- McCrudden light machine rifle
- Mechanical and Chemical Industry Corporation
- Launchers
- GL-40(Republic of Turkey/US – unknown date – single-shot underslung grenade launcher – 40×46mm Grenade: Turkish variant of the American M203 grenade launcher.)
- T-40 (Grenade Launcher) (Republic of Turkey/US – Mechanical and Chemical Industry Corporation/AAI Corporation – unknown date – single-shot underslung grenade launcher – 40×46mm Grenade: Turkish variant of the M203 grenade launcher.)
- Machine Guns
- MKEK MG-3(Turkey – general-purpose machine gun – 7.62×51mm NATO)
- Rifles
- MKEK G3A7(Turkey – battle rifle – 7.62×51mm NATO: G3A3 Variant)
- MKEK G3A7A1 (Turkey – battle rifle – 7.62×51mm NATO: G3A4 Variant)
- MKEK MPT(Turkey – Rifle)
- MKEK MPT-56 (Turkey – assault rifle – 5.56×45mm NATO)
- MKEK MPT-76 (Turkey – battle rifle – 7.62×51mm NATO)
- MKEK OPT-556 (Turkey – assault rifle – 5.56×45mm NATO)
- submachine guns
- MKEK SMP5(Turkey, Germany – submachine gun – 9×19mm Parabellum: HK MP5 Variant)
- MKEK SMP5-K(Turkey, Germany – Compact submachine gun – 9×19mm Parabellum: HK MP5-K Variant)
- Mekanika
  - Machine Guns
- Uirapuru (Federative Republic of Brazil – unknown date – general-purpose machine gun – 7.62×51mm NATO)
- submachine guns
- Uru submachine gun (Brazil – submachine gun – 9×19mm Parabellum, .38 ACP)
- MEMS M-52/60 (Argentina – submachine gun – 9×19mm Parabellum)
- MEMS M-67 (Argentina – submachine gun – 9×19mm Parabellum)
- Mendoza
- Machine Guns
- Mendoza RM2 (Mexico – light machine gun – 7.92×57mm Mauser, .30-06)
- submachine guns
- Mendoza HM-3 (Mexico – submachine gun – 9×19mm Parabellum, .380 ACP)
- Mendoza HM-3S (Mexico – submachine gun – 9×19mm Parabellum, .380 ACP)
- Meriden Pocket Pistol (France – Break-Action Revolver – .32 S&W, .38 S&W)
- Mershon and Hollingsworth M1855(US automatic rifle)
- Métral submachine gun (France – submachine gun – 9×19mm Parabellum)
- MG 14 (German Empire – general purpose machine gun 8×57mm IS)
- MG 14/17 (German Empire – general-purpose machine gun 8×57mm IS)
- MG 14z (German Empire – general-purpose machine gun 8×57mm IS)
- MGV 176 .22 (Slovenia – submachine gun – .22 Long Rifle)
- Micro Anthis (France – integrally suppressed Compact assault rifle – 5.56×45mm NATO)
- Milcam 5.56 mm rifle(UK – bolt-action rifle – 5.56×45mm NATO)
- Milcam HB 5.56 mm rifle (UK – bolt-action rifle – 5.56×45mm NATO)
- Military Police Systems, Inc.
- Shotguns
- AA-12(US – Maxwell Atchisson, Military Police Systems, Inc. – 1972 (Original Variant), 1987–2005 (Military Police Systems, Inc.) – Fully Automatic Combat Shotgun – 12 gauge: Originally designed by Maxwell Atchisson, who sold the rights of the weapon to Military Police Systems, Inc. in 1987. Presented to the United States Marine Corps in 2004, but was never adopted.)
- AA-12 CQB(US – Military Police Systems, Inc. – unknown date – Compact Fully Automatic Combat Shotgun – 12 gauge: Compact variant of the AA-12 with a shorter 13" barrel. Half a pound lighter than the original AA-12.)
- Milkor
- Launchers
- Milkor UBGL (South Africa – Underslung Grenade Launcher – 40mm)
- Milkor US-Mk 4 (South Africa – Underslung Grenade Launcher – 40mm)
- Milkor US-Mk 4S (South Africa – Underslung Grenade Launcher – 40mm)
- Milkor MGL (South Africa – Grenade Launcher – 40×46mm SR Grenade)
- Milkor MGL Mk 1 (South Africa – Grenade Launcher – 40×46mm SR Grenade)
- Milkor MGL Mk 1L (South Africa – Grenade Launcher – 40×46mm SR Grenade)
- Milkor MGL Mk 1S (South Africa – Grenade Launcher – 40×46mm SR Grenade)
- Milkor MGL Mk 14 Mod 0 (South Africa – Grenade Launcher – 40×46mm SR Grenade)
- Milkor Super Six MRGL (South Africa – Grenade Launcher – 40×51mm Grenade)
- Milkor Stopper (South Africa – single-shot grenade launcher)
- Milkor Stopper 37/38mm (South Africa – single-shot grenade launcher – 37/38mm)
- Milkor Stopper 40mm (South Africa – single-shot grenade launcher – 40mm)
- Milkor Stopper Convertible (South Africa – single-shot grenade launcher – 37/38mm, 40mm)
- submachine guns
- Milkor BXP (South Africa – submachine gun – 9×19mm Parabellum)
- Milkor BXP Tressitu (South Africa – submachine gun – 9×19mm Parabellum)
- Minebea
- submachine guns
- Minebea PM-9 (Japan – Machine Pistol – 9×19mm Parabellum)
- Ministry of Defence Industry of Azerbaijan
  - Rifles
- Istiglal (Azerbaijan – semi-automatic anti-material rifle 14.5×114mm)
- Mubariz (Azerbaijan – semi-automatic anti-material rifle – 12.7×108mm)
- Minuteman submachine gun (US – submachine gun – .45 ACP)
- Mitchell submachine gun (New Zealand – submachine gun – 9×19mm Parabellum: Prototype)
- Mk 12 Mod 0 (US – semi-automatic designated marksman rifle – 5.56×45mm NATO)
- Mk 12 Mod 1 (US – semi-automatic designated marksman rifle – 5.56×45mm NATO)
- Mk 13 Mod 0 (US – bolt-action rifle – .300 Winchester Magnum)
- Mk 13 Mod 1 (US – bolt-action rifle – .300 Winchester Magnum)
- Mk 13 Mod 2 (US – bolt-action rifle – .300 Winchester Magnum)
- Mk 13 Mod 3 (US – bolt-action rifle – .300 Winchester Magnum)
- Mk 13 Mod 4 (US – bolt-action rifle – .300 Winchester Magnum)
- Mk 13 Mod 5 (US – bolt-action rifle – .300 Winchester Magnum)
- Mk 15 Mod 0 (US – Bolt Action Anti-Materiel Rifle – .50 BMG: McMillian M88 PIP Variant)
- Mk 18 Mod 0 Grenade Launcher (US – grenade machine gun – 40×46mm SR Grenade)
- Mk 19 Mod 0 (US – grenade machine gun – 40×53mm Grenade)
- Mk 19 Mod 1 (US – grenade machine gun – 40×53mm Grenade)
- Mk 19 Mod 2(US – grenade machine gun – 40×53mm Grenade)
- Mk 19 Mod 3(US – grenade machine gun – 40×53mm Grenade)
- Mk 19A(US – grenade machine gun – 40×53mm Grenade)
- Mk 20 Mod 0 (US – grenade machine gun – 40×46mm SR Grenade)
- Mk 23 Mod 0 (US – light machine gun – 5.56×45mm NATO: Stoner 63A1 Commando Variant)
- Mk 23 Mod 0 (Germany – semi-automatic pistol – .45 ACP: HK Mark 23 Variant)
- Mk 24 Mod 0 (Switzerland, Germany – semi-automatic pistol – 9×19mm Parabellum: SIG Sauer P226 Variant)
- Mk 24 Mod 0 (US – submachine gun – 9×19mm Parabellum: S&W Model 76 Variant)
- Mk 43 Mod 0(US – light machine gun – 7.62×51mm NATO: M60E4 Variant)
- Mk 46 Mod 0(US – light machine gun – 5.56×45mm NATO: M249 Variant)
- Mk 48 Mod 0(US – light machine gun – 7.62×51mm NATO)
- Mod. 1918 S.I.A. light machine gun (Italy – light machine gun – 6.5×52mm: Browning M1918 BAR Variant)
- Model 45A(US, Philippines – battle rifle – .30-06)
- Model T Machine Gun(US – light machine gun – .22 Long Rifle: Prototype)
- Morgan Arms
- Morgan Arms SMG (US – submachine gun – 9×19mm Parabellum)
- MORS submachine gun (Poland – submachine gun – 9×19mm Parabellum)
- Mosin–Nagant (Russian Empire – bolt-action rifle – 7.62×54mmR)
- Dragoon Rifle (Soviet Union – bolt-action rifle – 7.62×54mmR)
- Cossack Rifle (Soviet Union – bolt-action rifle – 7.62×54mmR)
- Mosin–Nagant M/28 (Russian Empire, Finland – bolt-action rifle – 7.62×54mmR)
- Mosin–Nagant M/28-30 (Finland – bolt-action rifle – 7.62×54mmR)
- Mosin–Nagant M38 (Soviet Union – bolt-action carbine – 7.62×54mmR)
- Mosin–Nagant M44 (Soviet Union – bolt-action carbine – 7.62×54mmR)
- Mosin–Nagant M91/58 (Soviet Union – bolt-action carbine – 7.62×54mmR)
- Mosin–Nagant M91 (Russian Empire – bolt-action rifle – 7.62×54mmR)
- Mosin–Nagant M91/30 (Soviet Union – bolt-action rifle – 7.62×54mmR)
- Mosin–Nagant M1907 carbine (Russian Empire – bolt-action carbine – 7.62×54mmR)
- Mosin–Nagant M1916 (Russian Empire, US bolt-action rifle 7.62×54mmR)
- Obrez (Russian Empire – sawed-off bolt-action rifle 7.62×54mmR)
- OTs-48 (Russian Federation - bolt-action sniper rifle 7.62×54mmR)
- OTs-48K (Russian Federation – shortened bolt-action sniper rifle – 7.62×54mmR)
- Mossberg
  - Rifles
- Mossberg 100ATR (US – bolt-action rifle – 7mm-08 Remington, .243 Winchester, .270 Winchester, .30-06 Springfield, .308 Winchester)
- Mossberg 4X4 (US – bolt-action rifle – various)
- Mossberg 100ATR Night Train (US – bolt-action rifle – .308 Winchester)
- Mossberg MVP 7.62mm Variant (US – bolt-action rifle – 7.62×51mm NATO)
- Mossberg MVP Heavy Barrel (US – bolt-action rifle – 5.56×45mm NATO)
- Mossberg MVP Sporter (US – bolt-action rifle – 5.56×45mm NATO)
- Mossberg MVP Varmint (US – bolt-action rifle – 5.56×45mm NATO)
- Mossberg Model M44US (US – semi-automatic rifle – .22 Long Rifle)
- Mossberg 702 Plinkster (US – semi-automatic rifle – .22 Long Rifle)
- Shotguns
- Mossberg 500(US – pump-action shotgun – 12 gauge)
- Mossberg 500 Field (US – pump-action shotgun – 12 gauge)
- Mossberg 500 Home Security (US – pump-action shotgun – 12 gauge)
- Mossberg 500 Law Enforcement (US – pump-action shotgun – 12 gauge)
- Mossberg 500 Special Purpose (US – pump-action shotgun – 12 gauge)
- Mossberg 500A (US – pump-action shotgun – 12 gauge)
- Mossberg 500B (US – pump-action shotgun – 16 gauge)
- Mossberg 500C (US – pump-action shotgun – 20 gauge)
- Mossberg 500D (US – pump-action shotgun – 28 gauge: Prototype)
- Mossberg 500E (US – pump-action shotgun – .410 Bore)
- Mossberg 505 (US – pump-action shotgun – .410 Bore, 20 gauge)
- Mossberg 535 (US – pump-action shotgun – 12 gauge)
- Mossberg 535ATS (US – pump-action shotgun – 12 gauge)
- Mossberg 590 (US – pump-action shotgun – 12 gauge)
- Mossberg 590 Compact Cruiser (US – pump-action shotgun – 12 gauge)
- Mossberg 590 Compact Mariner (US – pump-action shotgun – 12 gauge)
- Mossberg Bantam (US – pump-action shotgun – 12 gauge)
- Mossberg Super Bantam (US – pump-action shotgun – 12 gauge)
- Mossberg 835 (US – pump-action shotgun – 12 gauge)
- Mossberg 930 (US – semi-automatic shotgun – 12 gauge)
- Mossberg 930 SPX (US – semi-automatic shotgun – 12 gauge)
- Mossberg Maverick 88 (US – pump-action shotgun – 12 gauge)
- Mossberg Trophy Slugster 500 (US – pump-action shotgun – 12 gauge)
- MP 35 (Nazi Germany – submachine gun – 9×19mm Parabellum)
- MPA submachine gun (Argentina – submachine gun – 9×19mm Parabellum)
- MSSR (Philippines – semi-automatic sniper rifle – 5.56×45mm NATO)
- MSSR NFWS (Philippines – integrally suppressed semi-automatic sniper rifle – 5.56×45mm NATO)
- Muharram machine gun (Iran – Gatling machine gun – .50 BMG)
- Mukden Arsenal Type II (China – submachine gun – .45 ACP)
- Murata rifle (Japan – bolt-action rifle – 11×60mmR Murata)
- MZ14 (US – assault rifle – 5.56×45mm NATO)

Firearms are cited from: https://modern-firearms-fo4.info/informations/full-weapon-list/

== See also ==
- List of firearms by era
  - List of pre-20th century firearms
  - List of World War II firearms
- List of firearms by country
  - List of modern Russian small arms
- Lists of firearms by actions
  - List of blow-forward firearms
  - List of delayed-blowback firearms
- List of firearms by type
  - List of assault rifles
  - List of battle rifles
  - List of carbines
  - List of firearm brands
  - List of flamethrowers
  - List of machine guns
  - List of multiple-barrel firearms
  - List of pistols
  - List of shotguns
  - List of sniper rifles
  - List of submachine guns
- List of firearm cartridges
  - List of handgun cartridges
  - List of rifle cartridges
- List of semi-automatic firearms
  - List of semi-automatic pistols
  - List of semi-automatic rifles
  - List of semi-automatic shotguns
  - List of most-produced firearms
