= Ruger American Rifle =

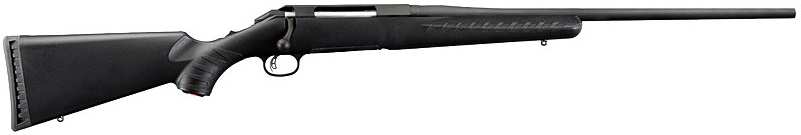
- Ruger American Rifle
- Type: Bolt-action rifle
- Place of origin: United States

Production history
- Designed: 2011
- Manufacturer: Sturm, Ruger & Co.
- Unit cost: $449 MSRP
- Produced: 2012–Present

Specifications
- Mass: 6.25 lb (2.83 kg)
- Length: 42.5 in (108 cm)
- Barrel length: 22 in (56 cm)
- Cartridge: .204 Ruger (Predator model only).223 Remington (5 rd. cap.); 5.56mm NATO (Ranch\Predator models only).22-250 Remington.243 Winchester.270 Winchester; 7mm-08 Remington.30-06 Springfield.308 Winchester.300 Blackout (Ranch model only); 7.62 Soviet (Ranch model only); 6mm Creedmoor (Predator model only); 6.5mm Grendel (Predator model only); 6.5mm Creedmoor.450 Bushmaster (Ranch model only); 7mm Remington Magnum.300 Winchester Magnum.338 Winchester Magnum
- Feed system: Rotary magazine 4 round capacity (unless otherwise noted above)
- Sights: None – Drilled and tapped for scope. (Weaver style bases supplied); Redfield Revolution riflescope available for all centerfire models

The Ruger American Rifle is a family of budget-level hunting/sporting bolt-action centerfire rifle made by Sturm, Ruger & Co., which also produces a line of rimfire rifles with similar designs called the Ruger American Rimfire.

== Design ==
The Ruger American Rifle has a receiver made from 4140 chrome-moly bar stock and a hammer-forged, free-floated barrel with a blued black oxide finish, mounted onto a polymer composite stock. Some models are also available in a stainless steel variant. The rifle feeds cartridges into the chamber from a detachable rotary magazine via a push feed mechanism employing dual cocking cams on the stainless steel bolt, which has three locking lugs allowing for a smaller 70° throw-angle of the bolt handle. Some models have stock variants that accept STANAG- or AICS-style box magazines.

Rather than using a traditional flat lug to transmit recoil, the rifle's barrelled action is secured into the stock via a proprietary bedding system known as "Power Bedding®". The design uses two steel action blocks each with a pair of V-shaped recoil lugs that fit onto reciprocal slots on the barrel base, which wedge the receiver firmly in place to prevent lateral shifts when screwed tight. Because the front and back action screws are fastened through the centers of the action blocks, the blocks also function as pillar beddings that negate potential compressive deformations that can happen to wooden and polymer stocks due to temperature change or moisture.

The Ruger American Rifle is the first to use the trademarked "Ruger Marksman Adjustable™" trigger, which is similar in design to the Savage "AccuTrigger" and allows the user to adjust the weight of pull between 3–5 lb (1.4–2.3 kg) by means of turning a set screw on the trigger housing. The trigger mechanism itself is actually single-stage, but an integrated safety blade (similar to those on Glock pistols) has to be fully depressed first before the main trigger can be unlocked and pulled, thus preventing accidental discharges, and the spring tension of the safety blade functionally creates a "pre-travel" feel that mimic a two-stage trigger, allowing the shooter to exercise a much smoother and comfortable trigger pull. The rifle also comes with a separate tang-mounted safety.

== Models ==
=== Generation I ===
- Standard: 22 in (560 mm) alloy steel sporter barrel, with an overall length of 42 in (1,100 mm) for short-action or 42.5 inches (1,080 mm) for long-action cartridges.
- Compact: 18 in (460 mm) alloy steel sporter barrel, shorter length of pull than the standard model, with an overall length of 36.75 in (933 mm), and chambered for short-action cartridges only.
- Magnum: the long-action models for magnum cartridges (currently the .300 WM and .338 WM), with a 24 in (610 mm) threaded stainless steel barrel and an overall length of 44.5 in (1,130 mm), and comes with factory Weaver rail installed.
- Predator: varmint/target model with an 18 in (.308 Win only) or 22 in (560 mm) threaded alloy steel (stainless option available for 6.5 Creedmoor) Medium Palma barrel, with an overall length of 38 in (970 mm) or 42 in (1,100 mm), and comes with factory Weaver rail installed. STANAG magazines are found on the Predator versions with model numbers 26922 (6.5 mm Grendel) and 26944 (.223 Rem). AICS style magazines are found on the Predator versions with model numbers # 26948 (6 mm Creedmoor), # 26971 (.204 Ruger), 26972 (.243 Win), # 26973 (6.5 mm Creedmoor), # 26974 (.308 Win) and # 36902 (.350 Legend).
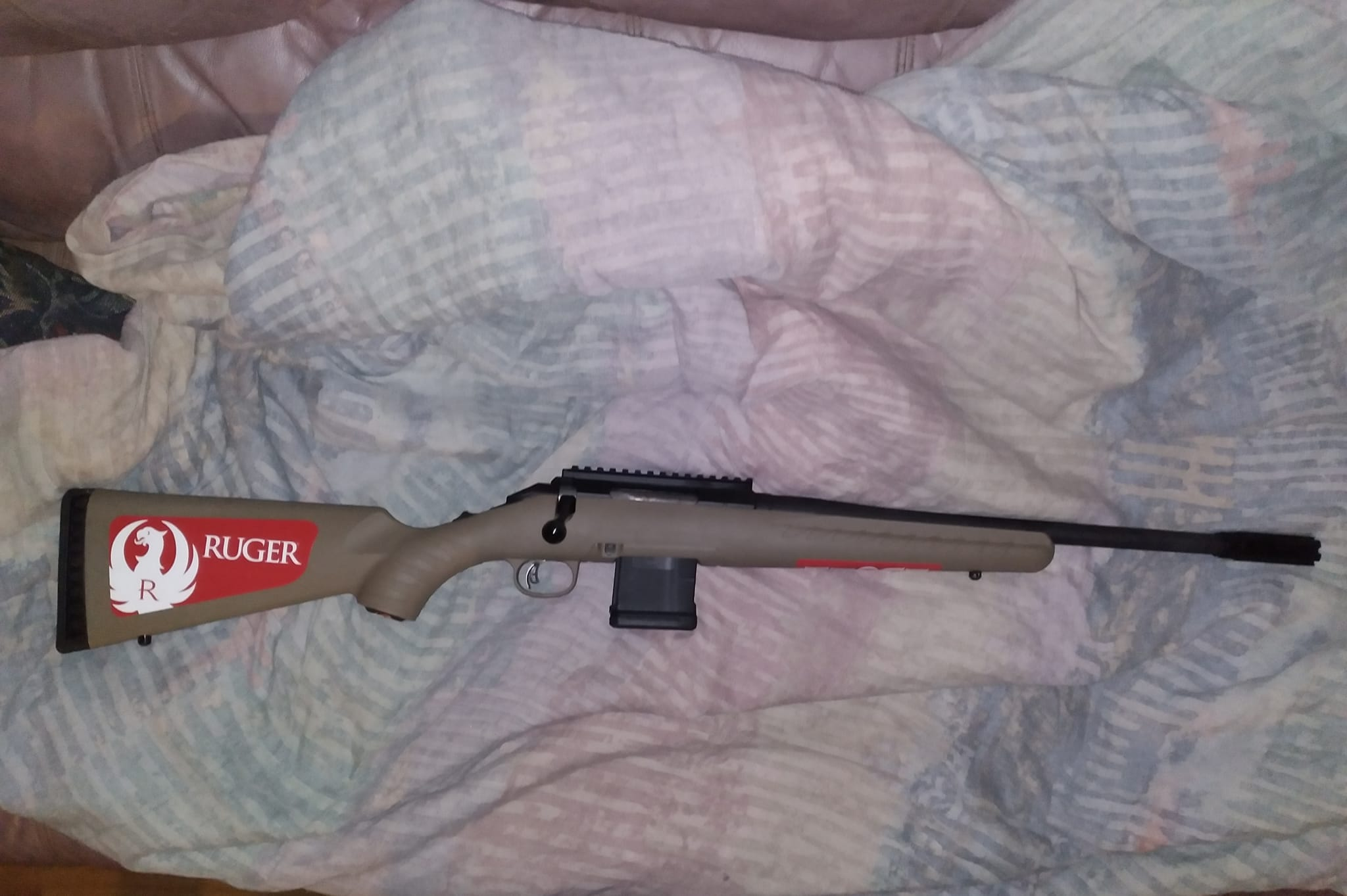
- Ruger American Ranch version in 5.56 Nato with sound forwarder at the muzzle.
  Ranch: short-barrel carbine version of the Predator model with a 16.12 in (409 mm) threaded alloy steel Medium Palma barrel, with an overall length of 36 in (910 mm), chambered for 5.56 NATO/.223 Rem (Model # 6965), .300 Blackout (# 6968), .450 Bushmaster (# 16950 and # 16978), .350 Legend and 7.62 Soviet cartridges (# 16976), and comes with factory Weaver or Picatinny rail installed. In early 2018, Ruger introduced variant models for the 5.56 NATO/.223 Rem (# 26965) and .300 Blackout (# 26968) that accept STANAG magazines.
- Hunter: a heavy barrel version bedded into the Magpul "Hunter American" stock using AICS-pattern PMAG® 7.62 AC box magazines, with a 20 inches (510 mm) threaded alloy steel barrel factory-equipped with a muzzle brake, chambered for 6.5mm Creedmoor and .308 Win.
- Go Wild: This version offers a threaded barrel protected with a bronze colored cerakote finish screwed to a camo pattern stock. The rifle is offered in a series of cartridge options ranging from straight walled such as the 350 legend and the 450 Bushmaster up bottle necked cartridges such as the .243 Winchester, 25-06 Remington, 6.5 PRC, 7mm PRC and 300 Winchester Magnum.

=== Generation II ===
Introduced on Christmas Eve, 2023, Ruger's 2nd Generation Ruger American Rifles feature a fluted barrel with a Cerakote finish and 5/8"-24 (Standard, Predator, Scout, Prairie, and Patrol) or 1/2"-28 (Ranch) barrel threading for muzzle devices, an ergonomic stock allowing the shooter to easily adjust the stock's height and length, and a replaceable bolt handle. While still maintaining the shotgun-style tang safety, this is now a three-position. As of December 2025, Ruger has 6 variations of the Generation II:

- Standard: 20 inches (510 mm) alloy steel sporter barrel, with an overall length of 41.25 in (1073.15 mm) for both long and short-action cartridges. Offered in the same calibers as the Generation I American Standard.
- Ranch: 16.12 inches (409 mm) barrel carbine version of the Standard models. It is available in the same calibers as the Generation I American Ranch.
- Predator: 22 inches (560 mm) alloy steel sporter barrel with a burnt bronze cerakote finish and green stock, with an overall length of 43.25 inches (1,099 mm) for both long and short-action cartridges. Includes a factory installed muzzle break. Offered in 6.5 Creedmoor, 7mm-08 Rem, 243 Win, 204 Ruger, 308 Win, 6mm Creedmoor, 450 Bushmaster, 350 Legend, 400 Legend, 223 Rem, 6.5 Grendel, 30-06 Sprg, 270 Win, 6.5 PRC, 7mm PRC, 22 ARC, 6mm ARC, and 300 Win Mag.
- Prairie: 22 inches (560 mm) alloy steel sporter barrel with a Smoked Bronze Cerakote finish and black and gold splatter finish stock, with an overall length of 41.25 inches (1,048 mm) for both long and short-action cartridges. It does not include a factory muzzle break, instead includes a thread protector. It is offered in 6.5 Creedmoor, 308 Win, 223 Rem, 7mm PRC, 22 ARC,and 300 Win Mag.
- Scout: 16.10 inches (409 mm) barrel carbine version of the Standard model. It is a Lipsey's distributor exclusive model. It is the only model to feature AR style iron sights with a windage adjustable rear sight. Barrel is finished with a Smoked Bronze Cerakote and features a factory installed flash suppressor. It is currently only available in 308 Win.
- Patrol: 16.10 inches (409 mm) barrel carbine version. featuring a black splatter finished stock and picatinny rail. The Barrel is finished with a Graphite Black Cerakote and features a factory installed thread protector. It is currently available in 308 Win, 5.56 NATO, and 6mm ARC, with 338 ARC, 300 Win Mag, and 7mm PRC coming soon.

== See also ==
- BMS Cam rifle
- Mossberg MVP
- Remington Model 7615
