= Mossberg 702 Plinkster =

- Mossberg 702 Plinkster
- Type: Semi automatic rifle
- Place of origin: Brazil

Production history
- Manufacturer: Companhia Brasileira de Cartuchos
- Produced: 2003–present
- No. built: 570,000+
- Variants: 715T, 801, 802

Specifications
- Mass: 4.0–4.5 lb (1.8–2.0 kg)
- Length: 37 in (94 cm) or 40 in (100 cm)
- Barrel length: 18 in (46 cm) or 21 in (53 cm)
- Cartridge: .22 Long Rifle
- Caliber: .22
- Action: Semi-automatic
- Feed system: 10- or 25-round box magazine
- Sights: Flip rear, hooded front

The Mossberg 702 Plinkster is a semi-automatic rifle chambered for the .22 Long Rifle cartridge, using 10- or 25-round box magazines. It has been sold under the Mossberg name since at least 2003. It is a competitor to the Marlin 795, the Ruger 10/22, the Remington 597, and the Mossberg Blaze.

The "Plinkster" name was previously applied to a different Mossberg offering—the Model 377, which was also chambered for .22 Long Rifle, but with a 15-round tubular magazine, available from approximately 1977 to 1984. "Plinking" is a popular term for informal recreational target shooting.

== Description ==
The 702 Plinkster is one of several .22 caliber rimfire rifles that Mossberg sells. It is available with many combinations of barrels and stocks, from synthetic to maple stock, and from chrome to blued steel barrel. The blued barrel is 18 inches (46 cm) long and the chrome barrel is 21 inches (53 cm) long; overall lengths are 37 inches (94 cm) and 40 inches (100 cm), respectively.

The 702 Plinkster is made in Brazil by Companhia Brasileira de Cartuchos (CBC) and is sold under the Mossberg name. It is essentially the CBC Model 7022 restyled to Mossberg's specifications and previously sold under the MagTech brand name. The bolt and receiver design is modeled on the Model 70 variant of the Marlin Model 60; the ejector, firing mechanism and feed system are different.

== Variants ==
- 702 Youth Bantam Plinkster, features an 18-inch (46 cm) barrel with an overall length of 35 inches (89 cm)
- 715T, a semi-automatic rifle based on the 702 action, fitted with an AR-style stock
- 801 Half-Pint Plinkster, a bolt-action rifle for youths, fitted with a limiting plug to restrict the magazine to a single round
- 802 Plinkster, a bolt-action rifle
