= Marlin Model 70P =

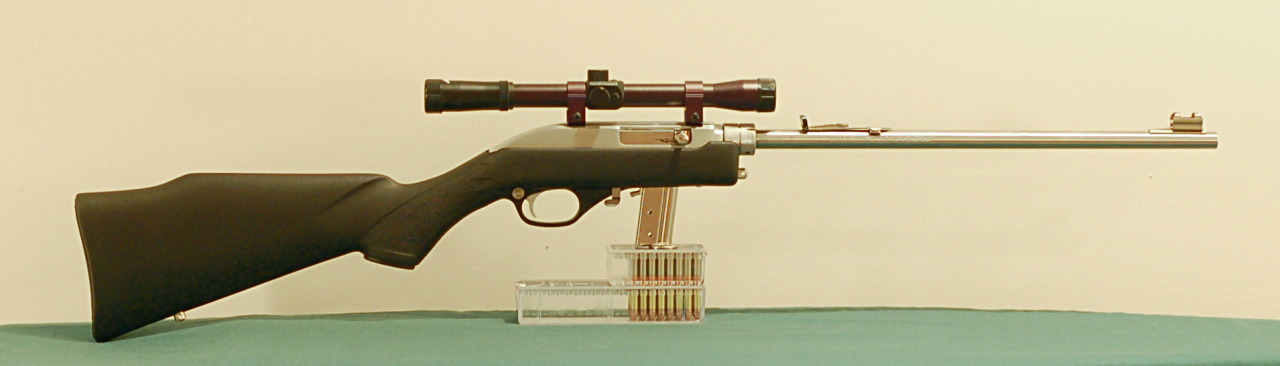
- Type: Semi-automatic rifle
- Place of origin: United States

Production history
- Variants: 70PSS

Specifications
- Mass: 3.25 lb (1.47 kg)
- Length: 35.25 in
- Barrel length: 16.25 in, with Micro-Groove rifling
- Cartridge: .22 LR
- Action: Semi-automatic self-loading
- Rate of fire: less than 2 seconds per shot, typical
- Feed system: 7 and 10-round magazines
- Sights: adjustable open rear, ramp front sight with high visibility orange post; cutaway Wide-Scan hood; integral .22 tip-off scope mounting rail.

The Marlin Model 70P, also known as the Marlin Papoose, is a .22 Long Rifle semi-automatic rifle manufactured by Marlin Firearms. The rifle is notable for its portability; it is less than 21 inches (530 mm) in length when disassembled and weighs 3.25 pounds. Disassembly requires loosening a barrel retention nut by hand or with a supplied tool. It is designed as a hiker and camper utility rifle, and appeals to the same market as the AR-7. The Model 70P is based on the earlier Marlin Model 70 (currently listed as Model 795) that has a fixed barrel and conventional stock. Its semi-automatic action originated with the Marlin Model 60. The Marlin Model 70PSS variant has a synthetic stock and stainless steel barrel.

The rifle has an open rear sight and ramp front sight with high visibility orange post surrounded by a cutaway hood. The receiver has an integral .22 tip-off scope mounting rail. Swivel studs for a carrying strap are embedded in the synthetic stock. Included Marlin accessories are a 7-round metal magazine, a tool for adjusting the barrel nut, and a padded nylon carrying case designed to float in water. Optional accessories from Marlin include 7 and 10-round nickel plated metal magazines. Third party 25-round magazines are available.

== Gallery ==
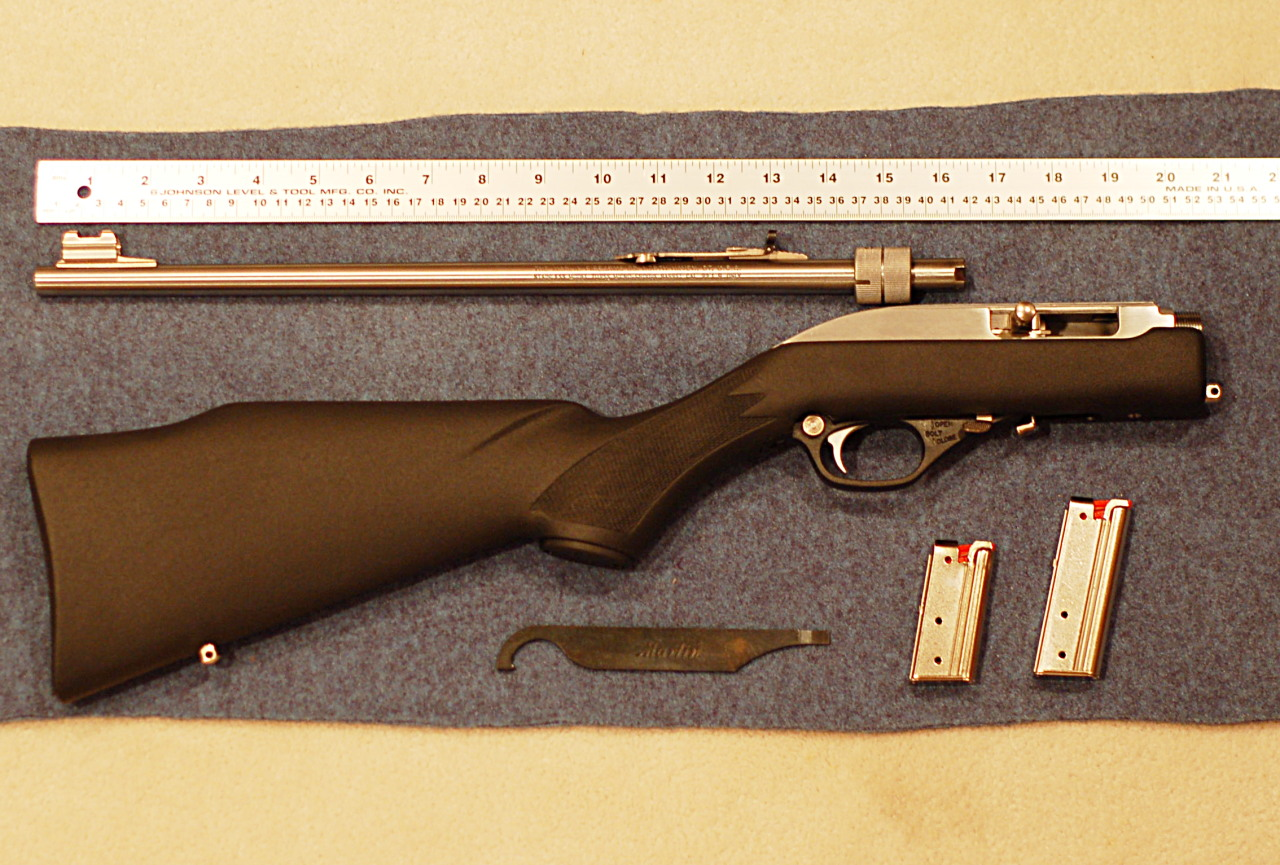
2008 Marlin Model 70PSS, disassembled, with ruler for scale
