= M67 =

M67, M-67, or M.67 may refer to:

- M-67 (Michigan highway), a state highway in Michigan in the United States
- M67 grenade, a fragmentation hand grenade
- M67 motorway, a motorway in Greater Manchester, England
- M67 recoilless rifle, an anti-tank weapon
- The M-67 submachine gun; see MEMS M-52/60
- M67 Zippo, a flamethrower tank variant of the M48 Patton tank
- BMW M67, a 1998 turbodiesel automobile engine
- Mauser M67, a rifle made by Kongsberg Våpenfabrikk based on M/98k actions, which again were based on captured Karabiner 98k (K98k) actions
- Macchi M.67, an Italian racing floatplane of 1929
- Messier 67, an open star cluster in the constellation Cancer
