= Remington Model 597 =

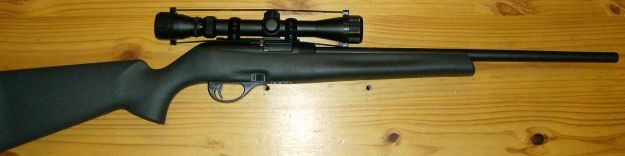
- Type: Rifle
- Place of origin: United States

Production history
- Designed: 1997
- Manufacturer: Remington Arms
- Produced: 1997–2019

Specifications (standard model)
- Mass: 5.5 lb (2.5 kg)
- Length: 40 in (100 cm)
- Barrel length: 20 in (51 cm)
- Cartridge: .22 LR, .22 WMR, .17 HMR (obsolete)
- Action: semi-automatic
- Muzzle velocity: 350 to 1750 ft/s (110 to 530 m/s)
- Maximum firing range: 2.0 miles or 3.2 km
- Feed system: 10-round detachable magazine (.22 LR) 8-round magazine (.22 WMR / .17 HMR) or 30-round magazine (aftermarket)

The Remington Model 597 is an American semi-automatic rifle that was manufactured by Remington Arms at the company's Mayfield, Kentucky and Huntsville, Alabama plant. The .22 Long Rifle version has a removable 10-round magazine, while the magazines for the larger .22 WMR and .17 HMR cartridges hold eight rounds.

The .22 LR and .22 WMR versions began production in 1997, and the .17 HMR version in 2002. Remington announced that the 597 had been discontinued in 2019.

== Overview and variants ==
The Remington 597, a competitor to the Marlin Model 795, the Mossberg 702 Plinkster, and the Ruger 10/22, was available in a number of configurations, with both synthetic and laminated wood stock options. The standard barrel length is 20 inches. Its unique bolt-guidance system uses two steel guide rails, and the bolt locks in the open position when the last round is fired.

The receiver has integral 11 mm dovetail rail (sometimes called "tip-off" scope mounts), as well as pre-drilled and tapped mount points that will accommodate an optional Weaver-style scope base. The "tip-off" mounts are suitable only for small, light scopes for air rifle or rimfire use. For heavier scopes, the Weaver base is recommended rather than the tip-off mounts, since the greater mass may cause the scope to shift and "lose zero."

A target model is available with a 16.5-inch bull barrel with no sights, as well as a "tactical" variant that is all black with a threaded barrel tip to accommodate a flash hider, muzzle brake or suppressor. Two exclusive models sold by Dick's Sporting Goods come with a 3–9× scope, with one having a 20-inch bull barrel.

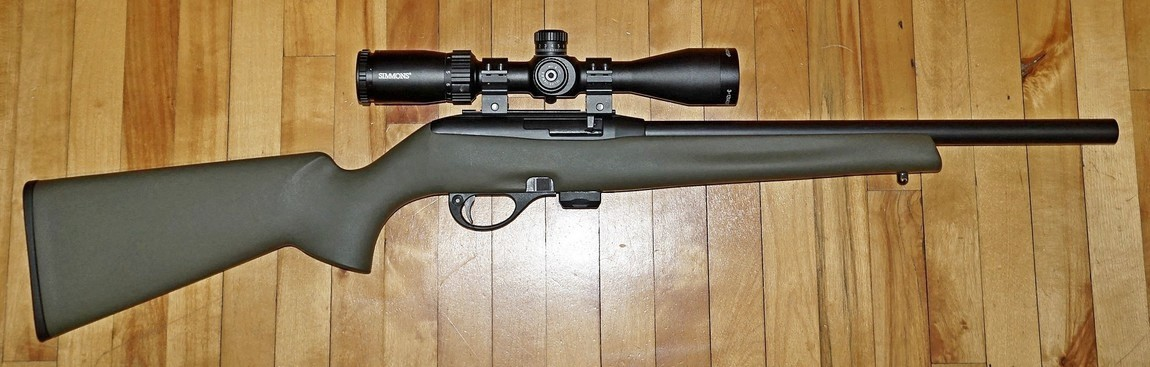
Remington 597 HB 16.5 inch barrel with a green stock

== Magazines ==
The 597 had at least four generations of magazines. Early magazines were made of plastic and caused a number of feeding problems when loaded with more than three to four rounds. This early magazine was seen as a major detractor to what was otherwise a good rifle. As the magazine aged and dirt, oil and unburned powder got ground into the magazine and the follower, the feeding problems could increase.

The second generation of magazines was made from investment-cast aluminum alloy. These were available for purchase in the year 2000. The base cap and follower were still made of plastic. This new magazine was a great improvement over the first generation. The new-style magazine was shipped with the later rifles. These magazines were also available separately for purchase.

The third generation of magazines was very similar to the second generation with only small differences, but a noticeable improvement in reliability. Third-generation magazines can be identified by the number "10" stamped on the side; the second generation has just "10", while the third generation also has a circle stamped around the number.

The fourth-generation magazine features a black coating which is intended to improve feed reliability.

Aftermarket extended-capacity magazines are also available.

== Aftermarket parts ==
The 597 is gaining more aftermarket parts, but it still lacks the enormous variety of the Ruger 10/22, which is its competitor in the marketplace. There are now aftermarket barrels, iron sights, hammers and extractors available for the Model 597, as well as the magazines noted earlier. Volquartsen Custom offers aftermarket barrels, hammers, and extractors. Tech-SIGHTS offers adjustable aperture sights.

== Model history ==
- .22 Long Rifle (1997–2019)
- .22 Winchester Magnum Rimfire (1997–2019)
- .17 Hornady Magnum Rimfire (2002–2009)

== Recall information ==
In August 2009, Remington warned customers to discontinue use of the Model 597 in .17 HMR due to safety issues. The company asked that all Model 597 rifles chambered in .17 HMR, along with any Remington-brand .17 HMR ammunition, be returned to Remington, and offered reimbursement coupons in exchange. A subsequent class-action lawsuit, William S. Yancey v. Remington Arms Company, LLC; Cascade Cartridge, Inc. a/k/a CCI Ammunition, complained that the amounts were below the original purchase prices of the rifles and ammunition, and that they were only good for purchase of further Remington products.
