= Mossberg 100ATR =

- Type: Hunting Rifle
- Place of origin: United States

Production history
- Manufacturer: O.F. Mossberg & Sons

Specifications
- Mass: 6.6 lb (3.0 kg)
- Length: 42 in (1,100 mm)
- Barrel length: 22 in (560 mm)
- Cartridge: .243 Winchester.270 Winchester; 7mm-08 Remington.308 Winchester.30-06 Springfield
- Action: Bolt-action repeater
- Feed system: 4 round internal magazine
- Sights: Rear V notch, front post, rails for scope mounting

The Model 100ATR is a bolt-action rifle from O.F. Mossberg & Sons. ATR stands for "all-terrain rifle".

The ATR is available in .243 Winchester, .270 Winchester, 7mm-08 Remington, .308 Winchester, .30-06 Springfield. It has a 4+1 round via internal magazine. It currently features camouflage stocks as well as synthetic and walnut. It also features a floating fluted barrel.

== See also ==
- BMS Cam rifle
- Remington Model 7615
- Ruger American Rifle
