= BMS Cam rifle =

BMS Cam
- Type: Precision rifle
- Place of origin: Great Britain

Service history
- Used by: Mostly hunters and sport shooters. Also some use by British police and military units, American police units

Production history
- Designed: 1980
- Manufacturer: BMS Trading Ltd
- Variants: Milcam, Comcam, Snicam, Covcam, Polcam

Specifications
- Mass: 3.6 to 5 kg (depending on configuration)
- Length: 1000-1200 mm
- Barrel length: 500-620 mm
- Cartridge: 5.56×45mm NATO
- Action: Bolt action
- Effective firing range: 500-600 m
- Feed system: STANAG magazine
- Sights: Integrated Weaver rail for mounting a scope mount. Some older models came with iron sights and/or a dovetail rail.

The BMS Cam rifle is a series of British bolt-action rifles made by BMS Trading Ltd chambered in the 5.56×45mm NATO cartridge and using STANAG magazines. The rifle was introduced in 1980 and is still in production as of 2018. The rifle has been popular for hunting and sport shooting in the UK, and has also seen some limited use as a sharpshooter rifle by some British police and military units as well as some American police units.

== Technical ==
The name of the rifle comes from the unique camming mechanism design of the bolt which is used in order to provide a mechanical advantage to ensure chambering and primary extraction with the AR-type barrel and bolt head used on the rifle. With its seven bolt lugs the rifle has a bolt lift of only 22.5°, which is very short compared to the 60 to 90° bolt lifts found on most other rifles. Patents for the camming action were applied for in 1988, but were refused in 1992 as details had been made public by the makers before the application was submitted. The mechanism cocks on closing similar to the Lee–Enfield, and the trigger unit is very similar to the Mauser K98. Due to its firing pin design being similar to the Mauser, the Cam rifle has a lock time comparable to the Mauser. The rifle has a relatively small and constricted ejection port which enhances receiver stiffness. Trigger pull weight can be adjusted using a hex key, and the safety operates similarly to the Garand rifle. The trigger guard is oversized to facilitate operation with gloves in cold weather.

== Variants ==
Numerous versions have been made over the years. The latest versions all have a carbon fiber composite stock. Options for mounting optical sights have also varied thoroughout the years, from iron sights only on the first models, to various dovetail rails on later models. All current models have an integrated Weaver rail (not Picatinny compatible).

- Series 1 (Mk1): Wooden stock with a wooden handguard. Only iron sights.
- Series 2 (Mk2): Wooden stock with a weight saving cutout in the rear and without a handguard. Detachable Weaver rail.
- Series 3 (Mk3): Carbon fiber stock in a somewhat similar design to the Mk2. Integrated Weaver rail.

=== Models ===
- Milcam was originally offered in a wooden stock with iron sights only, an A2 flash hider and no mounting point for a scope. Later the HB version was offered, which was tapped for a scope sight and had a heavier barrel. The current Milcam version has an integrated Weaver rail and a carbon fiber stock.
- Comcam is a more compact carbine version with a shorter barrel than the Milcam. The Comcam also originally came with no scope mount.
- Snicam: A dedicated precision rifle produced to tighter tolerances. The Snicam has always been delivered without iron sights, and therefore has always had some form of mounting options for an optical sight. The current stock is a carbon fiber composite. All versions of the Snicam has had a stock adjustable for cheek height and length of pull. The Snicam has a special prong style flash hider, and has been delivered with different factory option bipods over the years (e.g. Atlas, G3 style or Versa-Pod spigot style).
- Covcam was an integrally suppressed takedown version.
- Polcam was a simplified and lower cost version of the Snicam precision rifle, and had a stock with no adjustment for length or height.

== See also ==
- Mossberg MVP
- Remington Model 7615
- Ruger American Rifle
