= Mossberg 715T =

- Type: Rifle

Production history
- Manufacturer: O.F. Mossberg & Sons
- Produced: 2010–2015
- Variants: 715T Flat Top, 715P

Specifications
- Barrel length: 16.25 inches (413 mm)
- Cartridge: .22 Long Rifle
- Caliber: .22
- Action: Semi-automatic
- Feed system: 10- or 25-round box magazine

The Mossberg 715T is a semi-automatic rifle that was produced by O.F. Mossberg & Sons. It is a variant of the Mossberg 702 Plinkster, designed with an AR-15-style stock and body. It is chambered for .22 Long Rifle and comes with a 10-round or 25-round magazine. Now possibly classified as prohibited in Canada due to it being improperly classified as an AR-15 Variant even though it has no internal components in common with the AR-15 rifle.

== History ==
The 715T was originally produced with an adjustable rear sight mount (with integrated carry handle) and an adjustable front sight. In 2012, a "Flat Top" version was introduced with removable and adjustable front and rear sights, along with a Picatinny rail. The Flat Top was also available in Red Dot Combo and Camo models. The stock was either a fixed length option of 13 inches (330 mm) or a six-position adjustable option of 10.5–14.25 inches (267–362 mm).

In 2014, Mossberg introduced the 715P, a pistol style version also based on the 702 Plinkster. A "Duck Commander" model of the 715P featured an electronic sight and a camouflage-pattern stock.
