= Tubb 2000 =

Tubb 2000 a/k/a/ T2K
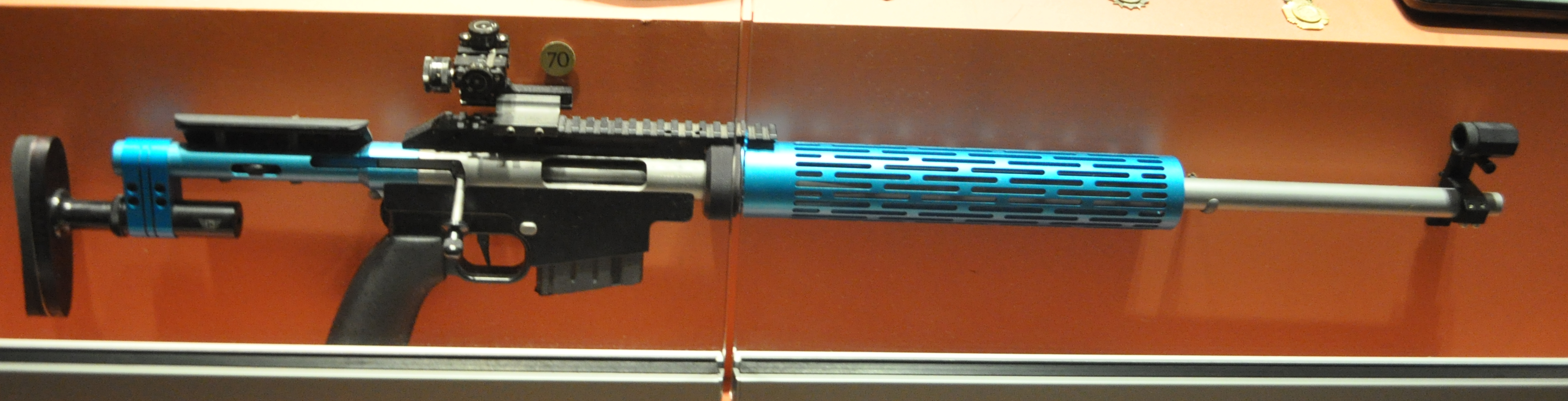
- Type: Competition rifle
- Place of origin: United States

Production history
- Designer: David Tubb
- Designed: 2000
- Manufacturer: McMillan Brothers Rifle Co.
- Produced: 2000–2012
- Variants: Tubb 2000c, Tubb 2000t, Tubb 2000 Spec-Tac-LR

Specifications
- Mass: 12.0 lb (5.4 kg)
- Cartridge: 6XC, .22-250 Remington, 6.5-284 Norma, 7mm-08 Remington, .308, 6mmBR Remington
- Action: manually operated rotary bolt action
- Feed system: 10 or 20 round detachable box magazine
- Sights: Iron sight or telescopic sight

The Tubb 2000 (also known as the T2K) rifle is a fully adjustable modular sports target rifle produced in the United States by the McMillan Brothers Rifle Company. It was designed and endorsed by 11-time NRA Highpower Rifle and ICFRA Palma World Champion David Tubb and Rock McMillan for long-range target shooting.

The Tubb 2000's barrel can be changed by the end-user, allowing the same rifle to support various calibers. Adjustable or user-changeable features include stock, sights, hand grip, trigger. It includes a quiet shock absorbing stock instead of a loud muzzle brake.

The successor to the Tubb 2000 was launched in 2017, and is called Tubb ATR (Advanced Tactical Rifle).
