= Métral submachine gun =

- Type: Submachine gun
- Place of origin: Switzerland

Production history
- Designer: Gérard Métral
- Designed: 1985

Specifications
- Mass: 2.9 kg
- Length: 600 mm (stock extended); 360 mm (stock folded)
- Barrel length: 200 mm
- Cartridge: 9×19mm Parabellum
- Caliber: 9 mm
- Action: Blowback, open bolt
- Rate of fire: 600 rpm
- Muzzle velocity: 390 m/s
- Effective firing range: 25 m
- Feed system: 32 round Sten type magazine
- Sights: Aperture rear sight, post-type front sight

The Métral submachine gun is a submachine gun designed by Swiss army reserves officer Gérard Métral intended for clandestine manufacture and distribution during foreign occupation circumstances.

It is a blowback, select fire, Uzi type design, open bolt submachine gun, with a side folding stock. The design and function of the parts are based on various existing submachine guns (like Suomi M1931 for the trigger mechanism and Ingram MAC-10 for bolt security etc.), along with some of the author's own innovations and solutions, for example, the bolt construction and folding stock.

Although the subtitle of the book detailing its design and constructions calls it "homemade", the design is mainly intended for a more professional, almost mass-production kind of manufacture.

Its designer calls for any constructor to be skilled at metalwork, with access to a shop lathe, drill press and milling machine (the last being optional but very helpful). Métral himself says of the main spring, barrel and magazine construction: "Try doing it yourself only if you have no other choice" and calls them "difficult to build". Some parts need hardening, which is usually beyond the means of an amateur, and several parts are intended to be purchased or having them made to order. However care has been taken to keep the appearance of all the separate parts as inconspicuous as possible.
