= Remington Model 7600 =

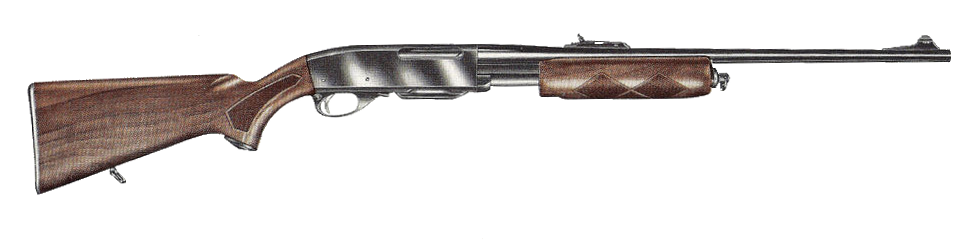
- Type: Pump action rifle
- Place of origin: United States

Production history
- Manufacturer: Remington Arms
- Produced: 1981–2020
- Variants: see variants

Specifications
- Mass: 7.5 lb (3.4 kg)
- Length: 42.6 in (108 cm)
- Barrel length: 22 in (56 cm)
- Cartridge: .243 Winchester; .270 Winchester; .30-06 Springfield; .308 Winchester; .223 Remington (7615 only); 6mm Remington (disc 1985); .280 Remington (disc 2000); .35 Whelen (disc 1996); .35 Whelen (special run 2005 only); .35 Remington (special run 2005 only)
- Action: Pump action, rotating bolt
- Feed system: 4-round detachable box magazine (Model 7615 uses STANAG magazines)
- Sights: Iron sights

The Remington Model 7600 is a series of pump-action centerfire rifles made by Remington Arms. The Model 7600 is a progression from the original Model 760 pump-action rifle which Remington produced from 1952 to 1981. Production of the Model Six began in 1981 and was discontinued in 1987. Production of the Sportsman model 76 began in 1985 and was discontinued in 1987. Production of the model 7600 began in 1987 and was discontinued in 2020.

== Variants ==
There are a number of variants of the Model 7600 which Remington has manufactured over the years.

Model 7600
Introduced in 1981, the standard version is fitted with a conventional wood walnut stock.

Model 7600 Synthetic
Introduced in 1998, the synthetic model is identical to the standard 7600 except that it has a matte black synthetic stock.

Model 7600 Carbine
Re-Introduced in 1987, the carbine version is available in .30-06 fitted with a 18½ barrel.

Model 7600 Special Purpose
Offered from 1993 to 1994, the Special Purpose model featured a non-glare finished walnut stock, a matte black finish and sling swivels.

Model 7600P Patrol Rifle
Introduced in 2002, the Model 7600P Patrol Rifle in .308 Winchester featuring an advanced sight system. Answering the call for a low profile, user-friendly patrol rifle, Remington now offers this durable, pump-action rifle for standard duty use. It features a black synthetic stock with sling studs and Wilson Combat ghost-ring rear sights.

Model 7615 Police Patrol Rifle
The Model 7615P comes in .223 Remington caliber, uses standard M16/AR-15 style STANAG magazines and has a 16½" barrel. Just like the Model 7600P, the Model 7615P is designed to be a low-profile, user-friendly firearm for police officers to use alongside the Remington Model 870 shotgun.

== Features ==
Buttstocks
The 7600 and 7615 models use a similar sized receiver as the 20-gauge version of the 870 shotgun, and thus share a cross-compatibility of buttstocks. However, buttstocks made for the more common 12-gauge version of the Remington 870 will usually not fit.

Barrel
The 7600 and 7615 models feature a free floated barrel attached to the receiver using a 1/4 inch (6.35 mm) UNF bolt screw for enhanced accuracy (contrary to the Model 760 which is not free floated).

Bolt
To aid extraction, the 7600 has a two lug bolt design as an improvement from the multi-lugged bolt on previous models such as the 760.

== See also ==
- BMS Cam rifle
- Mossberg MVP
- Ruger American Rifle
