= FA-MAS Type 62 =

- Type: Battle Rifle
- Place of origin: France

Production history
- Designed: 1962
- Manufacturer: Manufacture d'armes de Saint-Étienne

Specifications
- Mass: 4.53 kg
- Length: 1040 mm
- Barrel length: 500 mm
- Cartridge: 7.62×51mm NATO
- Caliber: 7.62 mm
- Action: Gas-operated
- Rate of fire: 600 rpm
- Effective firing range: 400–800 m
- Feed system: 20-round detachable box magazine
- Sights: Iron sights

The FA-MAS Type 62 is a 7.62×51mm NATO rifle developed by the French Army as a replacement for the MAS-49/56. It was the last in series of 40 different prototype rifles designed between 1952 and 1962. However, the introduction of the 5.56×45mm cartridge caused the French to rethink their approach and the project was eventually cancelled. The Type 62's bayonet was later adopted for use on the FAMAS rifle.

== Predecessors ==
=== Type-55 ===
The MAS-55 has its gas piston underneath its barrel and operated in a similar way to the FM1924/29 light machine gun but resulted in a heavy rifle for its type.

=== Type-56 ===
The Type-56 was a simpler alternative to the Type-55 and was closer to the FN FAL.

=== Type-59 ===
The Type-59 came with an improved stock and foregrip. It also came with a folding stock, bipod and infra-red sight as the AP61.

== See also ==
- List of battle rifles
