= Mauser MP-57 =

Maschinenpistole MP-57
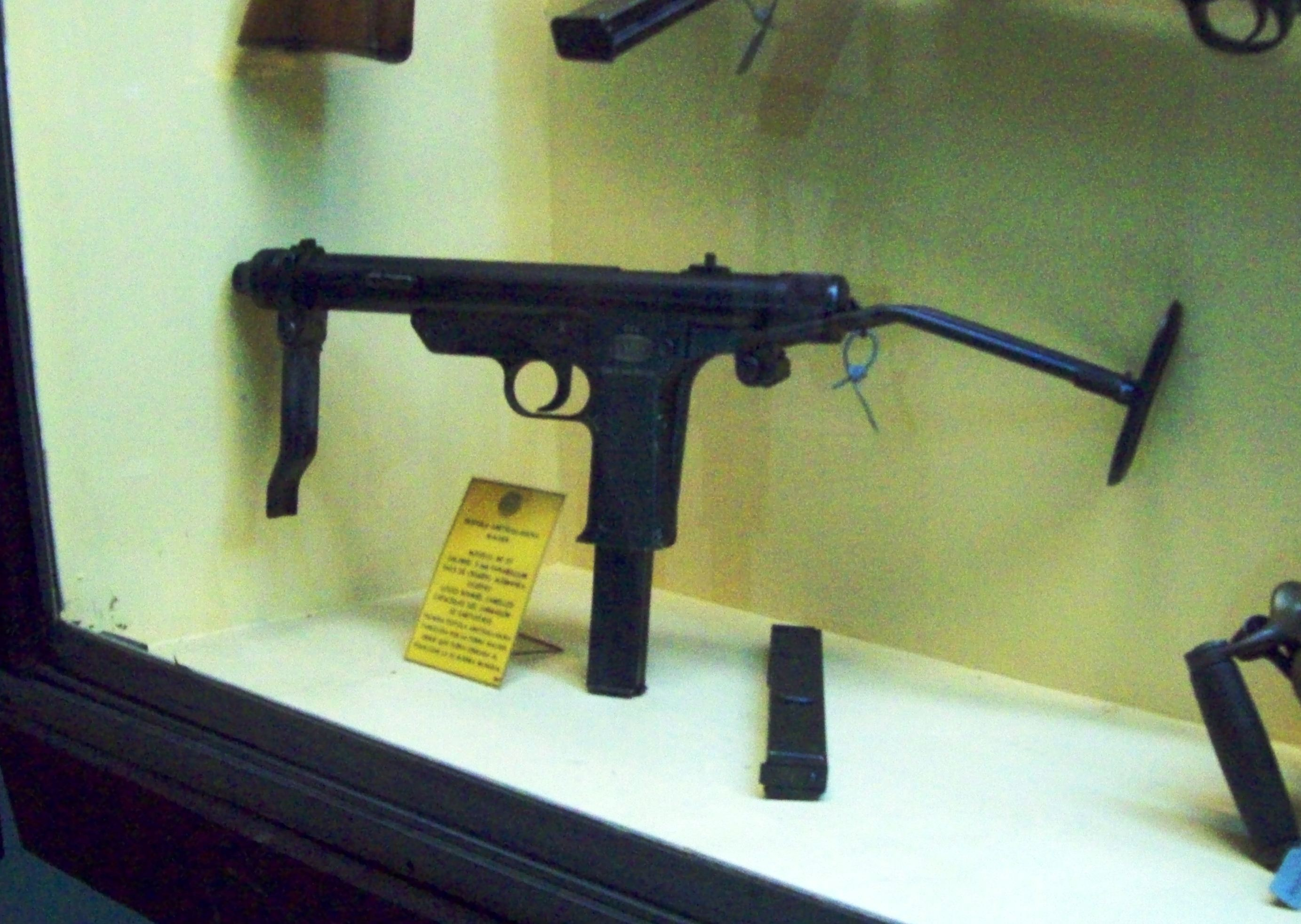
- Type: Submachine gun
- Place of origin: West Germany

Production history
- Designer: Louis Camillus
- Designed: 1955-1957
- Manufacturer: Mauser
- Produced: 1957
- No. built: 25
- Variants: Erma MP-56; Mauser MP-57

Specifications
- Mass: 2.80 kg
- Length: 610mm, 430mm (stock folded)
- Barrel length: 260mm
- Cartridge: 9×19mm Parabellum
- Caliber: 9mm
- Action: Blowback, open bolt
- Rate of fire: 800rpm
- Feed system: 32-round box magazine
- Sights: Iron sights

The MP-57 is a submachine gun which was manufactured by Mauser after the Second World War for the then newly established Bundeswehr. It was chambered in the 9×19mm round and fed from a magazine inserted in the pistol grip.
