= Milkor 40 mm UBGL grenade launcher =

Milkor 40mm UBGL
- Type: Underslung grenade launcher
- Place of origin: South Africa

Production history
- Designer: Andries Piek
- Manufacturer: Milkor (Pty) Ltd
- Variants: US-Mk 4 US-Mk 4S

Specifications
- Mass: 0.95kg without Sight (Ladder Sight: 155g) (Saddle Sight: 85g) (Reflex Sight: 210g)
- Width: 60mm
- Height: 90mm
- Caliber: 40mm
- Barrels: 6° constant rifling (1 turn in 1200mm)
- Rate of fire: 6 rounds per minute
- Effective firing range: 250m
- Feed system: Single shot
- Sights: Saddle, Ladder or Reflex Sight

The Milkor 40mm UBGL grenade launcher is a lightweight single-shot, underslung grenade launcher designed and developed in South Africa by Milkor (Pty) Ltd. It can be attached to most modern assault weapons and rifles using a Picatinny rail system. The UBGL is capable of firing standard 40mm rounds including illumination and observation rounds (max length of 140 mm). Clip-on, clip-off mechanism allows the UBGL to be fitted, with an additional recoil buffer, to any weapon fitted with a Picatinny rail.

== Design ==
The UBGL is fitted with a steel barrel with constant-pitch rifling and swings to the side for loading and unloading of standard low-velocity 40mm cartridges. This enables the user to have a 40 mm grenade launcher capability together with an assault rifle. The UBGL can also be fired independently from a rifle (handheld) in an emergency. It can also be fitted to rifles and shotguns used in policing and is able to fire less lethal and lethal ammunition.

The US-Mk 4 has a mass of 1.68 kg (empty), while the new US-Mk 4S weighs 0.750 kg with an aluminium barrel or around 1 kg with a steel barrel. A “push-button” trigger mechanism is used in place of an actual trigger in order to differentiate between firing mechanisms of the rifle and the under barrel as the soldier might invariably, under duress, tend to pull the incorrect trigger if presented with two triggers. The opening mechanism swings to the side in order to enable the user to load ammunition without external interference of the weapon it is mounted to or other complications.

== Variants ==
- US-Mk 4 - Milkor 40mm UBGL Mk-4
- US-Mk 4S - Milkor 40mm UBGL Mk-4S

== Similar weapons ==
- M203 grenade launcher
- AG36
- GP-25
- Pallad grenade launcher
