= MEMS M-52/60 =

MEMS M-52/58
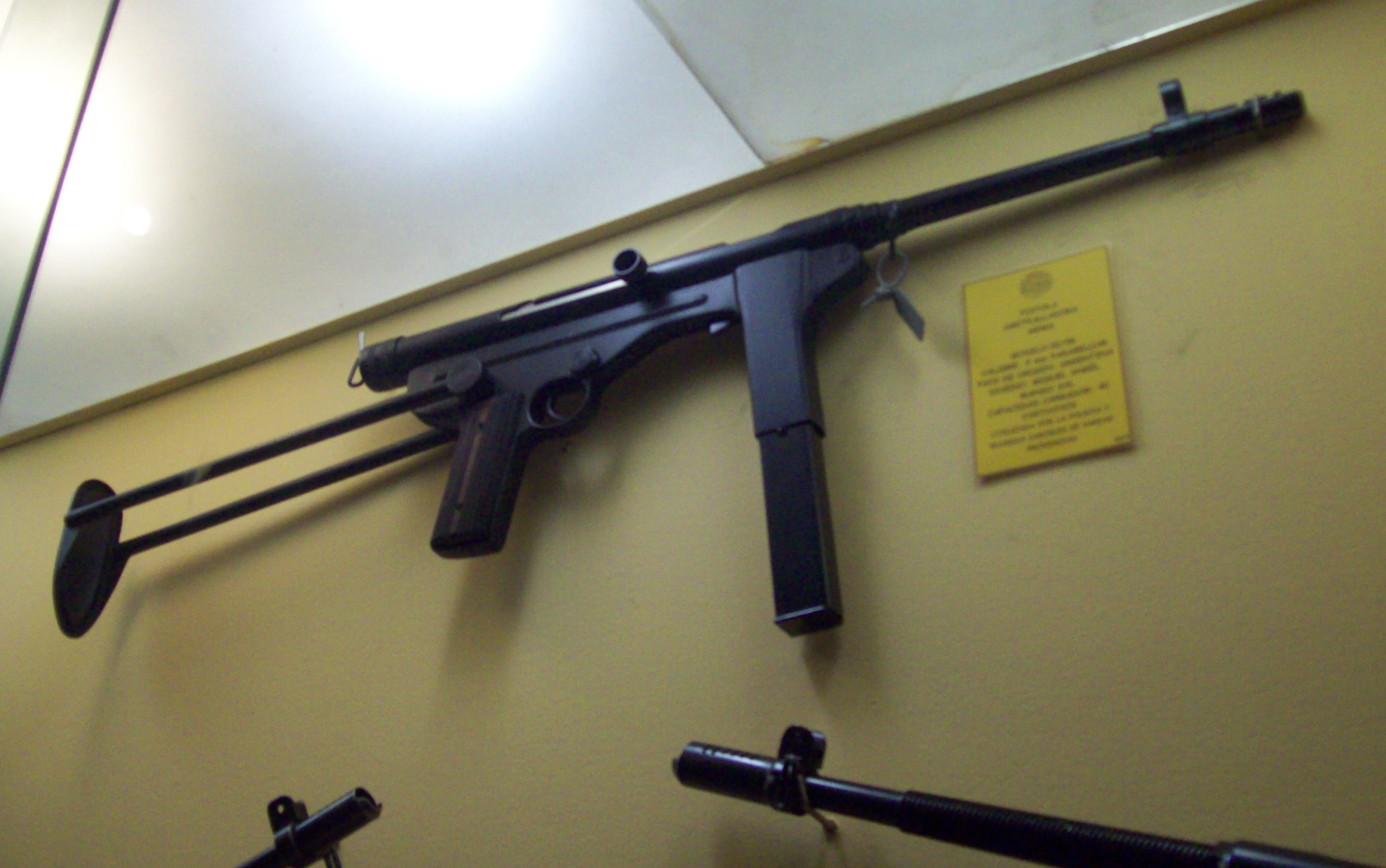
- MEMS submachine gun
- Type: Submachine gun
- Place of origin: Argentina

Service history
- Used by: EA; FAA; GNA; PFA; PNA; SPF Policía de Córdoba Banco Provincia de Córdoba
- Wars: Argentine Dirty War

Production history
- Designer: MEMS
- Manufacturer: Miguel Entrique Manzo Sal (MEMS)
- Variants: prototipo 1950; prototipo 1952; versión comercial M.E.M.S. 52/58; M.E.M.S.52/60; prototipo A.R.63; M67; M69

Specifications
- Mass: 3.30 kg
- Length: 800 mm (Stock Extended); 640 mm (Stock Retracted)
- Barrel length: 180 mm
- Cartridge: 9×19 mm Parabellum
- Caliber: 9 mm
- Barrels: 12 grooves, right hand rifling
- Action: Blowback-operated, Open bolt
- Rate of fire: 850 rpm
- Feed system: 40-round detachable box magazine
- Sights: Iron

The MEMS M-52/60 is a submachine gun of Argentine origin manufactured by Miguel Enrique Manzo Sal (MEMS). It is chambered in the 9×19mm round and fed from a 40-round magazine inserted in the forward pistol grip.

== Users ==
- Argentina
  - EA
  - FAA
  - GNA
  - PFA
  - PNA
  - SPF
