= Marlin Model 795 =

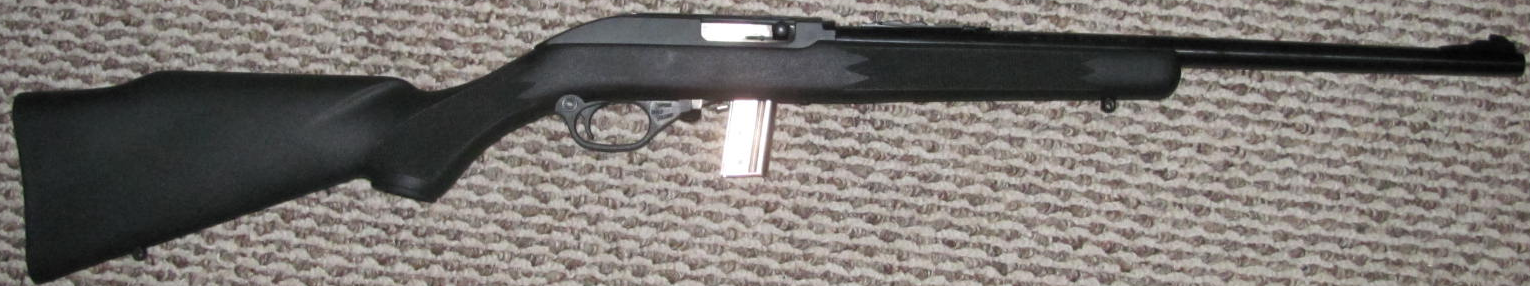
- Type: Rifle
- Place of origin: United States

Production history
- Manufacturer: Marlin Firearms
- Variants: see variants

Specifications
- Mass: 4.5 lb (2.0 kg)
- Length: 37 in (940 mm)
- Barrel length: 18 in
- Cartridge: .22 LR
- Caliber: .22 in (5.6 mm)
- Action: semi-automatic
- Feed system: 10-round box magazine, 25-round magazine (ProMag MAR-A1)
- Sights: open rear, ramp front

The Marlin Model 795 is an American .22 LR semi-automatic rifle produced by Remington Arms of Mayfield, Kentucky, formerly by Marlin Firearms Company of North Haven, Connecticut. Major features include micro-groove barrel, a cross-bolt safety, black synthetic stock, and 10-round nickel plated box magazine. It is similar to the Marlin 60, with slight barrel and action differences due to the magazine differences.

The rifle features a last round hold open of the action and a receiver that has a 3/8" groove for mounting optics.

== Manufacturer Recommended Ammunition ==
- CCI Mini-Mag
- CCI Mini-Mag Hollow Point
- Federal Classic High Velocity
- Winchester Super X High Velocity

== Variants ==
- Model 795-blued steel barrel and receiver
- Model 795SS-stainless steel barrel and receiver
- Model 795LTR (LTR stood for Liberty Training Rifle), produced in 2013 in collaboration with Project Appleseed.
- Model 70PSS takedown version, produced from 1984–present. (SS is the stainless steel version)
- Marlin 70HC with 25-round magazine (HC stood for High Capacity), produced from 1988–1996.
- Glenfield 70 with 7 & 12-round magazines from 1988–1996.
- Marlin 7000 - Heavy Target Barrel version of the 795, made from 1997-2004
