= 7mm-08 Remington =

Necked down .308Win

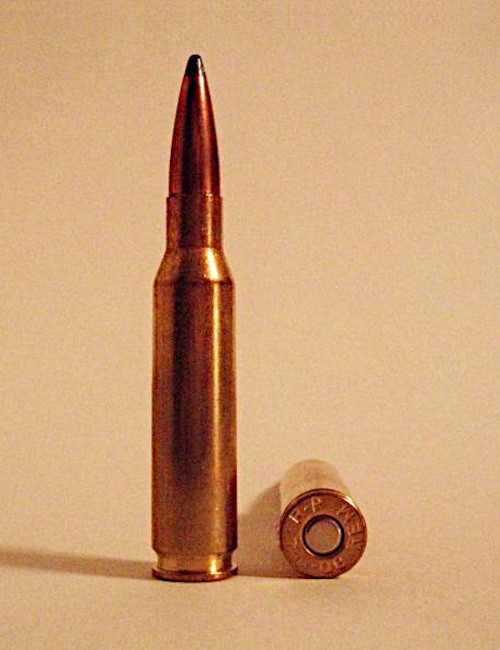
- Type: Rifle
- Place of origin: United States

Production history
- Designer: Remington Arms
- Designed: 1980

Specifications
- Parent case: .308 Winchester
- Case type: Rimless, bottleneck
- Bullet diameter: 0.284 in (7.2 mm)
- Land diameter: 0.277 in (7.0 mm)
- Neck diameter: 0.315 in (8.0 mm)
- Shoulder diameter: 0.454 in (11.5 mm)
- Base diameter: 0.470 in (11.9 mm)
- Rim diameter: 0.473 in (12.0 mm)
- Rim thickness: 0.054 in (1.4 mm)
- Case length: 2.035 in (51.7 mm)
- Overall length: 2.80 in (71 mm)
- Case capacity: 52.2 gr H_{2}O (3.38 cm^{3})
- Rifling twist: 1/9.5" (241 mm)
- Primer type: Large rifle
- Maximum pressure (C.I.P.): 60,191 psi (415.00 MPa)
- Maximum pressure (SAAMI): 61,000 psi (420 MPa)

Ballistic performance
Bullet mass/type	Velocity	Energy
140 gr (9.1 g) Nosler Partition	2,800 ft/s (850 m/s)	2,437 ft⋅lbf (3,304 J)
150 gr (9.7 g) Speer Hot-Cor SP	2,650 ft/s (810 m/s)	2,339 ft⋅lbf (3,171 J)
175 gr (11.3 g) Nosler Part	2,595 ft/s (791 m/s)	2,617 ft⋅lbf (3,548 J)
- Test barrel length: 24 in Sources: Federal Cartridge Co. ballistics page, 175gr

The 7mm-08 Remington is a rifle cartridge that is almost a direct copy of a wildcat cartridge developed around 1958 known as the 7mm/308. As these names would suggest, it is the .308 Winchester case necked down to accept 7 mm (.284) bullets with a small increase in case length. Of cartridges based upon the .308, it is the second most popular behind only the .243 Winchester. However, the .308 is more popular than both. In 1980, the Remington Arms company popularized the cartridge by applying its own name and offering it as a chambering for their Model 788 and Model 700 rifles, along with a limited-run series within their Model 7600 pump-action rifles during the early 2000s.

== Handloading ==
The popularity of the cartridge means there is a fairly wide selection of factory loads, making it a choice even for those who do not handload. Bullets weighing from 100 to 197 grains are available. Bullets in the 120 to 160-grain range will suit most hunting applications while long-range shooters will opt for the heavier bullets to take advantage of their higher ballistic coefficients. Medium burning rifle powders usually work best in the 7mm-08.

== Uses ==
With the wide range of bullet weights available, the 7mm-08 is suitable for "varminting, game-hunting, Metallic Silhouette, and long-range shooting." It is also suitable for plains game." For long-range target and metallic silhouette shooting, the "plastic-tipped 162-grain A-Max has proven to be very accurate with a 0.625 BC (G1). This A-Max bullet, and the 150-grain Sierra Match King, are popular with silhouette shooters."

The 7mm-08 Remington works in most hunting environments, including dense forest areas and large open fields. It has a flatter trajectory than the .308 Winchester and .30-06 Springfield at similar bullet weights because the slightly smaller-diameter 7mm bullet generally has a better ballistic coefficient (BC), and is thus less affected by drag and crosswind while in flight. Its trajectory is comparable to the .270 Winchester.

The cartridge is highly compatible with experienced shooters and hunters. However, because its recoil exceeds .243 Win. and less than most loads in a .308 Win., its mild recoil makes it suitable also for youth and adults who are new shooters.

Howard Brant of Shooting Industry magazine wrote: "the 7mm-08 is a real sleeper as far as the hunting field is concerned. It is a grand cartridge which packs more than sufficient wallop to efficiently down all medium-sized big-game animals found in North America and elsewhere."

Wayne van Zwoll of Petersen's Hunting magazine wrote: "Efficient case design and a bullet weight range suitable for most North American big game make the 7mm-08 a fine choice for all-around hunting. Civil in recoil, it's a perfect match for lightweight, short-action rifles. It has also courted favor on metallic silhouette ranges, where its 140-grain bullets reach 500-yard targets faster and with as much energy as 150-grain .308s." He also described it as "deadly" for elk.

David E. Petzal of Field & Stream, wrote, "The virtues of the 7mm/08 include very light recoil, not much muzzle blast, plenty of bullet weight to do the job, and gilt-edged accuracy."

The 7mm-08, with appropriate loads, meets the required standards for moose hunting in Sweden, Finland, and Norway. Such loads allow it, for that purpose, to be compared favourably with the 6.5×55 SE, 7×57mm, 7×57mmR, 300 Savage, 303 British, and some .308 Winchester and .270 Winchester loads. With appropriately constructed bullets, the cartridge is usable on elk, black bears and hogs.

The 7mm-08 is considered by some to be unsuitable for use on the three big bears (polar, brown, and grizzly) and on other dangerous game. In a self-defensive situation requiring stopping power for dangerous game at close range, use of a larger and heavier caliber is strongly advised. Stephen Herrero, a Canadian bear behavior expert, cites a study by the U. S. Forest Service in Alaska that concluded the .458 Winchester Magnum with a 510-grain load, .375 H&H Magnum with a 300-grain load, .338 Winchester Magnum with a 300-grain load, and .30-06 Springfield with a 220-grain load were "superior for protection against bears".

The 7mm-08 has been popular with metallic silhouette shooters. The 2014 high NRA Nation Championship equipment survey listed the 7mm-08 as third most popular caliber for both the high-power rifle and high-power hunter rifle competition. Two reasons why the 7mm-08 is popular in some circles are the efficiency of the .284 bullets and reduced recoil compared to .308 loads. "Anything a 7mm can do, a .30 caliber of comparable sectional density and ballistic coefficient can also do. The catch is, in order to send a .30-caliber slug over a trajectory as flat as that 7mm bullet, about 20 percent more recoil is going to be generated. . . . [A bullet in] 7mm produces clearly superior downrange performance in terms of delivered energy and trajectory at any given recoil level [compared to a bullet in .30 caliber]." More recently, use of the 7mm-08 in target shooting has been affected by the introduction of the 6.5 Creedmoor, with its own efficiencies in recoil, energy, and trajectory (similar to the 6.5x55 SE, which is a long-range target cartridge in some countries).

== Cartridge comparisons ==
Edward A. Matunas, who was involved in developing reloading manuals for Lyman described the 7mm-08 Remington as "an efficient round [that] competes effectively against the .308 Winchester." Jeff Cooper give the 7mm-08 his unqualified support for use in Scout rifles: "A true Scout comes in .308 or 7mm-08". The 7mm-08 with 139-140 grain loads does well against some 150-grain .308 Win. loads, providing good energy levels. One example is the Remington 7mm-08 140 PSP (1490 fpe at 300 yards) compared with the Remington 308 150 grain PSP (1344 fpe at 300 yards).

The 7mm-08 invites a ballistic comparison with the veteran, highly esteemed 7×57mm Mauser. American rifle handloading writers such as Ken Waters, Frank B. Petrini, John Wootters, Clay Harvey, Bob Milek, and John Barsness vary on which cartridge generates higher velocities with top handloads in modern rifles with equal barrel lengths. Layne Simpson, an American handloading gun writer who has worked with the 7mm-08 since 1979, earlier considered it and the 7×57mm as ballistic equals, but more recently has noted that the 7x57 is faster by 100 fps. John Barsness has argued that the handloaded performance of the 7mm-08 and 7×57mm is "identical." Any significant difference perhaps reflects more variations among individual rifles than a clear winner between two quite similar cartridges. Norma Precision notes in its description that the shorter-cased 7mm-08 loses 100–150 ft/s (30–46 m/s) to the 7×57mm, though its own reloading information does not confirm this gap. Most times in Norma's reloading data the 7mm-08 has the edge.

In January 2002, Dave Anderson of Guns Magazine compared four of his favorite 7mm cartridges (7×57mm Mauser, .280 Remington, .284 Winchester, and 7mm-08 Rem.), and concluded: "But consider everything –performance, recoil, rifle size and weight, rifle availability, ammunition availability and selection — and the winner, rather to my surprise, is the 7mm-08 Remington. Ten years ago, even five years ago, I wouldn't have said that. But this efficient, effective little cartridge is a good one, and it's going to be around for a long time."

Its comparison with the 270 Win. is complicated. Clay Harvey, for instance, says the 7mm-08 is "definitely inferior ballistically." Remington Arms has its 140-grain load producing 2,960 ft/s (900 m/s), which is better than the 2,860 ft/s (870 m/s) produced by the 140-grain 7mm-08 load. The complicating factor is that, according to Edward A. Matunas, the .270 Win. "is not well served by factory ammunition. Velocities often vary widely and frequently are well below advertised levels." An example: Remington's own ballistic tables lists its only 150-grain 270 Win. loading, a Soft Point Core-Lokt (not a Pointed Soft Point Core-Lokt), as having a MV of 2,850 ft/s (870 m/s) and retaining 1,587 fpe at 200 yards. A 7mm-08 load with a more efficient 150-grain Nosler Partition at 2,700 ft/s (820 m/s) MV retains 1,790 fpe at 200 yards and 1,525 fpe at 300. Careful handloading with a bullet of higher BC should restore the gain the 270 Win. brings through its larger case. John Barsness says, however, that his wife Eileen has "recently discovered that the 7mm-08 kicks noticeably less than her old favorite the .270 WCF with similar results in the field."

The .30-06 is significantly more powerful in its 165-180 grain loads, especially when handloads or factory loads with bullets of good BC are used. However, Remington lists its .30-06 150-grain PSP as retaining 1,445 fpe at 300 yards, while listing its 140-grain 7mm-08 PSP with 1490 fpe at the same distance. In 1981 Ken Waters looked at Remington's (then) PSP loads and had this to say about the 140-grain 7mm-08 PSP: "From this we must conclude that it betters the 150-gr. 308 in all respects, and is about equal ballistically to Remington's 150-gr. PSP loading for the 30-06. Quite a billing, wouldn't you say?"

Bob Bell says "the little 7mm/08 equals or surpasses a surprising number of popular loads and is so close to the others that it makes one wonder if their edge is worth their attendant muzzle blast, recoil and rifle weight" when hunting deer, antelope, and caribou.

The caliber has found loyal adherents in Europe, such that Prvi Partizan (Serbia) offers an economical 140-grain (2860 fps) SPBT loading (available in the United States as well). British munitions enthusiasts are especially keen to point out the development of the .280 British round shortly after World War 2, which was ultimately rejected by the United States.

The 7mm-08 is popular in countries whose laws prohibit the civilian ownership of firearms chambered for military cartridges like the .308 Winchester/7.62×51mm NATO or .30-06 Springfield.

On April 20, 2022, the United States Army adopted the new Next Generation Squad Weapon, designated as the XM7, which will use a .278-inch bullet in a necked down 7.62×51mm NATO (colloquially .308 Winchester) case. The new cartridge is designated as 6.8 × 51 Common, known in the commercial market as the .277 Fury. The bullet size of the 6.8×51mm is virtually identical to the bullet of the 7mm-08 Remington. The difference in diameter is less than 1/128 of an inch (0.2 mm), or approximately the thickness of two human hairs. In addition, both the 6.8×51mm and the 7mm-08 Remington share the same parent case of the 7.62x51mm NATO, necked down to accept the respective bullet of each cartridge. The most dramatic departure between these two cartridges concerns a new manufacturing technique used in relation to the 6.8×51 combat cartridge (designated as the 135 gr (9 g) Hybrid Match), which employs a stainless-steel cartridge head. This new hybrid brass and stainless-steel case head can withstand case pressures up to 80,000 psi, significantly higher than the pressures generated in a standard 7mm-08 Remington case, permitting greater muzzle velocity and downrange energy when compared to the 7mm-08 Remington.

== Rifles ==
Since the 7mm-08 is fairly popular, most major hunting firearm manufacturers in the USA have one or more bolt-action rifles chambered for the round. Because of the cartridge's efficiency in shorter barrels, Ruger, Savage, Browning, Weatherby, and Remington offer it in carbine models as well as in guns with regular barrel lengths.

Browning offered it in several versions of their box fed lever-action rifle, the BLR, and in their gas-operated semiautomatic rifle called the BAR ShortTrac Stalker. Remington Arms offers a DPMS manufactured version of the AR-10, called the Model R-25, in 7mm-08. The entire range of Tikka rifles made by Sako are also available in 7mm-08. Ruger offers a few bolt-action rifles in this former wildcat round as well multiple models from Savage. Kimber also offers a number of rifles in the 7mm-08 as well.

== See also ==
- 7mm Remington cartridges
- 7mm caliber
- List of firearms
- List of rifle cartridges
- List of handgun cartridges
- Table of handgun and rifle cartridges
- Delta L problem
- Dub'l Duck
- .276 Pedersen
