= Marlin Model 60 =

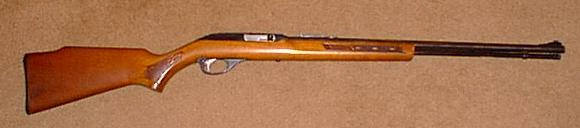
- Type: Semi-automatic rifle
- Place of origin: United States

Production history
- Designer: N/A
- Designed: 1960
- Produced: 1960–2020
- No. built: Over 11 million
- Variants: 60, 60C, 60DL, 60S-CF, 60SB, 60SS, 60SSK, 60SSBL, 60W, 600

Specifications
- Mass: 5.5 lb (2.5 kg)
- Length: 37.5 in (953 mm) since mid-1980s, 40.5 in (1029 mm) before mid-1980s
- Barrel length: 18 in 99M1, M2 (457 mm); 22 in (559 mm) until 1999; 19 in (483 mm) since 1999
- Cartridge: .22 LR
- Action: Direct blowback
- Rate of fire: less than 2 seconds per shot, typical
- Muzzle velocity: 1,280 ft/s (390 m/s)
- Feed system: 15 or 18 rounds; tubular magazine capacity is either 17 rounds (before the late 1980s) or 14 rounds (since the late 1980s)
- Sights: adjustable open rear, ramp front sight; receiver is grooved for a scope mount

The Marlin Model 60, also known as the Marlin Glenfield Model 60, is a semi-automatic rifle that fires the .22 LR rimfire cartridge. Produced by Remington Arms in Huntsville, Alabama formerly in Mayfield, Kentucky, formerly by Marlin Firearms Company of North Haven, Connecticut, it was in continuous production from 1960 to 2020 and the company says it is the most popular rifle of its kind in the world. Major features include a micro-groove barrel, a cross-bolt safety, hardwood stock with Monte Carlo comb, and brass or blued steel inner magazine tube. The Marlin Model 795 is a very similar rifle and based on the Marlin Model 60, changed only to accept a detachable box magazine.

== History ==
The Marlin Model 99 was developed in 1959 by Ewald Nichol. Internally, it was essentially what would become the Model 60 in 1960. However, major differences were visible from the exterior. The Model 99 featured a walnut stock, and the receiver, instead of being grooved for tip-off scope mounts like the Model 60 would be, was factory-tapped to accept screw-on scope mounts. The Model 99 was offered from 1959 through 1961, and a lower priced version, Model 99G, was offered under Marlin's Glenfield line.

The Marlin Model 60 was developed in 1960 from the Model 99 design. The primary difference was that the stock was made of birch instead of walnut to reduce the recurring production costs for the more expensive wood. Marlin also moved away from their practice of using steel inner tubes with their tubular magazine. They moved back to brass inner tubes as other companies had done. This, instead of the steel tubes often seen on earlier Marlin .22 rifles, eliminated the rust problems that the all-steel tubular magazines had experienced which helped make the inexpensive Marlin rifle as durable as more expensive .22 caliber rifles. The Model 60 additionally featured a 16-groove rifled barrel, utilizing Marlin's trademarked Micro-Groove rifling technology, which had been developed in 1953. This rifling, with its precision-crowned muzzle, gave the Model 60 an inherent, enhanced accuracy over competing rifles, which used traditional deep grooved rifling, because the bullet was not as severely deformed while traveling down the barrel, and downrange.

The Model 60 has a manual "fully open" bolt hold position, activated by pushing the charging handle inwards towards the gun when it is in the fully retracted, open breech position. To close the bolt with the manual bolt hold-open engaged, the charging handle must be pulled out, away from the gun, before the bolt will go forward. Since 1985, the Model 60 has also included a patented automatic "last-shot" bolt hold-open. This latter feature is a safety feature that locks the bolt half-way open after the last cartridge is fired, thereby allowing the safe inspection of the now-open action. This also notifies the user when the gun is empty.

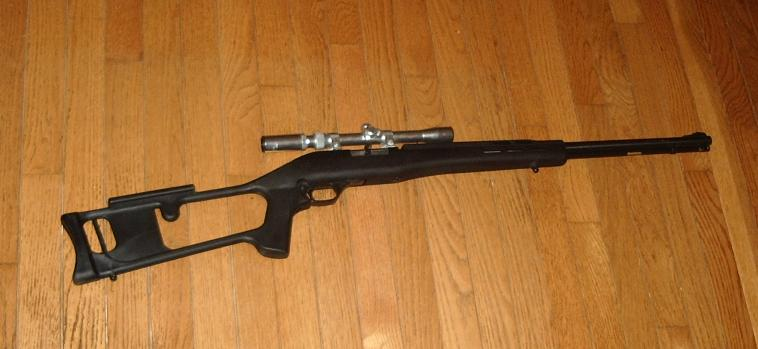
Marlin Model 60 with after-market stock.

During the late-1980s, the capacity of the rifle was reduced to a 15-round maximum limit, to meet New Jersey's firearms law for semi-automatic guns. For a few years in the mid-1980s the Model 60 rifles had both the "last shot hold open" feature and also held 18 rounds in the tube magazine. Those rifles with those two features are among the most sought after Model 60s. The redesigned magazine tube was visibly shorter than the barrel, which is how rifles from this period can be easily identified. Then, in the early 2000s the length of the barrel was reduced from 22 to 19 inches (559 to 483 mm), to match the length of the reduced length magazine. This had the effect of reducing the length of the rifle from 40.5 to 37.5 inches (1029 to 953 mm). (The photo above is of the 40.5 inch (1029 mm) version, the rifle having been manufactured in 1982.) Non-removable tubular magazine-fed rifles were never subject to the 10 round limit of the Federal Assault Weapons Ban. Marlin also manufactured models for export, which had various capacities to comply with foreign firearms regulations.

Despite slight design changes since 1960, there is general backwards compatibility of nearly all internal parts. Some notable parts that are year-specific are the feed throat mechanisms, magazine tubes, firing pins, and hammers.

In 2020 Marlin was sold to Sturm, Ruger & Co. when Remington Arms assets were sold off. Production of the Model 60 ceased at this time. Ruger relaunched Marlin in fall of 2021. As of January 2022, Ruger announced it has no plans to resume production of the Model 60.

== Features ==
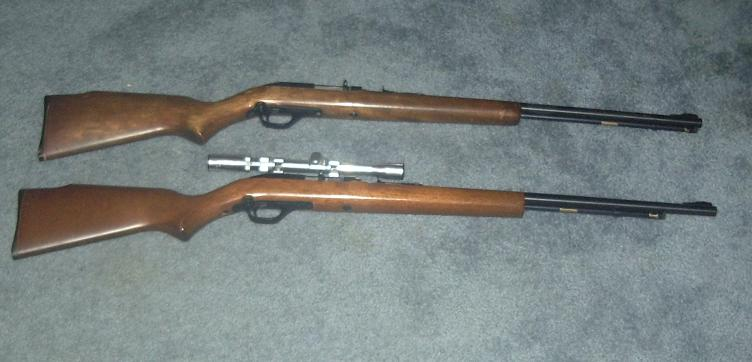
Two Marlin Model 60s. Top: older 18-round model. Bottom: 15-round model with aftermarket scope (and magazine tube that is visibly shorter than the barrel). Note: the bolt stays open on the 15-round model after the last round is fired, but does not on the 18-round model. The 15 round model has a third screw slightly behind the trigger guard to reinforce the stock, which the old model lacks. There are a few 1985 models that were a mixture of both, 22" barrel, 18 round capacity, last round bolt hold open feature and the third reinforcing screw. Different wood is used for the stock itself.Undoubtedly, the 22-inch-long model is the most expensive and the one most prized by collectors

The action design is a self-loading, straight blowback operation, with right-side ejection. The receiver top has a serrated, non-glare finish. The receiver is held in the stock by front and rear machine screws through forearm and the trigger guard respectively (later models add a wood screw behind the trigger guard to reinforce the wrist of the stock). The receiver is grooved for a scope mount. For use without a scope, the barrel features an adjustable open rear light and a ramp front sight. The charging handle is used to load the first round from the magazine and can be retracted and pushed in as a manual bolt hold-open feature. Current model has an automatic "last-shot" bolt hold-open device with an external lever in the front of the trigger guard to release the bolt. Earliest Model 60s did not have a bolt hold-open; first the manual, then in the mid-1980s the automatic "last shot" hold-open were added. The rifle has an easily accessible cross-bolt safety located above the trigger. When disassembled, the trigger guard with trigger and safety remains in the stock.

Marlin uses their proprietary Micro-Groove rifling in the Model 60. The twist rate is 1:16 inches, right-hand. Micro-Groove rifling uses 16 small lands and grooves rather than 4, 6 or 8 deeper grooves used in most rifles. This increases the accuracy of the rifle by lessening deformation of fired bullets traveling down the barrel. Although the Model 60 is one of the least expensive .22 semi-automatic rifles sold, it has the reputation of being one of the most accurate rifles out of the box, with no modifications necessary.

Unlike some competing .22 semi-automatic rifles, such as the Ruger 10/22, there are relatively few aftermarket accessories sold for the utilitarian Model 60.

The Model 60 has been sold in over thirty-five variants, and is one of the fastest-selling sporting rifles ever, as of 1983.

While earlier .22 semi-automatic rifles were often designed to function with .22 Short, .22 Long and .22 Long Rifle interchangeably, the Model 60 is optimized for the .22 Long Rifle cartridge only.

== Uses ==
The Model 60 has been used for small-game hunting and pest control, as well as for inexpensive target practice while preparing for hunting with larger rifles. The relatively large ammunition capacity is adequate for recreational target shooting ("plinking"), plus the low price and ease of handling makes it well-suited as a first rifle by young hunters just learning to use a semi-automatic rifle.

== Versions and year of manufacture ==
The Model 60 is currently available in nine distinct versions:

The production of Marlin Model 60's was moved to Huntsville, Alabama. This move took place in 2016 and 2017. Rifles now are labeled on the barrel with the new location as Huntsville, Alabama USA.

- Model 60, the basic rifle (shown in picture)
- Model 6082, US Cavalry Commemorative version issued in 1982, basic rifle
- Model 60C, the basic rifle in a camouflage version
- Model 60SN, the basic rifle with a black fiberglass stock
- Model 60SB, the rifle in a weather-proof stainless steel version
- Model 60DL, the basic rifle in a Monte Carlo walnut stock
- Model 60SS, the rifle in a nickel-plated, stainless steel version with a grey/black laminate stock
- Model 60SSK, the rifle in a nickel-plated, stainless steel version, with black fiberglass stock
- Model 60S-CF, the rifle in a nickel-plated, stainless steel version, with a black carbon-fiber-patterned stock
- Model 60DLX, the newest Marlin 60, celebrating the 50th anniversary of the Model 60. Has a premium walnut stock and gold fill on the roll marks, otherwise same as base model.

Historically, there were also other versions that were sold:

- Marlin Model 99 - this was the first version of the Model 60, offered in a walnut stock, 1959 to 1961
- Marlin Model 99DL - Deluxe model with Monte Carlo walnut stock and a butt plate end cap with white line spacer. Gold tone trigger and trigger guard, 1961 - 1964
- Marlin Model 99C - Similar to 99, but Micro Groove barrel and only trigger was gold tone. Receiver was grooved for rimfire tip off scope mounts. Originally smooth wood stock, checking was added in 1971. The pattern was changed several times later. 1961 - 1978
- Marlin Model 990 - Deluxe version of the 99C with an American walnut stock. 1979 - 1987
- Marlin Model 99G - Very similar to the 60
- Marlin Model 99M1 - styled to resemble the US Army M1 carbine, with eighteen-inch barrel, handguard, barrel band, nine-shot magazine even with the end of the stock, and receiver sight mounted on the scope grooves.
- Marlin Model 989M2 - styled like the 99M1, but with a box magazine.
- Glenfield Model 99G - precursor of the Model 60G.
- Glenfield Model 60G - Similar to the 99C, but with a birch stock instead of walnut. 1960 - 1965
- Glenfield Model 60 - one of the Model 60 versions manufactured from 1966 to 1982
- Glenfield Model 65 - manufactured in 1968; it was essentially identical to the Model 60 with the exception of a brass exterior magazine tube; it was made for Oklahoma Tire & Supply Co.
- Glenfield Model 75 - Carbine version. Shorter 18" barrel and nine shot mag tube. No bolt release lever in trigger guard. Supplied with sling swivels.
- Glenfield Model 75C - carbine version, same as the Glenfield Model 75 but the 75C has a 14+1 capacity.
- Marlin Model 120 "Revelation" - Manufactured for Western Auto Supply in the early 1960s, had a brass dot front sight instead of the hood sight, and the barrel is stamped WESTERN AUTO SUPPLY CO.
- There was a 20th Anniversary edition of the Model 60 Produced in the early 1980s by Marlin. It was sold by various retailers until stock ran out, at least until 1982.
- Marlin Model 600 - Made specially for Big 5 Sporting Goods between 1986 and 1989. This model is very rare because of the short production run, and little info is known. Came with a supremely durable gold-plated metal trigger instead of the standard polymer trigger, and a stainless steel breech bolt in lieu of the blue steel breech bolt on the Model 60.
- Model 60SSBL, the nickel-plated, stainless steel version of the M60 had a blue/grey laminate stock and was sold exclusively at Cabela's.
- Marlin Model 60W NRA 125th Anniversary Edition .22 LR. The rimfire, tube-fed, semi-automatic rifle is chambered for .22 LR only & has Micro-Groove rifling. The NRA 125th Anniversary Edition (c. 1996) featured a walnut finished stock, golden finish trigger, & golden medallion on stock stamped with 'Safety - Ethics - Sportsmanship'. Iron sights. 15-round capacity of .22 LR. 22" barrel. 5.45 lbs.

Other private-label versions were manufactured for Montgomery Ward, Coast to Coast Stores, and Cotter & Company.

== See also ==
- Marlin Firearms
- Ruger 10/22, a competing .22 caliber semi-automatic rifle, similar to the Marlin 795 which uses a box-magazine.
- Savage Model 64F, a competing .22 caliber semi-automatic rifle.
