= Clearwater River Dene Band 221 =

Indian reserve in Saskatchewan, Canada

Coordinates: 56°19′46″N 109°32′01″W

- Indian reserve
- Clearwater River Dene Band Indian Reserve No. 221
- Location in Saskatchewan
- First Nation: Clearwater River
- Country: Canada
- Province: Saskatchewan

Area
  - Total: 2,900 ha (7,200 acres)

Clearwater River Dene Band 221 is an Indian reserve of the Clearwater River Dene Nation in Saskatchewan. It is 24 kilometres (15 mi) east of La Loche.

== See also ==
- List of Indian reserves in Saskatchewan
