= Clearwater River Dene Band 222 =

Indian reserve in Saskatchewan, Canada

Coordinates: 56°32′19″N 109°27′08″W

- Indian reserve
- Clearwater River Dene Band Indian Reserve No. 222
- Location in Saskatchewan
- First Nation: Clearwater River
- Country: Canada
- Province: Saskatchewan

Area
  - Total: 5,741.4 ha (14,187 acres)

Population (2016)
  - Total: 822
  - Density: 14.3/km^{2} (37.1/sq mi)
- Community Well-Being Index: 49

Clearwater River Dene Band 222 is an Indian reserve of the Clearwater River Dene Nation in Saskatchewan. It is 11 kilometres (6.8 mi) south-west of La Loche. In the 2016 Canadian Census, it recorded a population of 822 living in 188 of its 218 total private dwellings. In the same year, its Community Well-Being index was calculated at 49 of 100, compared to 58.4 for the average First Nations community and 77.5 for the average non-Indigenous community.

== See also ==
- List of Indian reserves in Saskatchewan
