= Clearwater River Provincial Park =

Provincial park in Saskatchewan, Canada

- IUCN category Ib (wilderness area)
- Location within Saskatchewan Location within Canada
- Location: Saskatchewan, Canada
- Nearest city: La Loche, Saskatchewan, Fort McMurray, Alberta
- Coordinates: 56°53′54″N 108°58′50″W
- Area: 2,240.35 km^{2} (865.00 sq mi)
- Established: 1986
- Governing body: Sask Parks

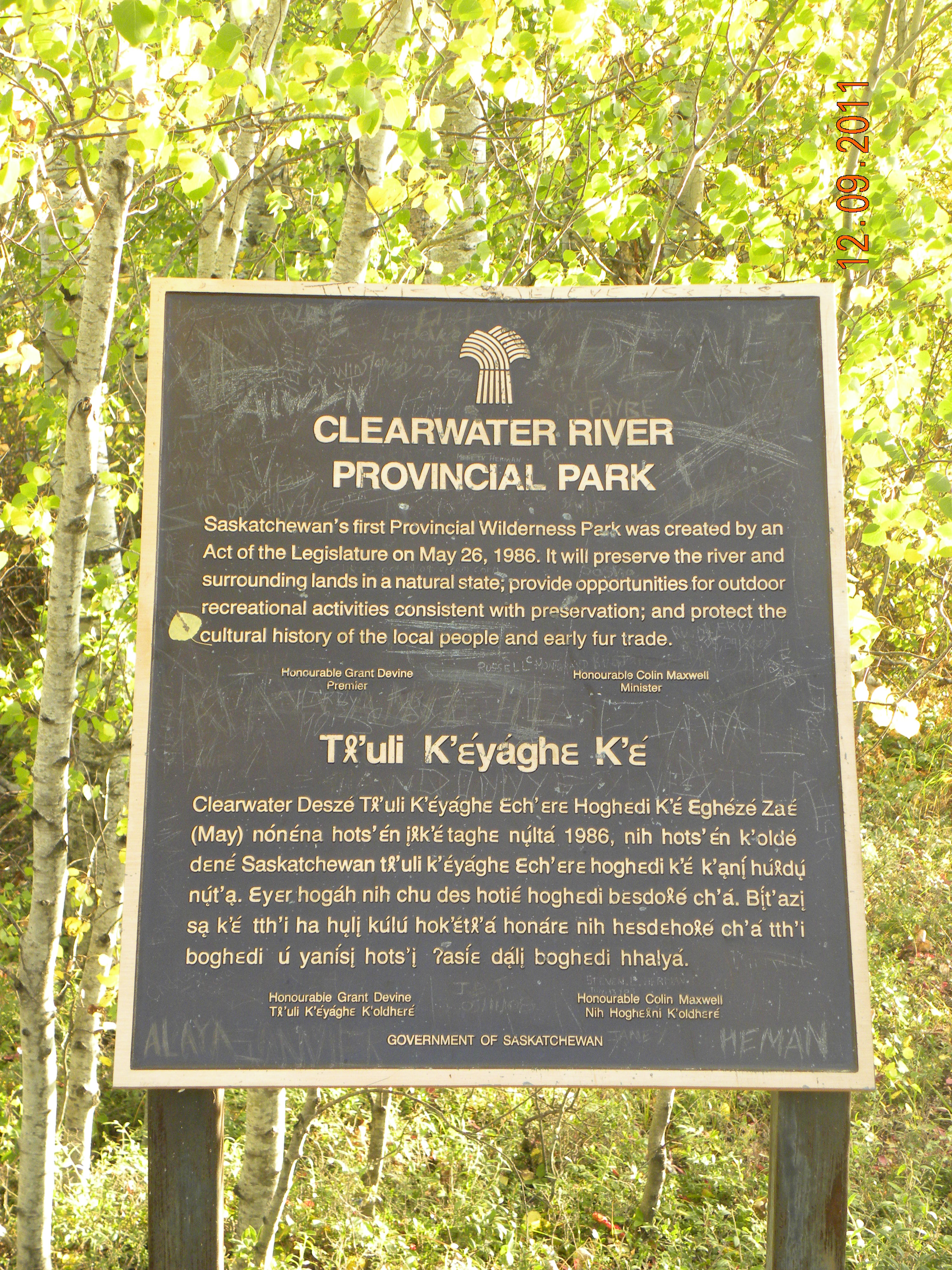
Sign at Clearwater River Provincial Park at the Highway 955

Clearwater River Provincial Park is a wilderness provincial park in the boreal forest of northern Saskatchewan, Canada. The park begins at the south end of Lloyd Lake on the Clearwater River and includes territory on both sides of the river until it reaches the Alberta border.

The park includes the historic Methye Portage (Portage La Loche). The Methye Portage was designated a National Historic Site in 1933 and the Clearwater River was designated a Canadian Heritage River in 1986 due to their historical importance in Canada.

The Clearwater River offers experienced canoeists Class 2 to Class 4 rapids.

== Park access ==
The park can be reached from La Loche by crossing to the northernmost end of Lac La Loche by boat. A stone cairn is located near the south end of the Portage.

About 65 kilometres (40 mi) north of La Loche on Highway 955 a bridge crosses the Clearwater River near Warner Rapids. The road is paved from La Loche to the Clearwater River Dene Nation turn-off (about 5 kilometres (3.1 mi)) then continues as a gravel road. On the north-east side of the bridge are 17 wilderness camp sites. There are no facilities in the park.

== See also ==
- List of protected areas of Saskatchewan
- Tourism in Saskatchewan
