= La Loche shootings =

School shooting in Saskatchewan

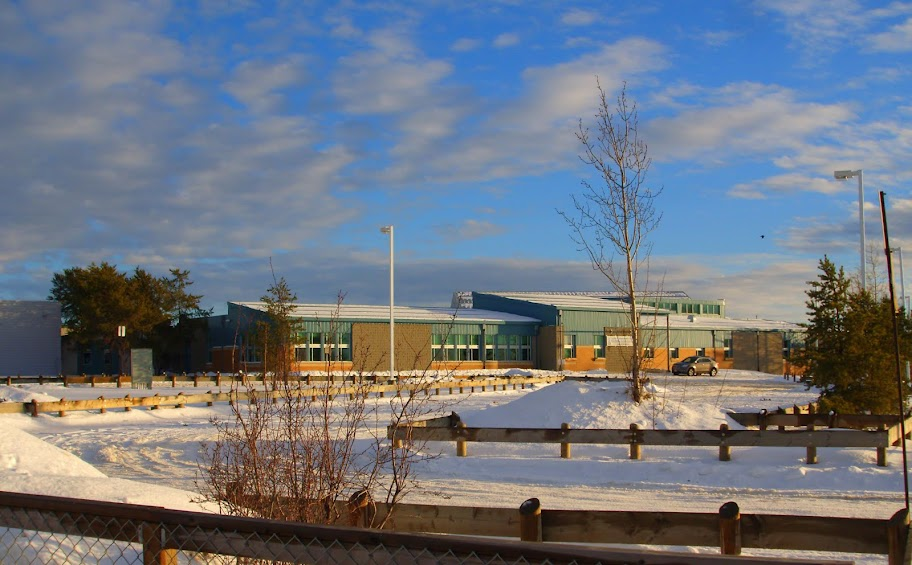
- La Loche Community School's Dene Building
- Location: 56°29′58″N 109°27′11″W (Dene Crescent); 56°29′18″N 109°26′43″W (Dene Building); La Loche, Saskatchewan, Canada
- Date: January 22, 2016; 10 years ago 1:05 p.m. – 1:16 p.m. (CST)
- Attack type: Spree shooting, school shooting, mass shooting
- Weapons: Shotgun; .22-caliber Mossberg 702 Plinkster rifle (murder of the perpetrator's cousins at their home); .30-06 caliber Remington Model 760 pump-action rifle (unused; jammed)
- Deaths: 5 (2 at the school, 2 of the perpetrator's cousins at home, 1 person died from gunshot injuries in 2023)
- Injuries: 6
- Perpetrator: Randan Dakota Fontaine
- Motive: Inconclusive
- Verdict: Life imprisonment with no chance of parole for ten years.
- Convictions: First degree murder (2 counts); Second degree murder (2 counts); Attempted murder (7 counts)

On January 22, 2016, four people were killed and seven others injured in a shooting spree in La Loche, Saskatchewan, Canada. Two brothers were killed at their home, and two teachers were killed at the Dene Building of the La Loche Community School. A fifth victim died in 2023. A 17-year-old male suspect was apprehended and placed into custody.

== Shootings ==
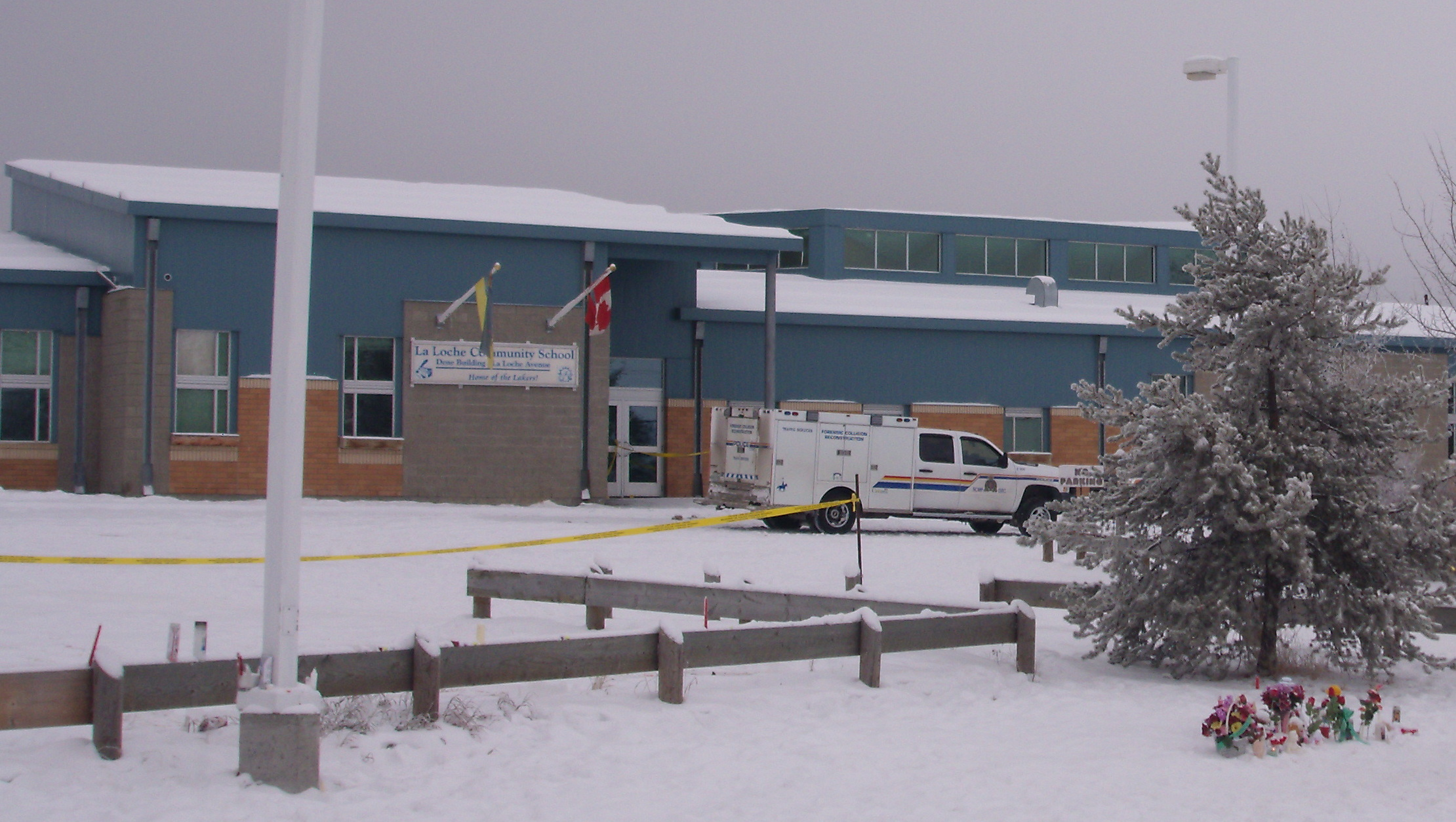
Dene Building on January 24

According to police, the shootings began at a residence in the 300 block of Dene Crescent, where the suspect shot two of his cousins some time before 1:00 p.m. He shot the first cousin 11 times with a .22 rifle and then went outside to the truck he would use to drive to the school. Outside, he encountered his second cousin, lured him into the house, and shot him twice. He then went to La Loche Community School's Dene Building (Note: The Dene Building houses grades 7 through 12 and is sometimes referred to as Dene High School.) and began firing at around 1:05, shortly before lunch ended, reportedly with a shotgun. He fired at least six or seven shots inside the building, killing a teacher and an assistant and wounding seven others. The school shooting lasted for about eight minutes.

Between 1:08 and 1:10, a suspect with a gun was spotted by a responding officer, who chased him through the building and eventually arrested him outside at 1:15. Afterwards, police were notified of the bodies at the residence on Dene Crescent. Both the Dene Building and the elementary school were put on lockdown during the shooting. The suspect had reportedly posted his intentions on Facebook.

Of about 350 enrolled students, around 150 were at school at the time, since many had taken final exams that morning and had no further classes.

=== Murders of Dayne and Drayden Fontaine ===
On the morning of January 22, 2016, Randan Fontaine went to school with his two cousins, Dayne and Drayden. While at school, he looked up the Columbine shooters and their weapons on his iPhone. He also talked with a teacher about his poor grades in class. At around noon, Fontaine and his cousins went to their own homes for lunch. Fontaine ate his lunch at his adoptive mother's house before going to his grandparents' house.

At the house, Fontaine went to the basement and entered Dayne's bedroom. He grabbed a Mossberg International .22 calibre rifle. At the time, Dayne and Fontaine were the only people in the home. Fontaine went to Drayden's bedroom while carrying the rifle. Fontaine called out to Dayne to come to the basement. As Dayne entered the basement, Fontaine raised the rifle and shot Dayne. Dayne ran up the stairs as Fontaine followed him, repeatedly shooting him in the back. Dayne fell down in the kitchen and Fontaine walked up to him, firing a shot to his head as he begged for his life. Dayne died on the kitchen floor. Fontaine went back to the basement to grab a .30-06 caliber Remington Model 760 pump-action rifle. However, the gun jammed as he tried to load it. After putting down the rifle, Fontaine decided to grab a shotgun and gathered ammunition for the weapon. He also stole the keys to his aunt's truck and shut off Dayne's phone.

Fontaine exited the house and hid the shotgun in the back of his aunt's truck. Drayden, who was outside, ran up to the truck and asked Fontaine for a ride back to the school. He also asked Fontaine where Dayne was. Fontaine told Drayden to follow him and ran into the house. He grabbed the Mossberg .22 rifle he used to murder Dayne and called out to Drayden from upstairs. As Drayden went upstairs, Fontaine shot him twice in the head, killing him. Fontaine left the house and hid Drayden and Dayne's shoes to make sure no one could see them from outside. He entered his aunt's truck and drove to the school. In total, Fontaine fired 17 shots at his two cousins with the .22 rifle, only missing 4 of the shots.

=== Dene High School shooting ===
On the way to school, Fontaine accessed Facebook Messenger from his phone. He sent several messages to a group chat, confessing that he killed his two cousins. He also told the group chat that he was going to shoot up the school.

At 1:02 p.m., Fontaine drove onto the school parking lot. He briefly parked for a few seconds before driving up near the front entrance of the school. Fontaine parked the truck in front of the entrance and entered the school unarmed at 1:04 p.m. He looked around the common area before exiting the school. Fontaine returned to the truck to retrieve the shotgun.

At 1:05 p.m., Fontaine walked towards the school building while carrying the shotgun. Several students in the main entrance foyer and the common area ran away upon seeing Fontaine outside. Teacher Adam Wood ran into the main office to call 911. As Fontaine entered the main entrance foyer, he began opening fire. Fontaine shot and injured three students at the main entrance foyer.

At 1:06 p.m., Fontaine entered the common area and fired twice at the school's assistant principal, Phylis Longobardi, hitting her once. Longobardi ran into a classroom and called the police. Fontaine then fired a shot through the main entrance and wounded a female student who was outside the school. Fontaine briefly walked around the common area before firing a shot through a window to the assistant principal's office. He entered the main office and encountered Adam Wood. Fontaine shot Wood twice, mortally wounding him. Fontaine left the office and began walking around the school, checking for unlocked classrooms.

At 1:07:43 p.m., Fontaine fired a shot through a door window of a classroom. The shot hit teacher Charlene Klyne in the face, neck, and chest as she was sitting on her desk. Teacher's assistant Marie Janvier began helping Klyne. Fontaine walked away from the classroom briefly before returning at 1:08:24 p.m. He fired a second shot through the window, killing Marie Janvier and further injuring Charlene Klyne. Klyne would die from complications related to her injuries seven years later. Fontaine walked away from the classroom again.

For about a minute, Fontaine wandered the halls of the school. He eventually encountered a teacher who had just opened a classroom door. The teacher recognized Fontaine and thought he wasn't the shooter. She told him to hide with her before seeing the shotgun. She immediately closed the door and locked it. Fontaine spared the teacher. Just after encountering the teacher, Fontaine noticed a student running in the hallway. Fontaine began chasing after the student. The student was able to jump downstairs and exit the school out of a side door. Fontaine also reached the side door and opened it before walking back upstairs. The student escaped unharmed. After walking back upstairs, Fontaine turned towards a classroom and fired a shot through the door window. The shot hit a teacher in the back. Fontaine returned to the common area.

At the common area, Fontaine paced between the common area and the main entrance foyer. He looked outside through the doors before re-entering the common area. Fontaine proceeded to shoot at a large display case in the common area. He pulled out his phone and briefly looked at it before throwing it to the ground.

At 1:11:55 p.m., a police officer entered the school. Fontaine noticed the officer and ran into a women's restroom at 1:12:10 p.m. Over the next three minutes, several more police officers arrived to look for the shooter. Fontaine would eventually be seen by police leaving the women's restroom unarmed. As he exited the restroom, Fontaine announced: "I'm the shooter". He was arrested at 1:16 p.m.

As he was arrested, Fontaine told officers about leaving the shotgun against a sink counter. He also told the officers about how he considered committing suicide before abandoning the idea. In the women's restroom, police found the shotgun with only one live shell inside. As he was being dragged out, Fontaine would assist officers by pointing out his cell phone on the floor and telling them to check his house. When police asked why, Fontaine responded: "my brothers".

=== Victims ===
The deceased were identified as brothers Dayne, 17, and Drayden Fontaine, 13; and teachers Adam Jacob Wood, 35, and Marie Jacqueline Janvier, 21. Janvier and the Fontaine brothers died at the scene, and Wood died later in the local hospital. Seven other people were injured. The four most seriously wounded were flown to and hospitalized at Royal University Hospital in Saskatoon. All were in critical condition two days after the shootings, according to an official in the Saskatchewan government. On January 27, an official said three had been released. A fourth was released on February 12. On May 17, 2023, one of the injured victims, Charlene Klyne, a teacher, died of her injuries from the shooting, according to her family. Her shotgun wounds had left un-removable pellets in her, rendered her nearly completely blind, and had paralyzed her vocal cords, which eventually lead to her asphyxiating.

== Perpetrator ==
Police did not release the name of the suspect at the time, as he was protected by a publication ban as required by Canada's Youth Criminal Justice Act. Police said he was a student at the school and that he was 17. On the day of the attack, he was 15 days away from turning 18. According to friends, he was bullied at school for his appearance. After the Supreme Court of Canada appeal, the publication ban was lifted revealing his name to be Randan Dakota Fontaine. After the publication ban was lifted, his court statement gave no rationale for his attack, and Fontaine repeatedly denied he was bullied. He has Fetal alcohol spectrum disorder, low IQ, disliked school work, and was upset about how, at the time of the attack, he was attempting to pass 10th grade for the 3rd time.

== Reactions and aftermath ==
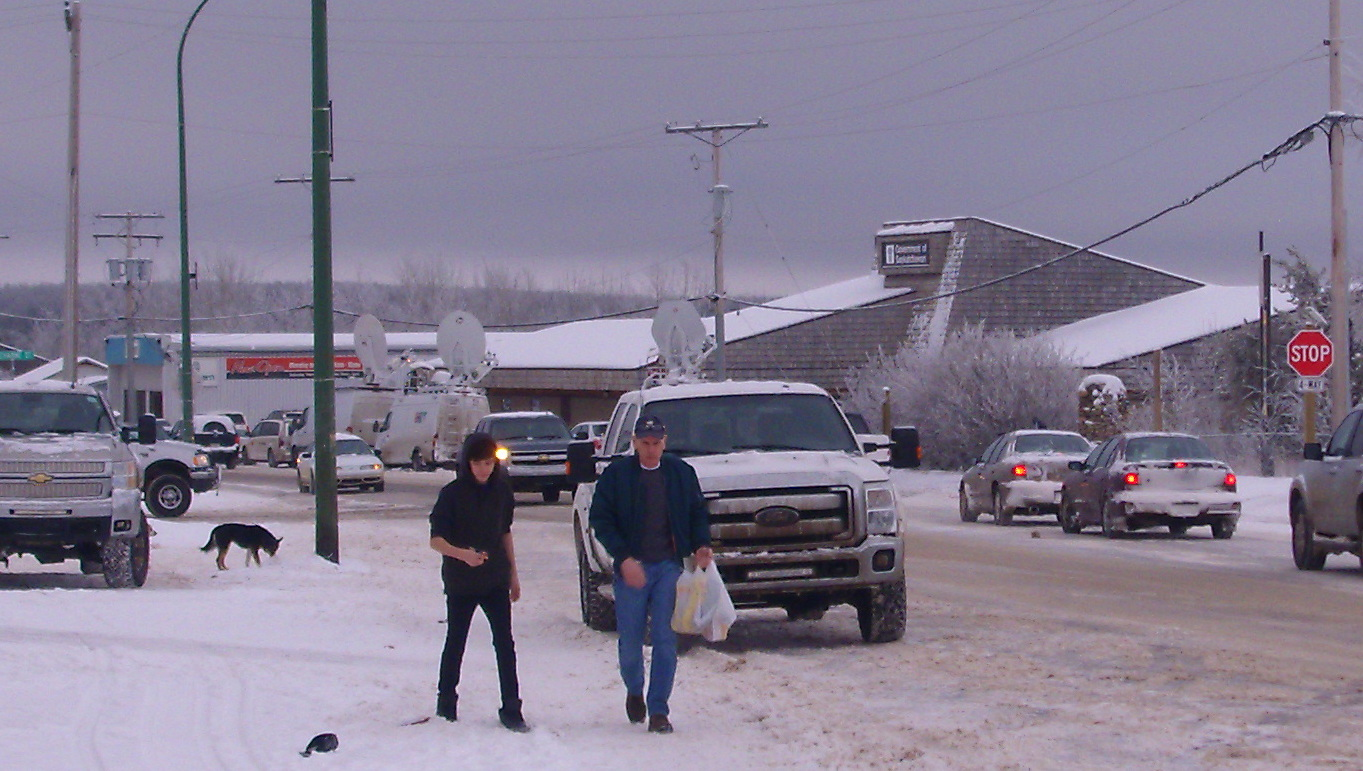
Media vehicles on La Loche Avenue

Canadian Prime Minister Justin Trudeau, Saskatchewan Premier Brad Wall, U.S. Ambassador to Canada Bruce Heyman and other Canadian politicians issued statements expressing their condolences and shock at the shooting. Wall pledged counselling support and to cover costs for those travelling to see the hospitalized victims in Saskatoon. Kevin Janvier, (Note: Marie Janvier's father was also named Kevin Janvier but was a different person.) the acting mayor of La Loche, and Georgina Jolibois, MP for the Desnethé—Missinippi—Churchill River electoral district, called to have the school torn down and rebuilt in light of the trauma caused by the shootings.

On January 23, prior to a hockey game at the Air Canada Centre, the Toronto Maple Leafs and Montreal Canadiens had a minute of silence for the victims.

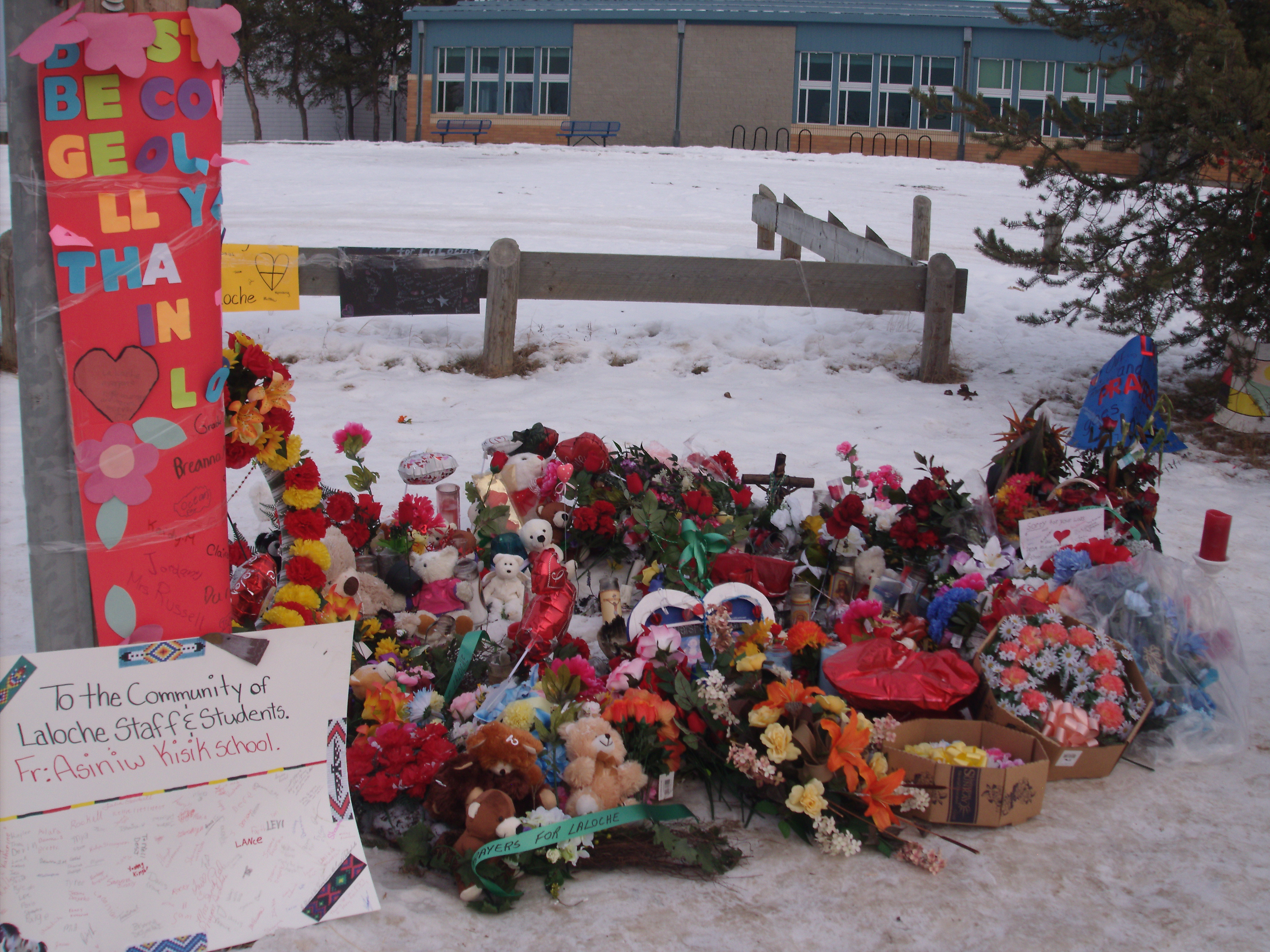
Flowers at the Dene Building

RCMP Superintendent Grant St. Germaine called the incident the worst shooting tragedy in Canadian history at a high school or elementary school. Reuters reported that it was the worst Canadian school shooting since the École Polytechnique massacre of 1989, in which fourteen were killed. (Note: Four were killed and one wounded at the Concordia University massacre in 1992.)

Classes at La Loche Community School were suspended immediately after the shooting. On January 26, the local school board, Northern Lights School Division No. 113, told parents the school would reopen in seven to ten more days, though the reopening was postponed to at least February 22. Plans to tear down the school were considered, but not passed. It said that it was willing to implement a security program at that time, following community discussion on what that should entail. In the meantime, the elementary school building remains open for students to gather, receive counselling, and play floor hockey. Exams for the first semester were cancelled for students who had not taken them on the morning of the shootings.

On January 29, Trudeau and Wall visited La Loche, where the former met with community leaders. Earlier that morning, a moment of silence was held in schools located across Saskatchewan.

In January 2017, the former principal of Columbine High School, Frank DeAngelis, who wrote a book about his experiences on trauma and healing in the aftermath of the Columbine High School massacre, visited La Loche and advised La Loche's school principal, Greg Hatch, and the other staff members about hope.

== Legal proceedings ==
On January 23, the suspect was charged with four counts of first-degree murder, seven counts of attempted murder, and one count of unauthorized possession of a firearm. Two days later, he was arraigned in a provincial court in Meadow Lake, then remanded to a youth facility. As of August 2016, the suspect had appeared in court seven times and his next court date was scheduled for October 28. Authorities have stated that they would like to sentence him as an adult if he is convicted. On October 28, 2016, the teen pleaded guilty to two counts of first degree murder, two counts of second degree murder and seven counts of attempted murder. On May 8, 2018, the gunman was sentenced to life imprisonment with no chance of parole for 10 years. On October 31, 2019, the Saskatchewan Court of Appeal upheld his conviction and adult sentence. On April 16, 2020, the Supreme Court of Canada refused leave to appeal his conviction and sentence. As a result, he has exhausted all of his legal appeals.

== See also ==
- List of massacres in Canada
- List of attacks related to secondary schools
