= Saskatchewan Highway 955 =

Provincial highway in Saskatchewan, Canada

Highway 955
- Semchuk Trail

Route information
- Maintained by Ministry of Highways and Infrastructure
- Length: 245 km (152 mi)
- Existed: 1979–present
- History: Formerly part of Hwy 155

Major junctions
- South end: Highway 155 in La Loche
- North end: Cluff Lake mine

Location
- Country: Canada
- Province: Saskatchewan

Highway system
- Provincial highways in Saskatchewan
← Highway 954	→ Highway 956

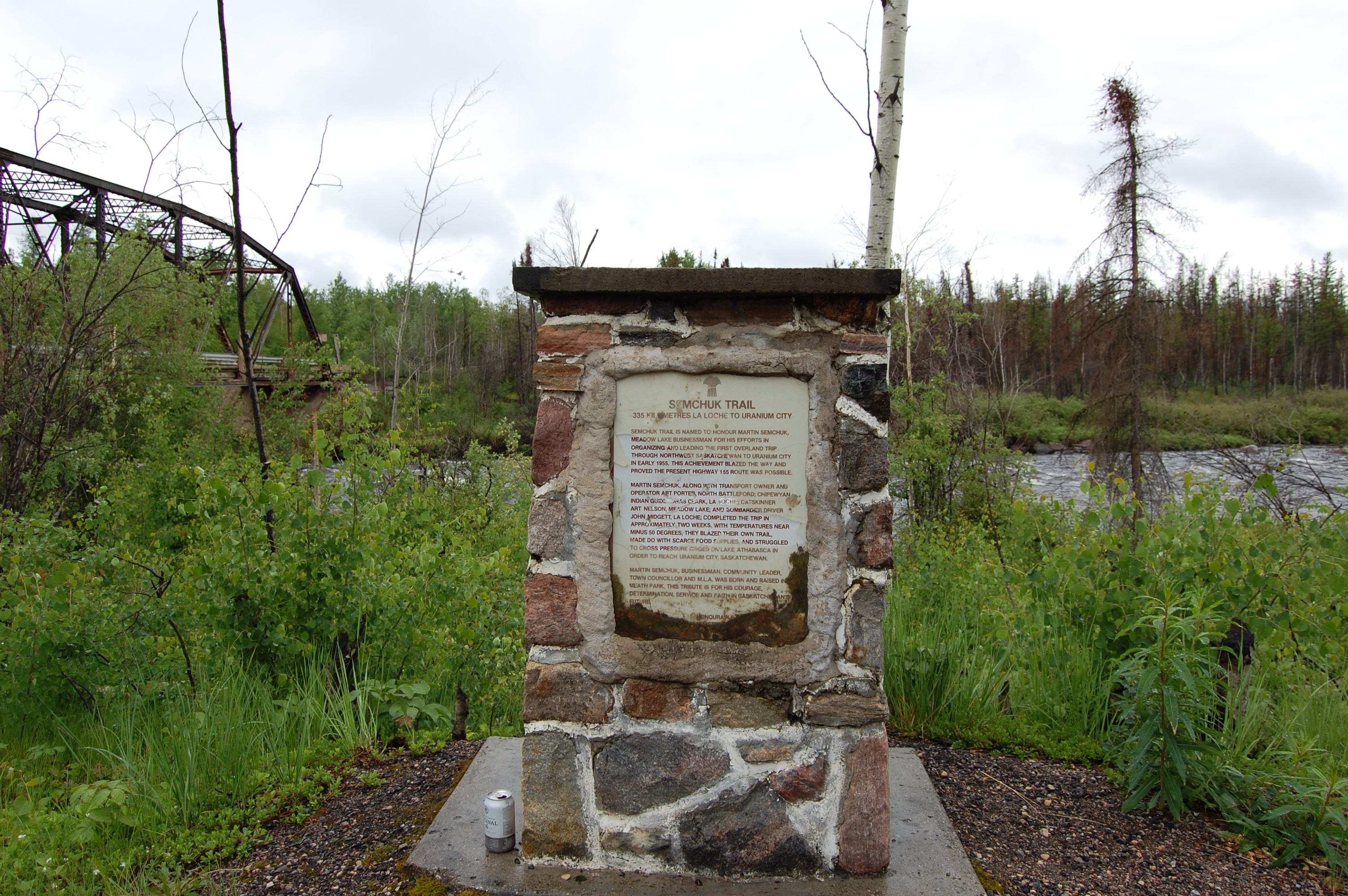
Highway 955 crosses Clearwater River

Highway 955, also known as Semchuk Trail, is a provincial highway in the Canadian province of Saskatchewan. It runs from Highway 155 near the village of La Loche at Lac La Loche to Cluff Lake mine. The mine has been closed since the early 2000s and its adjacent airstrip is also closed now, meaning there are no formal services (such as gas stations) at the northern turn-around point. Drivers using the route need to carry extra fuel and other supplies, including spare tires owing to the sharp gravel used on the road. The name "Semchuk Trail" comes from Martin Semchuk who, along with John F. Midgett, and Jonas Clarke, were involved in building the original trail in 1955–56.

Highway 955 is approximately 245 kilometres (152 mi) long and is almost entirely unpaved. A 4.5-kilometre (2.8 mi) section is paved from La Loche to the Clearwater River Dene Nation. From there a paved access road leads to the First Nations village of Clearwater.

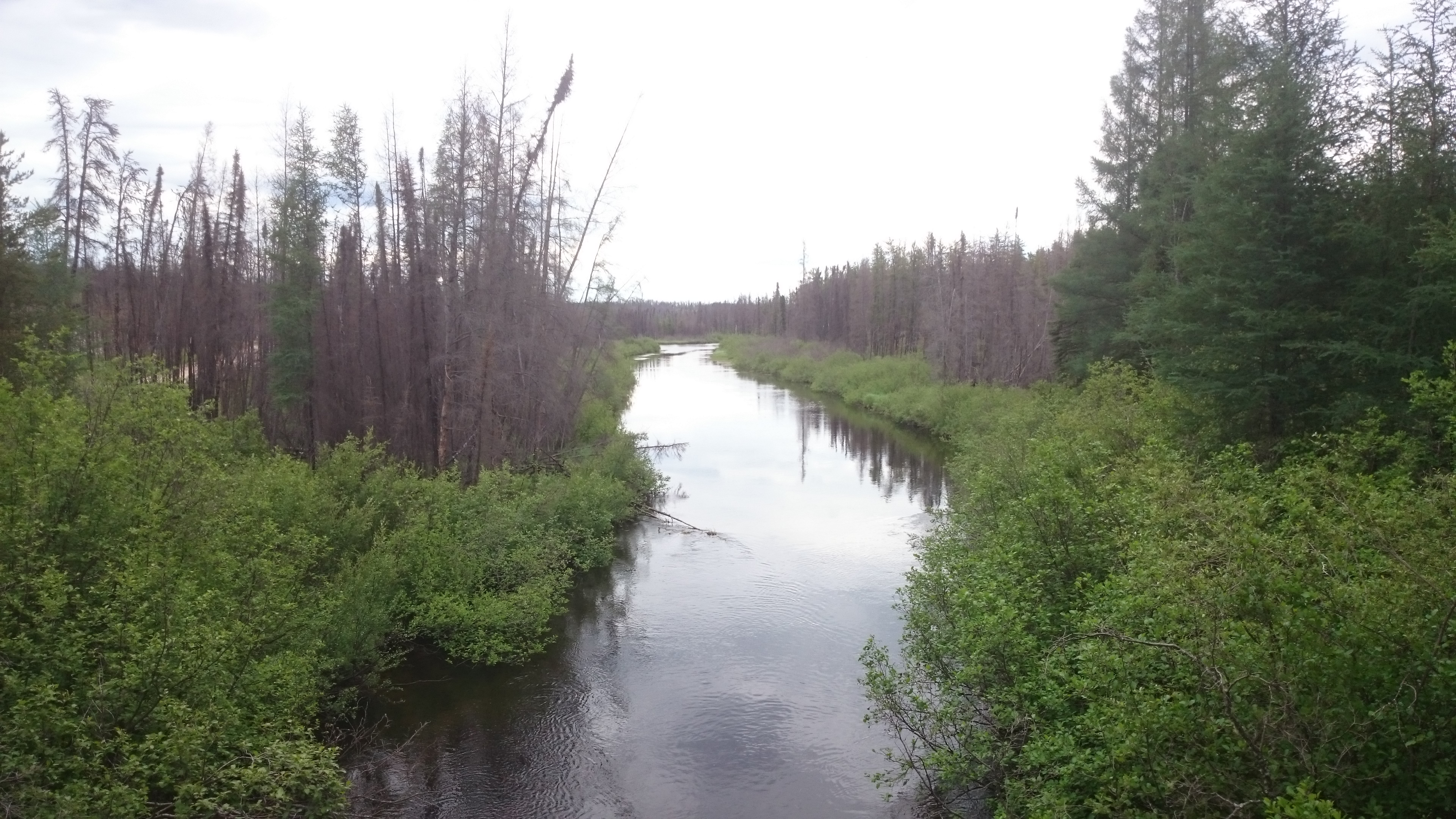
Douglas River as seen from the Highway 955 bridge

Highway 955 has nearly no intersections with other roads due to its northern location. About one-third of the way to Cluff Lake mine, there is an access road to Descharme Lake. According to provincial road maps dating from the early 1980s, a seasonal / winter road at one point continued north from Cluff Lake to the shore of Lake Athabasca and then across the lake towards Uranium City, but this appears to no longer be in use.

Highway 955 passes through Clearwater River Provincial Park. It is also the closest roadway to the Carswell structure, the largest astrobleme in Saskatchewan at 35 kilometres (22 mi) in diameter. Highway 955 traverses the Douglas River. This large valley is the Carswell meteor impact rim. Uranium is mined at three sites along the perimeter of the Carswell structure near the terminal end of Highway 955.

Highway 955 was originally part of Highway 155, but was renumbered in the early 1980s as part of the establishment of the 900-series highways.

== See also ==
- Roads in Saskatchewan
- Transportation in Saskatchewan
