= Descharme Lake, Saskatchewan =

Northern settlement in Saskatchewan, Canada

Coordinates: 57.108725°N 109.21967°W

Location of Descharme Lake in Saskatchewan

Descharme Lake is a northern settlement on Descharme Lake in the boreal forest of northwest Saskatchewan. A 10-kilometre (6.2 mi) access road leads west to the community from the Saskatchewan Highway 955 turn-off 87 km (54 miles) north of La Loche. The northern settlement is an unincorporated community in the Northern Saskatchewan Administration District.

== History ==
Across the lake from Descharme where the Descharme River flows to the Clearwater River is the old town site of Descharme. In the 1950s it had a filleting plant and a store.

In 1974, Descharme had 48 people with no facilities and no road. An unpaved road has since been constructed linking the community with Secondary Highway 955.

Most of the residents have been encouraged to relocate to the town of La Loche. In 2013, 42 people remained in the community.

Descharme may be the last of the old winter camps used by the Dene residents of La Loche.

=== Swan Lake ===
Descharme Lake was once known as Swan Lake. The community of Swan Lake is mentioned as one of the mission villages of La Loche in 1895. It was then the main winter hunting camp for the residents of La Loche with a small permanent population of 25 people and a winter population of 50. Father Penard of the La Loche Mission wrote in 1895: "at the end of about 25 leagues (75 miles from La Loche), we arrive at Swan Lake. If we are expected, we would find about 50 people, if not we would have to get them from the vicinity, perhaps up to 20 leagues (60 miles) from there, somewhere in the woods."(translation)

"Des charmes" means beautiful or charming place in French. The date of the name change from Swan Lake to Descharme Lake was made in 1944. Swan Lake was the name used in a 1943 newspaper article.

Swan Lake had 18 people in three families in the 1906 Census.

== Demographics ==
In the 2021 Census of Population conducted by Statistics Canada, Descharme Lake had a population of 26 living in 13 of its 13 total private dwellings, a change of 420% from its 2016 population of 5. With a land area of 0.24 km^{2} (0.093 sq mi), it had a population density of 108.3/km^{2} (280.6/sq mi) in 2021.

== See also ==
- List of communities in Northern Saskatchewan
- List of communities in Saskatchewan
