= La Loche Community School =

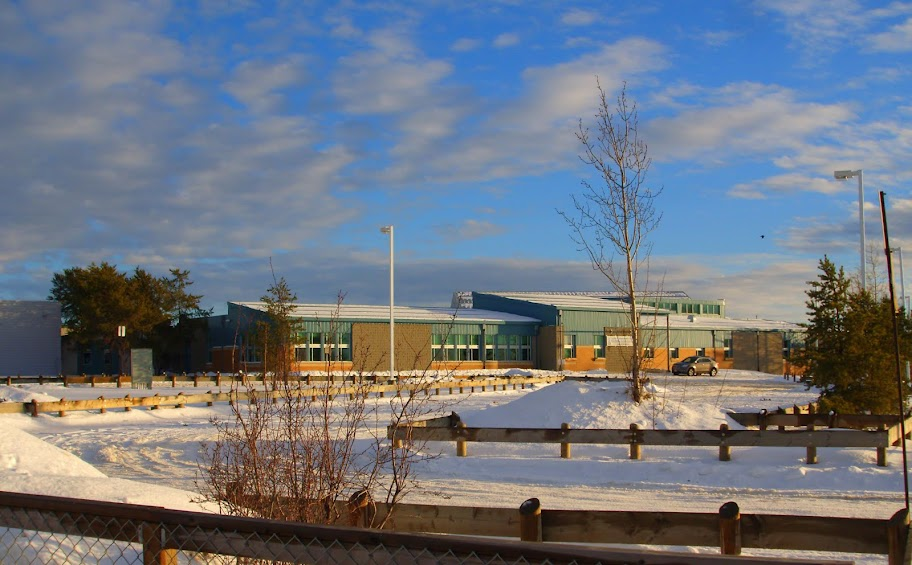
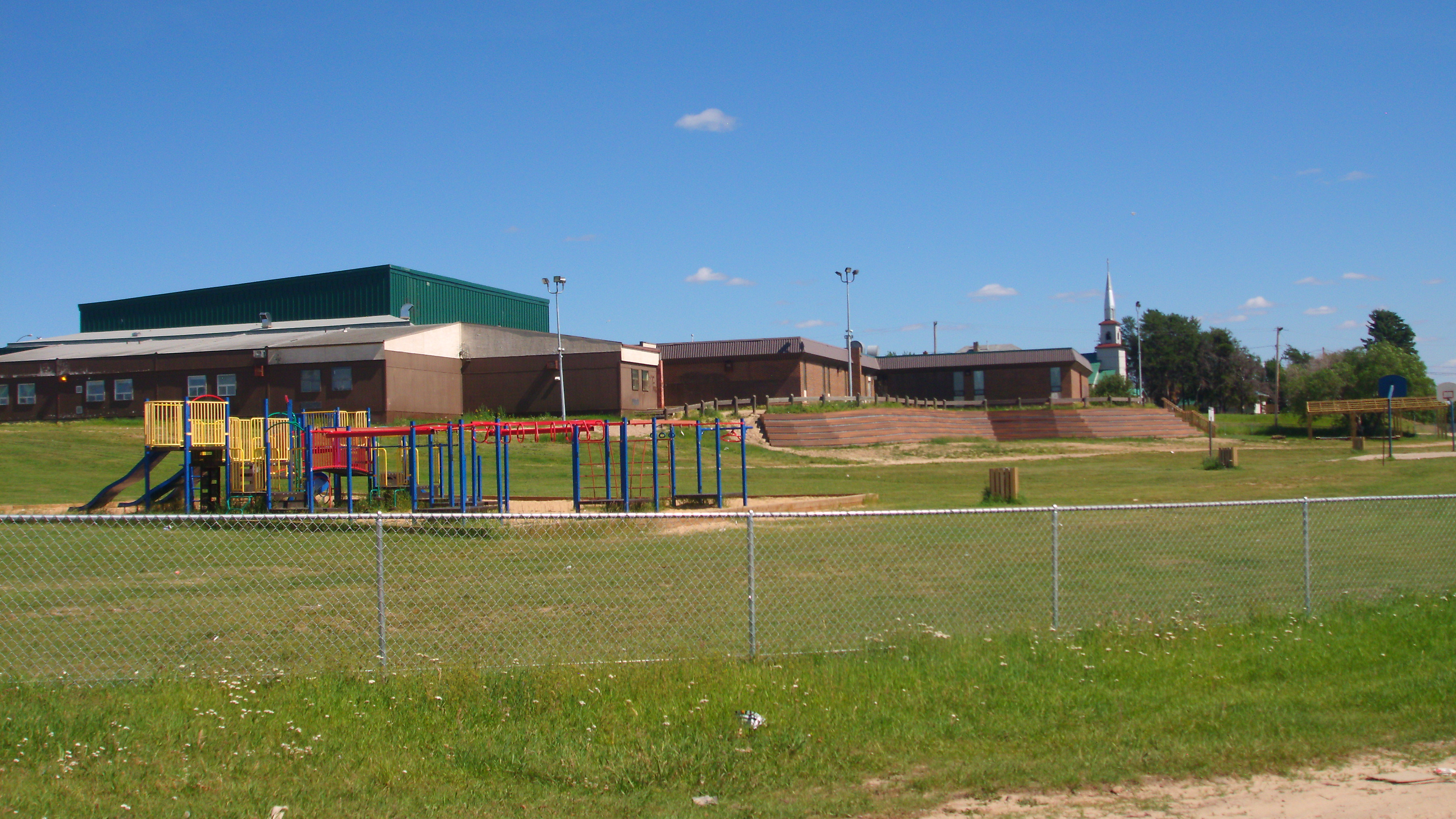
- Dene High School Ducharme School
- La Loche, Saskatchewan, S0M 1G0; Canada

Information
- School type: Public
- Founded: 1941
- School board: Northern Lights School Division #113
- Principal: Stephen King
- Staff: 110
- Grades: K-12
- Enrollment: 900
- Language: English
- Colours: Yellow and purple
- Team name: La Loche Lakers
- Website: www.nlsd113.org/dene

La Loche Community School is located in the village of La Loche in northern Saskatchewan, Canada. The school consists of two campuses. One campus, Ducharme School (56°28′56″N 109°26′18″W), offers kindergarten to grade six; and the other, Dene High School (56°29′18″N 109°26′43″W), offers grades seven to twelve. The school has an enrollment of 900 students and a support staff of 110.

The majority of the students are bilingual and speak both Denesuline and English.

== History ==
=== Ducharme School ===
The first school of La Loche was a one-room whitewashed log building set on a loose stone foundation. It was built by Aime Janvier and Little Joe Montgrand in 1940 by the lake on the grounds of the present Ducharme School. The first teacher in 1941 was Peter Klotz, followed by Alex Sebulskey in 1942 and Sister Therese Arcand s.g.m. in 1943. Called the La Loche Community Day School, this school had 23 students in 1942 and 47 students in 1944.

Another school built in 1946 had two classrooms. Another classroom was added in 1951, then another in 1960. In 1949, the school had 80 students and in 1960 the school had 112 students.

A new seven classroom school built in 1964 was named Ducharme School in honour of Father Jean-Baptiste Ducharme O.M.I. Father Ducharme, who was fluent in French, English, and Denesuline, had served the La Loche Mission from 1916 to 1951. He taught basic school courses including Dene syllabics and catechism in the rectory until the first school was built. This Ducharme School had grades one to eight with up to 180 students in daily attendance.

In 1968, Ducharme School had twelve classrooms with 340 students and 12 teachers. The school did not have running water, washrooms or showers until 1971. In the 1971–1972 school year there were 440 students.

=== Dene High School ===
In 1974, only two schools in northern Saskatchewan offered a grade 12 education. When Dene High School was built in 1979, students no longer had to leave the village to complete their high school education. High school students from the nearby villages of Clearwater River and Turnor Lake attended Dene High School until their schools were able to offer a complete high school program.

=== 2016 shooting ===
On January 22, 2016, a shooting occurred at the school. A teacher and an assistant were shot dead, and several other people were injured, allegedly by a 17-year-old male student. According to police, he had shot dead two brothers, 13 and 17, said to be his cousins, prior to the school shooting. The suspect has been charged with multiple counts of first-degree murder and attempted murder.

== Activities ==
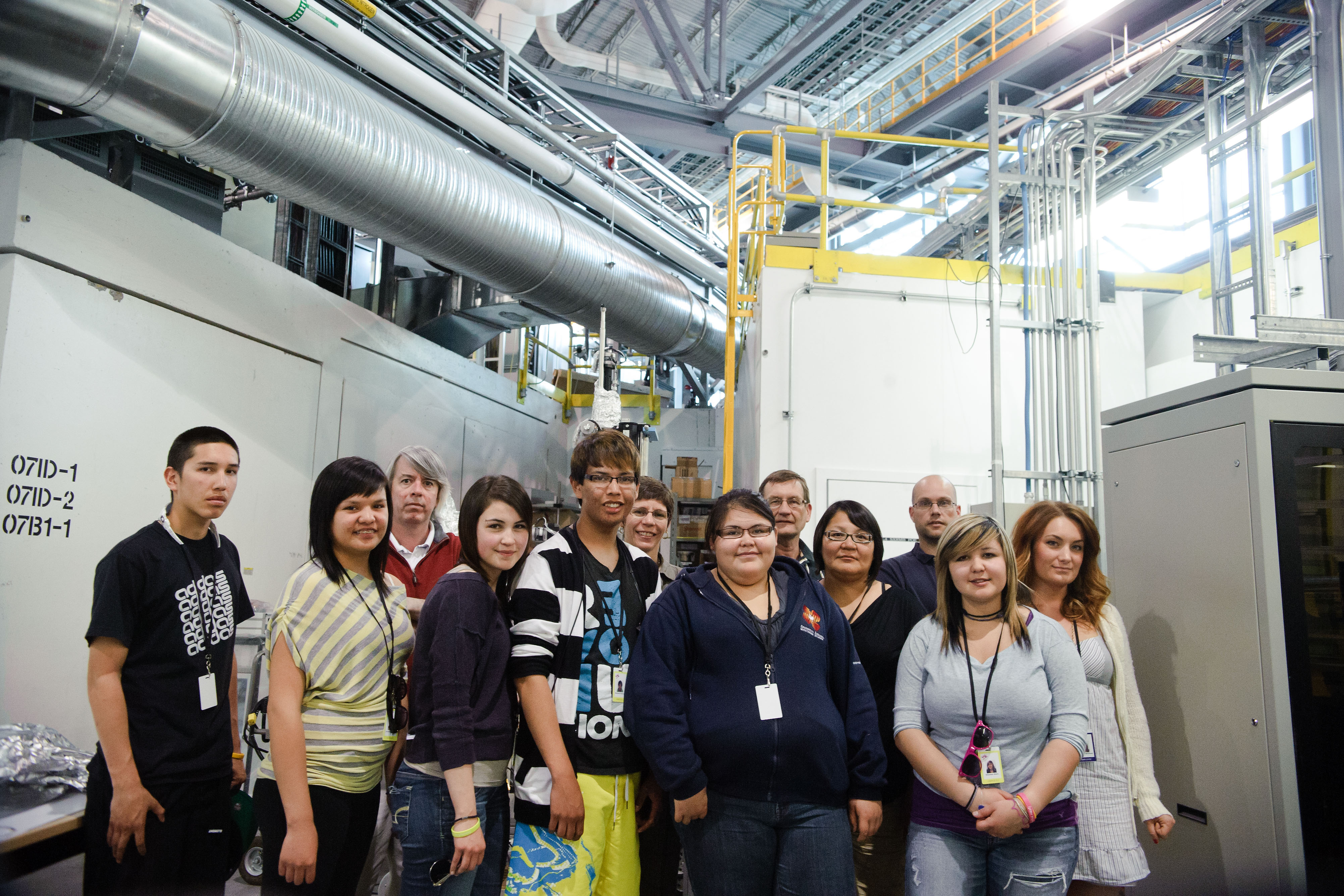
Students from La Loche Community School at the synchrotron in Saskatoon

Students from the school have taken part in an educational program at the Canadian Light Source synchrotron in Saskatoon on two occasions, looking at the effects of acid rain on the local environment. In May 2012, La Loche Community School students became the first to use the purpose-built educational beamline at the synchrotron.

== Athletics ==
In 1983, the La Loche Community School Senior Boys basketball team won the Saskatchewan provincial 2A basketball championship, defeating Maple Creek Composite School 76–44 in Saskatoon. The championship was notable given the remote location of La Loche, which required the team to travel several hours to play all their games in opponent schools.

== Notable alumni ==
- Georgina Jolibois was elected to represent the riding of Desnethé—Missinippi—Churchill River in the House of Commons of Canada in the 2015 Canadian federal election.
