= Clearwater River Dene Band 223 =

Indian reserve in Saskatchewan, Canada

Coordinates: 56°03′44″N 108°42′38″W

- Indian reserve
- Clearwater River Dene Band Indian Reserve No. 223
- Location in Saskatchewan
- First Nation: Clearwater River
- Country: Canada
- Province: Saskatchewan

Area
  - Total: 869.7 ha (2,149 acres)

Population (2016)
  - Total: 35
  - Density: 4.0/km^{2} (10/sq mi)

Clearwater River Dene Band 223 is an Indian reserve of the Clearwater River Dene Nation in Saskatchewan. It is 24 kilometres (15 mi) north-west of Buffalo Narrows on the shores of Taylor Lake. In the 2016 Canadian Census, it recorded a population of 35 living in 10 of its 11 total private dwellings.

== See also ==
- List of Indian reserves in Saskatchewan
