= Taylor Lake (Saskatchewan) =

Lake in Saskatchewan, Canada

- Location in Saskatchewan Taylor Lake (Canada)
- Location: Northern Administration District, Saskatchewan
- Coordinates: 56.0583°N 108.7046°W
- Part of: Churchill River drainage basin
- Basin countries: Canada
- Surface area: 317 ha (780 acres)
- Shore length^{1}: 12 km (7.5 mi)
- Settlements: None
- ^{1} Shore length is not a well-defined measure.

Taylor Lake is a lake in the Canadian province of Saskatchewan. The lake is in boreal forest surrounded by spruce and pine trees and muskeg. Taylor Lake is adjacent to Peter Pond Lake, about 28 kilometres (17 mi) north of Buffalo Narrows.

The northern part of Taylor Lake cuts through the Clearwater River Dene Band 223 Indian reserve and at the southern end of the lake is a provincial recreation site. Access is from Highway 155. Northern pike and walleye are fish commonly found in the lake.

== Taylor Lake Recreation Site ==
Taylor Lake Recreation Site (56.0438°N 108.6709°W) is a leased provincial campground with 13 free rustic campsites at the southern end of Taylor Lake. There is also a picnic area, pit toilets, a boat launch, and a beach.

== See also ==
- List of lakes of Saskatchewan
- Tourism in Saskatchewan
