= La Loche =

Village in Saskatchewan, Canada

- Northern village
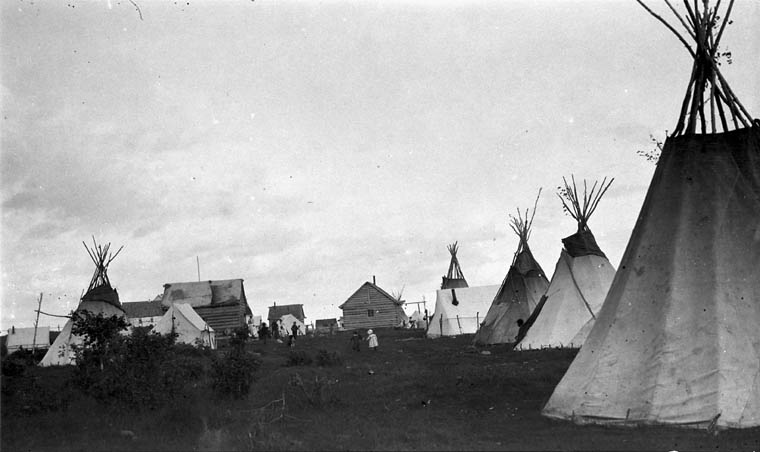
- The 1918 summer gathering in La Loche

- Location of La Loche La Loche (Canada)
- Coordinates: 56°29′N 109°26′W
- Country: Canada
- Province: Saskatchewan
- District: Northern Saskatchewan Administration District
- Census division: 18
- HBC post: 1810
- Mission founded: 1860
- Post office established: 1926
- Named for: Burbot

Government
  - Mayor: Lyle Herman
  - Village administrator: Martha Morin
  - Governing body: La Loche Town Council
  - MLA Athabasca: Leroy Laliberte
  - MP Desnethé—Missinippi—Churchill River: Buckley Belanger

Area
  - Total: 15.59 km^{2} (6.02 sq mi)

Population (2016)
  - Total: 2,827
  - Density: 181.3/km^{2} (470/sq mi)
- Time zone: UTC−06:00 (CST)
- Postal code: S0M 1G0
- Area code: 306
- Highways: Highway 155 / Highway 955 / Highway 956

La Loche (/lə lɒʃ/) is a village in northwest Saskatchewan. It is located at the end of Highway 155 on the eastern shore of Lac La Loche in Canada's boreal forest. La Loche had a population of 2,827 in 2016 and is within the Northern Saskatchewan Administration District.

Bordering La Loche to the north and reached via Highway 955 is the Clearwater River Dene Nation (CRDN) with a population of 822 people. The La Loche/CRDN population centre with 3,649 people represents about 30 percent of the Denesuline speakers of Canada. The Denesuline language is spoken by 89% of the residents.

The northern hamlet of Black Point lies on the southern shore of the lake and is accessible via the Garson Lake Road Highway 956. This road ends in Garson Lake. From there a winter road is built every year to Fort McMurray, Alberta.

Located on the northern end of Lac La Loche is the Methye Portage or Portage La Loche. This portage to the Clearwater River was in use for more than a century during the North American fur trade. Brigades such as the Portage La Loche Brigade from Fort Garry came from the south while the Athabasca and Mackenzie brigades came from the north. At Rendezvous Lake on the 19-kilometre (12 mi) long portage the fur brigades would meet every year and exchange trade goods for furs. The furs were then brought to York Factory on the Hudson Bay for shipment to England. The Methye Portage is now part of the Clearwater River Provincial Park and a National Historic Site.

== History ==
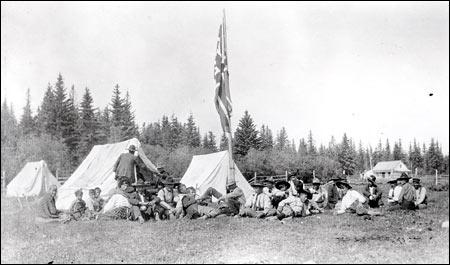
Treaty 8 payments in West La Loche (1911)

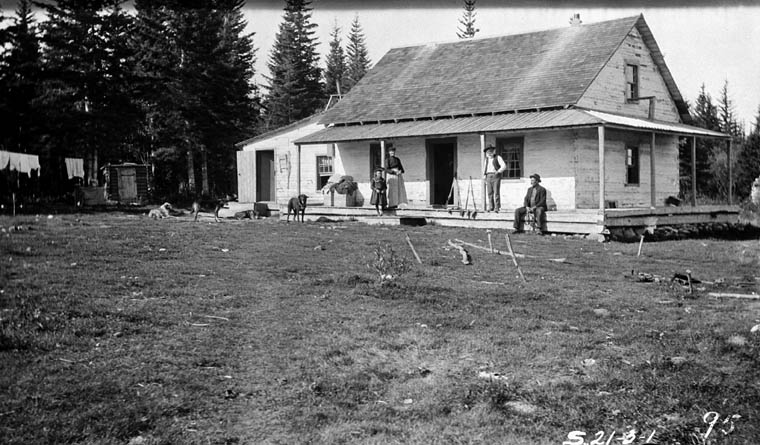
HBC residence in West La Loche (1908)

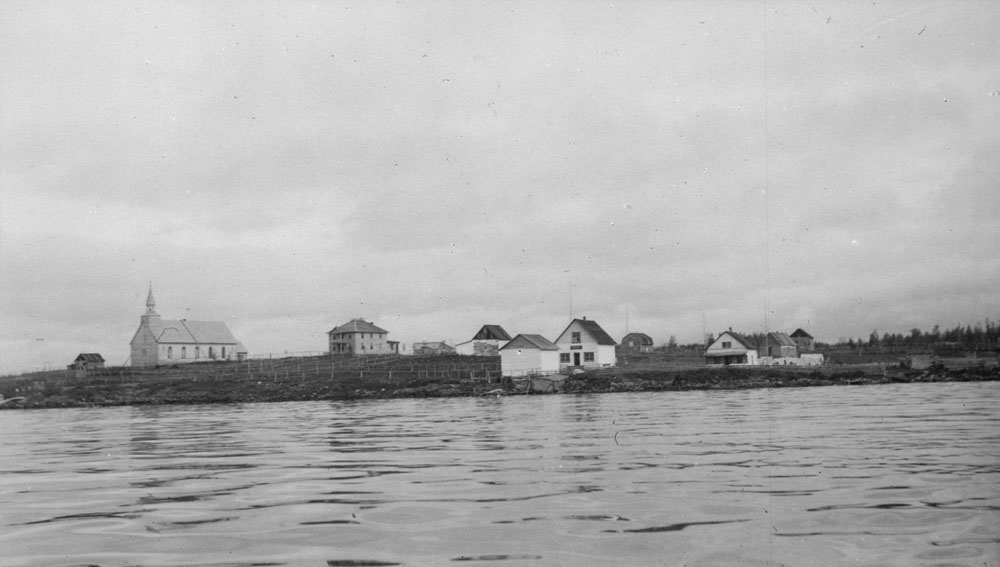
La Loche in 1935 with Revillon Freres Post

Fur trade posts were built on Lac La Loche soon after Peter Pond came through the Methye Portage in 1778. The Atlas of Canada shows four posts of the North West Company beginning in 1780 to 1819 and three posts of the Hudson's Bay Company beginning in 1819.

Another map by the archaeologist Don Steer in 1972 shows the locations and the dates of seven of these posts. North West Company posts were located on the large peninsula called 'Big Point' (circa 1789-91) and on the south west side of the lake (1819–21). A Hudson's Bay post was located at the mouth of the portage in 1810. Transportation depots were located at each end of the portage from the 1820s to 1880s. In 1857 a permanent trading post was built on the south end of the Portage. This post moved to nearby West La Loche in the 1870s until it was destroyed by fire in 1936. The HBC relocated their post across the lake at La Loche in the newly purchased Revillon Frères buildings where they remained until they sold their northern stores in 1987. The Revillon Frères post had been in La Loche since 1906.

Missionary priests have been coming to La Loche since 1845. In 1860 the separate La Loche Mission of Notre Dame de la Visitation was established. Father Jean-Marie Pénard O.M.I. (the first resident priest of La Loche from 1895 to 1917) wrote in 1895 that the population of La Loche at the Mission was around 100 people and the population at the fort in West La Loche (6 mi (9.7 km)s from the Portage) was 60 to 70 people. In 1911 he wrote that La Loche had 200 people with another 80 to 100 people living in two communities across the lake. He added that during the autumn of 1911 most residents left for winter camps to the north to hunt leaving only 60 or 70 people around the lake.

In 1922 Father Jean-Baptiste Ducharme O.M.I. wrote that there were 500 people in the La Loche Mission area. The Mission included other communities such as Bull's House (at the end of the La Loche River), Turnor Lake, Descharme Lake and Garson Lake.

In the 1940s a convent was built for the Grey Nuns (now a private residence) along with the first hospital and the first school of the community. In 1953 a new Roman Catholic Mission church which is still in use was constructed.

The first road (Highway 155) reached La Loche in 1963. Water/sewer and electricity became available to most homes in 1974. Direct dial telephone came in 1974, television in 1976 and a skating arena in 1978. In 1979 a new high school was opened, Highway 955 to the Cluff Lake uranium mine site was completed and the Clearwater River Dene Nation was officially created.

=== Early settlement ===
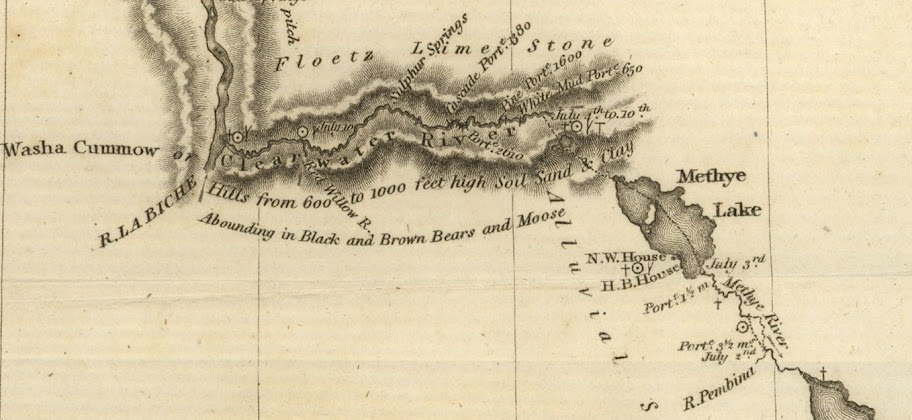
Franklin's 1819–1822 map shows the fur trade route from Peter Pond Lake to the Athabasca River and the NWC and HBC posts on Lac La Loche (Methye Lake).

In 1820 George Back while travelling through with Franklin's Coppermine expedition of 1819–1822 stopped at Lac La Loche House (the HBC trading post). He described this post as "logs piled one above the other with mud and moss to fill up the crevices - there is a single partition which divides the Master's room from that of the men. - the former has half a roof to it - some parchment windows make up the whole". The NWC Post, he wrote was "a square and flat roofed hut just seven feet high - neither wind nor weather tight in which are stowed - Master, men, women, children, dogs and sledges".

Back provides an early indication of settlement on Lac La Loche when on his return journey in 1822 he wrote in his journal: "We touched at the houses on the borders of the lake and embarked a man in each canoe".

=== 2016 shootings ===
On January 22, 2016, four people were killed and seven others injured in a shooting spree in La Loche. Two people, said to be the suspect's cousins, were killed at their home, a teacher and an educational assistant were killed at La Loche Community School. A 17-year-old male suspect was apprehended and taken into custody.

== Demographics ==
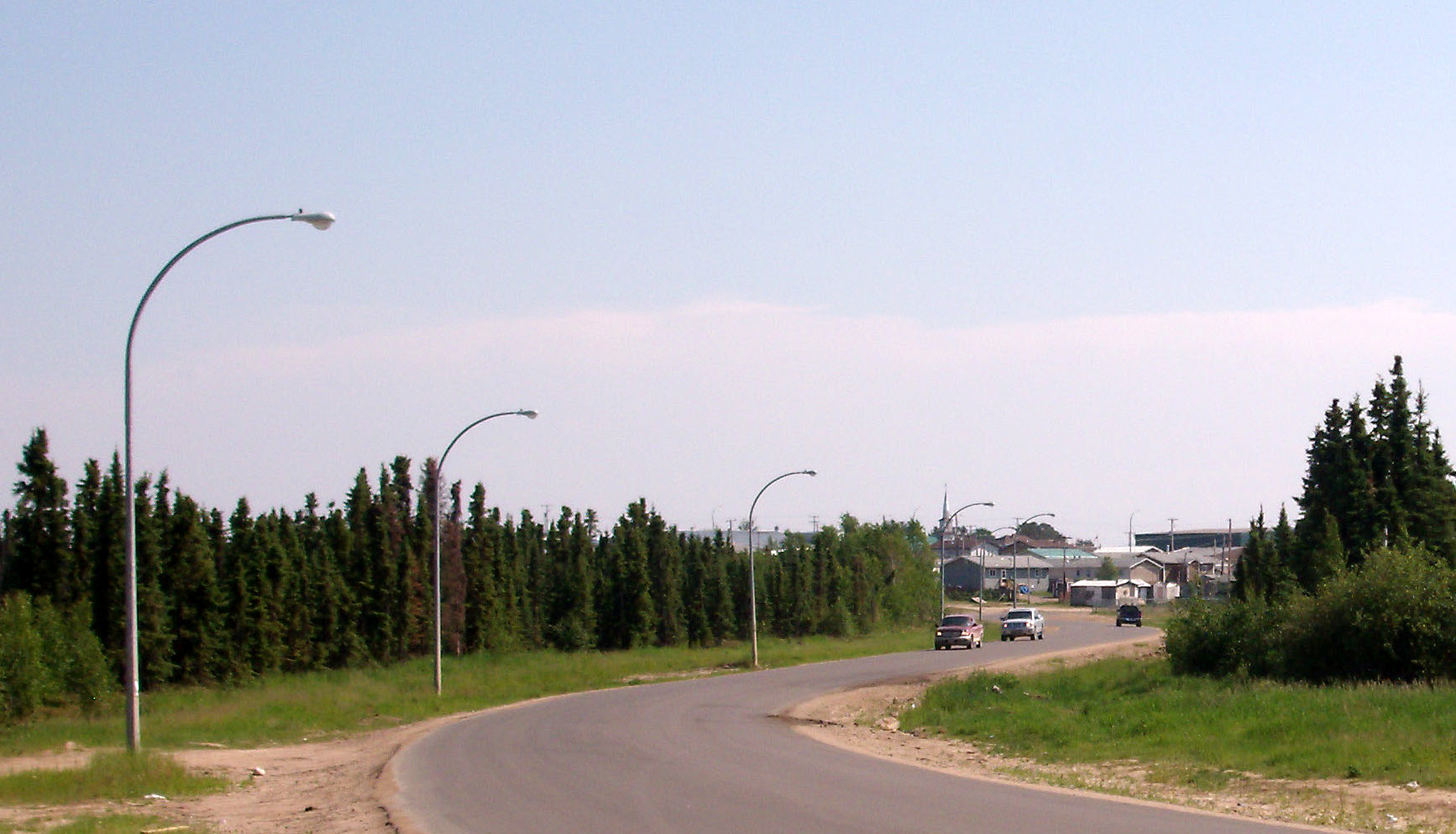
Uptown La Loche from Marie Street

In the 2021 Census of Population conducted by Statistics Canada, La Loche had a population of 2,514 living in 724 of its 814 total private dwellings, a change of 2.9% from its 2016 population of 2,444. With a land area of 15.47 km^{2} (5.97 sq mi), it had a population density of 162.5/km^{2} (420.9/sq mi) in 2021.

Canada census – La Loche community profile

| | 2021 | 2016 | 2011 |
| Population | 2,514 (+2.9% from 2016) | 2,827 (+8.3% from 2011) | 2,611 (+11.2% from 2006) |
| Land area | 15.47 km^{2} (5.97 sq mi) | 15.59 km^{2} (6.02 sq mi) | 15.59 km^{2} (6.02 sq mi) |
| Population density | 162.5/km^{2} (421/sq mi) | 181.3/km^{2} (470/sq mi) | 167.5/km^{2} (434/sq mi) |
| Median age | 25.6 (M: 23.4, F: 27.6) | | 22.6 (M: 21.6, F: 23.4) |
| Private dwellings | 814 (total) 724 (occupied) | 786 (total) | 700 (total) |
| Median household income | $71,500 |

References: 2021 2016 2011

Historical populations
| Year | Pop. | ±% |
|---|---|---|
| 1906 | 216 | — |
| 1986 | 1,623 | +651.4% |
| 1991 | 1,691 | +4.2% |
| 1996 | 1,966 | +16.3% |
| 2001 | 2,136 | +8.6% |
| 2006 | 2,348 | +9.9% |
| 2011 | 2,611 | +11.2% |
| 2016 | 2,827 | +8.3% |

The La Loche Population Centre has a population of 3,649 in two adjoining communities. These two communities and their 2016 Canada Census population are: La Loche (northern village) with 2,827 residents and the Clearwater River Dene Nation with 822 residents.

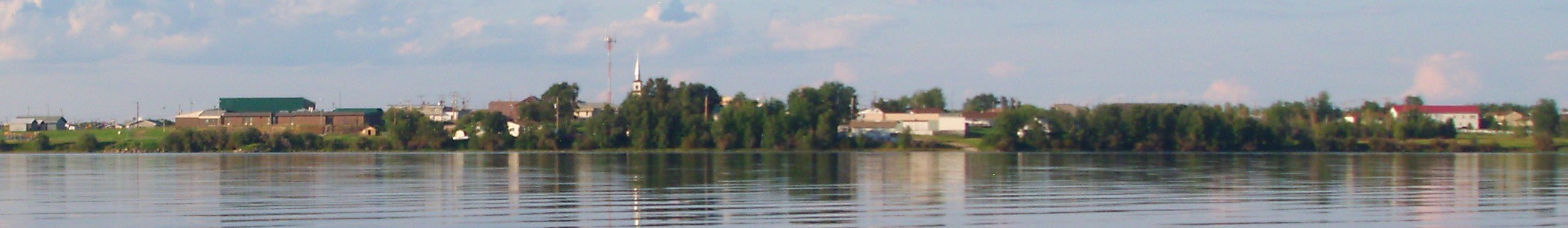
La Loche panorama in 2015

In 2006 there were 590 registered members of the Clearwater River Dene Nation and other First Nations living in La Loche. In 2011 there were 680 registered members.

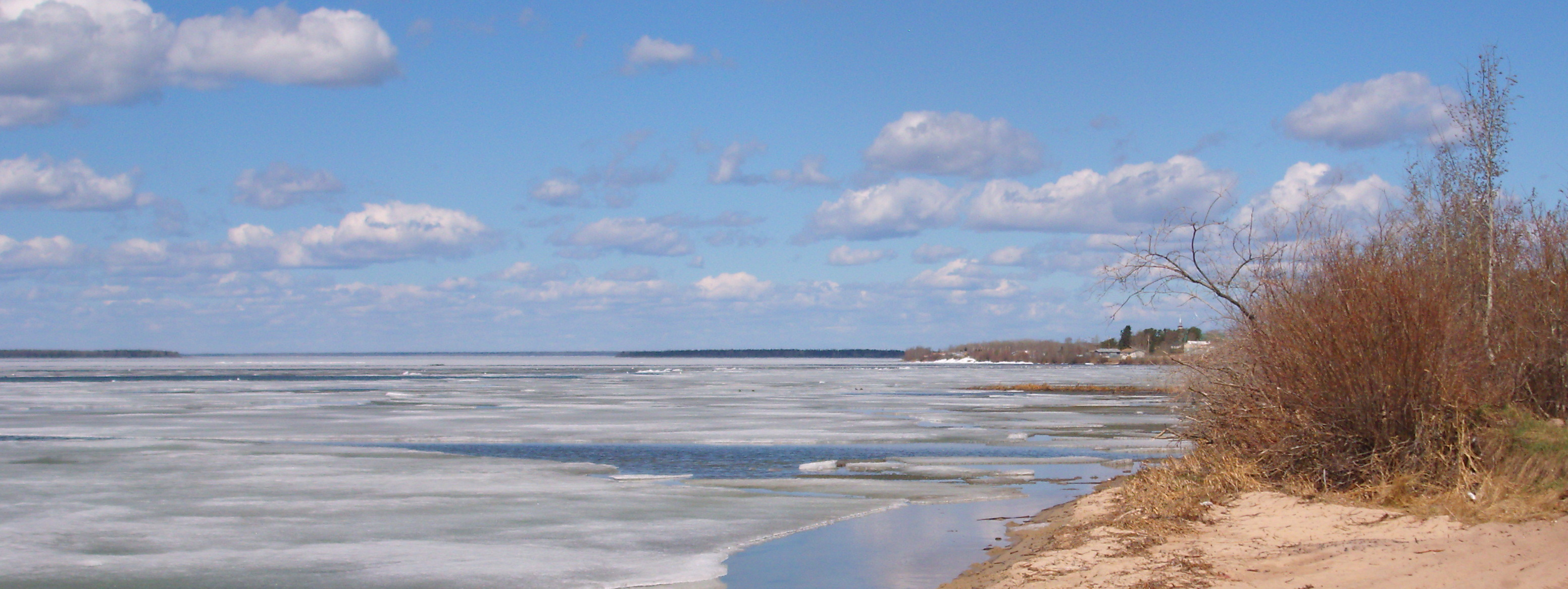
Ice break-up on Lac La Loche May 13, 2013

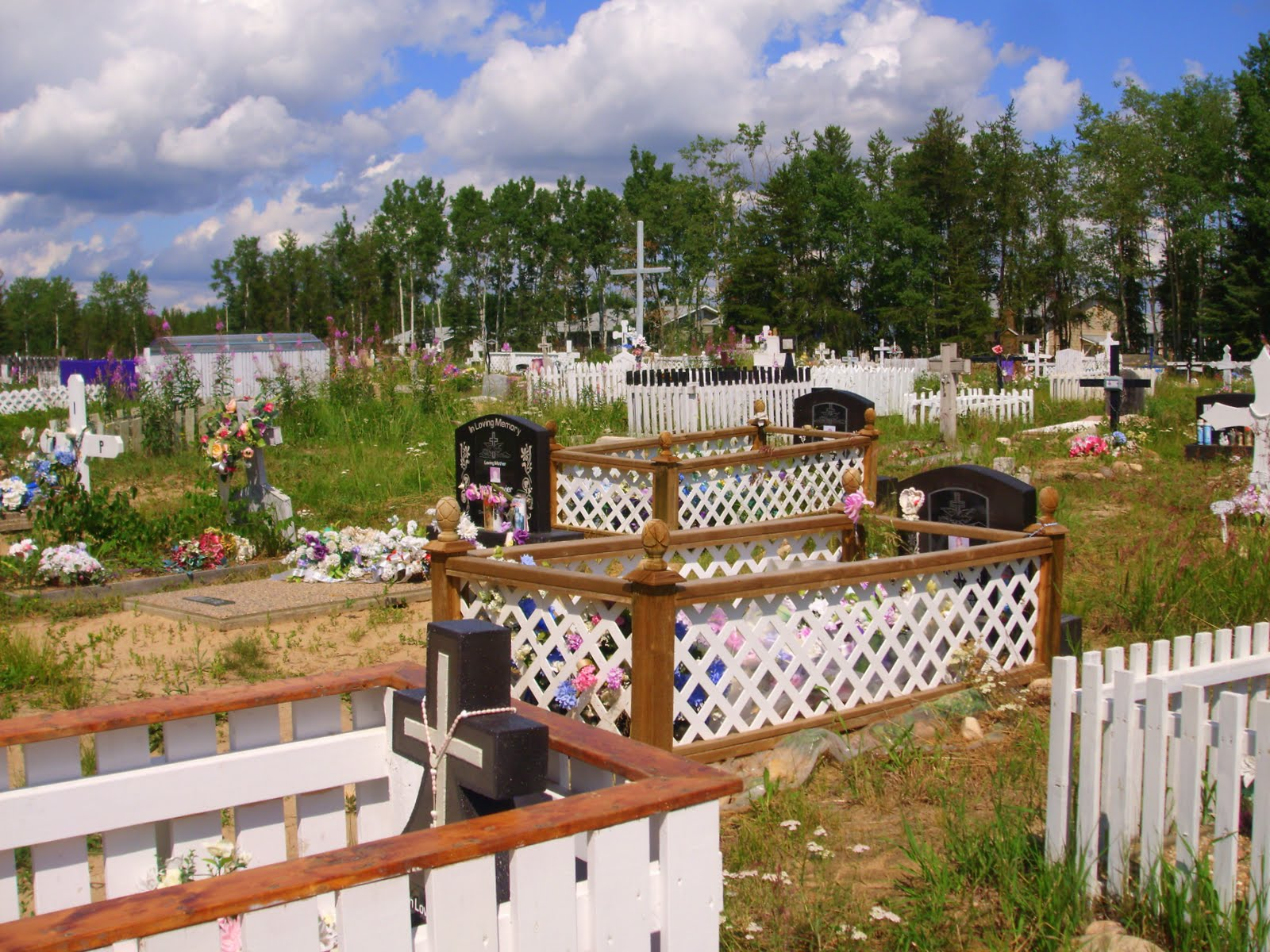
La Loche Cemetery

Aboriginal population, 2011
| | Population | Percent |
|---|---|---|
| Métis | 1,785 | 68% |
| First Nations | 740 | 28.2% |
| Non-Aboriginal identity | 90 | 3.4% |
| Total respondent population | 2625 | 100% |

Non-official languages spoken, 2011
| | Population | Percent |
|---|---|---|
| Dene | 2,420 | 99.2% |
| Cree | 10 | 0.4% |
| Non-Aboriginal languages | 20 | 0.8% |
| Total respondent population | 2440 | 100% |

La Loche population by religion, 2011
| | Population | Percent |
|---|---|---|
| Total Christian | 2,565 | 97.5% |
| Catholic | 2,525 | 96% |
| Other Christian | 50 | 1.9% |
| Other religions | 0 | 0% |
| No religious affiliation | 60 | 2.3% |
| Total respondent population | 2630 | 100% |

== Recreation ==
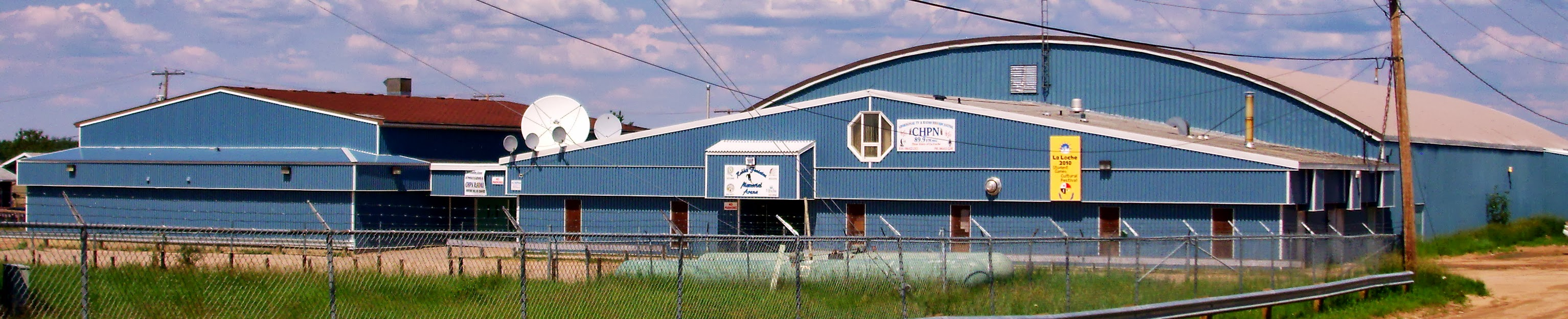
La Loche Arena

The La Loche Arena Complex houses the Robbie Fontaine Memorial Arena, a meeting hall, the local radio station CHPN-FM, activity rooms and offices.

The Dave O'Hara Public Library at Ducharme School offers internet access.

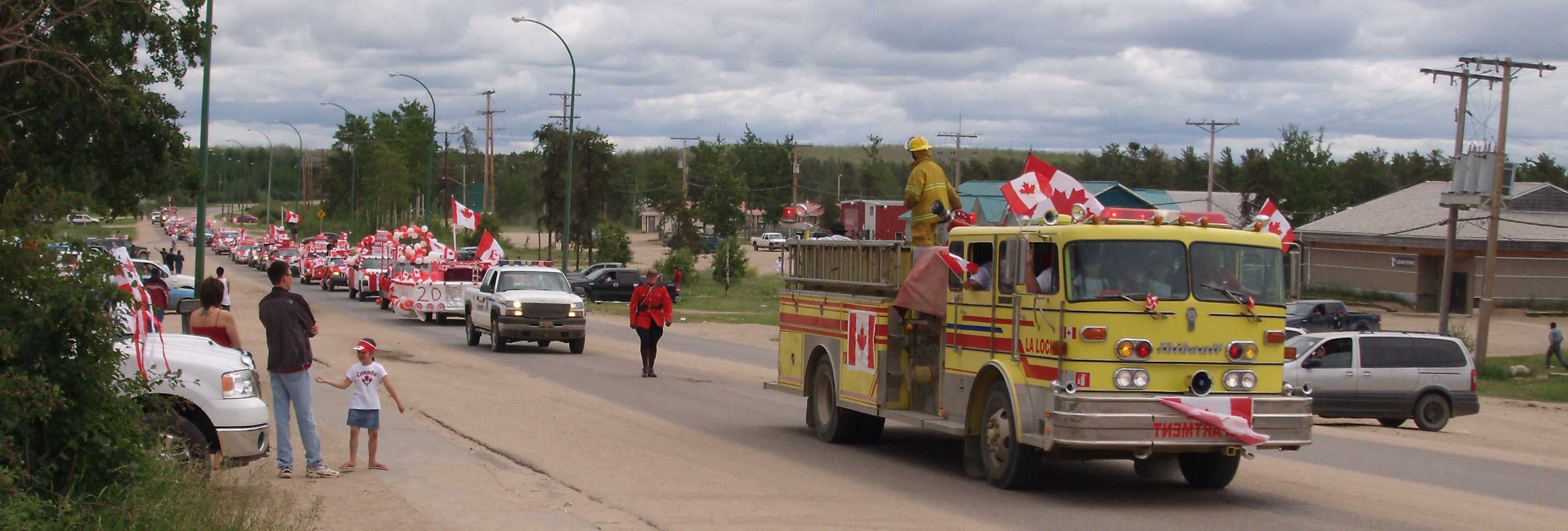
Canada Day Parade 2008

The La Loche Friendship Centre and the La Loche Sport, Recreation and Culture Board organize many of the activities and festivals that occur every year and are working together on the development of a community recreation area which now offers a skateboard park, a children's playground and an outdoor skating rink.

The week-long "Yanessa Days Festival", the "La Loche Long Sun Run," and the Canada Day celebrations are a few of the popular yearly events.

== Churches ==
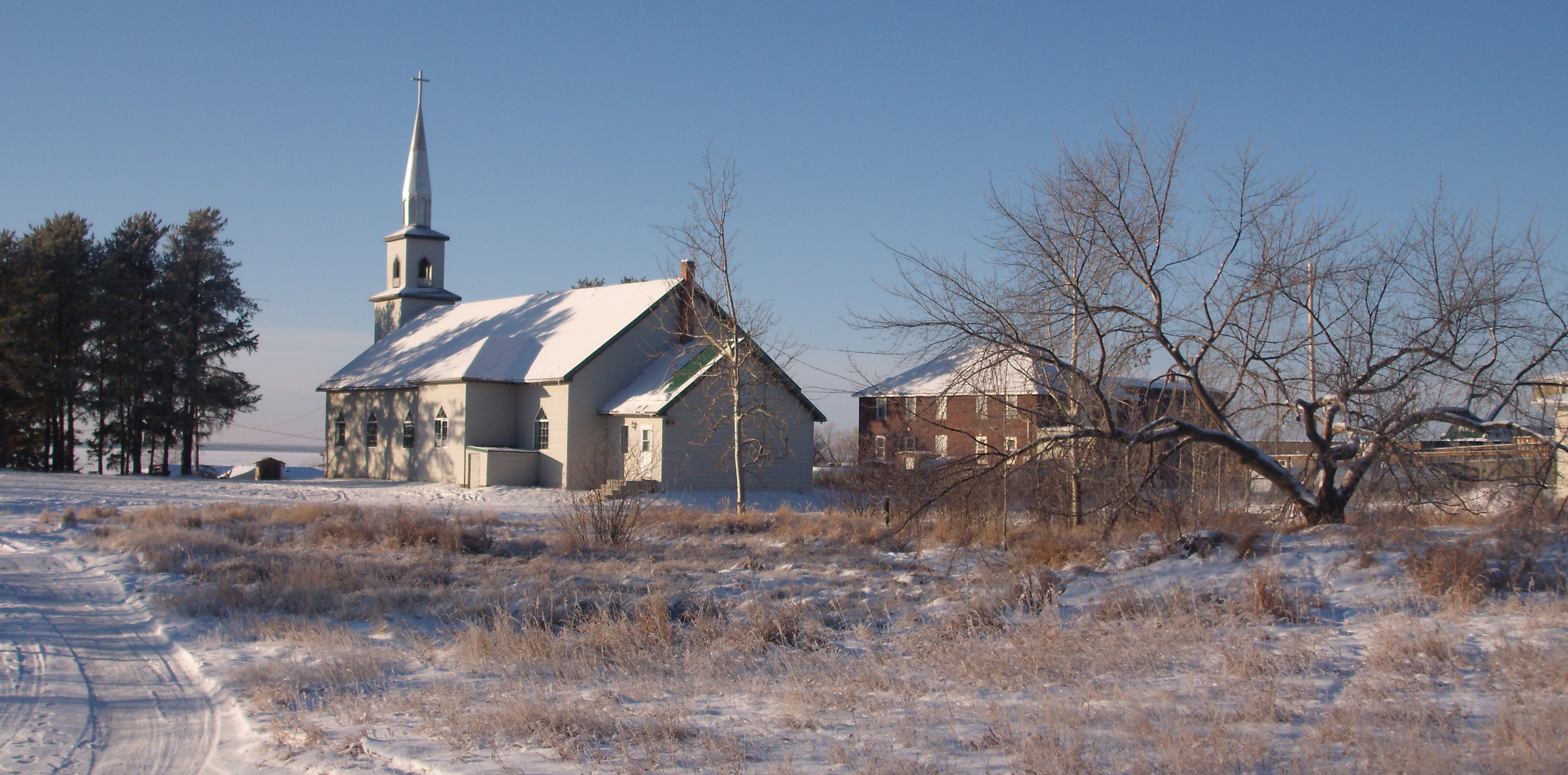
R.C. Mission church and old Grey Nun's Convent

Our Lady of the Visitation Roman Catholic Church has regular services (10:30 a.m. on Sundays) and is part of the Roman Catholic Archdiocese of Keewatin–Le Pas.

Clearwater River Ministries has regular services (6:00 PM on Sunday) and bible studies (6:00 PM on Wednesday).

== Education ==
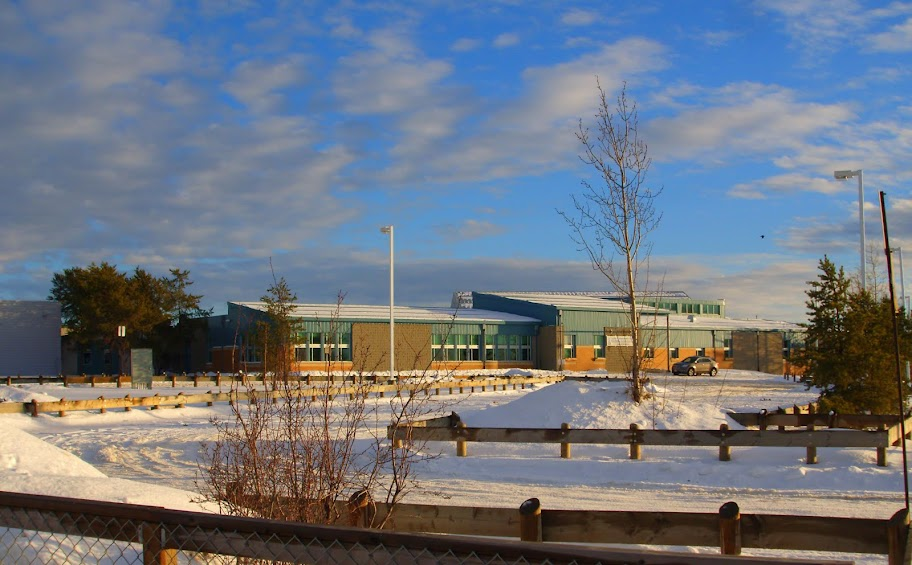
Dene High School

La Loche Community School consists of two buildings (The Ducharme Building and the Dene Building). The Ducharme Building offers the Pre-K to 6 program while the Dene Building delivers the 7 to 12 program. The school has an enrollment of over 900 students. The school is a provincial school and is part of the Northern Lights School Division#113. The first school of La Loche was built in 1941 and was called the Community Day School. In 1942 it had an enrollment of 23.

Clearwater River Dene School at Clearwater River is a K-12 school with an enrollment of 200.

The Gabriel Dumont Institute offers adult basic education and skills training.

== Infrastructure ==
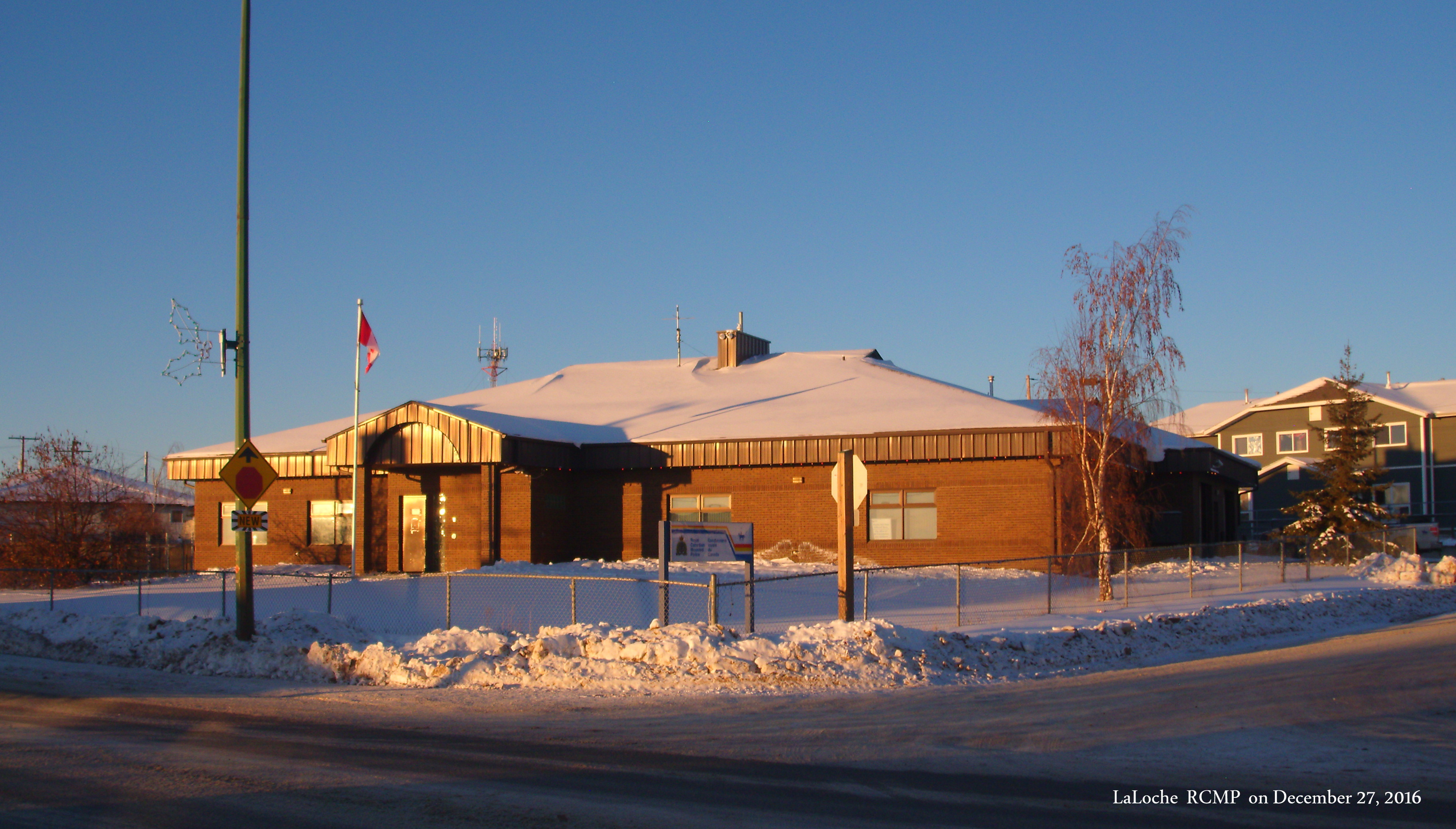
La Loche detachment of the RCMP

La Loche has a business community that serves the population and the mining companies exploring north of the community.

Air services are provided via the La Loche Airport. The La Loche Water Aerodrome is no longer in use. The Canada Post office receives mail five times a week.

The La Loche detachment of the Royal Canadian Mounted Police (RCMP) and the La Loche Volunteer Fire Department serve La Loche and nearby communities.

=== Utilities ===
The northern village of La Loche provides water and sewer service, garbage pick-up, road maintenance, snow removal and through CHPN Communications local radio and cable television services (12 free channels are available). SaskPower provides electricity. SaskTel provides telephone, 911 emergency service and internet services (including high speed service). Cellular service is available through multiple service providers.

Propane and Heating Oil are the main sources of heat in the winter.

Methy Construction and Maintenance Corporation owned by the northern village offers commercial and residential property development and construction and contracting for heavy equipment.

=== Health care ===
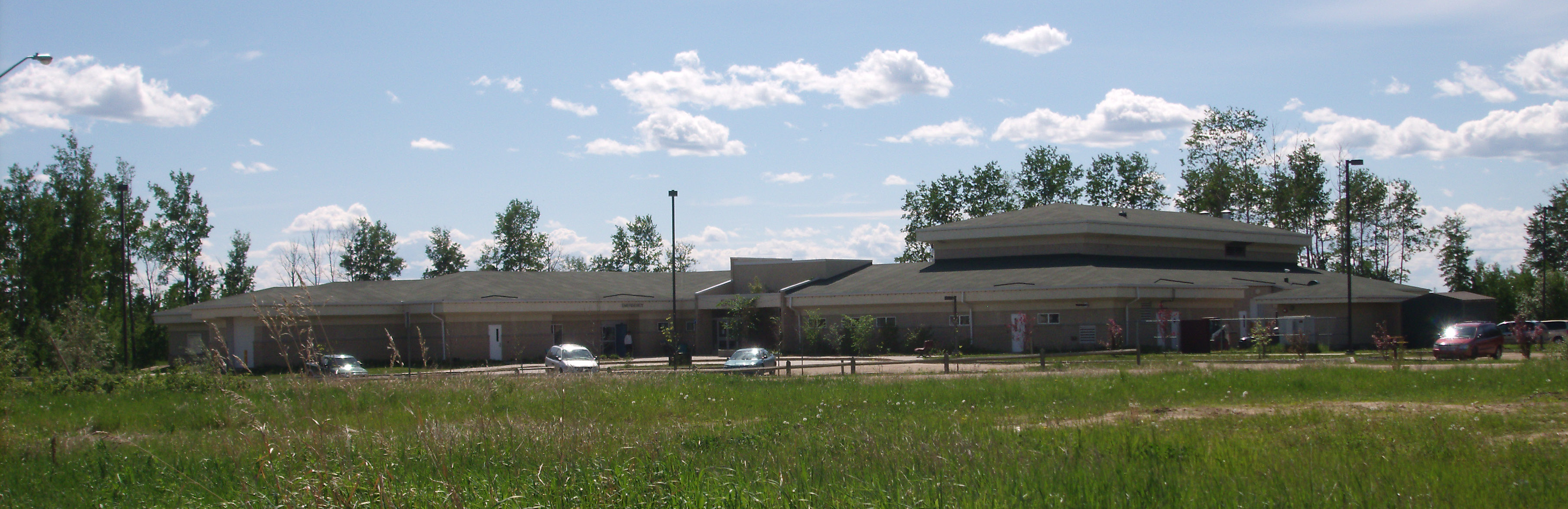
La Loche Hospital

The La Loche Health Centre serves a regional population of over 4,000 people and is part of the Saskatchewan Health Authority. The La Loche Medical Clinic operates from within the main hospital building. Ambulance services are available as is a 911 call service for emergencies, and there are two pharmacies within the community.

The Armand Bekkattla Treatment Centre is located at the Clearwater River Dene Nation.

== See also ==
- List of communities in Saskatchewan
- List of villages in Saskatchewan
