= Clearwater River Dene Nation =

First Nations band government in Canada

- Band No. 401
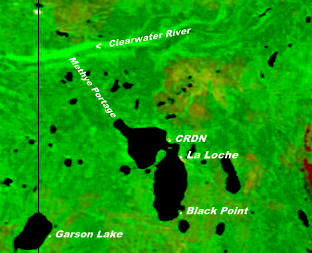
- Satellite image of Clearwater River territory
- People: Chipewyan
- Treaty: Treaty 8
- Headquarters: Clearwater River Band # 222
- Province: Saskatchewan

Land
- Other reserves: Clearwater River Dene Band 221; Clearwater River Dene Band 222; Clearwater River Dene Band 223
- Land area: 95.111 km^{2} (36.723 sq mi)

Population (2019)
- On reserve: 986
- Off reserve: 1323
- Total population: 2309

Government
- Chief: Teddy Clark

Tribal Council
- Meadow Lake Tribal Council

The Clearwater River Dene Nation (Chipewyan: Tı̨tëlase tué) is a Dene First Nations band government in the boreal forest area of northern Saskatchewan, Canada. It maintains offices in the village of Clearwater River situated on the eastern shore of Lac La Loche. The Clearwater River Dene Nation reserve of Clearwater River shares its southern border with the village of La Loche.

== History ==
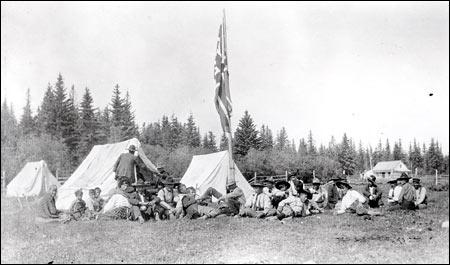
Members receiving Treaty 8 payments at Portage La Loche (West La Loche). The HBC residence is in the background (1911)

Whitefish Lake, now called Garson Lake, was already an old established Dene village of 50 people in 1880. On August 4, 1899 the residents were gathered in Fort McMurray and selected Adam Boucher as headman to represent them in the signing of Treaty 8.

The descendants of this group from Garson Lake became known as the Portage La Loche Band. At the La Loche Mission in 1907 these families asked that treaty payments be made to them at La Loche or Buffalo River so they wouldn't have to travel all the way to Fort McMurray. On July 17, 1911 they received their treaty payments at Portage La Loche (now called West La Loche). In 1920 the Portage La Loche Band (now known as the Clearwater River Dene Nation) had 66 members.

=== Land transfers ===
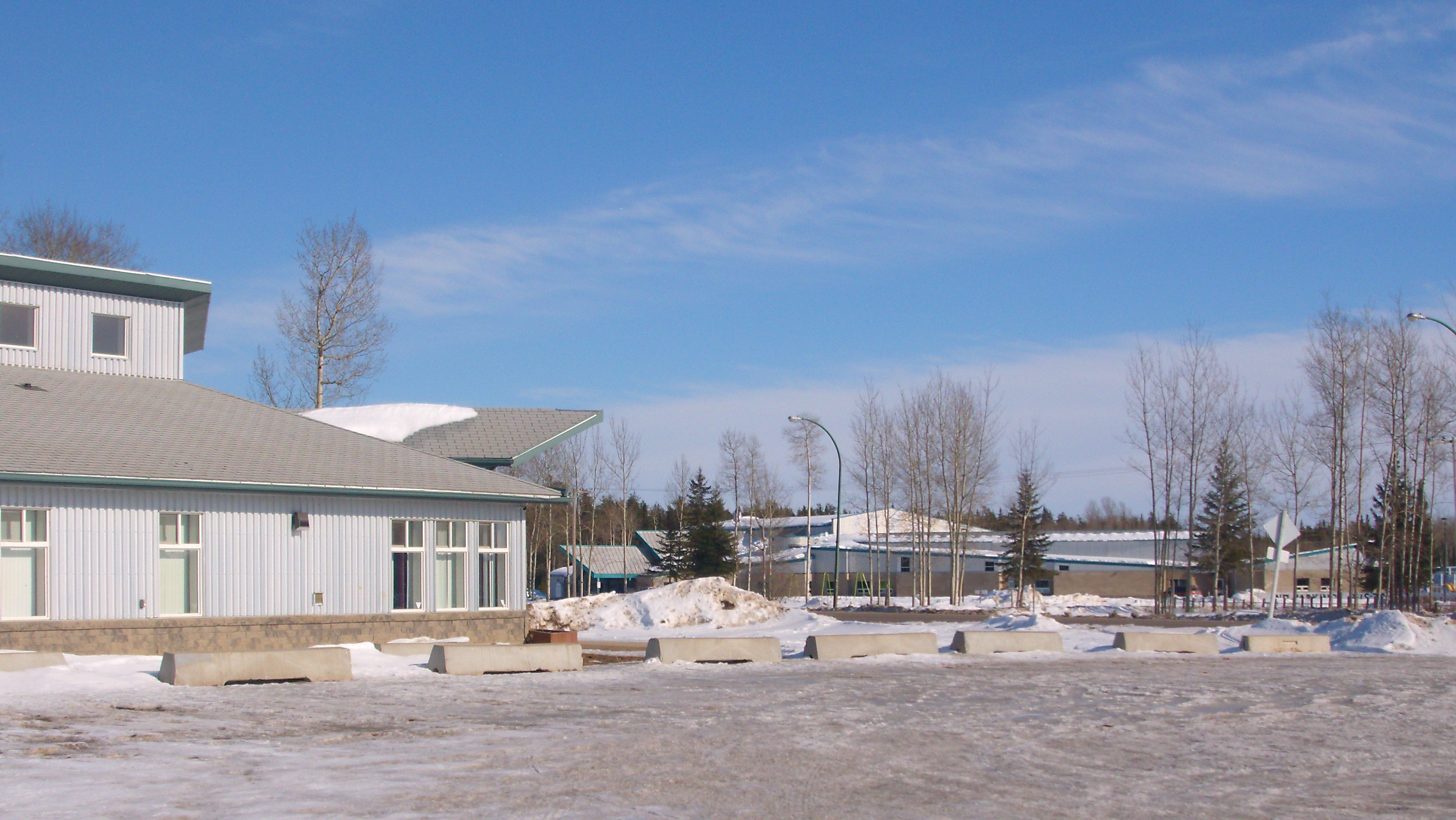
Clearwater River Dene Nation band office with the school in the background

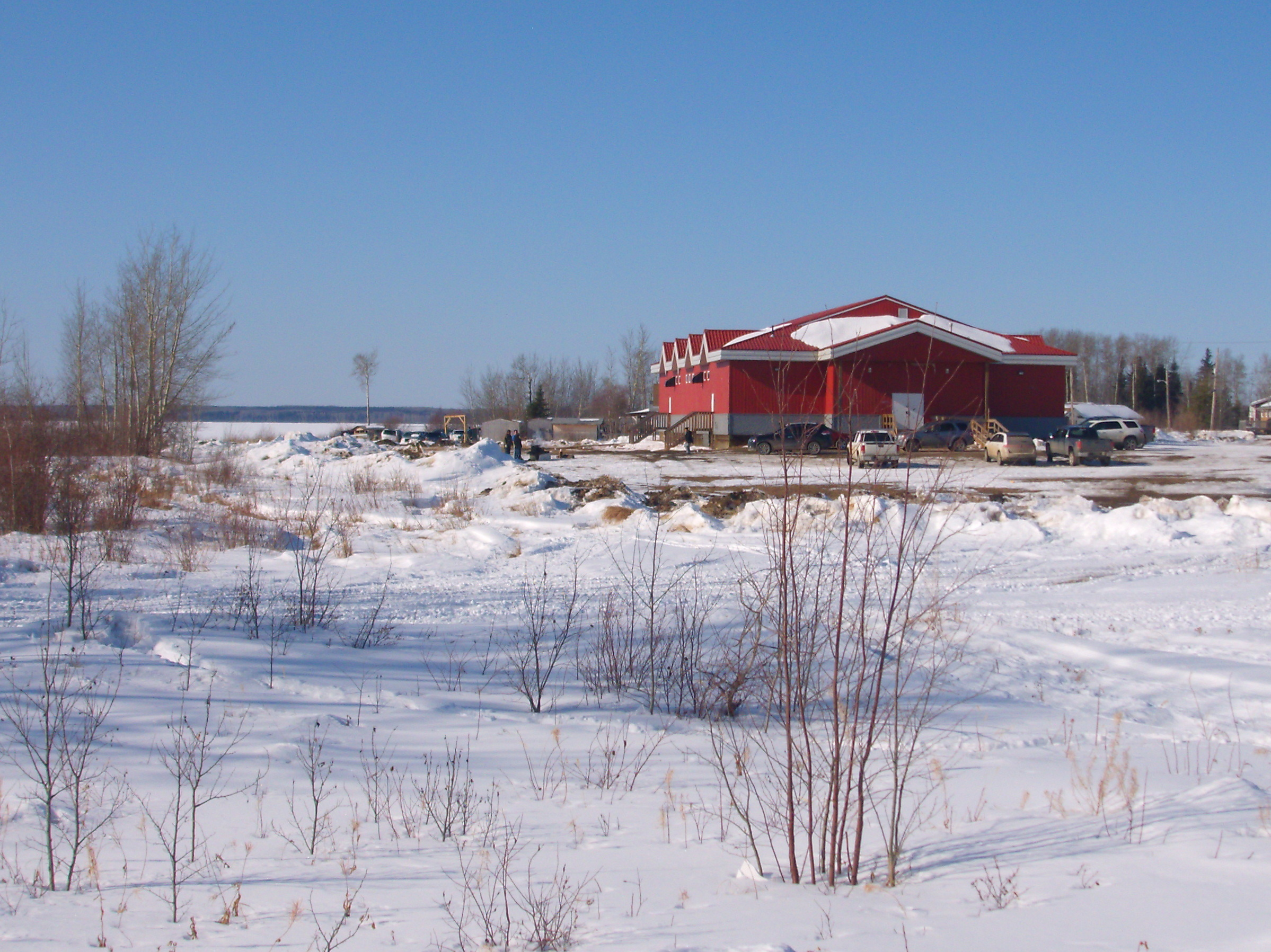
CRDN community hall on Lac La Loche

In 1970 three parcels of land were transferred to the Portage La Loche Band (IR 221, IR 222, IR 223). For a time the "La Loche Landing" (IR 223) was being developed as a village and in 1974 it had 70 residents, however most of the band members chose to live in the village of La Loche. The band had about 280 members living in La Loche and the La Loche Landing in 1975.

In 1979 the parcel at Palmbere Lake/Linval Lake (IR 222) area was traded for land bordering La Loche to the north. This area also referred to as IR 222 is now home to the village of Clearwater River. The third parcel (IR 221) is on the south west shore of Lac La Loche. It had a few houses in the 1970s. In 1820 the trading posts of the Hudson's Bay Company and the North West Company were located on the lake in that area.

The village of Clearwater River has grown rapidly since 1979 when it was first officially created. The population increased from 301 in 1986 to 778 in 2011. Some of this increase was from members living in La Loche who relocated to Clearwater River as housing became available.

=== Membership ===
As of February 2025, there were 3,246 registered members with 1,199 members living on-reserve or on crown land and 2,047 members living off-reserve. CRDN is a member of the MLTC Program Services Inc. and the Federation of Sovereign Indigenous Nations (formerly the Federation of Saskatchewan Indian Nations).

In the 2006 Canada Census there were 590 registered members of the Clearwater River Dene Nation and other First Nations living in La Loche. In 2011 there were 680 registered members.

=== Territory ===
- Clearwater River Dene Band 221 is 5,741.4 ha (14,187 acres) 56°20′31″N 109°32′42″W on the southwest shore of Lac La Loche and unoccupied.
- Clearwater River Dene Band 222 is 2,900 ha (7,200 acres) 56°31′36″N 109°24′43″W and contains the village of Clearwater River.
- Clearwater River Dene Band 223 is 869.7 ha (2,149 acres) 56°03′16″N 108°43′3″W known as The Landing. It is located 24 km (15 mi) north of Buffalo Narrows on Highway 155. The Landing had a population of 19 in 2011. It extends northeast from the shore of Peter Pond Lake to Taylor Lake and continues to include a portion across Taylor Lake.

== Village statistics ==
Historical populations
| Year | Pop. | ±% |
|---|---|---|
| 1986 | 301 | — |
| 1991 | 455 | +51.2% |
| 1996 | 548 | +20.4% |
| 2001 | 584 | +6.6% |
| 2006 | 658 | +12.7% |
| 2011 | 778 | +18.2% |
| 2016 | 822 | +5.7% |

Canada census – Clearwater River Dene 222 community profile

| | 2021 | 2011 |
| Population | 831 (+1.1% from 2016) | 778 (+18.2% from 2006) |
| Land area | 28.87 km^{2} (11.15 sq mi) | 30.50 km^{2} (11.78 sq mi) |
| Population density | 28.8/km^{2} (75/sq mi) | 25.5/km^{2} (66/sq mi) |
| Median age | 25.0 (M: 24.0, F: 27.2) | 22.0 (M: 21.2, F: 23.3) |
| Private dwellings | 230 (total) 212 (occupied) | 199 (total) |
| Median household income | $75,000 |

References: 2021 2011

== Education ==
Clearwater River Dene School offers a kindergarten to Grade 12 program. The students take part in the Dënesųłiné immersion program offered at the school.

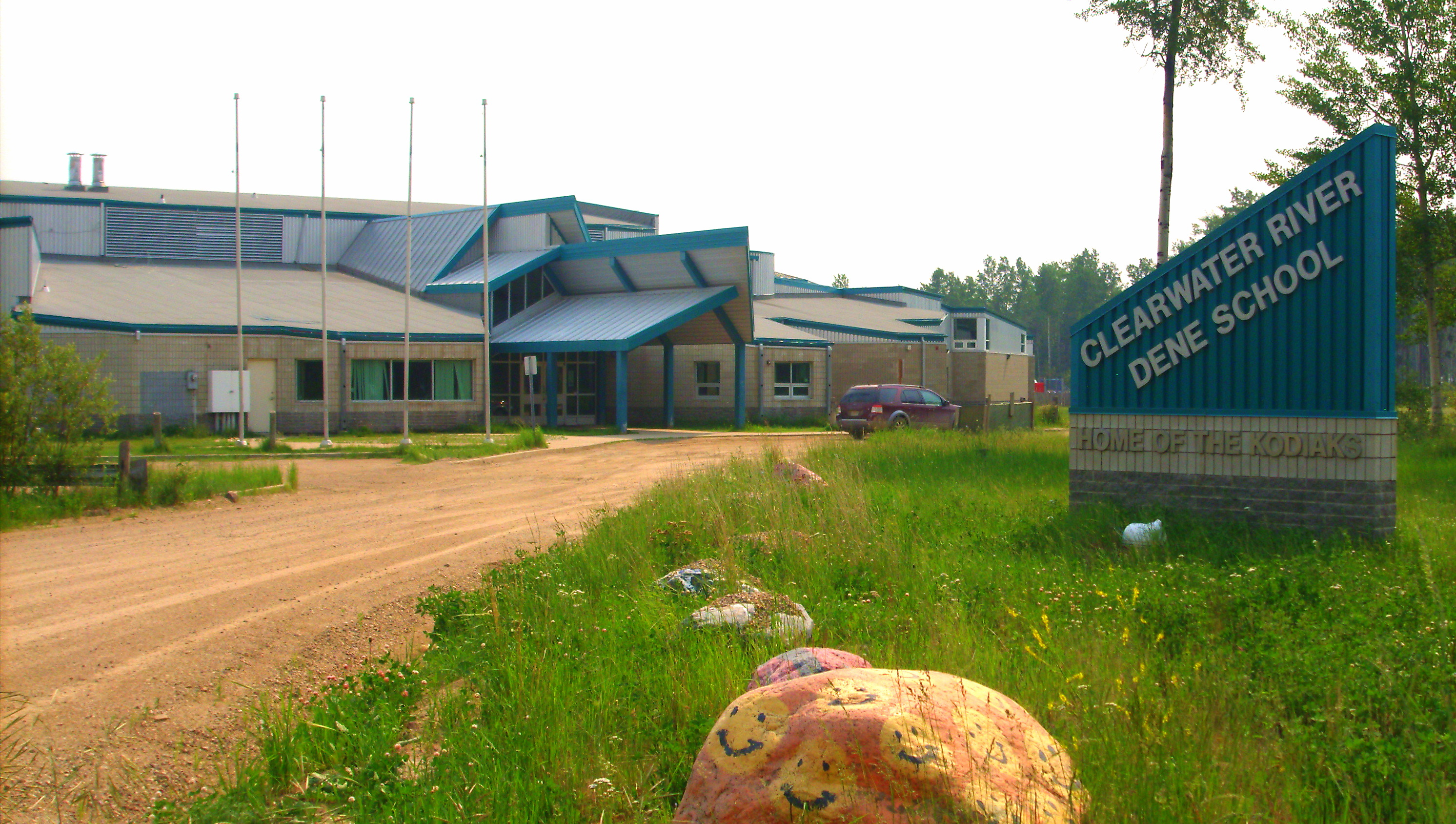
Clearwater River Dene School (Home of the Kodiaks)

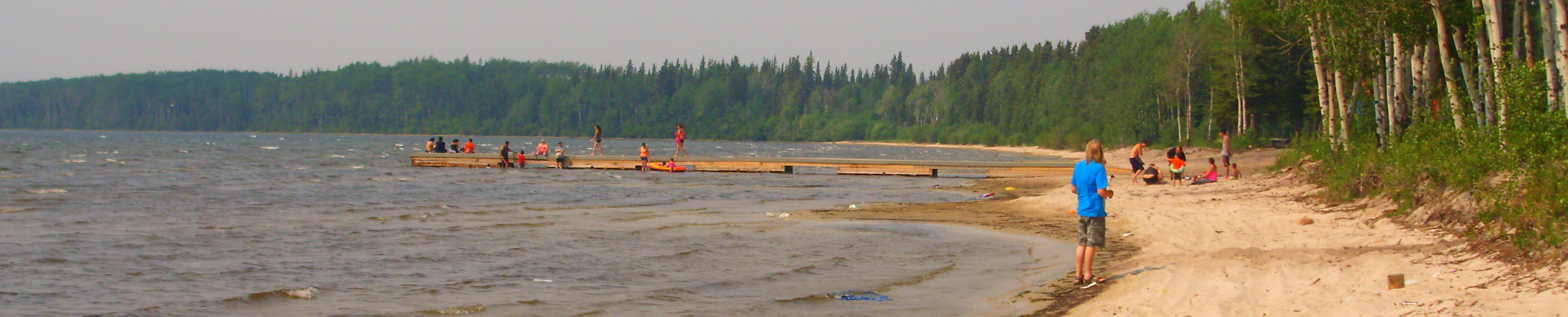
Clearwater Beach on Lac La Loche within the Clearwater River Dene Nation Cultural Grounds. A pall of smoke from nearby forest fires obscures the sky.

== See also ==
- Chipewyan
