= UC-9 =

American foldable submachine gun

- Type: Foldable submachine gun
- Place of origin: United States

Production history
- Designer: Utah Connor
- Designed: 1970s
- Manufacturer: Pearl Manufacturing, David Boatman, M6 Management Corporation
- Developed from: Uzi 9mm
- Unit cost: US$5000
- No. built: 86
- Variants: 2

Specifications
- Mass: 7.75 lb (3.52 kg)
- Length: 20.5 in (520 mm) (deployed), 10.38 in (264 mm) (folded)
- Barrel length: 8.38 in (213 mm)
- Cartridge: 9x19mm NATO (9mm parabellum)
- Action: Blowback
- Rate of fire: 690-895 RPM (original run), 602-761 RPM (later run)
- Muzzle velocity: 1,250 ft/s (380 m/s) (original run), 1,189–1,226 ft/s (362–374 m/s) (later run)
- Feed system: Uzi 9mm magazine (25- or 32-round)
- Sights: Iron sights (original), laser sight (later)

The UC-9, also known as the DEB M21, is a foldable submachine gun designed by Utah Connor in the mid 1970s. Based on an Uzi 9mm and using unmodified Uzi magazines, the gun can be folded in half into a compact box design, with the initial production run styled to resemble contemporary portable transistor radios. It fires exclusively in fully automatic mode.

Only nine guns were created in the original production run, in addition to the prototype, due to the Hughes Amendment halting their production. However almost a hundred additional receivers had been built and registered by this point, 76 of which were subsequently bought by Michael Shyne and completed in another run.

The UC-9 saw prominent exposure in popular culture due to its use in RoboCop 2 in 1990.

== History ==
Utah Connor originally designed the UC-9 in the mid 1970s while working for Pearl Manufacturing. He was inspired by existing French folding submachine guns including the Hotchkiss Type Universal, MAS CR-39, and the MAT-49. The "UC" stood for "undercover", while also conveniently being Connor's own initials. Connor originally intended to market the gun to police agencies for covert operations.

Upon demonstrating his initial prototype at the Las Vegas Soldier of Fortune show, Connor was approached by Tim Bixler of South Central Research Company of Katy, Texas with a view to creating a partnership. Connor and Bixler partnered with former Green Beret Captain David Boatman to create the initial production run, known as the DEB M21 (David E Boatman Model 21). Nine guns were completed (in addition to the original) before May 19, 1986, the date at which the Hughes Amendment came into force in the United States, which prohibited the manufacture of new machine guns of that form.

While less than a dozen full guns had been completed, Connor had manufactured and registered a little under one hundred additional receivers with Pearl Manufacturing prior to the Hughes Amendment deadline. As it is the receiver which is subject to United States legislation, this meant that these could be completed into fully legal, transferable weapons. Michael Shyne of M6 Management Corporation first encountered Connor and the UC-9 at a shoot in New Mexico and spent years attempting to purchase either a completed weapon or the remaining receivers to no avail, with Connor refusing to even name a price; this persisted even after Shyne offered to purchase and complete all of the weapons but return half of them to Connor. After Connor's death, the receivers were passed to a friend, who Shyne eventually tracked down; by this point there were 76 receivers remaining, and the friend was willing to entertain offers to sell them for completion as other than creating some CAD files from Connor's original pencil sketches, he had made little progress in completing them himself. Shyne purchased all of the parts and receivers and assembled a team consisting of himself, friend and retired NASA engineer John Mathis, Scott Andrey Machine Works, Dan King, and Byron Starnes. Despite initially estimating that it would take six months to complete the guns, the work eventually took considerably longer.

== Design ==
The UC-9 is based on the Uzi 9mm and fires from an open bolt in fully automatic mode only. It uses unmodified Uzi magazines in both 25- and 32-round capacity, and is designed so that it can be folded while a 32-round magazine is fitted. Its rate of fire varies between 690 and 895 rounds per minute depending on ammunition used and whether one or two O-ring buffer pads are used.

In its folded configuration it is not possible to accidentally fire the weapon as the magazine is folded out of contact with the bolt. It is not possible to fold the gun while it is cocked.

The charging handle is fitted with a ratcheting mechanism to prevent the gun from inadvertently firing if the user's hand slips while cocking it; it also features a finger guard designed to prevent the wielder's fingers from slipping in front of the barrel. Despite its appearance it is not designed as a forward grip.

== Variants ==
The prototype and DEC M21 versions of the gun are styled to look like contemporary portable transistor radios. They include a prop aerial from Radio Shack, and a carrying handle which integrates the weapon's iron sights. The model does not feature a safety. The guns are finished in a Teflon paint. Two are black, while the others are respectively red, light blue, dark blue, tan, yellow, green, and brown.

The Shyne guns, produced years later, drop the radio stylings as these were incongruous by the time of manufacture in the 2000s; the unit folds into an unstyled black box. Commentators suggested that possible alternative disguises could include a hardback book, tool kit, or portable disk drive. As the carrying handle has been removed, so have the original sights: as a replacement, the charging handle is fitted with a very small Weaver rail to which a Sub Compact V2-Mini laser sight is attached, and it has a hole bored through it which permits the light to pass through and illuminate the target. The Shyne guns feature a safety which, when engaged, blocks the trigger.

== Cultural impact ==
Despite its obscurity, the gun saw notable use in the 1990 film RoboCop 2, where a gun from the original DEB M21 run (including its styling as a radio), converted to use blanks, was used by the juvenile drug dealer character Hob Mills (played by Gabriel Damon). Critical reaction to a child who was a remorseless killer was strongly negative, with Roger Ebert declaring it "beneath contempt".

== See also ==
- Ares FMG
- Magpul FMG-9
- PP-90
