= List of equipment of the Ivorian Army =

This is a list of equipment of the Army of Ivory Coast in service.

== Small arms ==
Name	Image	Caliber	Type	Origin	Notes
Pistols
TT-33		7.62×25mm	Semi-automatic pistol	Soviet Union	
Beretta 92		9x19mm	Semi-automatic pistol	Italy	
MAB PA-15		9x19mm	Semi-automatic pistol	France	
MAC Mle 1950		9x19mm	Semi-automatic pistol	France	
Submachine guns
PPS-43		7.62×25mm	Submachine gun	Soviet Union	
MAT-49		9×19mm	Submachine gun	France	
Gevarm D4		9x19mm	Submachine gun	France	
H&K MP5A5		9x19mm	Submachine gun	Germany	
Rifles
MAS-36		7.5×54mm	Bolt-action rifle	France	
FN FAL		7.62×51mm	Battle rifle	Belgium	
Heckler & Koch G3		7.62×51mm	Battle rifle	Germany; France	
AKM		7.62×39mm	Assault rifle	Soviet Union	
AK-74		5.45x39mm	Assault rifle	Soviet Union	
Type 56		7.62×39mm	Assault rifle	China	
Type 81-1		7.62×39mm	Assault rifle	China	
vz. 58		7.62×39mm	Assault rifle	Czechoslovakia	
FAMAS F-1		5.56x45mm	Assault rifle	France	
M16A1		5.56x45mm	Assault rifle	United States	
SIG SG 540		5.56x45mm	Assault rifle	Switzerland	SG 540 and SG 543 variants
IWI Tavor		5.56×45mm	Bullpup; Assault rifle	Israel	Used by Ivorian Special Forces
Machine guns
RPD		7.62×39mm	Squad automatic weapon	Soviet Union	
PKM		7.62×54mmR	General-purpose machine gun	Soviet Union	
KPVT		14.5×114mm	Heavy machine gun	Soviet Union	
DShK		12.7×108mm	Heavy machine gun	Soviet Union	
MAC FM Mle. 1924/29		7.5×54mm French	Light machine gun	France	
AA-52		7.5×54mm French	General-purpose machine gun	France	
Precision rifles
SVD		7.62×54mmR	Sniper rifle	Soviet Union	

== Artillery ==
Model	Image	Caliber	Type	Origin	Numbers	Notes
Towed Artillery (4)
Obusier de 105		105 mmL/30.5	towed howitzer	France	4	Some unit monted on Dongfeng EQ2050
Rocket Artillery and Missile (6)
BM-21 Grad		122 mm	Multiple rocket launcher	Soviet Union	6	
Mortar (20)
82-BM-37		82mm mortar	Mortar	Soviet Union	10	
2B11		120mm mortar	Mortar	Soviet Union	10	
Air défense système
ZU-23-2		23mm	towed anti-aircraft gun	Soviet Union	Unknown	Monted on Toyota LC79
Bofors 40 mm Automatic Gun		40 mm	towed anti-aircraft gun	Sweden	5	
9K32 Strela-2			MANPADS	Soviet Union	Unknown	Monted on Toyota LC79

== Vehicles ==
Name	Image	Origin	Type	Caliber	Quantity	Details
Tank destroyer (7+)
VN-22B		China	Tank destroyer	105 mm	7+	Spotted during the parade on August 7th (2025)
Infantry Fighting Vehicles (19+)
BMP-1		Soviet Union	Infantry fighting vehicle	73 mm	10	
WZ-551		China	Infantry fighting vehicle	25 mm	9+	
Armoured Personnel Carriers (65+)
VN-22B		China	Armored personnel carrier			
BTR-80		Soviet Union	Armored personnel carrier	14,5 mm	6	
BTR-70MB		Belarus	Armored personnel carrier	14,5 mm	4	Modernized BTR-70 delivered in 2018.
Véhicule de l'Avant Blindé		France	Armored personnel carrier		13	
Panhard M3		France	Armored personnel carrier		12	
ACMAT Bastion		France	Armored personnel carrier		9	
Renecade APC		USA	Armored personnel carrier		12	Gifted from the US
Unknown APC		Unknown			9+	Spotted during the parade on August 7th
Mine Resistant Ambush Protected Vehicles (69+)
Springbuck		South Africa	MRAP		12	
Mamba APC		South Africa	MRAP		10	
RG-31 Nyala		South Africa	MRAP		12	
Otokar Cobra II		Turkey	MRAP		20+	
VP11		China	MRAP		15+	
Light vehicles
BRDM-2		Soviet Union	Amphibious armored scout car		13	Imported in 2003 from Belarus.
Cayman		Belarus	Amphibious armored scout car		5	Belarus variant of BRDM-2, 8 vehicles including for police delivered in 2018.
Dongfeng EQ2050		China	Light utility vehicle		46+	
Unknown LTV		Unknown	Light utility vehicle		4+	Spotted during the parade on August 7th
Mitsubishi L200		Japan	Light utility vehicle		Unknown	
ACMAT VLRA		France	Light utility vehicle		Unknown	
Toyota Land Cruiser		Japan	Light utility vehicle		Several hundred	
Can Am Maverick		Canada	buggy		4+	Spotted during the parade on August 7th.
Unknown Motorcycle		Unknown	Off-road motorcycle		31+	Spotted during the parade on August 7th.
Logistics Vehicles
Mercedes-Benz Zetros		Germany	off-road logistic truc		Unknown	tank transporter and command post
Renault truck K		France	military truck		Unknown	tank transporter
Dongfeng truck		China	military truck		Unknown	field kitchen and cargo
Howo sinotruc 6x6		China	military truck		Unknown	Tanker and command post
Engineering Vehicles (9+)
Husky VMMD		South Africa	véhicule de déminage		2+	All vehicles spotted during the parade on August 7th. (2025)
Case Tractor		USA	véhicule de déminage		1+	All vehicles spotted during the parade on August 7th. (2025)
Liebherr R 922 Litronic		Germany	Excavator		1+	All vehicles spotted during the parade on August 7th. (2025)
Liebherr Buldozer		Germany	Bulldozer		1+	All vehicles spotted during the parade on August 7th. (2025)
Unknown Backhoe loader			Backhoe loader		2+	All vehicles spotted during the parade on August 7th. (2025)
HBM Grader		Germany	Grader		2+	All vehicles spotted during the parade on August 7th. (2025)
Scania BGB20		Sweden	recovery vehicle		1+	All vehicles spotted during the parade on August 7th. (2025)
