= SIG 310 =

Swiss submachine game

The SIG MP310 is a submachine gun manufactured in Switzerland, developed from SIG's earlier wood stock MP46 design. Its magazine was able to fold forward 90 degrees under the gun barrel, and it was fitted with a collapsible wire buttstock.

First introduced as the MP48 model in the late 1940s, the wood pistol grip and forestock were replaced in the 1950s with a polymer stock on the MP310. Production ended in 1972.

The SIG MP310's use of precision castings and high quality of manufacture made it an expensive weapon to produce; this expense may have contributed to it not being widely adopted.

== Users ==
Switzerland: The MP310 was adopted by Swiss police forces.
Chile: In service with Chilean Armed Forces and police.

== See also ==
- MAT-49
- Vigneron submachine gun
- Sola submachine gun
