= Foldable machine gun =

Type of submachine gun designed to be folded

A folding or foldable machine gun (or FMG) is a type of submachine gun designed to be folded for concealed carry and can often be disguised.

Examples of foldable machine guns include:

- ARES FMG
- FMG-9
- Hotchkiss Type Universal
- PP-90
- UC-9
