= Hotchkiss Type Universal =

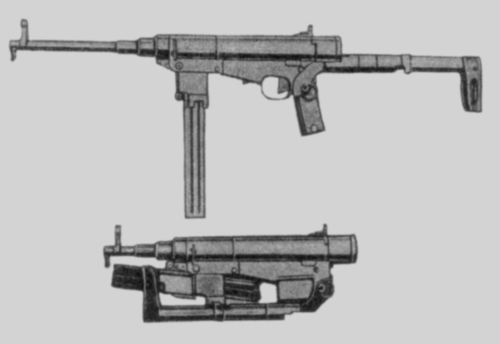
- Type: Submachine gun
- Place of origin: France

Production history
- Designed: 1949
- Manufacturer: Hotchkiss et Cie
- Variants: semi-automatic, full automatic

Specifications
- Cartridge: 9×19mm Parabellum
- Caliber: 9mm
- Barrels: 1
- Action: Blowback
- Feed system: 30/32 round box magazine
- Sights: Iron

The Hotchkiss "type Universal" is a submachine gun manufactured in France after World War II. It was originally designed as a semi-automatic police carbine, but a full automatic version was made. It fires from a closed bolt. Its most notable feature is that it folds up into a very compact package and unfolds easily and relatively quickly. The semi-automatic version was exported in very limited numbers to many countries. Many were also exported to Venezuela and Morocco.

== Users ==
- France: Used by police; issued to foreign legionnaires in Indochina for field testing
- Morocco
- Venezuela

== Conflicts ==
- Indochina War
- Soviet-Afghan War

== See also ==
- List of submachine guns
- Gevarm D4
- MAT-49
- Sola submachine gun
- Vigneron submachine gun
