= Magpul =

American designer and manufacturer of firearms and accessories

Magpul Industries Corporation
- Type: Private
- Industry: Firearms
- Founded: 1999; 27 years ago Boulder, Colorado, U.S.
- Founder: Richard M. Fitzpatrick
- Headquarters: Austin, Texas, U.S.
- Key people: Richard M. Fitzpatrick; Mike Mayberry; Doug Smith
- Products: Accessories
- Owner: Richard M. Fitzpatrick
- Website: magpul.com

Magpul Industries Corporation is an American designer and manufacturer of high-tech polymer and composite firearms accessories like M-LOK. Magpul Industries takes its name from its first product, the MagPul (Magazine Puller), an accessory for the STANAG magazines used by NATO armed forces, which aids users in pulling magazines from pouches.

Originally based in Boulder, Colorado, Magpul announced its intention to leave the state in 2013 when a proposed high-capacity magazine law would cause many of its products to become illegal in Colorado. After passage of the law, Magpul relocated its production facilities to Wyoming and corporate offices to Austin, Texas.

== Background ==
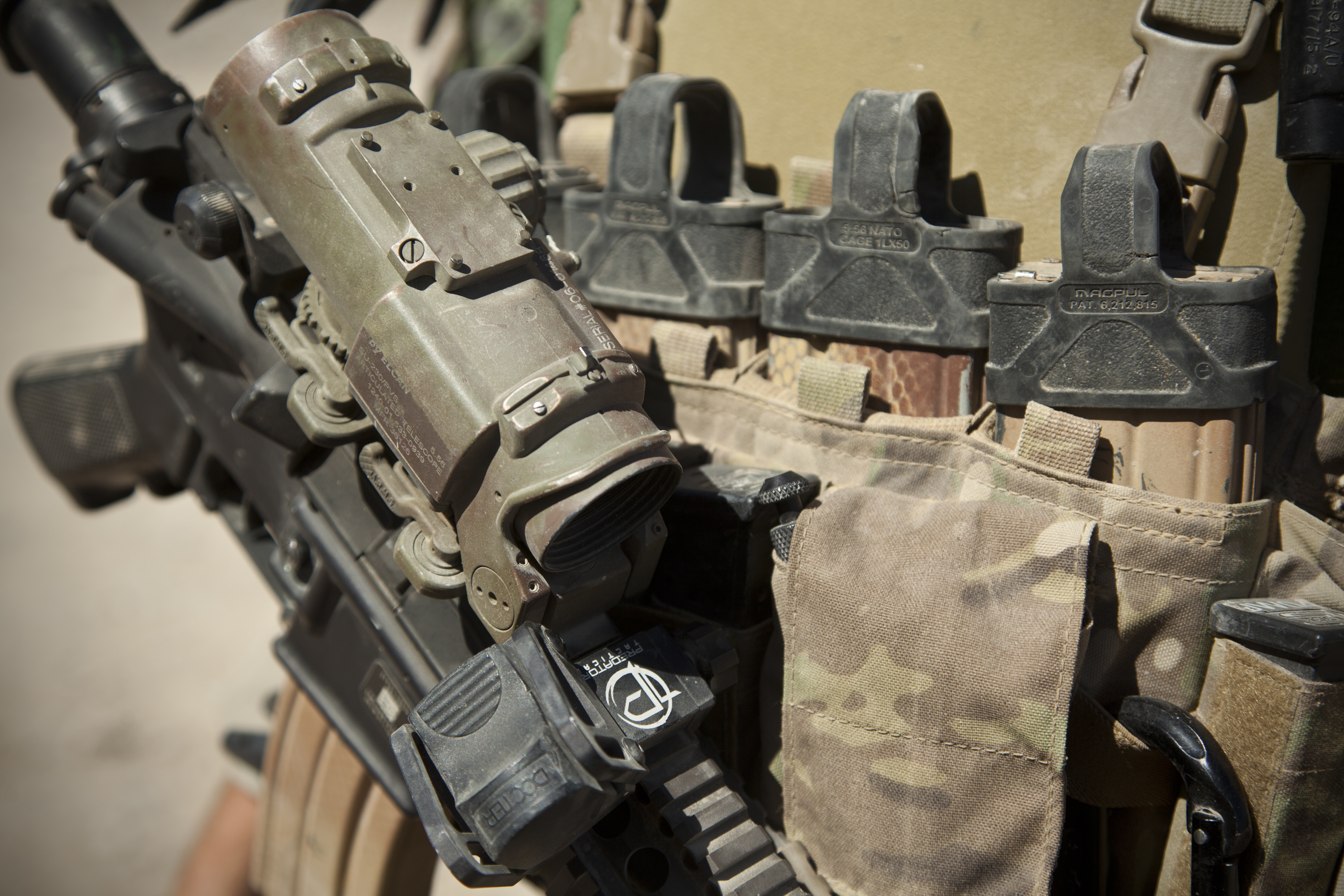
Magpul's eponymous magazine pullers

Magpul Industries was founded in 1999 by Richard M. Fitzpatrick, a Force Recon sergeant with the US Marine Corps. The company has two divisions: Magpul Industries, which manufactures firearms accessories and Magpul Core which was founded in 2008 as Magpul Dynamics. Magpul Core provides firearms training and produces instructional videos.

Magpul primarily designs, manufactures and distributes polymer magazines, accessories and gun parts for AR-15/M16/M4, AK-47/AK74, Steyr AUG, and Heckler & Koch G36 rifles, and Remington 870 and Mossberg 500 shotguns. Magpul has also expanded into rifle chassis production for the Remington 700, Ruger 10/22 and Ruger American Rifle, as well as magazines and accessories for Glock and SIG Sauer pistols.

=== Chronology ===
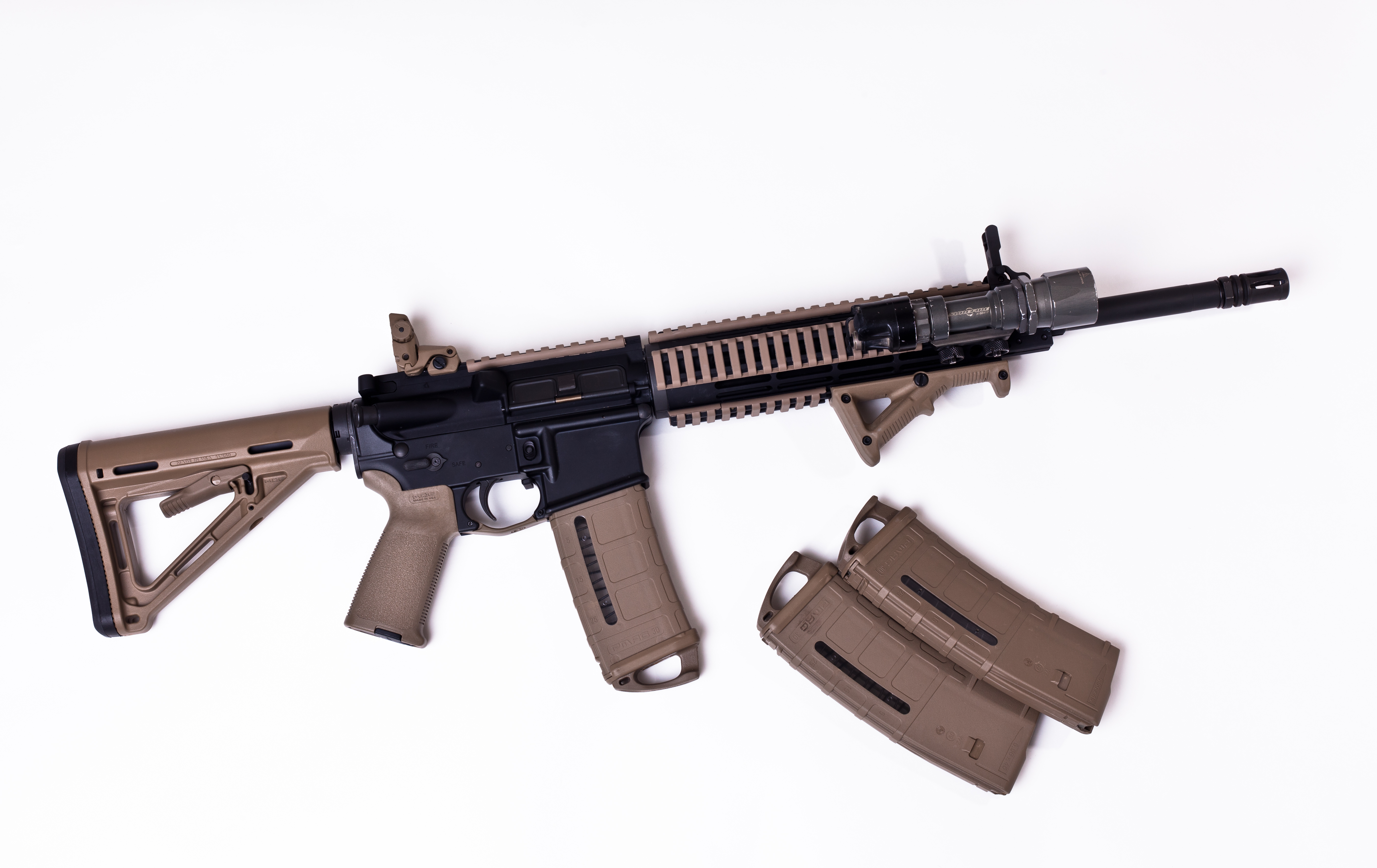
AR-15 outfitted with Magpul's MOE stock (similar but not identical to the company's CTR stock), MOE pistol grip and trigger guard, MBUS rear sight, PMAG magazines, ladder rail panels, and AFG foregrip; the PMAGs themselves have been outfitted with the company's Ranger Plate magazine floorplates

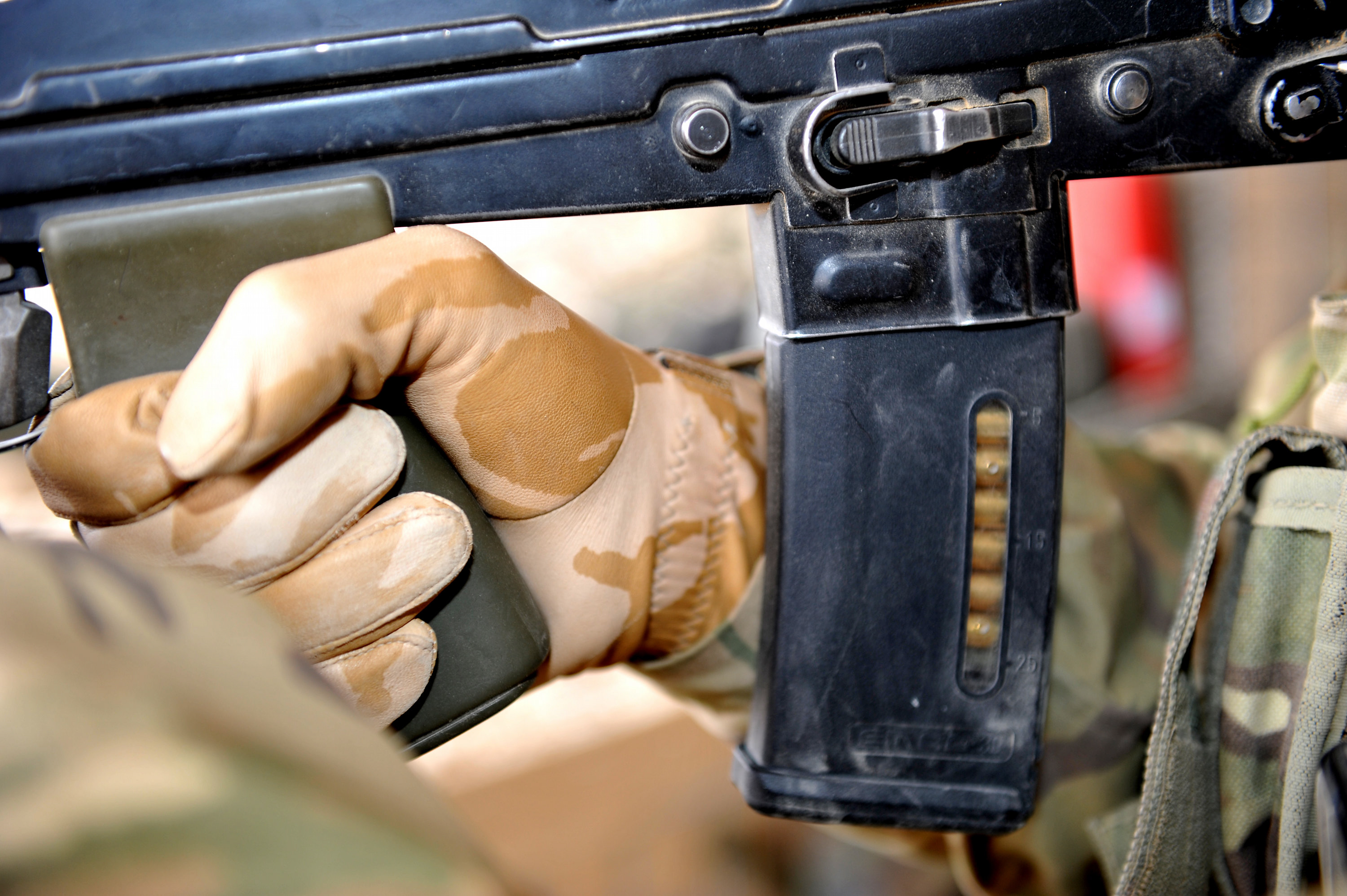
British L85A2 rifle fitted with a 30-round Magpul EMAG box magazine

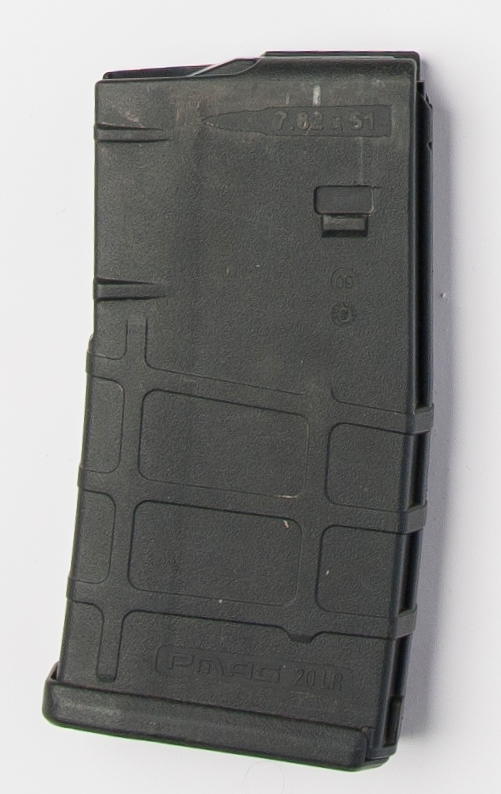
7.62×51mm PMAG as used with the LMT L129A1 rifle

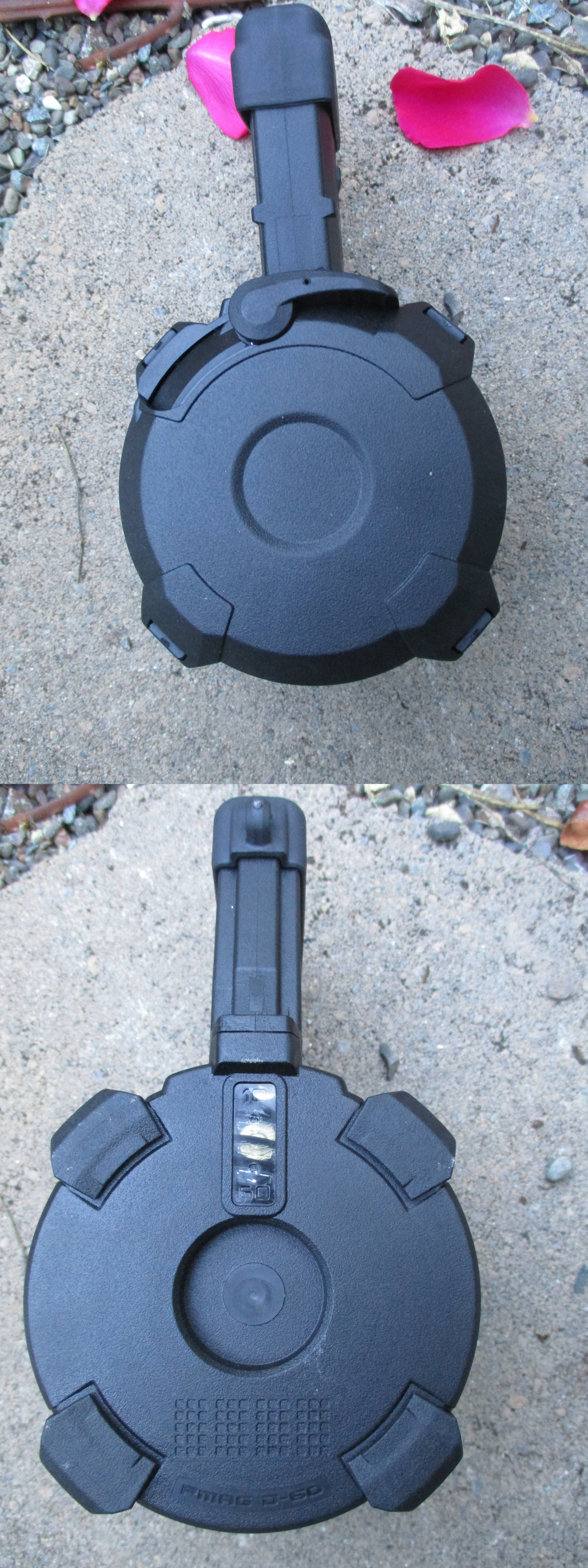
Magpul D-60 drum magazine

1999: Richard Fitzpatrick develops the original Magpul 5.56 and introduces it at NDIA.

2000: The Magpul 7.62 and Magpul 9mm are introduced.

2001: First Magpul patent is awarded.

2002: First official military order with 100 M93 stocks purchased for the US Marine Corps.

2003: Magpul moves out of Fitzpatrick's home to official offices and its first employee, Doug Smith, is hired.

2004: The Magpul Ranger Plate, Self Leveling Follower, and MIAD (MIssion ADaptable grip) are introduced.

2005: Additional magazine accessories are introduced, as well as the company's second stock; the PRS.

2006: Magpul receives its first official NATO Stock Number, and their products are featured in the movie Mission: Impossible III.

2007: The PMAG 30 magazine for the AR-15/M16s, UBR stock, and Masada Adaptive Combat Rifle are introduced at SHOT Show.

2008: The MOE (Magpul Original Equipment) line, Magpul PDR concept, FMG9, and Magpul Massoud are introduced. The Magpul Dynamics training division is formed.

2009: The EMAG (Export MAGazine), designed to fit other STANAG 4179-compliant weapons such as the HK416 and SA80 is introduced, as well as several other products such as the MBUS (Magpul Back-Up Sights).

2010: Magpul wins a bid with the UK Ministry of Defence for 1,000,000 EMAGs to be delivered over a four-year period. Several new products are introduced; including the iPhone Field Case.

2011: The MBUS2 is introduced and is also featured in promos for the video game Battlefield 3. First 100,000 EMAGs of the UK Ministry of Defence contract are delivered to troops in Afghanistan. Magpul sponsors a truck called "Bam-Bam" in the Breslau Adventure Rallye.

2012: The PMAG 30 Gen 3 is released in fall as a synthetic magazine compatible for all STANAG 4179-type rifles, from AR-15 rifles to weapons that previously would need EMAGs.

2015: The Hunter 700 adjustable rifle stock, designed to fit the Remington 700 short action rifle, is introduced at SHOT Show in January.

2016: Magpul was awarded an exclusive contract to manufacture magazines for the US Marine Corps.

2018: Formal announcement that units in the U.S. Army could use procurement funds to acquire PMAGs.

2019: Magpul introduced the PMAG D-50 LR/SR GEN M3. Lightweight and with a 50-round capacity, the polymer drum magazine was designed for 7.62x51 mm NATO/.308 Winchester ammunition for SR25/M110 pattern rifles.

2020: Magpul released the PMAG D-50 EV9 and the PMAG D-50 GL9 - PCC.

2021: From 11-17 January 2021, Magpul held "Magpul week", wherein they revealed a new product each day of the week. Most significantly, this included the FDC-9 and FDP-9, redesigned versions of the prototype Magpul FMG-9, set for release in 2022.

== Firearms ==
=== Magpul Masada ===
First introduced to the public at the 2007 SHOT Show, the Magpul Masada began as an evolutionary upgrade to the AR-15/M16 rifle, but the only parts that retain commonality with the standard AR-15 and M16 rifle are the barrel, fire control group and front sight post.

In January 2008, the design of the Magpul Masada was licensed to Bushmaster Firearms International with the civilian version of the Masada branded as the Bushmaster ACR.

=== Magpul Massoud ===
A cancelled prototype, the Magpul Massoud was a 7.62mm caliber semi-automatic rifle with the possibility of .300 Winchester Magnum and .338 calibers. A prototype was test fired, and strongly resembles the Magpul Masada. It may use of some of the same parts as the ACR, including stocks and possibly forearms. Details of the operating system are closely guarded, however, it is believed to be a short stroke gas piston operation and use 7.62×51mm NATO 20-round variants of the Magpul PMag. It uses a MIL-STD-1913 rail system with monolithic receiver. The name was chosen in honor of Ahmad Shah Massoud, the famous resistance leader of the Afghan Northern Alliance who was killed two days prior to the September 11 attacks. A new prototype rifle based on the Massoud, the FOX-42 from Kinetic Research Group was in development in 2015.

=== Magpul PDR ===
The Magpul PDR is a conceptual 5.56mm caliber personal defense weapon which utilizes a bullpup design principle. The weapon uses STANAG magazines and fire the same type of ammunition as the M16. The purpose of the Magpul PDR is to better arm support personnel who would normally carry M9 pistols without adding any strain to current armed forces logistics with proprietary ammunition.

=== Magpul FMG-9 ===
Magpul designed a folding 9mm caliber submachine gun similar to the ARES FMG which was first publicly unveiled at the 2008 SHOT Show. The FMG-9 never saw production, but during 2021's Magpul week, Magpul released the FDC-9 (Folding Defensive Carbine) and FDP-9 (Folding Defensive Pistol), redesigned versions of the FMG-9.

== Political activity ==
=== Farewell to Arms Freedom Festival ===
In response to Colorado's House Bill 13-1224, which banned large-capacity magazines in the wake of the 2012 Aurora theatre shooting, the group Free Colorado organized the "Farewell to Arms Freedom Festival" to raise funds for recall efforts against several Colorado politicians involved with its passage. Magpul donated 20,000 magazines to Free Colorado for the event to be sold at discounted prices. Of those, one magazine was given away for free to the first 1,500 individuals over the age of 18 to arrive at the event which drew thousands of supporters.

=== Relocation ===
In 2013, Magpul published a newspaper ad stating that it would move out of Colorado if the state legislature enacted a law banning magazines with more than 15 rounds and semi-automatic rifle add-ons. After the law was passed, the company announced on January 2, 2014 that it was moving its production, distribution, and shipping operations to Cheyenne, Wyoming, and its corporate headquarters to Austin, Texas.

== Legal ==
In May of 2025 a judge granted permission to the victims and families of the 2023 Louisville bank shooting to sue Magpul and others for liability.
