= Gevarm D4 =

- Type: Submachine gun
- Place of origin: France

Production history
- Designed: 1956
- Manufacturer: Gevarm
- No. built: ~ 3–4,000

Specifications
- Mass: 3.3 kg (7.3 lb)
- Length: 782 mm (30.8 in) (stock extended); 535 mm (21.1 in) (stock retracted)
- Barrel length: 233 mm (9.2 in)
- Cartridge: 9×19mm Parabellum
- Caliber: 9 mm
- Action: Blowback
- Rate of fire: 600 rpm
- Feed system: 32 round box magazine
- Sights: Iron

The Gevarm D4 is a submachine gun that was developed in 1956 by the French company Gévarm, a subsidiary of the Gévelot cartridge company. It was used by the French police and manufactured in limited quantities.

Two Gévarm submachine guns were tested by the French Army in February 1957, one a D4 (with a retractable steel stock), and the other a D3 (with a wooden stock). The assessors report concluded that the guns were accurate and comfortable to shoot from the shoulder or hip, and had only minor faults that could be easily corrected. However, since the Army was already committed to the MAT-49, Gavram subsequently only produced between 3,000 and 4,000 D4s, most of which went to the Gendarmerie or to the Customs Service.

== Users ==
- France
- Ivory Coast

== See also ==
- List of submachine guns
- MAT-49
- Sola submachine gun
- Vigneron submachine gun
