= Mk 61 105 mm self-propelled howitzer =

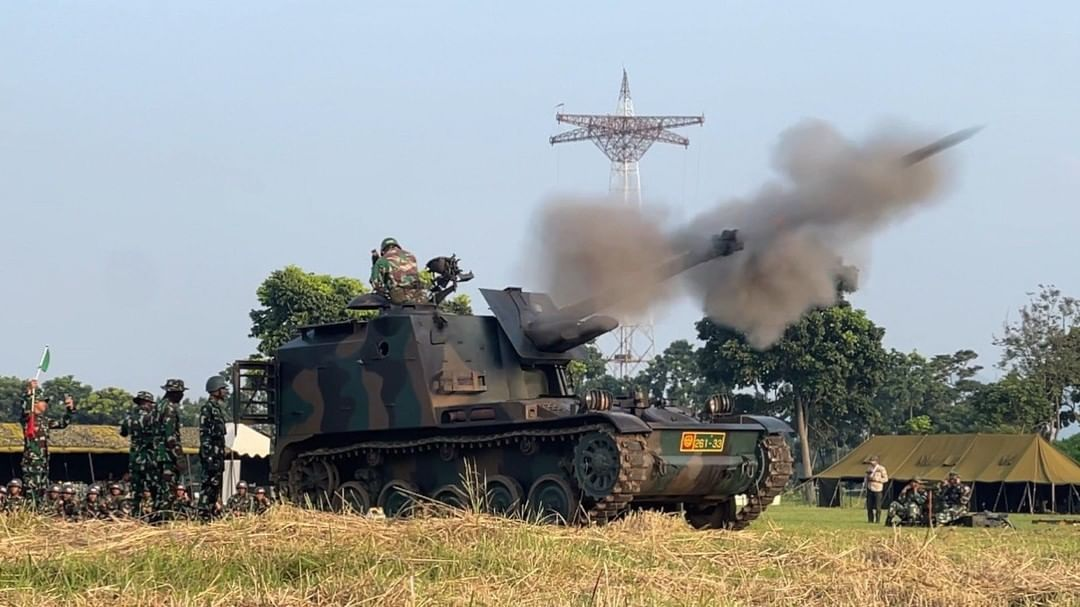
- AMX 105 in Indonesian service
- Type: Self-propelled howitzer
- Place of origin: France

Service history
- Used by: See users
- Wars: Sand War; Six-Day War; Western Sahara War

Production history
- Designer: Atelier de Construction Roanne
- Manufacturer: Atelier de Construction Roanne
- Produced: 1958
- No. built: 550
- Variants: Mk 62

Specifications
- Mass: 16,500 kg (36,400 lb)
- Length: 6.4 m (21 ft)
- Barrel length: 2.4 m (8 ft) L/23 or 3.1 m (10 ft) L/30 (with muzzle brake)
- Width: 2.6 m (8 ft 6 in)
- Height: 2.7 m (8 ft 10 in)
- Crew: 5
- Shell: Semi-fixed 105x372 mm R
- Shell weight: 15 kg (33 lb)
- Caliber: 105 mm (4.1 in)
- Recoil: Hydro-pneumatic
- Elevation: -4° to +66°
- Traverse: 20° R/L
- Rate of fire: 6 rpm
- Muzzle velocity: 580 m/s (1,900 ft/s)
- Maximum firing range: 14.5 km (9 mi)
- Armor: Steel
- Secondary armament: 7.5 or 7.62 mm LMG on a ring mount
- Engine: One SOFAM 8Gxb 8-cylinder water-cooled petrol engine 250 hp (190 kW)
- Power/weight: 15 hp/tonne
- Suspension: Torsion bar
- Operational range: 349 km (217 mi)
- Maximum speed: 60 km/h (37 mph)

The Mk 61 105 mm self-propelled howitzer was a French self-propelled artillery piece designed and built during the late 1950s for the French Army.

== History ==
During World War II a number of nations produced self-propelled artillery. These ranged from heavily armored assault guns with 360° protection to lightly armored open topped tank-destroyers and self-propelled guns. Often the chassis for these conversions came from tanks or artillery tractors and two such vehicles were the US-built M7 Priest and M12 gun motor carriage supplied to Free French forces during World War II. During the 1950s France began a rearmament program to replace both of these guns to provide mobile artillery support for their mechanized divisions. Like in World War II, the chassis for these new weapons was a light tank, the French AMX-13.

== Design ==
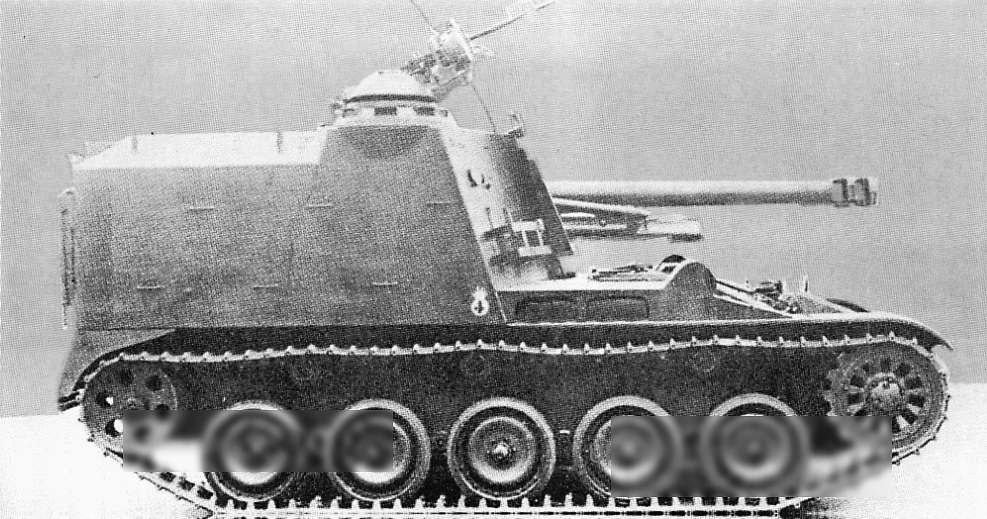
AMX 105 mm howitzer prototype

The new vehicle had the same five-wheeled torsion bar suspension with front drive sprocket, rear idler and three return rollers as the AMX-13. The road wheels had solid rubber tires and the metallic tracks could be fitted with rubber traction blocks to lessen damage to roads. An all-welded box-shaped steel superstructure was mounted to the rear of the vehicle to provide 360° of protection from small arms rifle fire and shell splinters. Although protected from all directions the vehicle lacks NBC (nuclear, biological, chemical) capability and is not amphibious. The engine and transmission are at the front of the vehicle and the driver is on the left. The gun compartment has a commanders cupola with a periscope and 360° vision blocks. The cupola also has a ring mount for an external 7.5 or 7.62 mm light machine gun (LMG). The gun compartment also has access hatches at the top and rear.

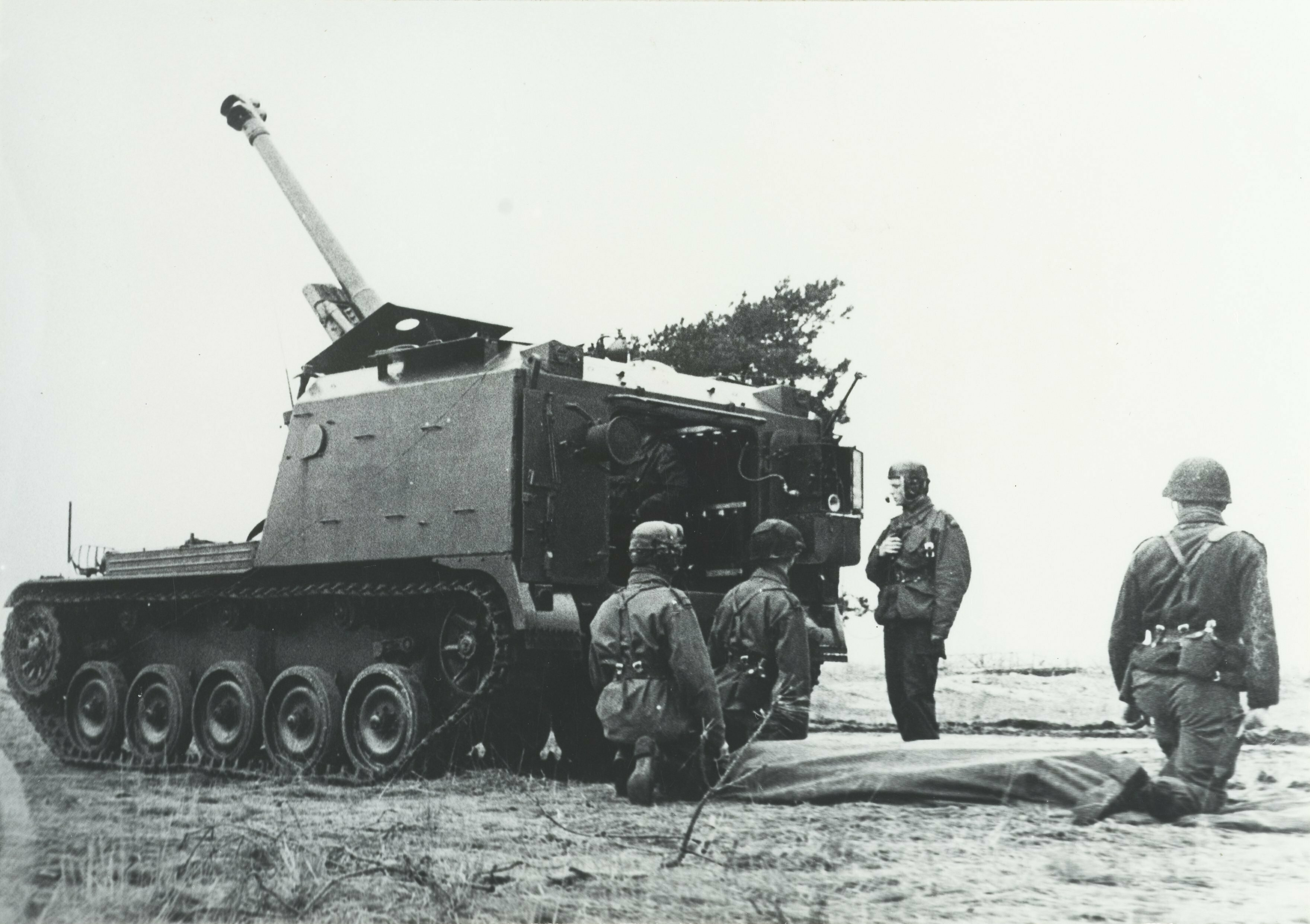
In position ready to fire

The primary armament for the vehicle is an Obusier de 105 modèle 1950 howitzer with a wide range of elevation -4° to +66° but with limited traverse 20° right and left. Traverse and elevation are both manual. French, Israeli, and Moroccan vehicles have a gun barrel which is 23 calibers in length while Dutch vehicles have a barrel 30 calibers in length. Both have a hydro-pneumatic recoil system below the barrel and both are fitted with a double-baffle muzzle brake. The gun fires semi-fixed 105 mm (4 in) ammunition and 55 rounds of ammunition can be carried in the gun compartment. Generally, 6 of the 55 rounds were high-explosive anti-tank warhead (HEAT) with the remaining rounds being HE (high explosive). The HEAT round could penetrate 350 mm (14 in) of armor at an incidence of 0° or 105 mm (4 in) or armor at 65°.

The Mk 61 has more than likely been retired by its users and replaced by either 122 mm (4.8 in) or 155 mm (6 in) self-propelled artillery capable of 360° fire.

== Mk 62 ==
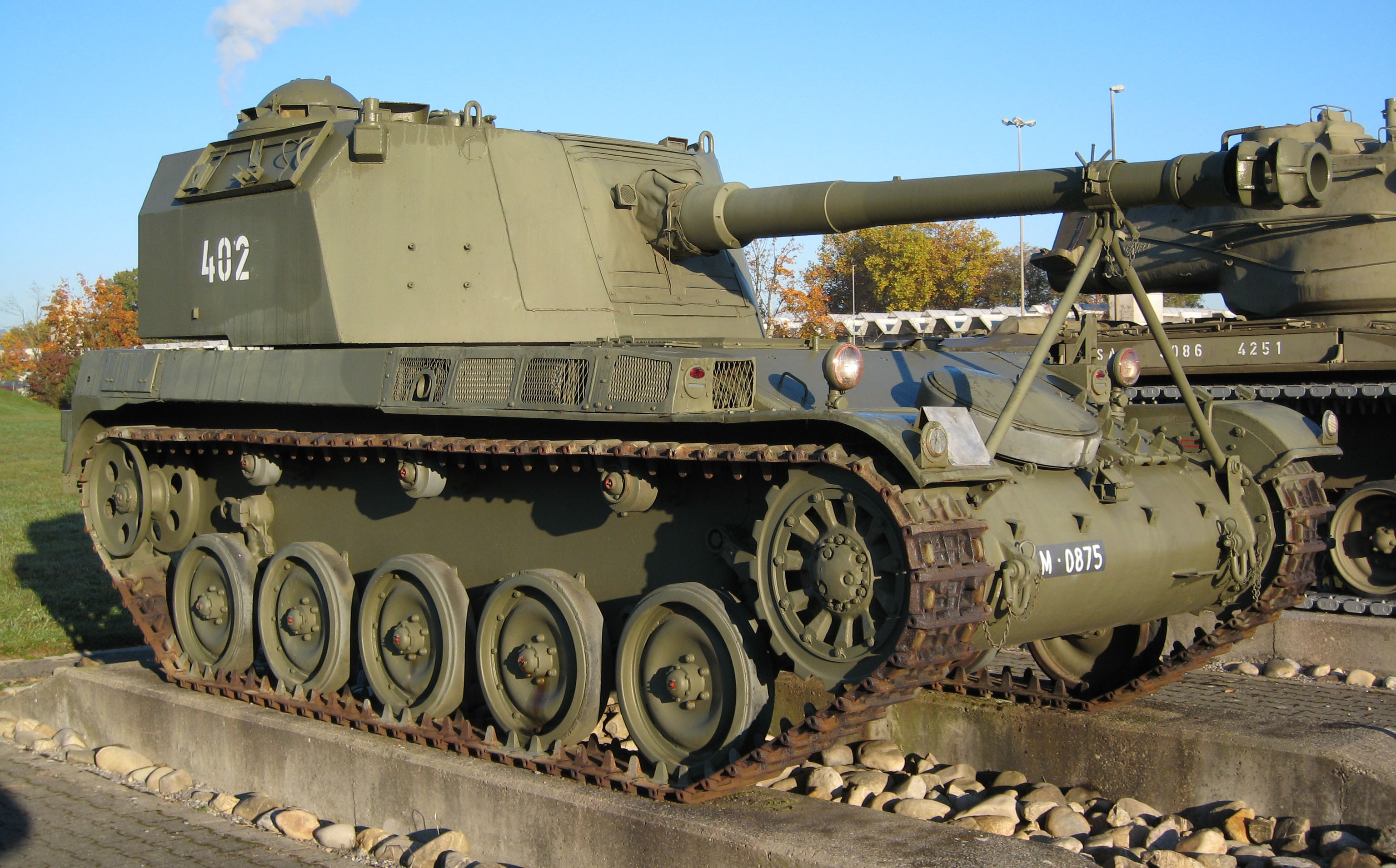
The Swiss Mk 62 at the Thun tank museum

The Mk 62 was an updated variant which had a longer barrel and featured a turret capable of traversing 360°. It was offered to Switzerland and although it was tested by the Swiss military, the Mk 62 was not adopted by them. It is believed that four Swiss Mk 62 SPGs were offered in the trails. One Swiss Mk 62 was preserved at the tank museum in Thun, Switzerland. An additional units is known to be in private collection in the United States as of mid-2024, video of that unit can be found on popular video streaming sites.

== Users ==
- France
- Israel
- Indonesia
- Morocco
- Netherlands

== Photo gallery ==
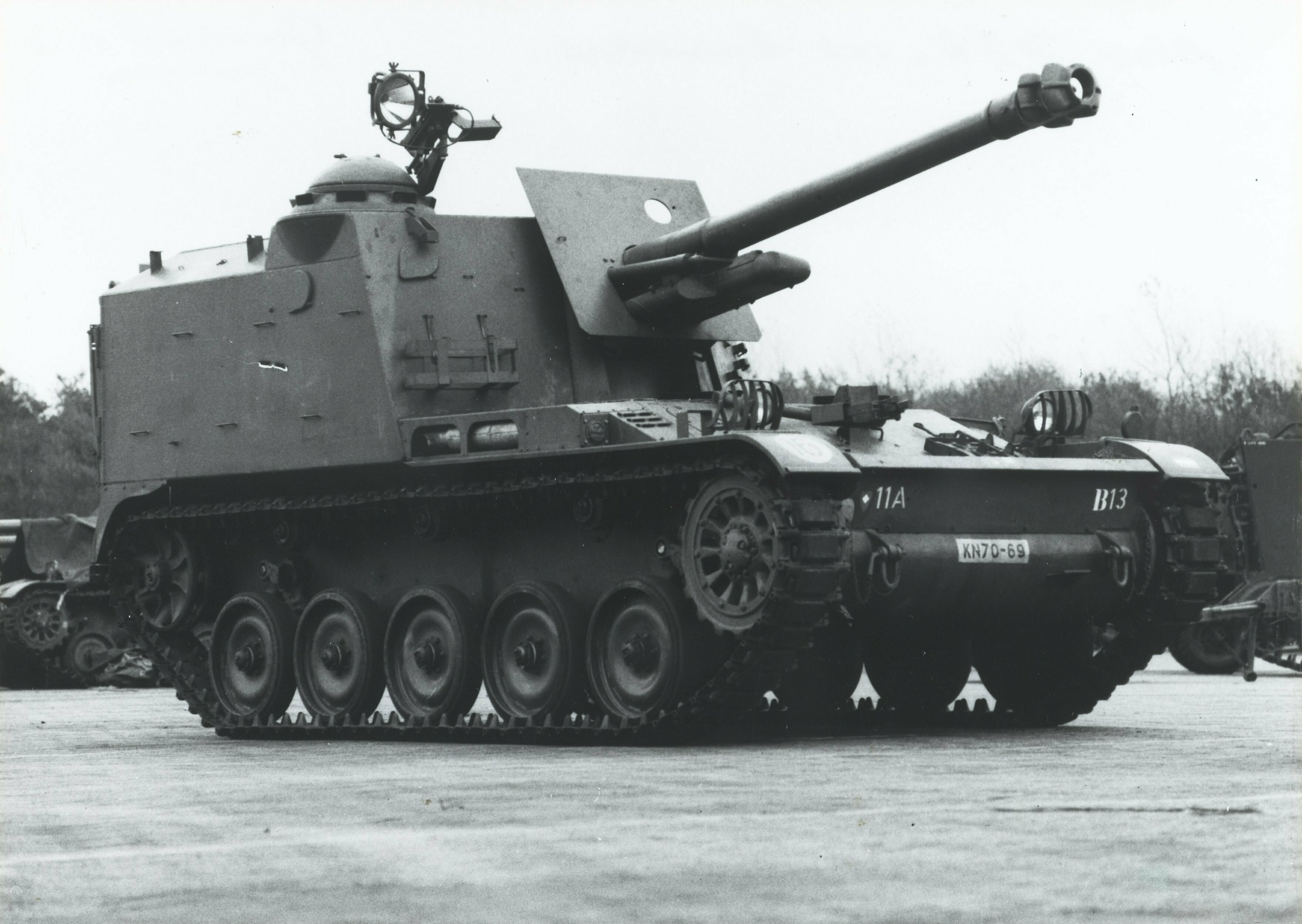
AMX 105 in Dutch service

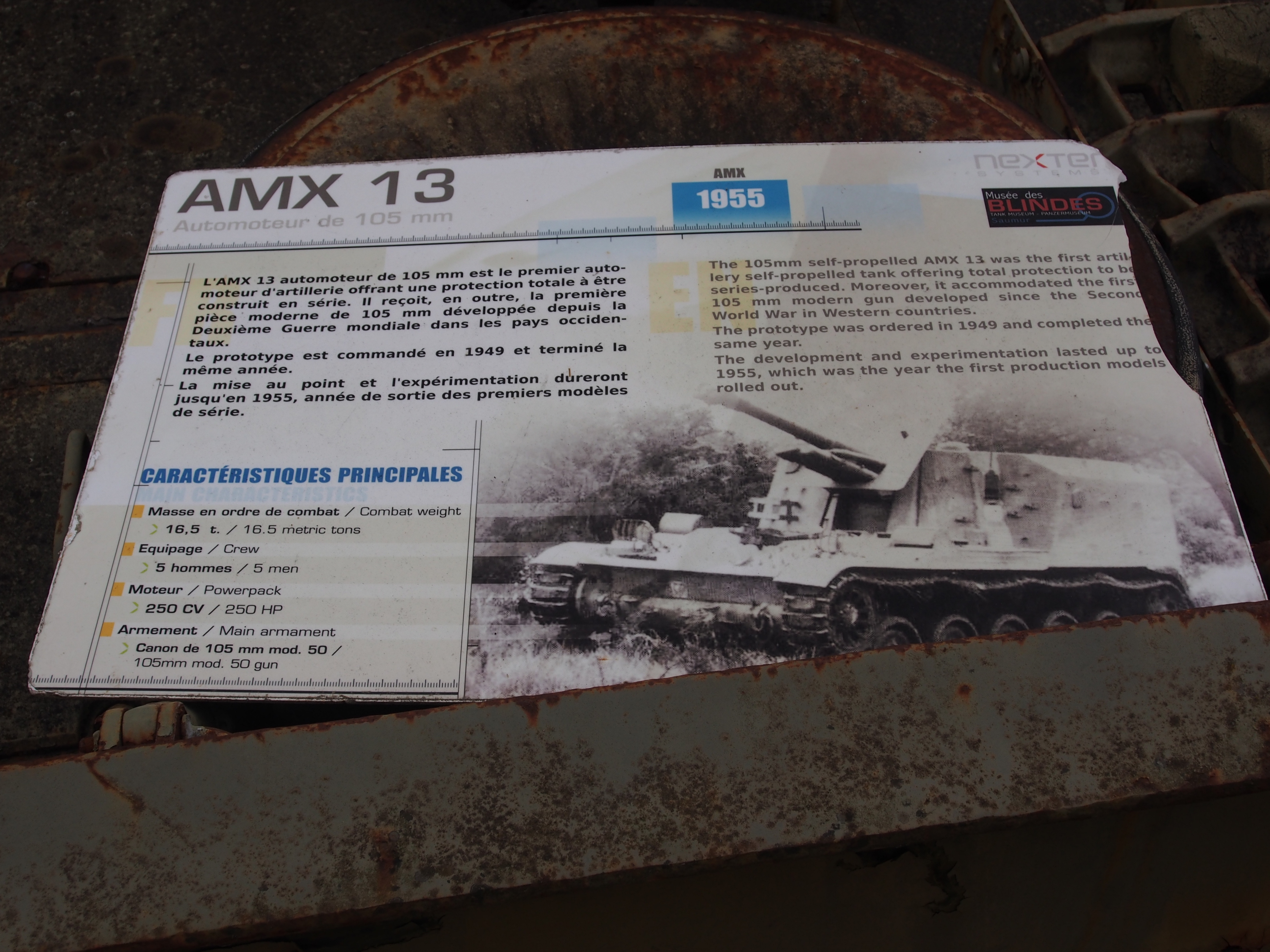
The Mk 61 placard at the Musée des Blindés, France.

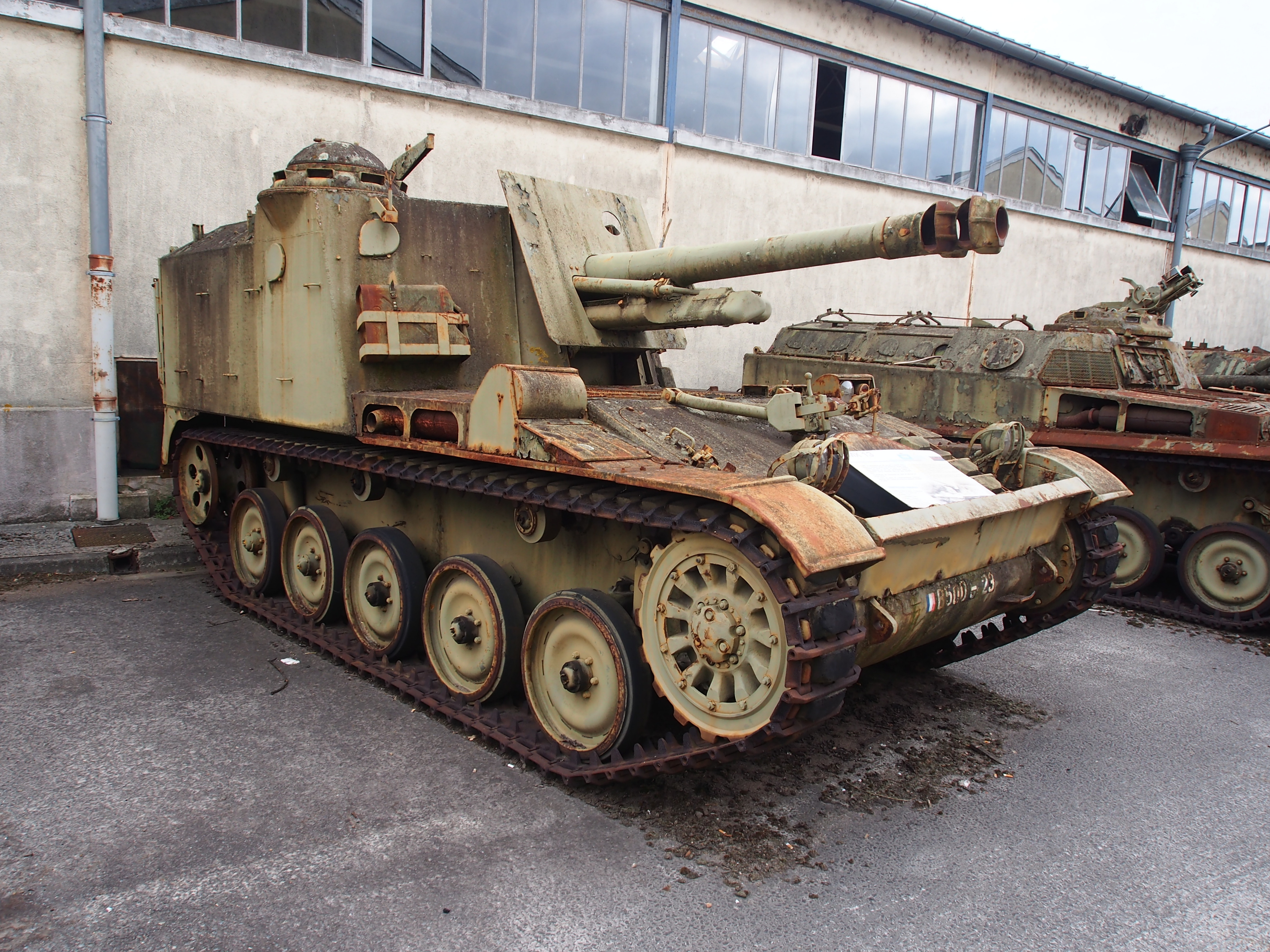
A Mk 61 at the Musée des Blindés, France.

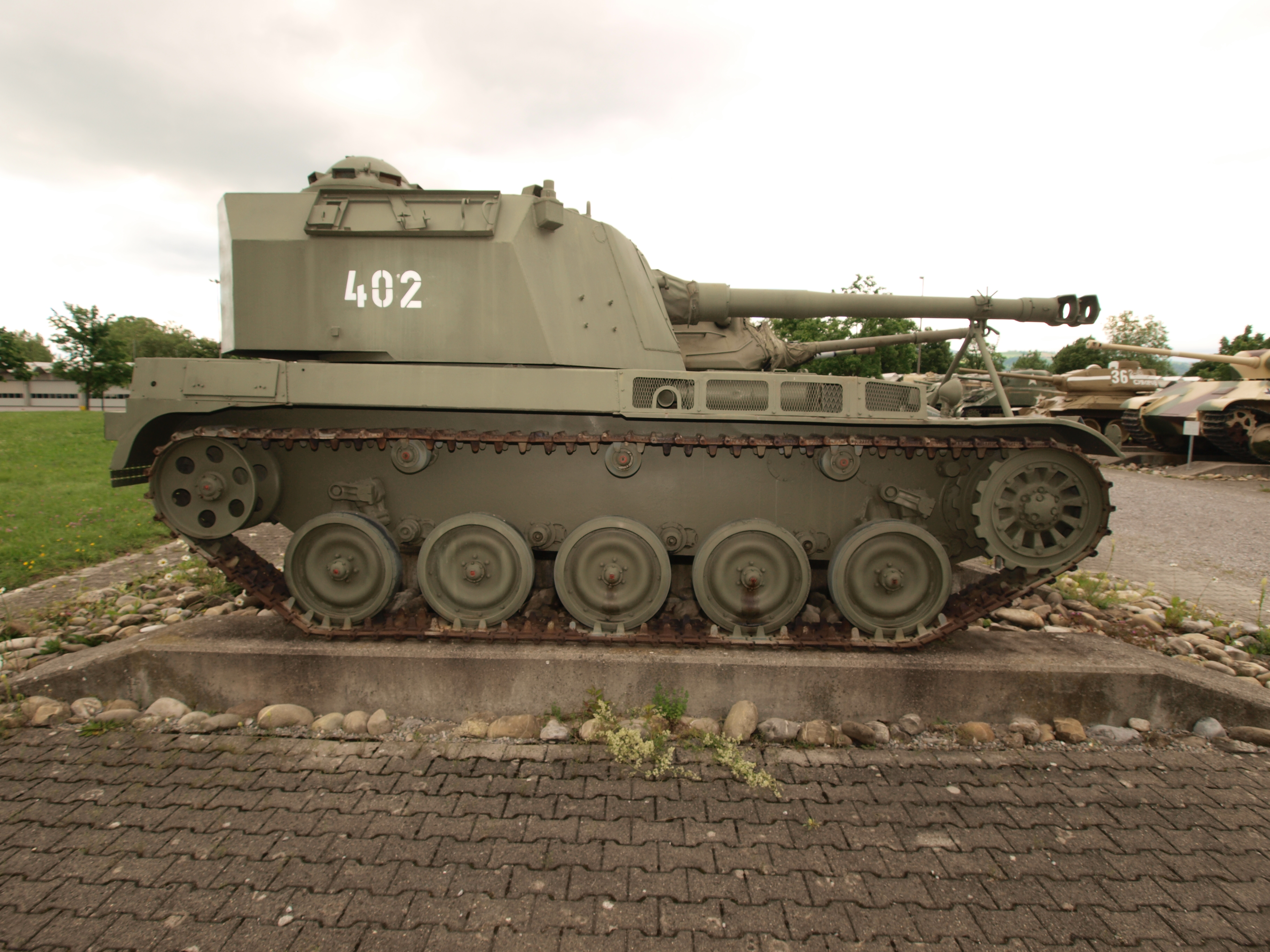
A Mk 62 on display at the Thun Army base in Switzerland.
