= PP-90 =

Russian submachine gun

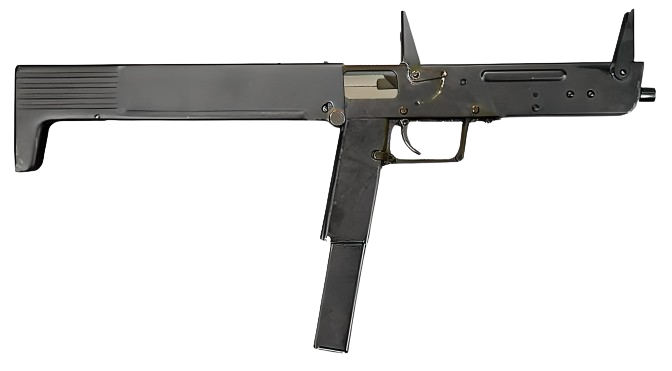
- Type: Submachine gun
- Place of origin: Soviet Union

Service history
- In service: 1990–present
- Used by: Russia

Production history
- Designer: KBP Instrument Design Bureau
- Designed: 1990s
- Manufacturer: KBP Instrument Design Bureau
- Variants: PP-90M, PP-92

Specifications
- Mass: 1.83 kg (4.03 lb) (empty); 2.23 kg (4.9 lb) (loaded)
- Length: 490 mm (19.3 in) (unfolded)
- Barrel length: 200 mm
- Width: 32 mm (1.3 in)
- Cartridge: 9×18mm Makarov
- Action: Blowback
- Rate of fire: 600–700 rounds/min
- Muzzle velocity: Approx. 320 m/s (1,050 ft/s)
- Effective firing range: 100 meters
- Feed system: 30-round detachable box magazine
- Sights: Rear notch, post front sight

The PP-90 is a Russian 9 mm folding submachine gun, developed by the KBP Instrument Design Bureau in Tula for use with special units of the Russian Ministry of Internal Affairs (MVD). It is designed for close quarters combat, particularly engagements that require the weapon to be deployed rapidly in unusual circumstances.

== Design ==
The PP-90 (short for Pistolet-pulemet obrazets 1990, Russian: ПП-90 – Пистолет-пулемет, "Machine Pistol model of 1990") is an automatic-only weapon that uses the straight blowback method of operation, chambered for the 9×18mm Makarov cartridge. The weapon bears a conceptual resemblance to the 9×19mm FMG submachine gun made by the American company Ares.

The PP-90 can be divided into the following groups: the receiver (which houses the barrel, bolt, return mechanism, safety, and fire selector), the pistol grip/magazine well, and the stock. When carried in the stowed position (the bolt is in its forward, closed position) the pistol grip and magazine are folded under the barrel in line with the bore axis and covered by the folded stock body. The folded weapon resembles a cuboid with the following dimensions – 270 × 90 × 32 mm, devoid of any protruding elements, enabling easy concealment. To ready the weapon for firing the stock is pivoted out (simultaneously the pistol grip with magazine, trigger and trigger guard deploy), the safety is disengaged and the bolt cocked. The bolt’s cocking handle is placed at the rear end of the receiver housing and is accessed from beneath the stock.

During the design phase, emphasis was placed on safety when operating the weapon; the internal mechanisms are configured to ensure that it is impossible to discharge the firearm in its folded position or when the stock is not fully deployed. The PP-90 also has a manual safety and fire selector switch. The safety toggle, installed on the left side of the receiver housing, has two settings: a top “P” position – indicating the weapon is safe and the bottom “O” setting – for automatic fire. The "safe" setting mechanically disables the bolt catch. The weapon’s internal safety mechanism also features a drop safety that prevents it from being discharged when dropped with a loaded chamber.

The submachine gun is fed from a detachable 30-round box magazine, placed in a well inside the hollowed pistol grip. The magazine catch is located in the heel of the pistol grip.

For aimed firing the PP-90 uses flip-up iron sights (notch and front post); these are made from thin sheet metal and fold down to lie flush against the receiver housing top cover. The barrel's muzzle is also threaded and will take a sound suppressor.

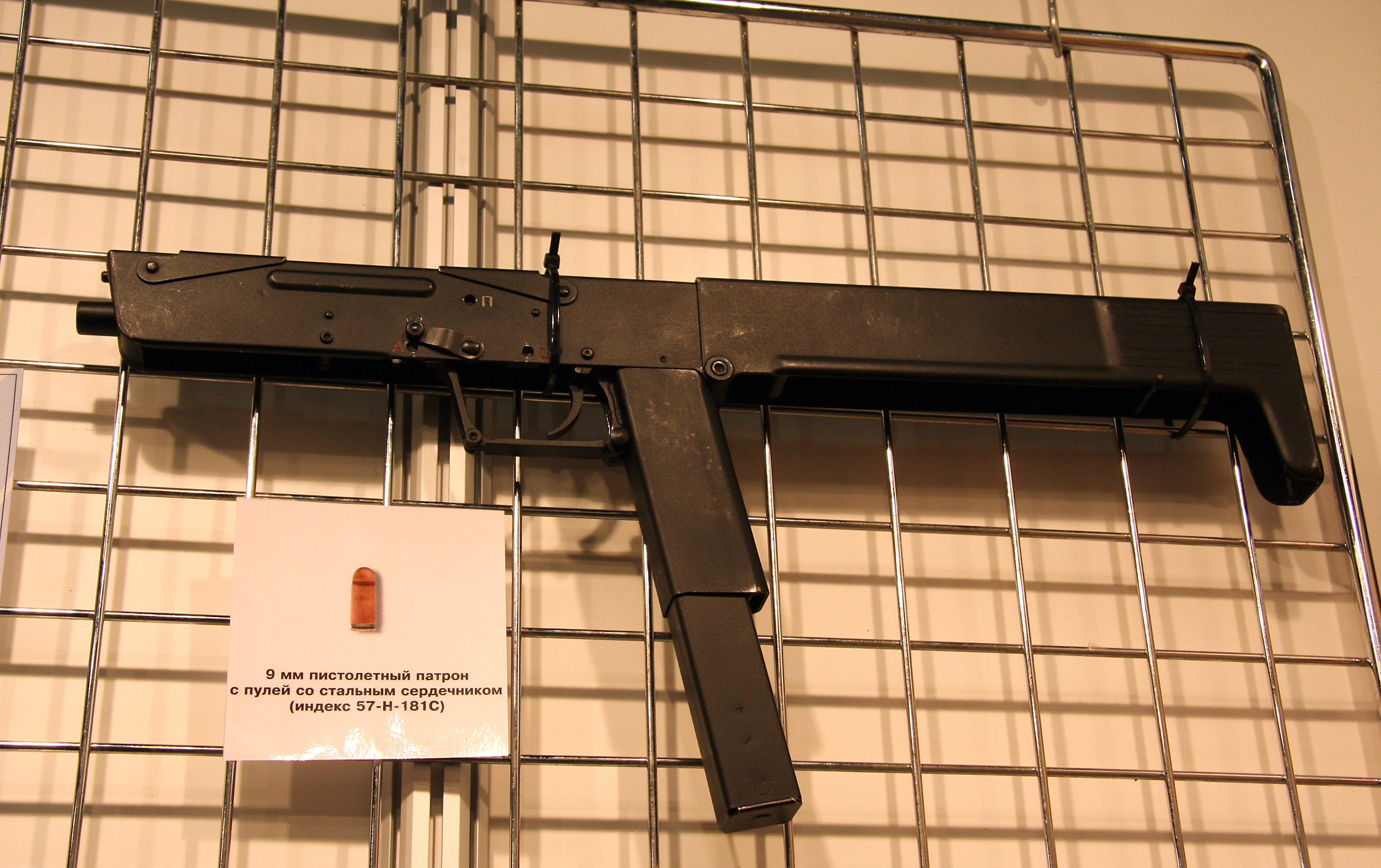
PP-90M - Interpolitex-2009

The submachine gun with spare magazines and a cleaning brush is carried in a holster that can be slung from a duty belt or shoulder rig. The weapon can also be used with a sling.

== Variants ==
- A version of the PP-90 chambered in the 9×19mm Parabellum pistol cartridge is known as the PP-92.
- A selective fire version has also been developed, designated PP-90M.
- A non-folding version, designated PP-93.

== See also ==
- Magpul FMG-9
