= Pistolet-pulemet =

Pistolet-pulemet (Пистоле́т-пулемёт) means submachine gun in Russian. The name is most often used in relation to a series of weapons made by the Soviet Union which includes PPD-40, PPSh-41 and PPS-43. The letter after the PP (ПП) in the gun's designation is from the designer's name. For example, the "Sh" in PPSh stands for Shpagin (Russian: Шпагин).

This name is also used in submachine guns manufactured in Russian Federation. For example, PP-19 Bizon, PP-93 and PP-2000.
