= Magpul FMG-9 =

American folding machine pistol

- Type: Gun, Folding pistol
- Place of origin: United States

Production history
- Designed: 2008
- Manufacturer: Magpul Industries

Specifications
- Mass: 0.5 kg (1.1 lb)
- Length: 503 mm (19.8 in) (extended); 262 mm (10.3 in) (folded)
- Barrel length: 168 mm (6.6 in)
- Cartridge: 9×19mm Parabellum
- Action: Blowback
- Rate of fire: About 1200 rpm
- Muzzle velocity: 380 m/s
- Feed system: 32-round box magazine or 33 round box magazine

The Magpul FMG-9 is a prototype folding gun, designed by Magpul Industries in 2008.

== History ==
The FMG-9 never left the prototype stage, and never saw widespread production on any level, as the item was only produced by Magpul as a proof of concept.

In 2021, however, Magpul unveiled the FDC-9 (Folding Defensive Carbine) and FDP-9 (Folding Defensive Pistol), two redesigned versions of the FMG-9, that were planned to release in 2023.

== Design ==
The FMG-9 is made out of polymer in place of metal, reducing weight. The prototype unveiled by Magpul utilized a Glock pistol as the core of the weapon.

== Variants ==
=== FDP ===
After some delays, Magpul announced in 2024 that the weapon would be launched as FDP (Folding Defensive Platform) in April 2025. After further delays, the gun was eventually released in 2026 in collaboration with firearms manufacturer ZEV Technologies. The gun is available in both pistol and carbine configurations.

=== Airsoft ===
In 2010, Magpul Industries' PTS (Professional Training and Simulation) Division released the FPG (lit. 'Folding Pocket Gun') in cooperation with KWA Performance Industries.

The FPG is almost identical to the FMG-9 prototype, but contains the operating mechanism of an airsoft KWA G18C replica and can fire 6mm pellets with a magazine capacity of 49 rounds.

== See also ==
- Ares FMG – 9mm Parabellum folding submachine gun designed by Francis Warin at Eugene Stoner's company in the mid-1980s
- PP-90 – Russian 9mm Makarov folding submachine gun by KBP (1990s).
- UC-9 - 9mm Parabellum folding submachine gun constructed by Utah Connor using some Uzi parts in the late 1980s
