= Obusier de 105 modèle 1950 =

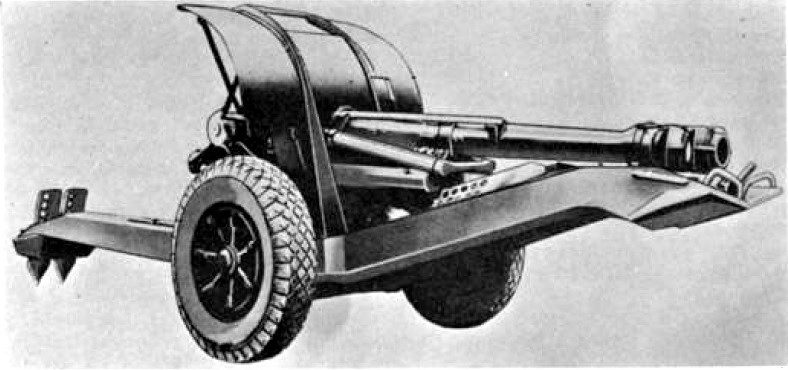
- Type: Howitzer
- Place of origin: France

Service history
- Used by: See users

Production history
- Designer: DEFA
- Designed: 1946
- Manufacturer: DEFA
- Produced: 1950

Specifications
- Mass: 2,922 kg (6,442 lb)
- Length: 6 m (19 ft 8 in)
- Barrel length: 2.4 m (8 ft) L/23 (with muzzle brake)
- Width: 1.9 m (6 ft 3 in)
- Height: 1.7 m (5 ft 7 in)
- Shell: Semi-fixed 105x372 mm R
- Shell weight: 15 kg (33 lb)
- Caliber: 105 mm (4.1 in)
- Recoil: Hydro-pneumatic
- Carriage: Tripod
- Elevation: -7° to +70°
- Traverse: 360°
- Rate of fire: 6 rpm
- Muzzle velocity: 580 m/s (1,900 ft/s)
- Maximum firing range: 14.5 km (9 mi)

The Obusier de 105 modèle 1950 was a French Howitzer designed and built after World War II for the French Army.

== History ==
After World War I the French Army had large numbers of artillery pieces that could trace their origins back to the turn of the century. In the years between the two world wars a number of factors conspired to hinder the modernization of French artillery such as limited budgets, competing priorities (fortifications, tanks, navy, and aircraft), large stocks of ammunition, large stocks of spare guns and complacency about the effectiveness of existing weaponry. These factors meant that France went into World War II with large numbers of old artillery and modernization efforts mainly focused on converting older guns to use motor traction (sprung suspension and pneumatic tires) instead of horse traction.

In the aftermath of World War II, the French Army was equipped with a variety of weaponry. There were French, British, German and US weapons in use. In 1946 DEFA (Direction des Études et Fabrications d'Armament) began a design study to build a new 105 mm howitzer for the French Army to replace its assortment of weapons. It would be the first 105 mm gun designed and built in Western Europe after World War II.

== Design ==
The mle 1950 would be a departure from previous designs because it would feature a three outrigger tripod carriage which was more common for anti-aircraft guns than howitzers. For travel, the gun was towed by one rearward facing outrigger which had a towing eye and two outriggers folded forward for the barrel to rest on. The carriage also had a two-wheeled torsion bar suspension and a curved three-piece gun shield for the crew. Once in firing position, the wheels were raised and the outriggers were spread to form a Y. This allowed a wide range of elevation -7° to +70° as well as 360° traverse similar to the Soviet D30 howitzer. However, unlike the D-30 the mle 1950 had a hydro-pneumatic recoil system mounted below the barrel, it had a double-baffle muzzle brake, and there wasn't a towing eye on the barrel.

== Self-propelled artillery ==
In addition to its towed version the mle 1950 was the primary armament of the Mk 61 105 mm self-propelled howitzer. This consisted of a mle 1950 mounted in a large non-traversing armored casemate on an AMX-13 light tank chassis.

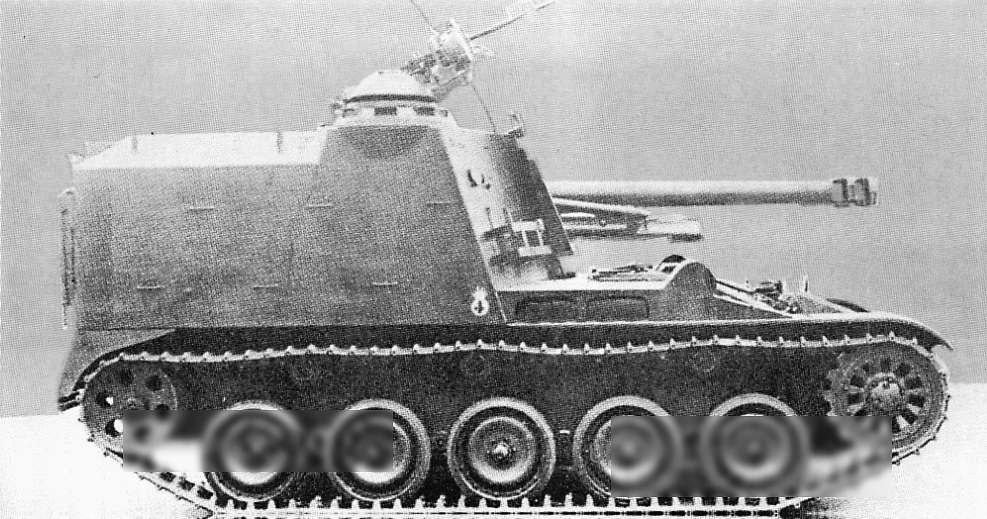
The Obusier de 105 modèle 1950 as equipped on the Mk 61 105 mm self-propelled howitzer

== Users ==
- Cameroon
- France
- Guinea
- Israel
- Ivory Coast
- Morocco
