= ARES FMG =

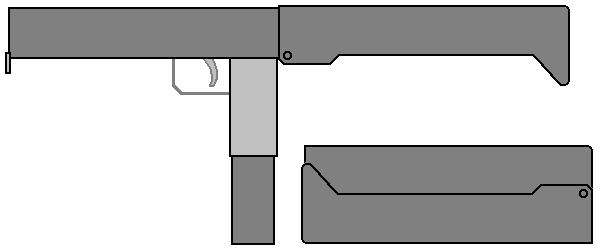
- Unfolded and folded FMGs
- Type: Submachine gun
- Place of origin: United States

Production history
- Designer: Francis Warin
- Designed: 1984
- Manufacturer: ARES Incorporated
- No. built: 2

Specifications
- Mass: 2.09 kg (4.61 lb)
- Length: 503 mm (19.8 in) extended 262 mm (10.3 in) folded
- Barrel length: 220 mm (8.7 in)
- Cartridge: 9×19mm Parabellum
- Action: Blowback
- Rate of fire: 650 rounds/min
- Feed system: 20- or 32-round box magazine

The ARES FMG is a folding submachine gun designed by Francis J. Warin of Oak Harbor, Ohio, while he worked at Eugene Stoner's ARES Inc. Warin designed the gun for concealment and covert use, describing it as a “businessman’s personal defense weapon”. Allegedly, Warin had the idea of a defense weapon for VIPs and CEOs following the numbers of kidnappings of many of such persons in South America during the early 1980s. The FMG never entered full production.

The weapon was unique, in that it is designed to be folded into a box shape, which can be unfolded and made ready to fire in a matter of seconds. When folded, the size is about the same as a cigarette carton, and the appearance is deliberately similar to an old-fashioned metal commercial radio.

The ARES FMG can be folded with its 20-round UZI magazine loaded. A 32-round magazine was also available, but its use prevented folding the weapon. The original prototype was designed to use a World War II German MP40 magazine. The second prototype used UZI magazines and had a three shot burst mechanism as well.

The weapon inspired a Russian, and a Ukrainian copy which are almost identical except for caliber, magazine and folding sights that were added.

While descriptions of a fictional "ARES II FMG" exist on the web, the actual ARES FMG was only chambered in 9×19mm Parabellum.

== Similar weapons ==
- UC-9 – 9×19mm folding submachine constructed by Utah Connor using some Uzi parts in the late 1980s. It was used in the 1990 film RoboCop 2.
- PP-90 – Russian 9×18mm Makarov folding submachine gun by the KBP Instrument Design Bureau in the 1990s.
- Magpul FMG-9 – 9×19mm submachine gun using some Glock parts, unveiled at the 2008 SHOT Show.
