= PP-93 =

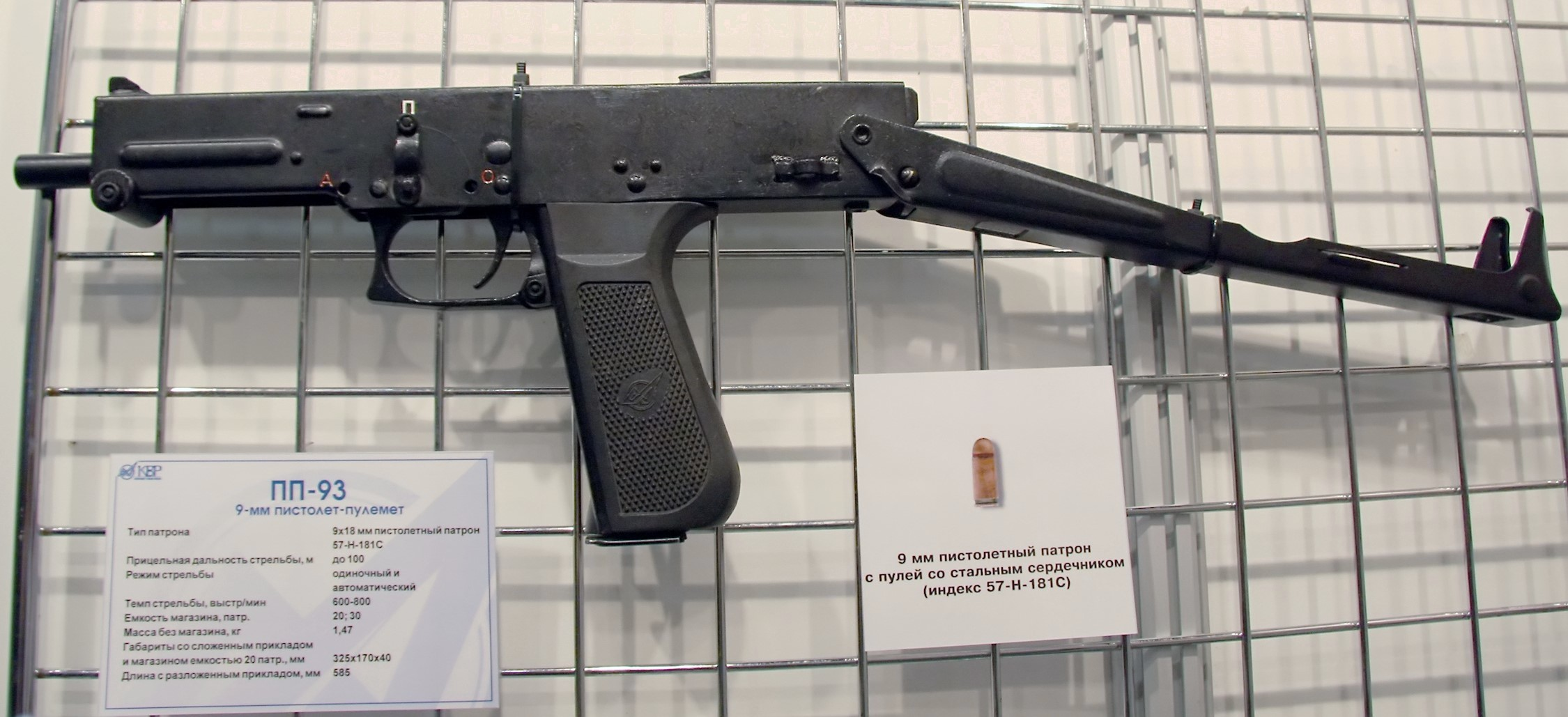
- PP-93 in Interpolitex-2009
- Type: Submachine gun
- Place of origin: Russia

Service history
- In service: 1993
- Used by: See Users

Production history
- Designer: KBP Instrument Design Bureau
- Designed: 1993
- Manufacturer: TsKIB SOO
- Produced: 1993

Specifications
- Mass: 1.47 kg (empty), 1.8 kg (full ammo)
- Length: 577 mm stock open / 325 mm stock closed
- Barrel length: 200 mm
- Width: 40 mm
- Cartridge: 9x18mm Makarov
- Action: Blowback
- Rate of fire: 600 - 800 rounds/min
- Muzzle velocity: 310–315 m/s
- Effective firing range: 100 m
- Feed system: 20 or 30 round detachable box magazine
- Sights: Iron sights

The PP-93 submachine gun was developed in the 1990s at the KBP Instrument Design Bureau in Tula as a non-folding version of earlier PP-90 clandestine submachine gun, for use by security and law enforcement units. It is operated on blowback principle and has good controllability of full automatic fire.

== History ==
The PP-93 was originally developed as an independent project by KBP under the leadership of Vasily Gryazev and Arkady Shipunov , but would later be adapted to fulfill a technical specification laid out by the Ministry of Internal Affairs. It would be adopted and given the designation APB in this role.

== Design ==
Unlike the PP-90 the PP-93 is select fire, with safe, semi- and fully automatic modes controlled by a 180-degree selector lever on the left side. Two grooved knobs under the weapon serve as a non-reciprocating charging handle. The stock folds over the top of the weapon's receiver without increasing its other dimensions, reducing its overall length to 325 mm without increasing its other dimensions.

The PP-93 is of stamped steel construction, with the receiver manufactured from 1 mm thick sheet and the stock from 1.5 mm sheet. It fires from an open bolt, using advanced primer ignition to absorb the bolt's forward momentum during firing and prevent it from impacting the front of the receiver. The bolt also doesn't impact the rear of the receiver, as the recoil spring absorbs its energy before it can reach the extreme rearward position. This helps improve accuracy during automatic fire. When firing in fully-automatic from a standing position, the PP-93 is capable of landing all bullets within a chest-sized target at up to 25 m.

The optional laser aiming device and suppressor are shared with the related PP-90. KBP Tula also offers a shoulder holster, enabling the weapon to be concealed on one's person.

== Users ==
- Russia: Used by rapid response units of riot police (OMON, SOBR) and some other units of the Ministry of Internal Affairs
- Belarus: Used by the special forces
- Mongolia: Used by the Special Forces

== See also ==
- List of Russian weaponry

== Sources ==
- 9-мм пистолет-пулемет. Техническое описание и инструкция по эксплуатации ПП-93.00.000 ТО — 1994 г.
- Прицел лазерный. Паспорт ЛП-93.000 ПС
- А. И. Благовестов. То, из чего стреляют в СНГ: Справочник стрелкового оружия. / под общ. ред. А. Е. Тараса. Минск, «Харвест», 2000. стр.221-223
