= MAT-49 =

Pistolet-Mitrailleur de 9 mm modèle 1949 (MAT-49)
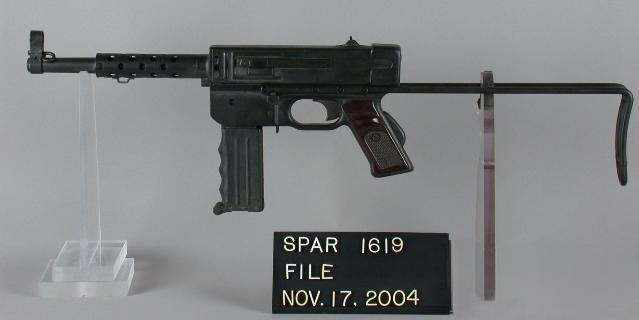
- MAT-49 on display. This weapon has the front grip lowered in firing position, but lacks a magazine.
- Type: Submachine gun
- Place of origin: French Fourth Republic / French Fourth Republic

Service history
- In service: 1949–Present
- Used by: See Users
- Wars: First Indochina War; Korean War; Suez Crisis; 1958 Lebanon Crisis; Algerian War; Vietnam War; Laotian Civil War; Cambodian Civil War; Sino-Vietnamese War; Portuguese Colonial War; Basque conflict Rhodesian Bush War; Western Sahara War; Shaba II; Chadian–Libyan conflict Lebanese Civil War; Algerian Civil War; Libyan Civil War; Syrian Civil War; Mali War; Central African Republic Civil War (2012–present)

Production history
- Designer: Pierre Monteil
- Designed: 1947-1949
- Manufacturer: Manufacture Nationale d'Armes de Tulle; Manufacture d'armes de Saint-Étienne
- Produced: 1949–1973
- No. built: ~ 100,000
- Variants: See Variants

Specifications
- Mass: 3.5 kg (7.7 lb) without magazine 4.2 kg (9.3 lb) with 32-round magazine
- Length: 460 mm (18 in); 720 mm (28 in)
- Barrel length: 230 mm (9.1 in)
- Cartridge: 9×19mm Parabellum; 7.62×25mm Tokarev (PAVN converted)
- Caliber: 9mm
- Action: Blowback, open bolt
- Rate of fire: 600 rounds/min
- Effective firing range: 100 m (110 yd)
- Feed system: 20 or 32 rounds 35 rounds (PAVN converted)
- Sights: Iron sights

The MAT-49 is a submachine gun which was developed by the French arms factory Manufacture Nationale d'Armes de Tulle (MAT) for use by the French Army. It was first produced in 1949 and remained in French service until it was phased out following the adoption of the FAMAS assault rifle in 1979.

== Development ==
In 1949, after evaluating several other submachine gun prototypes (including a collapsible design from Hotchkiss), the French MAT factory began production of the MAT-49 9×19mm Parabellum submachine gun. The MAT-49 used a machine stamping process which allowed for the economical production of large numbers of submachine guns, then urgently required by the French Government for use by Army, French Foreign Legion as well as airborne and colonial forces to meet the need for a compact weapon.

Production continued at MAT until the mid-1960s, then switched to the Manufacture d'armes de Saint-Étienne plant (MAS), where the weapon was produced until 1973. In 1979, the French armed forces adopted the FAMAS 5.56 mm NATO assault rifle, and the MAT-49 was gradually phased out of service.

== Usage ==
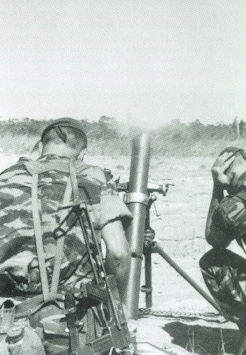
Paratroopers of the 2e REP from the French Foreign Legion storming Kolwezi in 1978.

The MAT-49 saw widespread combat use during the First Indochina War and the Algerian War, as well as the 1956 Suez Crisis. The weapon found considerable favor with airborne forces and mechanized troops, who prized it for its simplicity, ruggedness, firepower and compactness.

After French forces left Indochina, the People's Army of Vietnam and Viet Minh continued to use many captured MAT-49s into the Vietnam War. Some were converted to the Soviet 7.62 mm Tokarev pistol cartridge, then available in large quantities from the Soviet Union and the People's Republic of China. These converted versions could be distinguished by a longer barrel and a higher rate of fire at 900 rpm.

North Vietnam covertly provided MAT-49s to anti-French occupation groups during the Algerian War after the French left Indochina.

== Overview ==
The MAT-49 had a short, retractable wire stock, which when extended gave the weapon a length of 720 mm (28 in), and the magazine well and magazine could be folded forward parallel to the barrel for parachute jump or with a 45° angle hence allowing a safe carry until the magazine well is brought back to vertical position before opening fire. Barrel length is 230 mm (9.1 in), with the MAT-49/54 manufactured with extended barrels and non-retractable wooden stocks. As issued, the MAT-49 fires a 9×19mm Parabellum cartridge, using a single-column 20-round magazine for desert use or 32-round similar to the Sten magazine.

The MAT-49 is blowback-operated and box magazine-fed, with a cyclic rate of fire of 600 rounds per minute. Some of the MAT 49/54s, modified MAT-49s manufactured for police forces, had two triggers, allowing use of full-auto fire or single shots, but most were manufactured as full-auto only. Minus magazine, the MAT-49 weighs about 3.5 kilograms (7.7 pounds), which is heavy for a submachine gun. The weapon incorporates a grip safety which is located on the backside of the pistol grip. The rear sights are flip-up and L-shaped, and marked for a range of 50 and 100 meters (55 and 109 yd). Production ceased before the introduction of the FAMAS assault rifle in 1979.

== Variants ==
- MAS-48 - prototype variant.
- MAT-49 - main variant.
- MAT-49/54 - gendarme variant with extended barrel and fixed wooden stock with a sling bar.
- MAT-49 silenced - variant fitted with a suppressor.
- MAT-49 M - variant modified by the Viet Minh, firing in 7.62×25mm Tokarev. It had a longer barrel, modified 35-round magazine, and a higher rate of fire (900 rpm). It was distinguished from the 9mm version by having a letter "K" stamped on the top of the receiver's endcap and the side of the compatible magazines. Spare parts were still produced in the early 1970s, the gun being used by the Viet Cong.
MAT-49: left and right views; view with stock retracted and magazine in safe position

Police MAT-49/54 model

== Users ==
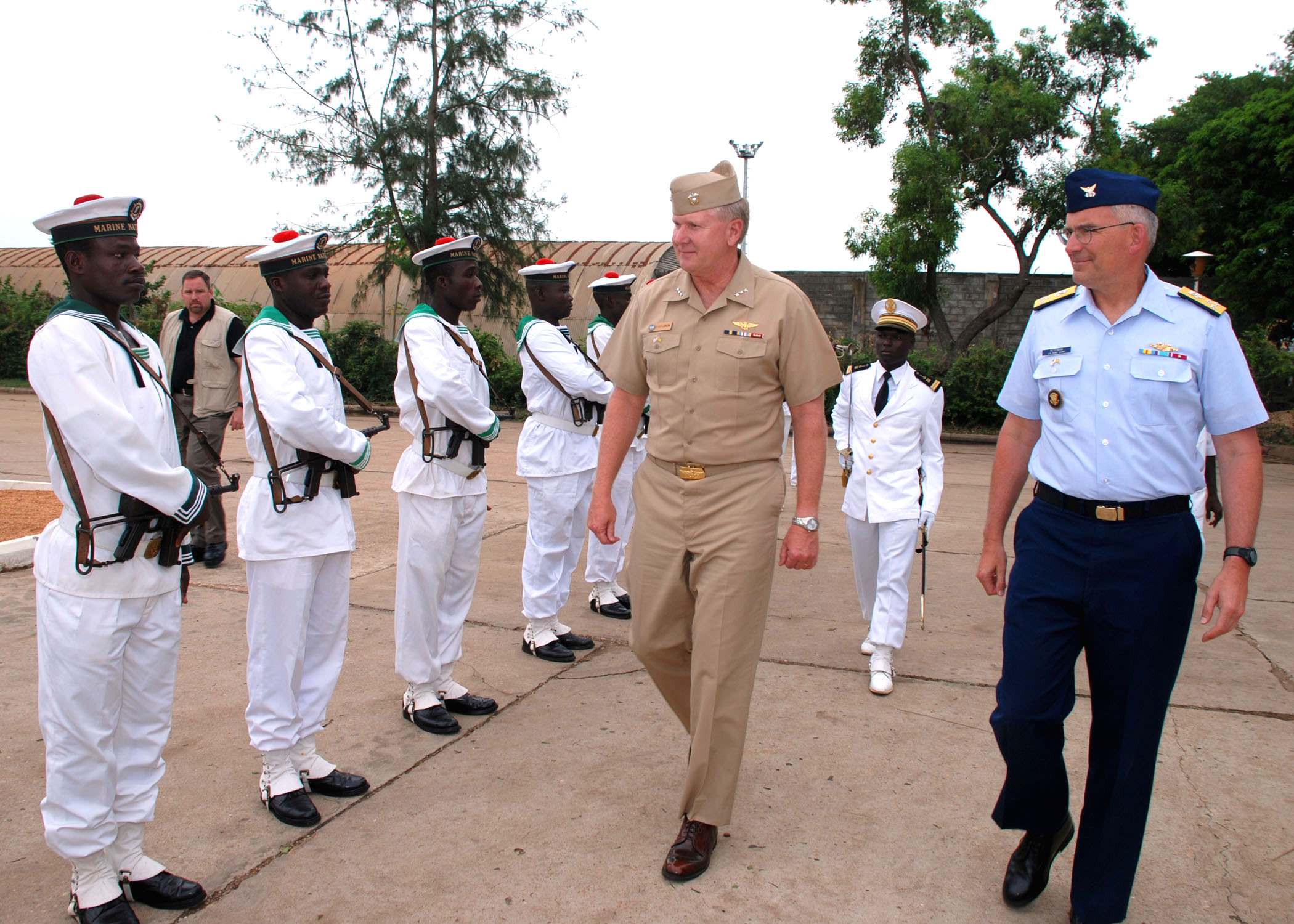
Togolese sailors equipped with MAT-49 in 2007.

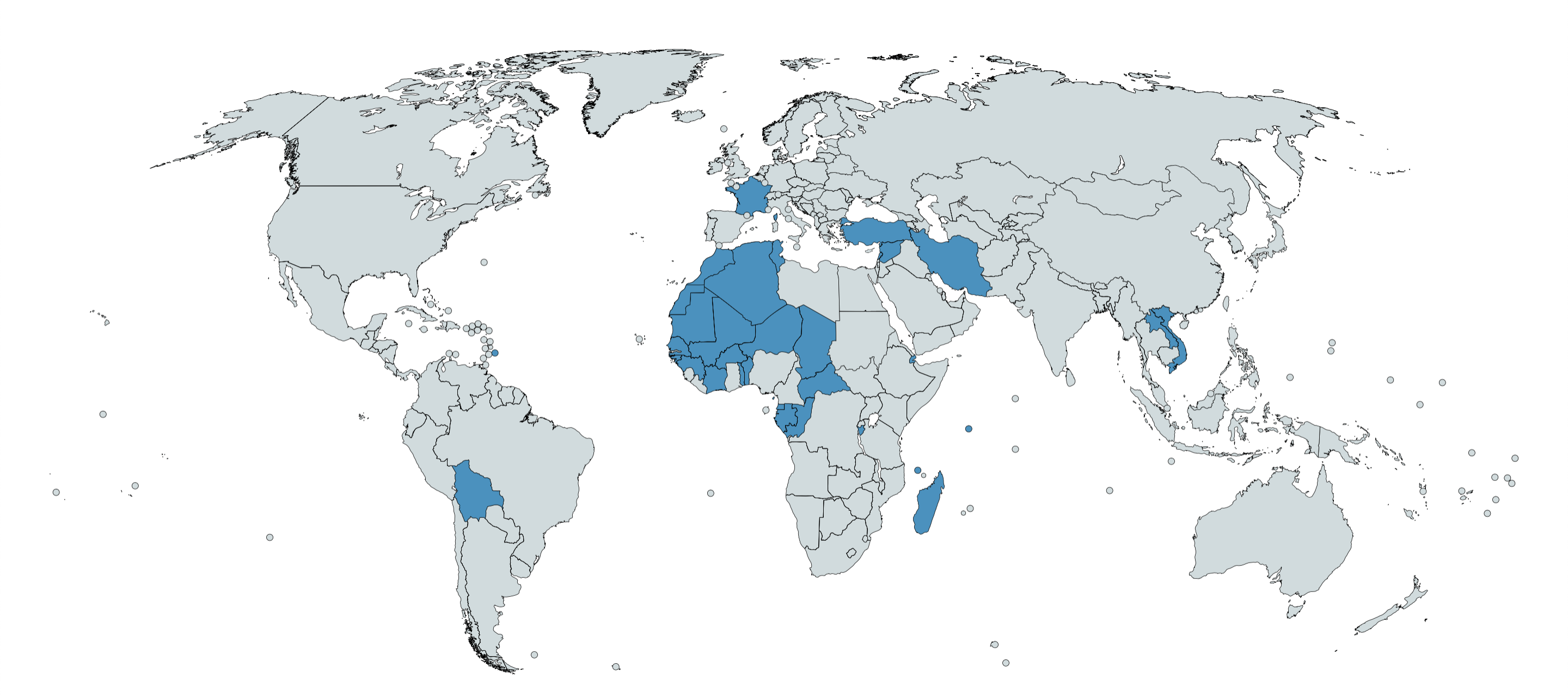
Map with MAT-49 users in blue

- Algeria: In use with customs and prison security forces and in limited service with police forces
- Barbados
- Benin
- Bolivia
- Burkina Faso
- Burundi
- Central African Republic
- Chad
- Comoros
- Republic of the Congo
- Cote d'Ivoire
- Djibouti
- Equatorial Guinea
- France: Adopted by the French army in 1949. Also used by the National Gendarmerie.
- Gabon
- Guinea
- Guinea Bissau
- Iran: Used in small numbers by the Shahrbani.
- Kingdom of Laos: Received from French government during First Indochina War.
- Laos
- Lebanon
- Madagascar
- Mali - Armed and Security Forces of Mali
- Mauritania
- Morocco
- Niger
- Senegal
- Seychelles
- Syria: used by police and special forces
- Turkey: Captured MAT-49s donated to Village guards.
- Togo
- Tunisia
- Vietnam: used 9mm and 7.62mm MAT-49s.

=== Non-state entities ===
- (Basque Country (autonomous community)) ETA: Produced unlicensed copies of existing weapons in an underground workshop at Mouguerre after it was raided by police.
- (Mozambique) FRELIMO
- National Liberation Army (Libya)
- Sahrawi Arab Democratic Republic
- Séléka
- Viet Cong
- Viet Minh: known as Tuyn, from the name of the manufacturer (Tulle).
- Zimbabwe African National Liberation Army

== See also ==
- Gevarm D4
- Halcón ML-63
- Hotchkiss Type Universal
- Sola submachine gun
- Vigneron submachine gun
- MAS-38 replaced in the 1950s by the MAT-49 submachine gun.
