= Sola submachine gun =

Sola Super
- Type: Submachine gun
- Place of origin: Luxembourg

Service history
- Used by: See Users

Production history
- Designed: 1952
- Manufacturer: Société Luxembourgeoise d'Armes S.A.
- Produced: 1954-1957
- Variants: Sola Super; Sola Leger

Specifications
- Mass: 2.86 kilograms (6.3 lb)
- Cartridge: 9×19mm Parabellum
- Caliber: 9mm
- Action: Blowback
- Rate of fire: 550 rpm
- Feed system: 32 round Vigneron submachine gun magazine
- Sights: Iron

The Sola is a submachine gun that was built by Société Luxembourgeoise d'Armes S.A. in Luxembourg between 1954 and 1957. It uses the 9×19mm Parabellum round and is capable of using Vigneron submachine gun magazines, which were popular around Europe at the time. This weapon saw service in Africa and several are still in use today.

== Overview ==
The SOLA Super submachine gun is a blowback-operated, open-bolt, selective-fire weapon.

The factory barrel comes with a built-in compensator.

The fire selector is located on the left-hand side of the grip, and has three settings: Safe, semi-auto, and fully automatic.

The ejection port comes with a dust cover that, when closed, locks the bolt in position.

The weapon is fed from a 32-round (standard) staggered magazine.

The rear iron sights are flip-up, while the front is fixed in the "blade" pattern; The sights are marked for 50 (handgun range) and 150 meters.

The gun comes standard with a retractable shoulder stock.

== Variants ==
2 variants of this submachine gun were built.

=== Sola Light ===
This submachine gun was one of the few products of the Luxembourg-based SOLA S.A., a company that briefly produced submachine guns for commercial export. Along with their "Super" model, SOLA produced a "Light" submachine gun which was intended to be compact, cheap, and lightweight. In terms of design it was essentially a Sten-pattern submachine gun with an extremely basic construction comprising very few parts. It operated on a straight-blowback action housed in a stamped steel tubular receiver, fitted with a pistol grip and a retracting wire stock. The magazine was shared with the Belgian made Vigneron submachine gun, and while visually similar to the MP 40, they were not interchangeable.

The SOLA "Light" model reportedly cost less than $20 (in 1957 money) and could be produced in large quantities at short notice. However the only sales achieved were illicit deals with an arms trafficker, who supplied a large quantity of SOLA "Super" and "Light" submachine guns to FLN rebels in Algeria (detailed in the SOLA Super page). In connection with this illegal activity, the SOLA plant was raided by police in 1957 and 1,500 unsold SOLA "Light" submachine guns were confiscated, most being destroyed. SOLA briefly moved to plastics manufacturing before closing down in the early 1960s.

== Users ==
- Luxembourg
- Algeria
- People's Republic of the Congo.
- Sudan

== See also ==
- MP 40
- M3 submachine gun
- FBP
- MAT-49
- Vigneron submachine gun
- Zastava M56
- List of submachine guns
