= Vigneron submachine gun =

Vigneron
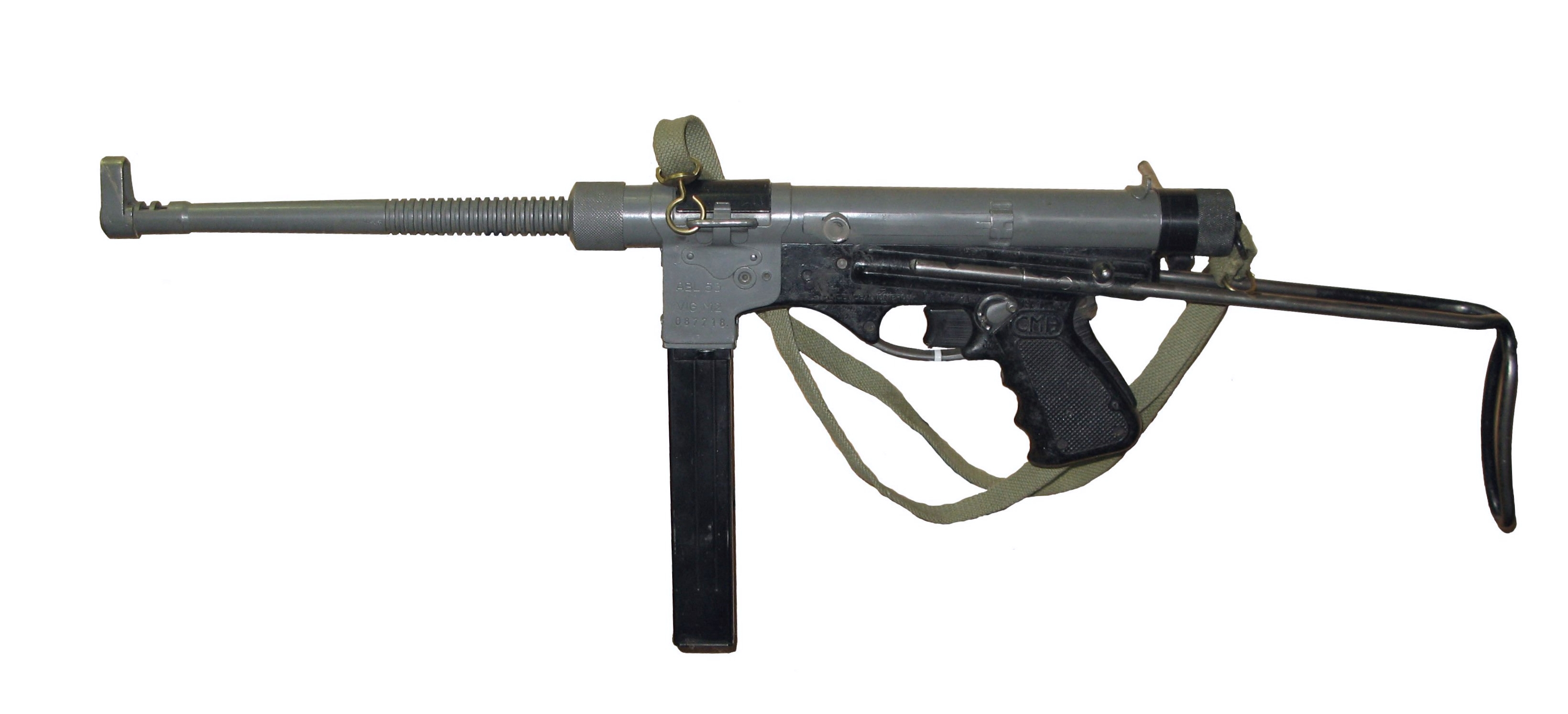
- Vigneron M2
- Type: Submachine gun
- Place of origin: Belgium

Service history
- In service: 1950s-1990s
- Used by: Belgium other users
- Wars: Congo Crisis; The Troubles; Portuguese Colonial War

Production history
- Designer: Georges Vigneron

Specifications
- Mass: 3 kg (empty); 3.68 kg (loaded)
- Cartridge: 9×19mm NATO
- Action: Blowback
- Rate of fire: 620 rpm
- Muzzle velocity: 381 m/s
- Effective firing range: 100 m
- Feed system: 32-round Dual column, single feed magazine
- Sights: Fixed

The Vigneron is a submachine gun manufactured in Belgium during the 1950s. It used the 9×19mm NATO cartridge and was used by the Belgian Army until the 1980s. The Vigneron is a selective-fire weapon for short-range street and brush fighting. It remains reasonably accurate up to 100 m using sighted semi-automatic fire.

== History ==
=== Pre-production ===
After World War II the Belgian Army was equipped with a mixture of British and American guns. The army wanted to replace these weapons with modern designs of preferable Belgian origin. In the late 1940s, the army held submachine gun trials between the following prototypes:

- the Vigneron
- the Imperia, an improved Sten gun
- the RAN, a design by Repousmetal S.A.
- several FN prototypes

=== M1 ===
The Vigneron M1 was designed by a retired Belgian army Colonel, Georges Vigneron, and officially adopted by the Belgian army in 1953. (this adoption date needs to be confirmed, one known survivor serial 002212 is stamped ABL 1952, indicating it was in Belgian army service a year before this date)

The first series of Vignerons was manufactured by the Societe Anonyme Precision Liegeoise in Herstal. Some parts were subcontracted to the State Arsenal at Rocourt in Liège, who eventually began making complete guns. Other Vignerons were fabricated by the company Ateliers de Fabrications Electriques et Metalliques or AFEM in Brussels. An unconfirmed story says that the CMH inscription on the grip means Compagnie de Manufacture Herstal, and this company is supposed to have made the plastic lower receiver.

The first model Vigneron was made until serial number 21300 in 1954. (This date needs to be confirmed since known M2 survivors have serial numbers indicating that at least 90,530 M2's had been built by 1953). Some sources state that many M1's were reworked to M2 standard by fitting hood over foresight, changing the rear sight and fitting a stronger spring to the ejection port cover and that when this upgrade was done the M1 designation was overstamped M2, but examples of M1's that have been upgraded to the M2 exist where the original M1 stamp has not been over stamped.

=== M2 ===
The M2 version was an improvement in several ways, it was in production by 1953: (One known Vigneron M2 is stamped as serial 086916 and is dated 1953)

- a front sight protector was installed
- a rear sight notch was used instead of a peep sight
- the dust cover closing spring was made stronger

== Design and influence ==
The Vigneron is a simple blowback design and was made out of stamped sheet metal and a plastic grip frame. It uses the standard 9×19mm NATO round out of a 32-shot double-column, single-feed, box magazine. Army doctrine recommends to shortload the magazine to 28 rounds to prevent failures. A box type loading tool is used to assist loading the magazine.

The gun was designed with a long barrel (305mm) which featured a compensator and cooling fins. The replaceable barrel was held in by a knurled nut, but a design fault meant that the barrel could be fitted upside down. This fault was never corrected. Empty cases are ejected out of the ejection port on the right which has a hinged dust cover. This cover opens automatically when cocking the gun. If the gun is to be kept cocked in dusty conditions the cover can be manually closed after cocking to exclude dust and grit, and it will open automatically when the gun is fired.

The bolt handle is on the left side and is non-reciprocating. A cover plate excludes dust and grit when the lever is returned forward.

The stock is heavy steel rod and it telescopes along the receiver; one end is slotted for swabs and the other is threaded for a cleaning brush.

The sights are fixed and set for a range of 50 m. The M2 has a simple notch rear sight and a hood cover that protects the front sight.

The pistol grip contains a grip safety which must be held before the weapon can be cocked or fired.

There are three selector positions: safe, single round and full automatic fire. When set to full-auto; it is still possible to squeeze off single rounds with good trigger control.

Influence by some popular WW-II-era designs is apparent. The "Cutts" type barrel compensator and cooling rings are reminiscent of the Thompson submachine gun, the wire stock looks like the M3 submachine gun, the bolt design is nearly identical to the Sten and the magazine is almost the same as the one designed for the MP40. However MP40 magazines will not interchange with Vigneron magazines. Neither will fit the other weapon.

A blank firing barrel and a grenade launcher attachment were also made for this gun.

== Users ==
- Algeria
- Belgium
- Burundi
- Congo-Kinshasa
- Katanga
- Luxembourg
- Portugal (where designated Pistola Metralhadora m/961)
- Rwanda
- (Republic of Ireland) IRA

== See also ==
- List of submachine guns
- MP 40
- M3 submachine gun
- MAT-49
- Pleter 91 submachine gun
- Sola submachine gun
- M56 submachine gun
- Uzi
- MAC 10
