= Lebret, Saskatchewan =

Village in Saskatchewan, Canada

Lebret
- Village
- Village of Lebret
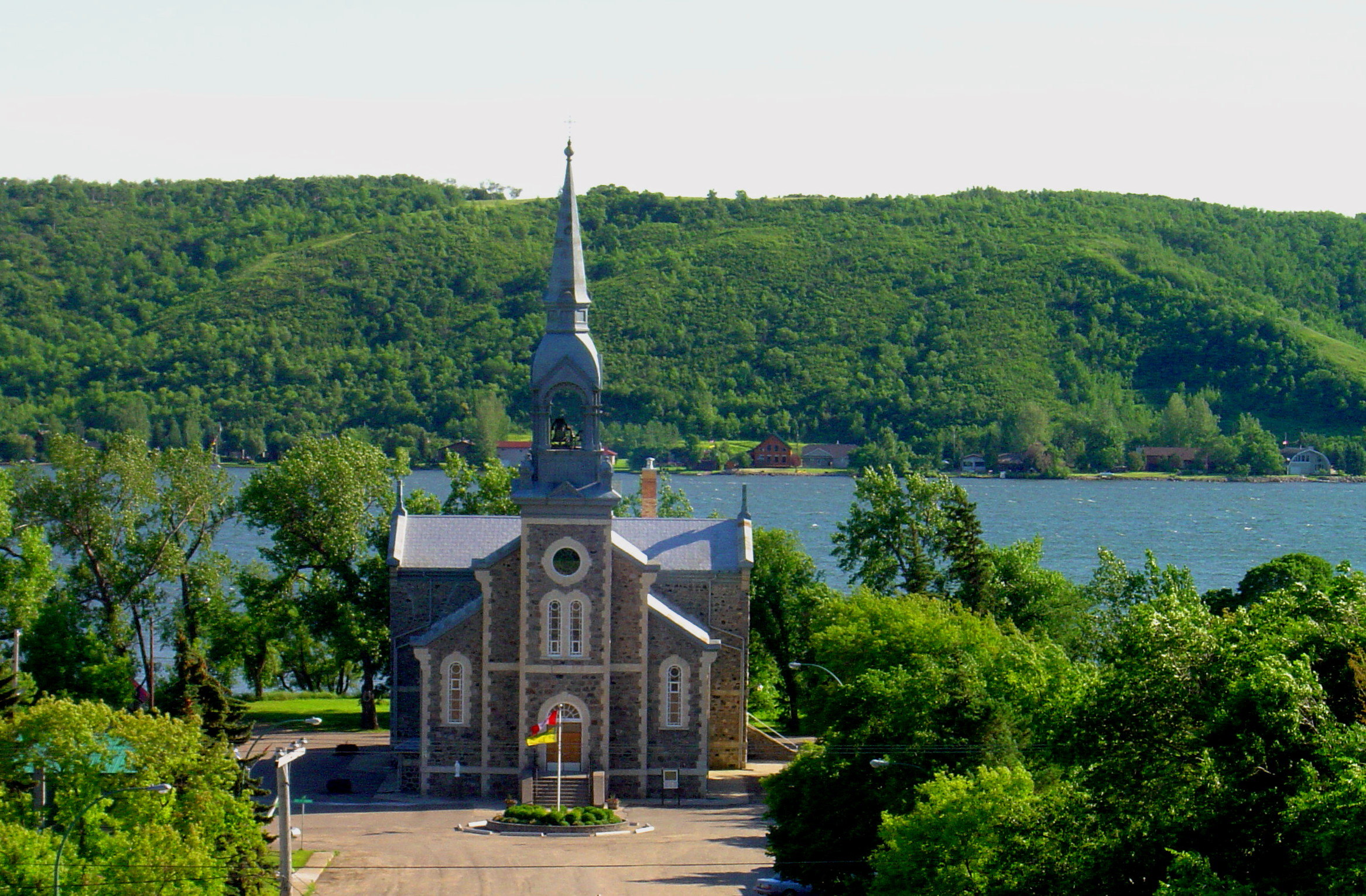
- Sacred Heart Roman Catholic Church

- Location of Lebret in Saskatchewan Lebret (Canada)
- Coordinates: 50°45′25.66″N 103°42′10.20″W
- Country: Canada
- Province: Saskatchewan
- Region: South-central
- Census division: 6
- Rural municipality: North Qu'Appelle No. 187
- Post office founded: 1880
- Incorporated (Village): 1912

Government
  - Type: Municipal
  - Governing body: Lebret Village Council
  - Mayor: Ralph Blondeau
  - Administrator: Caroline MacMurchy

Area
  - Total: 1.31 km^{2} (0.51 sq mi)

Population (2016)
  - Total: 216
  - Density: 165.3/km^{2} (428/sq mi)
- Time zone: UTC-6 (CST)
- Postal code: S0G 2Y0
- Area code: 306
- Highways: Highway 56
- Waterways: Katepwa Lake; Mission Lake

Lebret (2016 population: 216) is a village in the Canadian province of Saskatchewan within the Rural Municipality of North Qu'Appelle No. 187 and Census Division No. 6. The village is situated on Mission Lake of the Fishing Lakes in the Qu'Appelle Valley. Lebret is located along Highway 56, about 70 kilometres (43 mi) northeast of the city of Regina. The village was named after "the parish priest, Father Louis Lebret, who became the first postmaster of the community and, although he only held the position for a little more than six months, the office was named Lebret and the name became that of the community".

== History ==
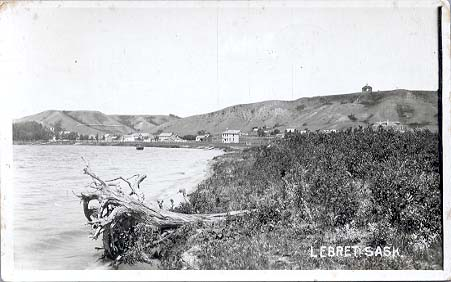
Lebret in 1921 from just northeast on the same side of the lake

The site of Lebret first came to non-First Nations attention in 1814 when Abbé Provencher visited. A further such visit occurred when Abbé Picard from Pembina arrived in 1841 and wintered with John McDonald, previously of the North-West Company. The next record of visit is of Bishop Taché passing through in 1864 en route to Ile á la Crosse, returning with a party and staying in Fort Qu’Appelle. He chose the site which later became the village of Lebret for the Catholic mission, established the next year in 1866 (one of the earliest) in what became the province of Saskatchewan in 1905.

It "became the main centre of Catholicism for the Métis and First Nations people in the region and a base for Oblate priests who travelled the southern plains to points such as Wood Mountain and the Cypress Hills." The federal government financed the Qu'Appelle Indian Residential School in Lebret. which started in 1884 and run by the Missionary Oblates of Mary Immaculate. The first post office was opened in 1886, named Lebret which was given to the community. The Sisters of Our Lady of the Missions arrived in 1899 and founded Saint Gabriel's Convent in 1906.

Lebret incorporated as a village on October 14, 1912. The fieldstone Sacred Heart Church built in 1925. Churchgoing vastly waned among the Baby-Boom Generation to all but fundamentalist denominations beginning in the mid-1960s but full-house concerts were held in Sacred Heart Church by choirs of the nearby Saskatchewan Summer School of the Arts in Fort San. This ceased when the Summer School closed in 1991 due to lack of funding.

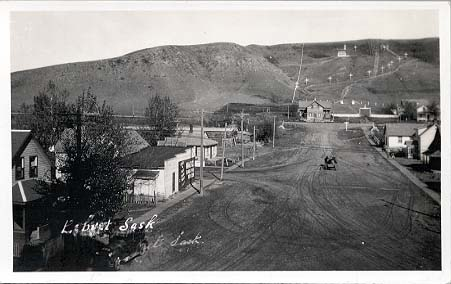
The stations of the cross on the hill were erected in 1929.

In 1929 the landmark stations of the cross and the small chapel shrine on the hill overlooking Lebret were erected. Until the latter half of the 20th century Lebret was an important religious and educational centre. In addition to the residential school and the convent, there was a public school, and the Oblates established a theological training centre, Sacred Heart Scholasticate, on the south side of Mission Lake.

The scholasticate closed in the 1960s, the convent in the 1970s and the public school in 1980, its pupils transferring to Fort Qu’Appelle. The residential school was signed over to a First Nations school board in October 1973, at a ceremony presided over by the then Minister of Indian Affairs, Jean Chrétien. The school, which eventually became known as White Calf Collegiate, closed in 1998.

It is still stated, though with its continuing relevance not dwelled upon, that "French Canadians continued to supplement the Métis in the Qu’Appelle Valley" and that "[t]he mission at Lebret was established in 1866".

Lebret is well known for the "Garbage House" Made famous by Adam Opdahl"

== Demographics ==
Population history (1981–2016)
Year	Pop.	±%
1981	274	—
1986	201	−26.6%
1991	201	+0.0%
1996	226	+12.4%
2001	207	−8.4%
2006	203	−1.9%
2011	218	+7.4%
2016	216	−0.9%
Source: Statistics Canada via Saskatchewan Bureau of Statistics

In the 2021 Census of Population conducted by Statistics Canada, Lebret had a population of 226 living in 102 of its 146 total private dwellings, a change of 2.3% from its 2016 population of 221. With a land area of 1.24 km^{2} (0.48 sq mi), it had a population density of 182.3/km^{2} (472.0/sq mi) in 2021.

In the 2016 Census of Population, the Village of Lebret recorded a population of 216 living in 96 of its 142 total private dwellings, a 7.9% change from its 2011 population of 199. With a land area of 1.31 km^{2} (0.51 sq mi), it had a population density of 164.9/km^{2} (427.1/sq mi) in 2016.

== Economy ==
At various times during the village's history, there were numerous businesses including a gas station, diner, grain elevator, pawn shop, ice cream store, and hardware store.

== Image gallery ==
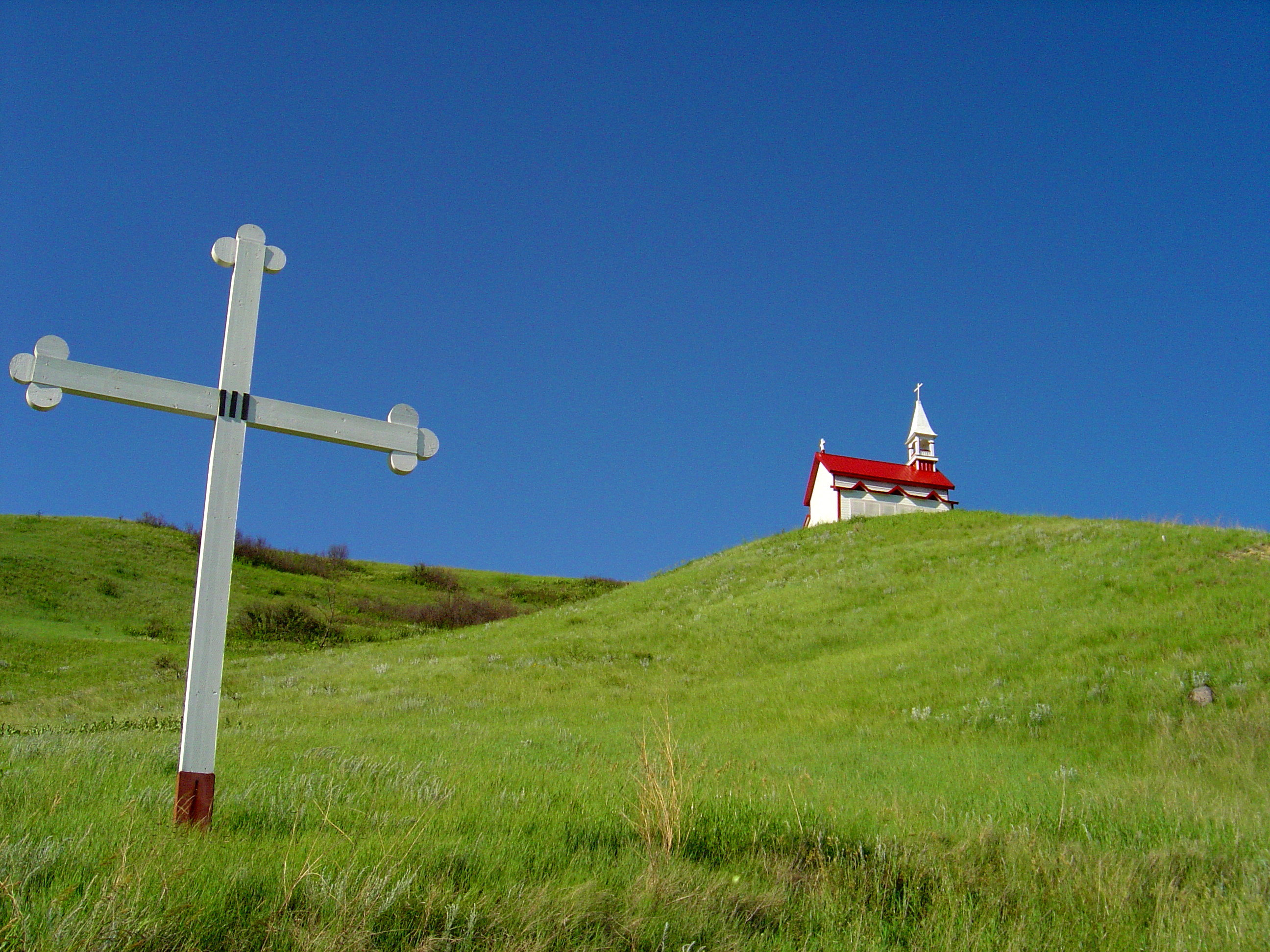
The stations of the cross north of the village, across the highway

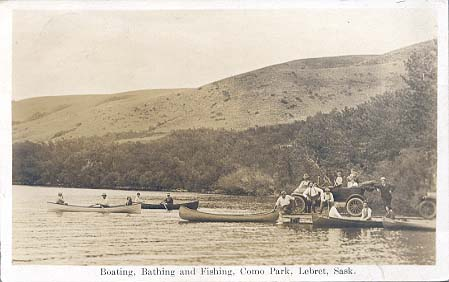
Como Park, now part of the resort village of Sandy Beach on Katepwa Lake, about five miles southeast of Lebret

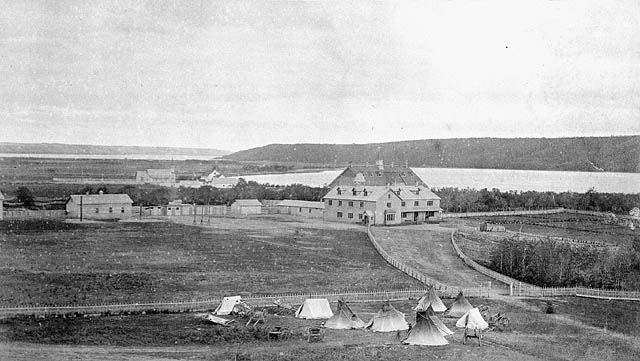
Qu'Appelle Industrial School in 1885. Parents camped outside the gate in order to visit their children. Destroyed by fire in 1904.

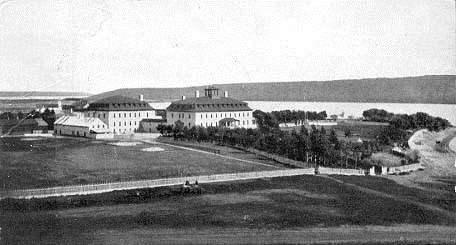
This Qu'Appelle Industrial School built in 1905 replaced the one destroyed by fire the previous year. It, too, burned in 1932.

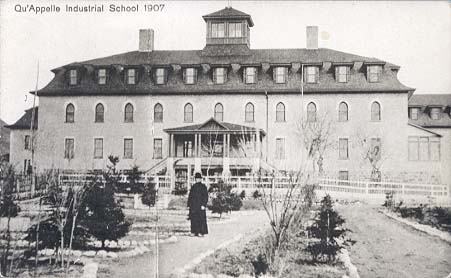
Qu'Appelle Industrial School was built in 1905 to replace one destroyed by fire the previous year. It, too, burned in 1932.

== See also ==
- Lebret Eagles, defunct junior hockey team based in Lebret
- List of communities in Saskatchewan
- List of villages in Saskatchewan
