= Dave Dryburgh =

Canadian sports journalist (1908–1948)

- Born: November 20, 1908; Kirkcaldy, Scotland, UK
- Died: July 11, 1948 (aged 39); Echo Lake, Saskatchewan, Canada
- Occupation: Sports journalist
- Employer: The Leader-Post
- Awards: Canadian Football Hall of Fame
- Honours: Dave Dryburgh Memorial Trophy

Dave Dryburgh (November 20, 1908 – July 11, 1948) was a Scotland-born Canadian sports journalist. A native of Kirkcaldy and an immigrant to Regina, he reported on the soccer games in which he played for The Leader-Post. As the newspaper's sports editor from 1932 to 1948, he primarily covered Canadian football and the Regina Roughriders, and ice hockey in Western Canada. His columns "Sport Byways" and "Dryburgh" give a first-hand account of sporting events, and were read widely in Western Canada. As the secretary of the Saskatchewan Amateur Hockey Association during the 1930s and 1940s, he established its registration system including the history of each player. He also served as the official statistician for baseball, softball and hockey leagues in Saskatchewan.

After Dryburgh drowned in a boating accident at age 39, sportswriters in Western Canada established the Dave Dryburgh Memorial Trophy for the top scorer in the Western Interprovincial Football Union. Other trophies named for him include the Dryburgh Memorial Trophy in the Western Canada Senior Hockey League, and the Dryburgh Memorial Trophy in the Southern Saskatchewan Baseball League. He was posthumously inducted to the Football Reporters of Canada section at the Canadian Football Hall of Fame in 1981.

== Early life ==
David Dryburgh was born on November 20, 1908, in Kirkcaldy, Scotland. He was one of seven brothers to parents George and Jane Dryburgh. He arrived in Regina, Saskatchewan, with his family on July 1, 1912, one day after the Regina Cyclone, then went back to Scotland during World War I. The family returned to Regina following the war, where Dryburgh completed his education and played soccer as a youth and adult. He was introduced to journalism part-time while reporting on the soccer games in which he played, since The Leader-Post had nobody assigned to cover the sport. He played right midfielder on the Regina City soccer team that played against a touring English team. Dryburgh had a brief apprenticeship as furniture maker with his father in the mid-1920s, which ended after recovering from pneumonia and changing jobs on advice of his doctor.

== Journalism career ==
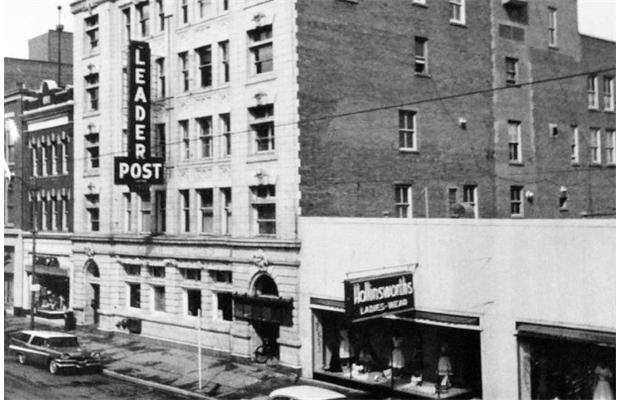
The Leader-Post building

Dryburgh became a full-time journalist and sports writer with The Leader-Post in 1928, then became its sports editor in 1932. Other positions he held with the newspaper included wire editor, city editor, and local politics correspondent. He primarily covered Canadian football and ice hockey. He frequented the press boxes at the Queen City Gardens, and at Taylor Field for the Regina Roughriders. He also often reported on curling, golf, baseball and softball, and travelled Canada extensively to give readers a first-hand account of sporting events.

The Leader-Post referred to Dryburgh as the "chairman" at the coffee rows in the Balmoral Cafe and Ritz Cafe in Regina, where he was frequently involved in sports conversations. His columns "Sport Byways" and "Dryburgh" were regularly printed in The Leader-Post and read widely in Western Canada. In addition to writing, he began hosting a daily sports talk series on CKCK-AM in February 1940.

Regina Roughriders' coach Al Ritchie felt that Dryburgh had "a style all his own", that was he clear and graphic, and that he was fair and honest with athletes and did not sidestep issues. Saskatchewan's Canadian Olympic Committee member Jack Hamilton said that Dryburgh was, "outspoken and fearless and yet most fair". Notre Dame Hounds founder Athol Murray stated that, Dryburgh "lived the game he wrote", and that, "many a time his reader could catch the very atmosphere and feel of the fight".

"Dave Dryburgh was one of the best young newspaper men in Canada. The neat sports page which he produced in his paper was worthy of a city 10 times the size of Regina. In his own column, there were times when he assumed the role of a professional "sour-puss" but this journalistic pose was strongly at variance with his natural disposition. He knew his audience and, deliberately, he would provoke inter-city controversies between his own bailiwick and the adjacent Manitoba capital of Winnipeg but, in such cases, he wrote with his tongue tucked firmly in his cheek."

— Jim Coleman, The Globe and Mail

In addition to reporting on hockey, Dryburgh was a long-time secretary of the Saskatchewan Amateur Hockey Association during the 1930s and 1940s. He established the association's registration system which included the history of each player. In 1943, he was named a trustee of the Edmonton Journal Trophy, awarded by the Canadian Amateur Hockey Association to the intermediate-level champion of Western Canada. He also served as the official statistician for several leagues including, the Southern Saskatchewan Baseball League, the Intercity Softball League, and the Saskatchewan Senior Hockey League.

== Personal life and death ==
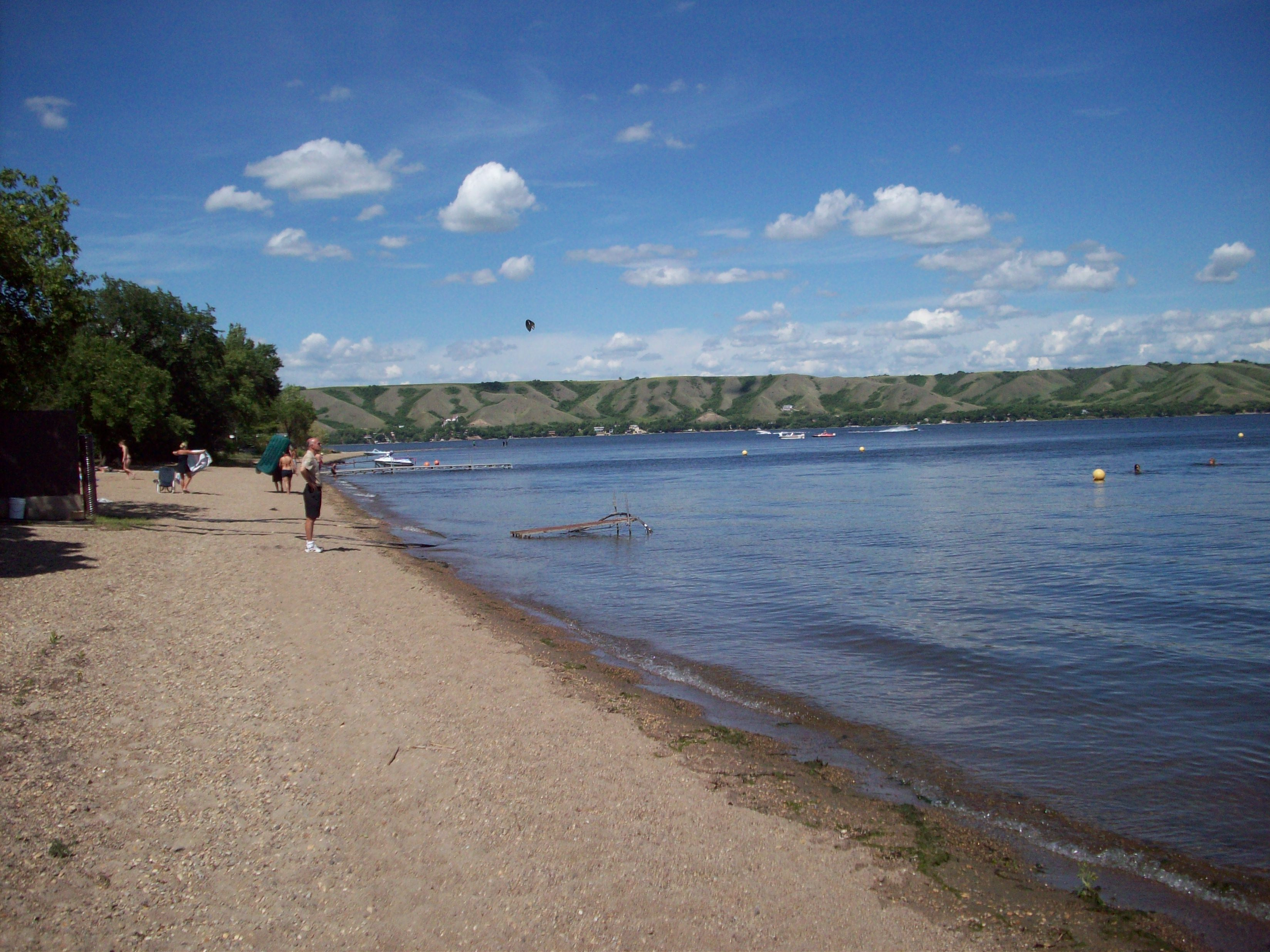
Beach at B-Say-Tah Point in Echo Lake

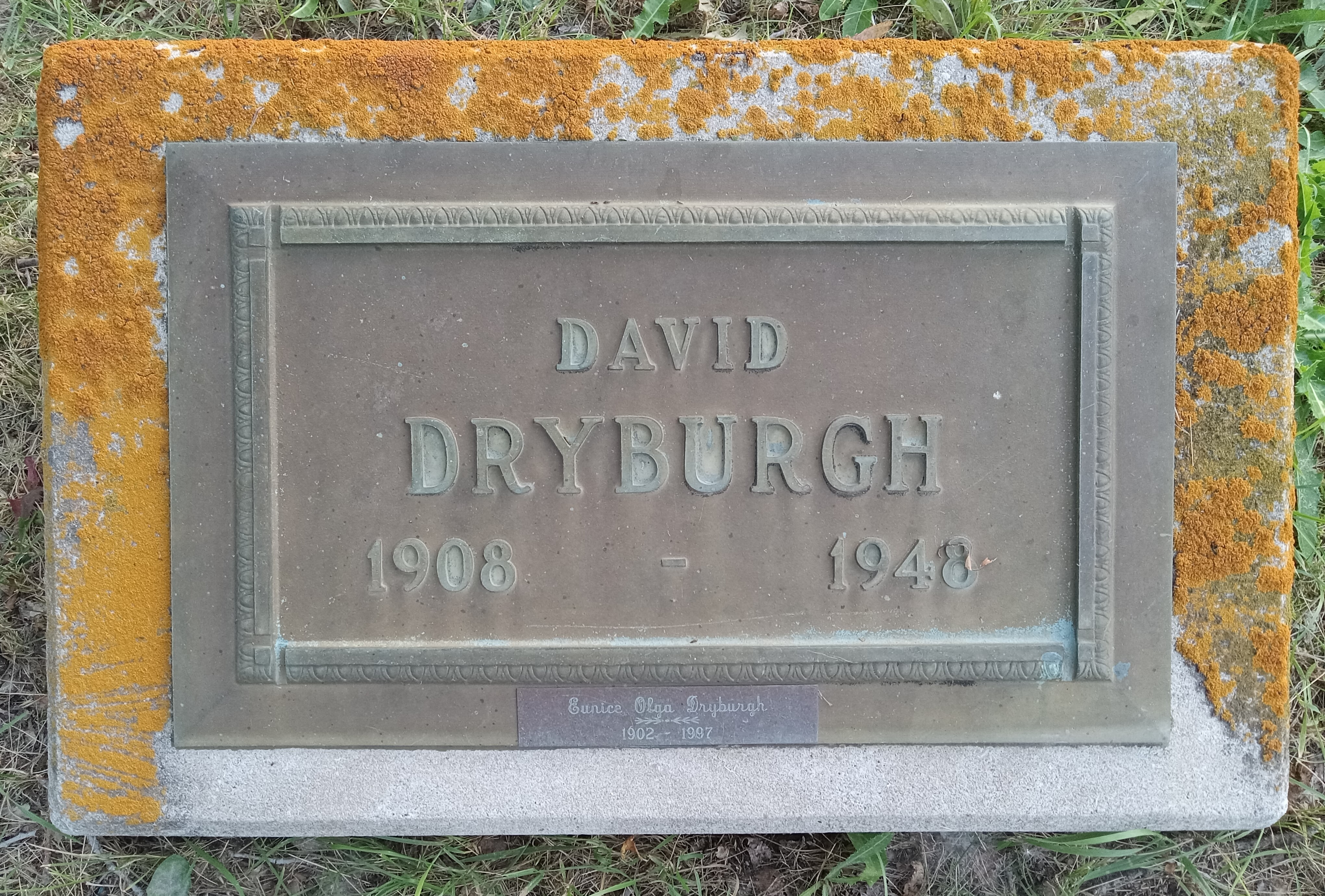
Dryburgh's grave marker

Dryburgh coached The Leader-Post's ice hockey team in the local commercial league during the 1929–30 season. He was also a member of the Regina Curling Club, and a director at the Wascana Country Club.

On August 17, 1931, Dryburgh was married to Eunice Turner, then honeymooned at Prince Albert National Park. Dryburgh and his wife never had children. His mother died in September 1932, after an operation at age 44.

While on vacation with his wife, Dryburgh drowned on July 11, 1948, in a boating accident near B-Say-Tah Point on Echo Lake. He was operating the motor when the boat capsized, and he could not swim. His funeral three days later was attended by hundreds of mourners from across Western Canada, including fellow sports editors, newspapermen and sportspersons. He was interred in Regina Cemetery.

== Legacy and honours ==
After Dryburgh's death, Calgary Herald sports editor Bob Mamini stated, "for 18 years Dave Dryburgh carried out assignments with the speed, understanding and fearlessness that made him a sports authority that will be hard to replace", and that "you didn't always agree with what he had to say but you had to admire the way he said it". Edmonton Journal sports editor George Mackintosh wrote that, "Dryburgh was held in high esteem particularly by the newspaper fraternity", and that he was "one of the keenest observers of the sportive scene in the dominion". Manitoba Amateur Hockey Association secretary and Winnipeg Free Press sports editor Ed Armstrong felt that, Dryburgh made Eastern Canada "east-west conscious in three of our major sports—rugby football, hockey and curling".

Sports columnist Tom Moore wrote in The Albertan that Dryburgh was;

"Recognized by the boys who wrote with him–and against him–as the best-informed football writer on the prairies. Dryburgh was often outspoken in his criticism but could still count as friends most of the other writers and sportsmen with whom he had crossed verbal swords. He worked far beyond the demands of his job in supporting athletic development in Regina and in doing so helped in no small way to build up sport in the entire west."

The Western Canada Senior Hockey League established the Dryburgh Memorial Trophy in July 1948, awarded to the top goaltender during the regular season. The Southern Saskatchewan Baseball League established the Dryburgh Memorial Trophy in October 1948, awarded to the top pitcher during the regular season. In November 1948, the Dave Dryburgh Memorial Trophy was established by sportswriters in Western Canada, given to the top scorer in the Western Interprovincial Football Union.

Dryburgh was posthumously inducted to the Football Reporters of Canada section at the Canadian Football Hall of Fame in 1981.
