= Saskatchewan Highway 210 =

Provincial highway in Saskatchewan, Canada

Highway 210

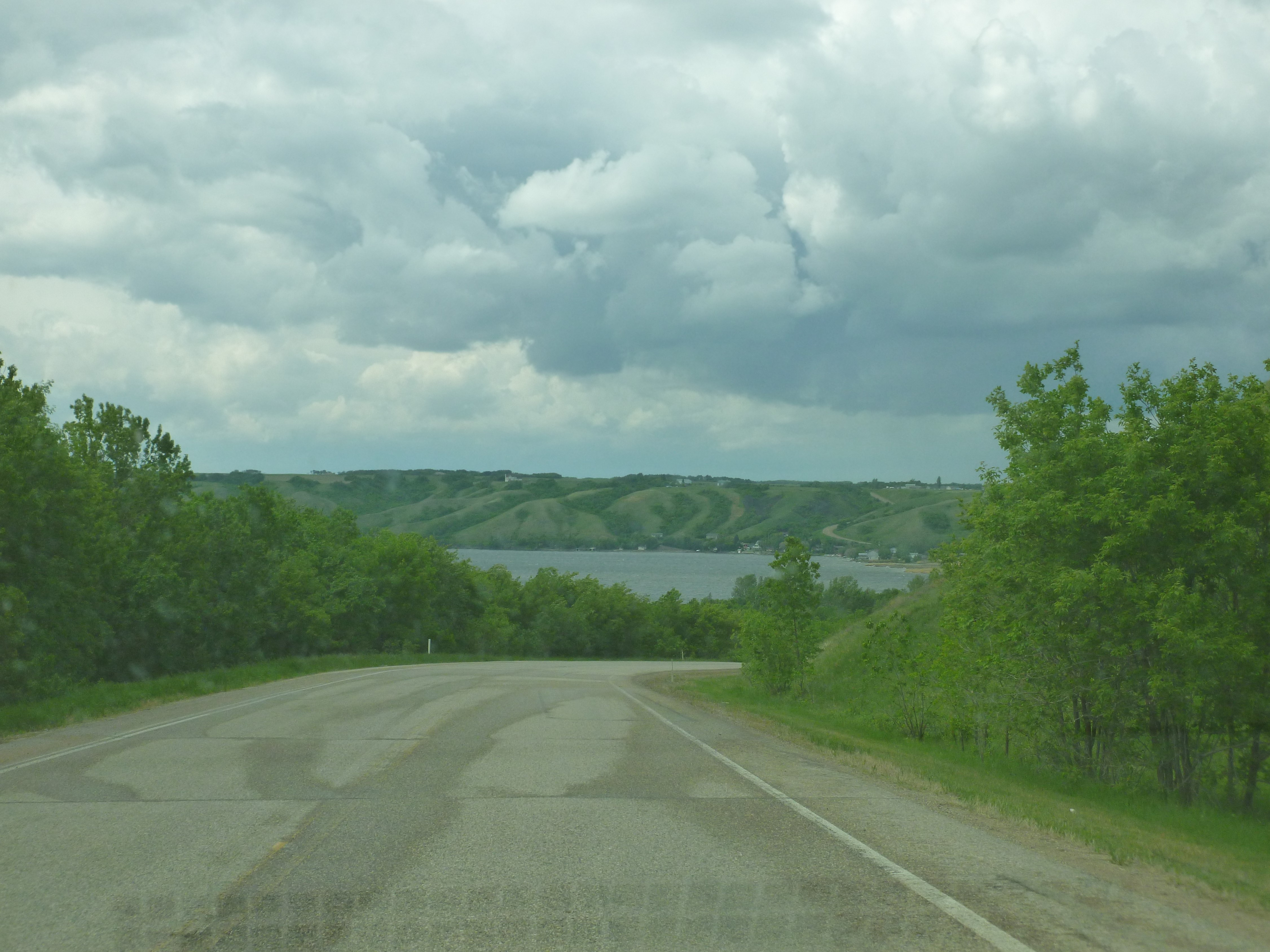
- Highway 210 in Echo Valley Provincial Park

Route information
- Maintained by Ministry of Highways and Infrastructure
- Length: 20.9 km (13.0 mi)

Major junctions
- South end: Highway 10 near Fort Qu'Appelle
- Highway 56 in Echo Valley Provincial Park
- East end: Highway 35 in Fort Qu'Appelle

Location
- Country: Canada
- Province: Saskatchewan
- Rural municipalities: North Qu'Appelle

Highway system
- Provincial highways in Saskatchewan
← Highway 209	→ Highway 211

Highway 210 is a provincial highway in the Canadian province of Saskatchewan. Saskatchewan's 200-series highways primarily service its recreational areas. It runs from Highway 10 to Highway 35 in Fort Qu'Appelle. The highway intersects Highway 56 (where it switches cardinal directions from north–south to east–west) and passes through Echo Valley Provincial Park, B-Say-Tah, and provides access to Pasqua and Echo Lakes of the Fishing Lakes. It is about 21 kilometres (13 mi) long.

== Route description ==
Hwy 210 begins at an intersection with Hwy 10 halfway between Edgeley and Fort Qu'Appelle, with the road continuing south as Range Road 2144. It heads due north through rural farmland for several kilometres, travelling just to the east of Muscow and the Pasqua 79 First Nation Reserve (access via Township Road 210) to cross a railway and have an intersection with Mackay Hill Road and enter Echo Valley Provincial Park, winding its way down into the Qu'Appelle River Valley and passing by several park amenities and the visitor centre to come to an intersection with Hwy 56 at the southern end of the narrow isthmus (just below Sioux Crossing), with Pasqua Lake just to the immediate northwest. With Hwy 210 now switching cardinal directions and heading east, the highway winds its way along the coastline of Echo Lake past several lakeside cottages to leave the park and travel through the resort village of B-Say-Tah along B-Say-Tah Road, where it meets the eastern end of Mackay Hill Road. It now enters the town of Fort Qu'Appelle, running along Broadway Street straight through downtown, where it has an intersection with Boundary Avenue (leads to Hwy 56), before coming to an end at the junction with Hwy 35, just 190 metres (620 ft) to the north of that highway's junction with Hwy 10. The entire length of Hwy 210 is a paved, two-lane highway, located entirely within the Rural Municipality of North Qu'Appelle No. 187.

== Major intersections ==
From south to north:

Rural municipality	Location	km	mi	Destinations	Notes
North Qu'Appelle No. 187		0.0	0.0	Highway 10 – Regina, Fort Qu'Appelle	Southern terminus; road continues south as Range Road 2144
North Qu'Appelle No. 187		6.4	4.0	Township Road 210 – Muscow, Pasqua 79	
North Qu'Appelle No. 187	Echo Valley Provincial Park	12.1	7.5	Highway 56 south – Fort San, Pasqua Lake	Northern terminus of Hwy 56; Hwy 210 switches cardinal directions from north-south to east-west
North Qu'Appelle No. 187	Fort Qu'Appelle	20.9	13.0	Highway 35 – Wadena, Qu'Appelle	Eastern terminus
North Qu'Appelle No. 187	Fort Qu'Appelle	20.9	13.0	To Highway 10 – Yorkton, Regina	190 m (620 ft) to the south
North Qu'Appelle No. 187	Fort Qu'Appelle	20.9	13.0	To Highway 56 – Fort San, Indian Head	700 m (0.4 mi) to the north
1.000 mi = 1.609 km; 1.000 km = 0.621 mi

== Photo gallery ==
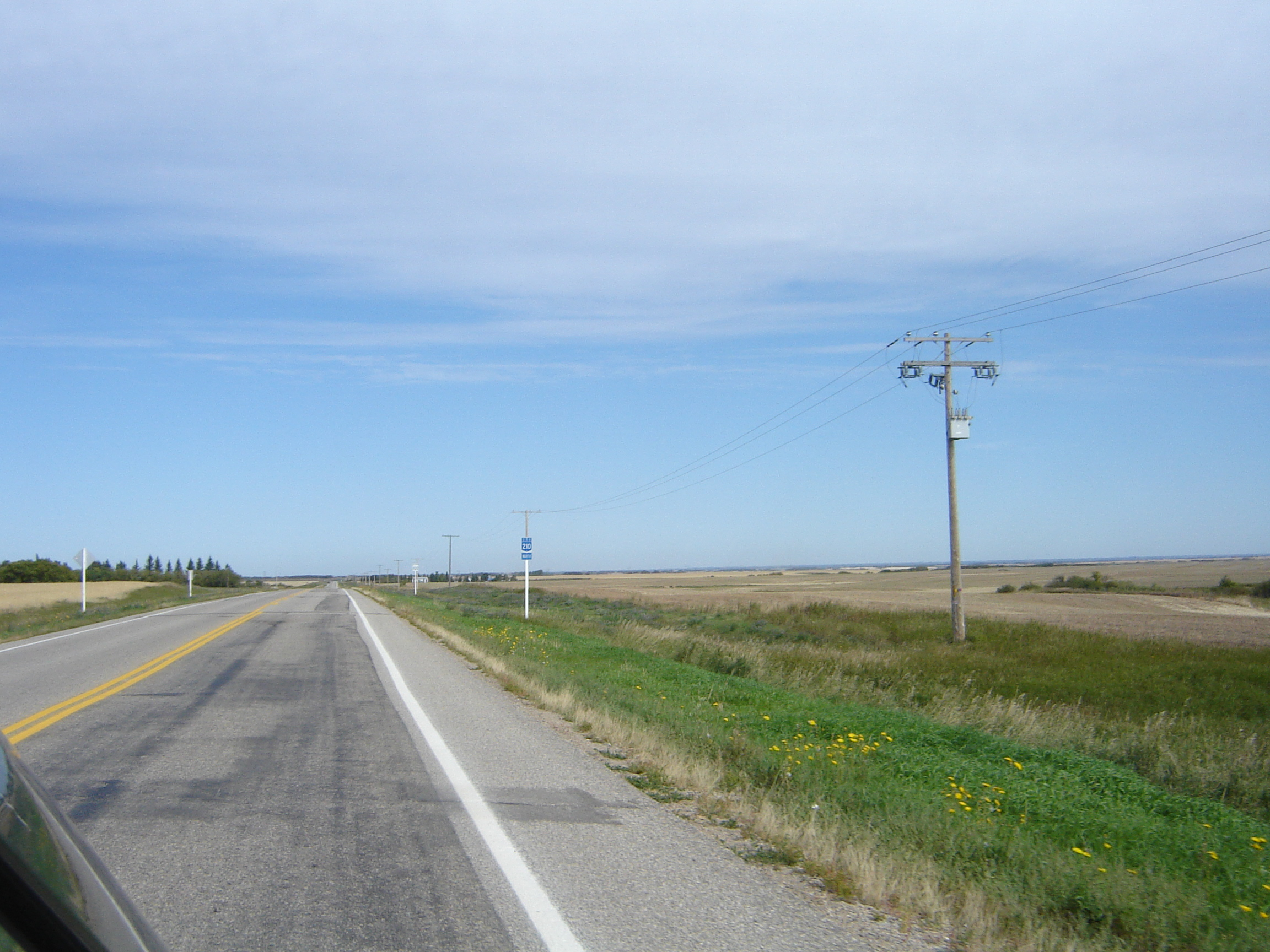
Highway 210 north to Fort San from Regina

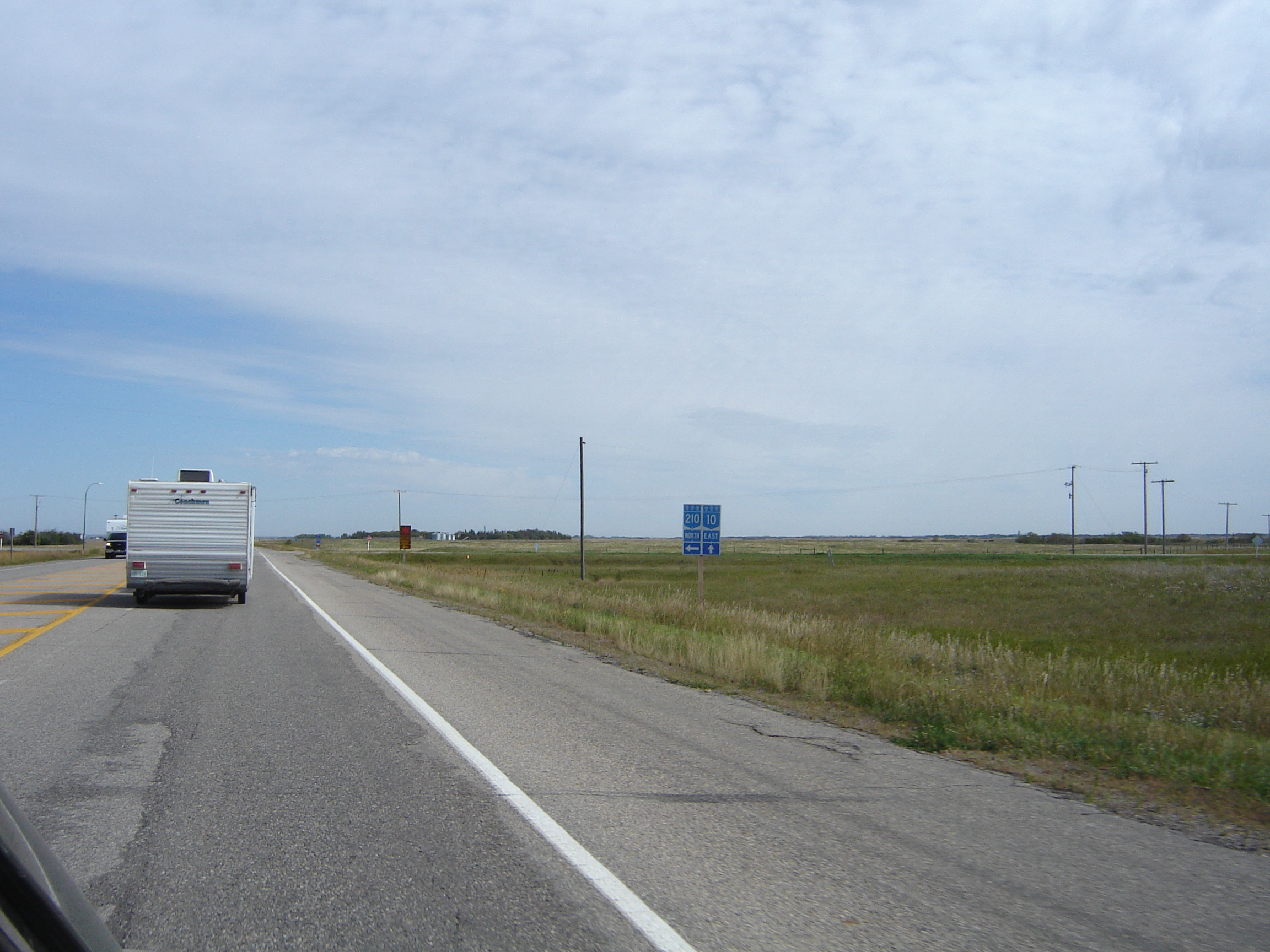
Hwy 10 / Highway 210 junction (looking north-east)

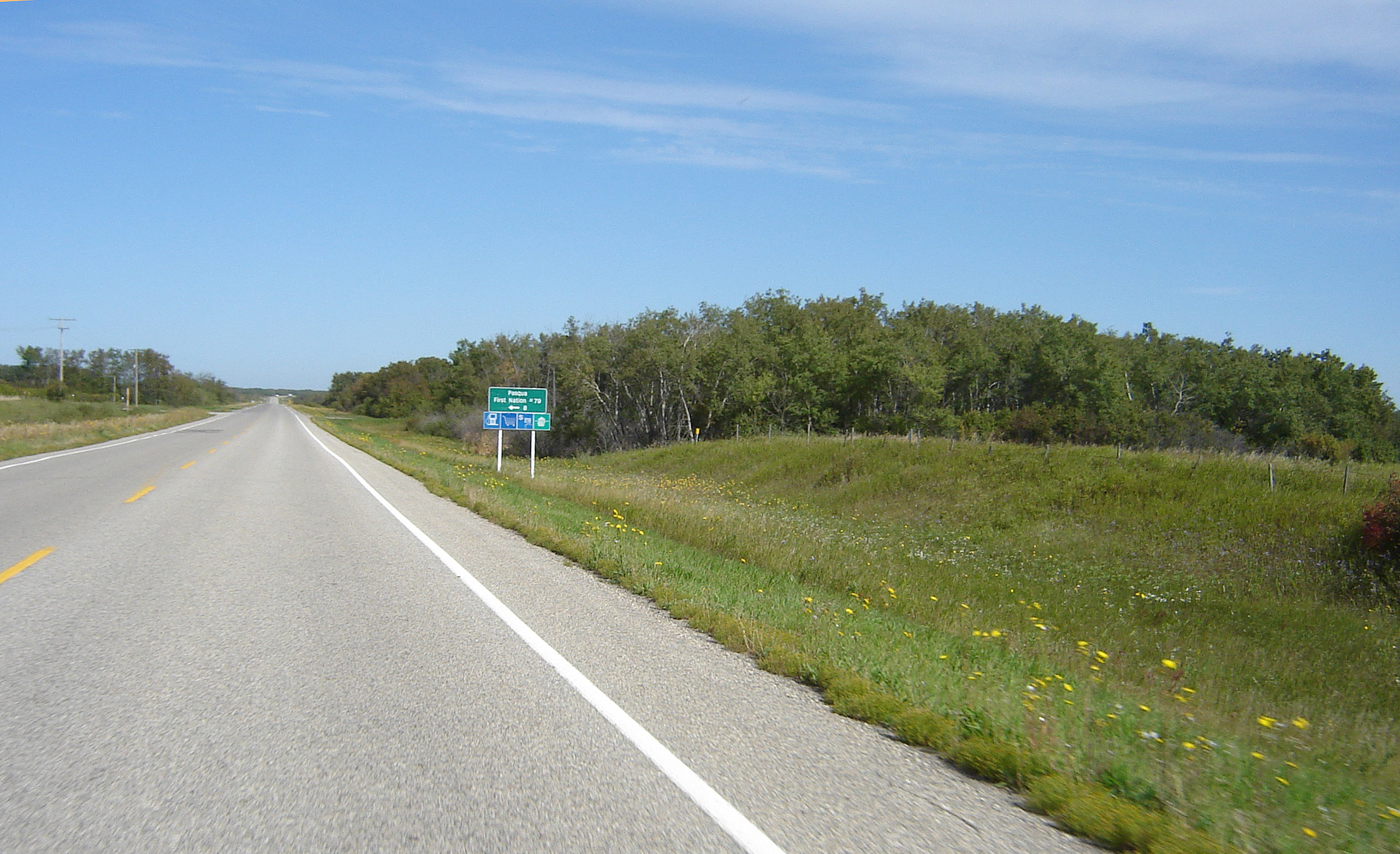
Pasqua First Nation #79 along Highway 210

== See also ==
- Transportation in Saskatchewan
- Roads in Saskatchewan
