= Fishing Lakes =

Chain of lakes in Saskatchewan, Canada

- Calling Lakes, Qu'Appelle Lakes
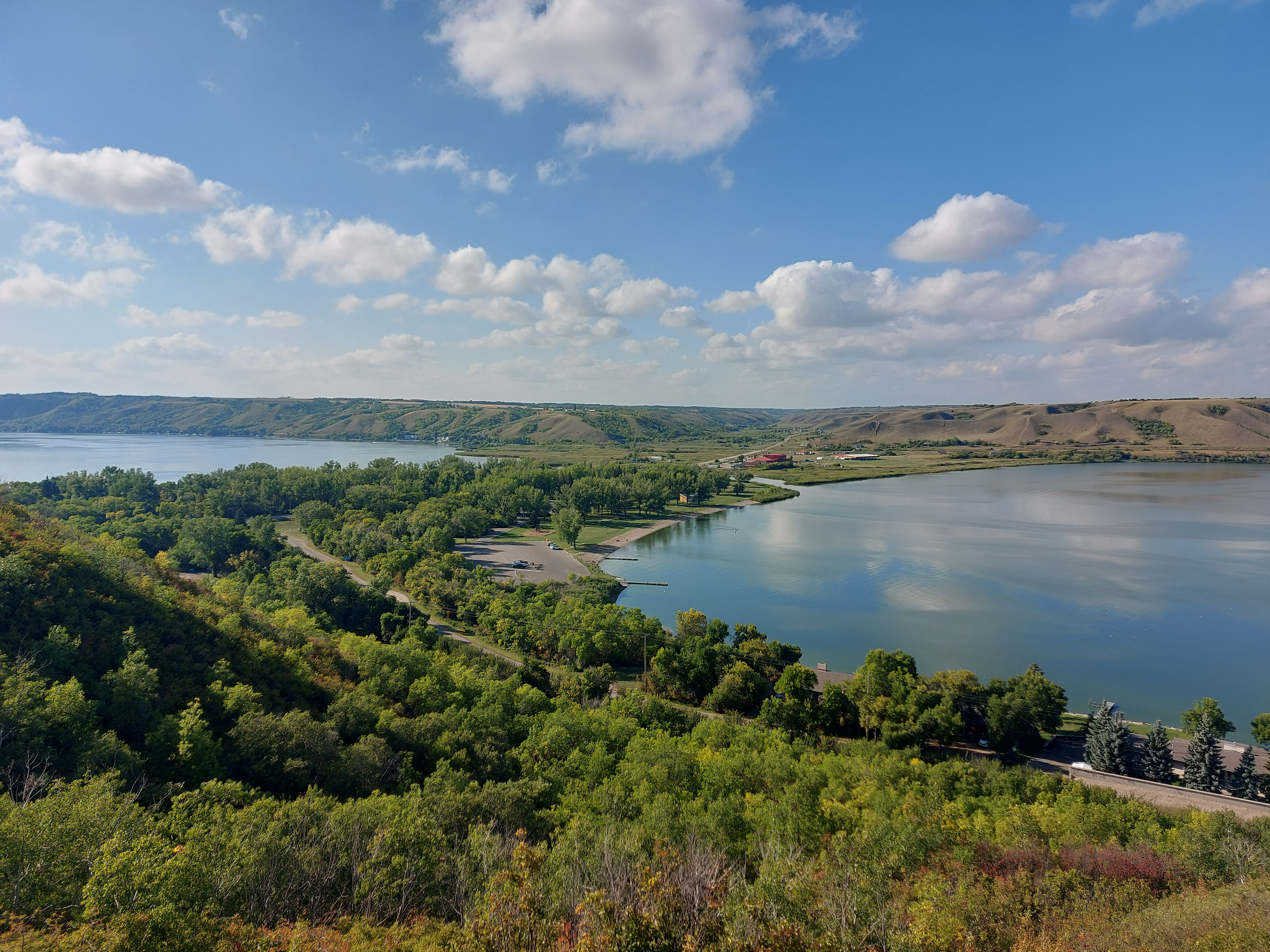
- Pasqua (left) and Echo (right) Lakes with Echo Valley Provincial Park and Standing Buffalo 78 Indian reserve in the middle
- Interactive map of Fishing Lakes
- Location: Saskatchewan, Canada
- Coordinates: 50.75°N 103.85°W
- Type: Chain of interconnected freshwater lakes
- Part of: Red River drainage basin
- Primary inflows: Qu'Appelle River
- Primary outflows: Qu'Appelle River
- Surface area: 54 km^{2} (21 sq mi)
- Frozen: Between November and March
- Settlements: Fort Qu'Appelle

The Fishing Lakes, also called the Calling Lakes or the Qu'Appelle Lakes, are a chain of four lakes in the Qu'Appelle Valley cottage country about 64 kilometres (40 mi) to the north-east of Regina in the Canadian province of Saskatchewan. The lakes are in a region called the Prairie Pothole Region of North America, which extends throughout three Canadian provinces and five U.S. states. It is also within Palliser's Triangle and the Great Plains ecoregion. The Fishing Lakes all follow the course of the Qu'Appelle River, which flows from the west to the east and is part of the Hudson Bay drainage basin. The lakes sit in the deep-cut Qu'Appelle Valley that was formed about 14,000 years ago during the last ice age. Meltwater from the glaciers carved out the valley and as water levels rose and fell, alluvium was left in the wake. These piles of alluvium are what created the separations between the lakes.

The name Qu'Appelle is French for "Who's calling?" The name comes from First Nations people hearing their names while paddling the lakes. There has been some inclination to rename the Fishing Lakes as the "Calling Lakes" in order further to stress the legend of the Qu'Appelle Valley as popularised at the turn of the 20th century by E. Pauline Johnson. The effort has met with resistance from historically minded locals with authentic roots in the locale and has not met with success.

The lakes are primarily located in the RMs of North Qu'Appelle No. 187 and Abernethy No. 186. Several Indian reserves also border the lakes.

== The lakes ==
The Fishing Lakes are composed of four main lakes and one smaller lake. They are fed by the Qu'Appelle River, underground aquifers, and by numerous creeks flowing through coulees that open into the valley, such as Echo Valley Creek and Jumping Deer Creek.

- Pasqua Lake is the farthest west and upstream of the four main lakes. It was named after Chief Joseph Pasqua of the Pasqua First Nation.
- Echo Lake is the next one downstream from Pasqua. The lake is so named because of the echo heard by the First Nations while paddling on the lake.
- Mission Lake is the third lake. Mission lake is named after the Catholic Mission at Lebret.
- Katepwa Lake is the farthest east and downstream. The lake's name likely originated from the Cree word "Kahtapwao", which means 'What is calling?'
- Lake Muscowpetung is a small lake west of Pasqua Lake on the Muscowpetung Indian reserve. It is sometimes referred to as one of the Fishing Lakes.

The flow of water through the lakes is very sluggish. The Qu'Appelle river is little more than a small creek at this point in the Valley and, because the runoff from the surrounding farmland contains large amounts of farm fertilizer, the lakes have regularly been subject to severe attacks of algae during summer since the middle of the 20th century. Often, by August each year, the beaches cannot be used for swimming and those who wish to swim must go to deeper water by boat.

Other lakes along the course of the Qu'Appelle River include: Eyebrow Lake, Buffalo Pound Lake, Crooked Lake, and Round Lake.

=== Gallery ===
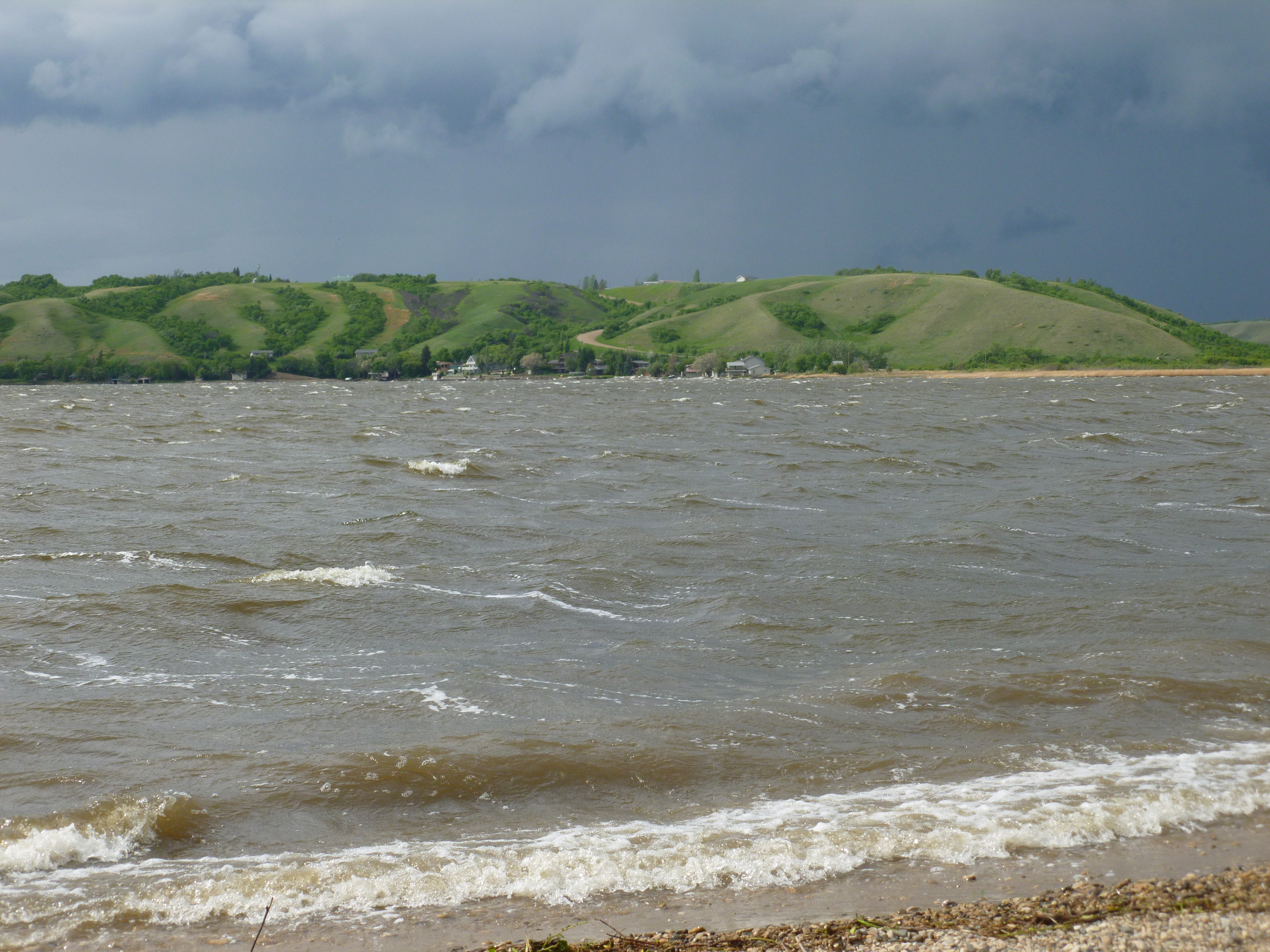
Pasqua Lake

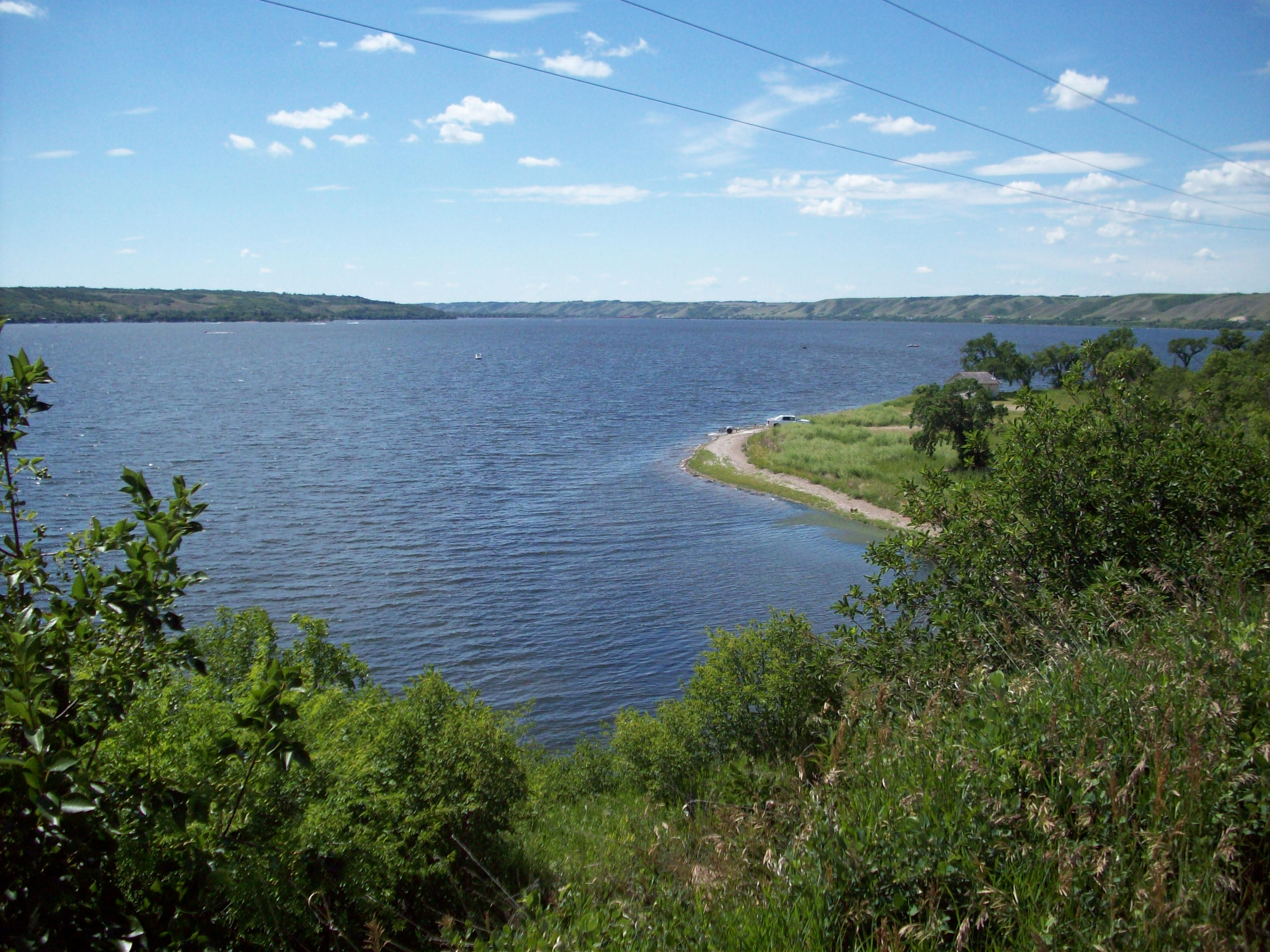
Echo Lake, south shore

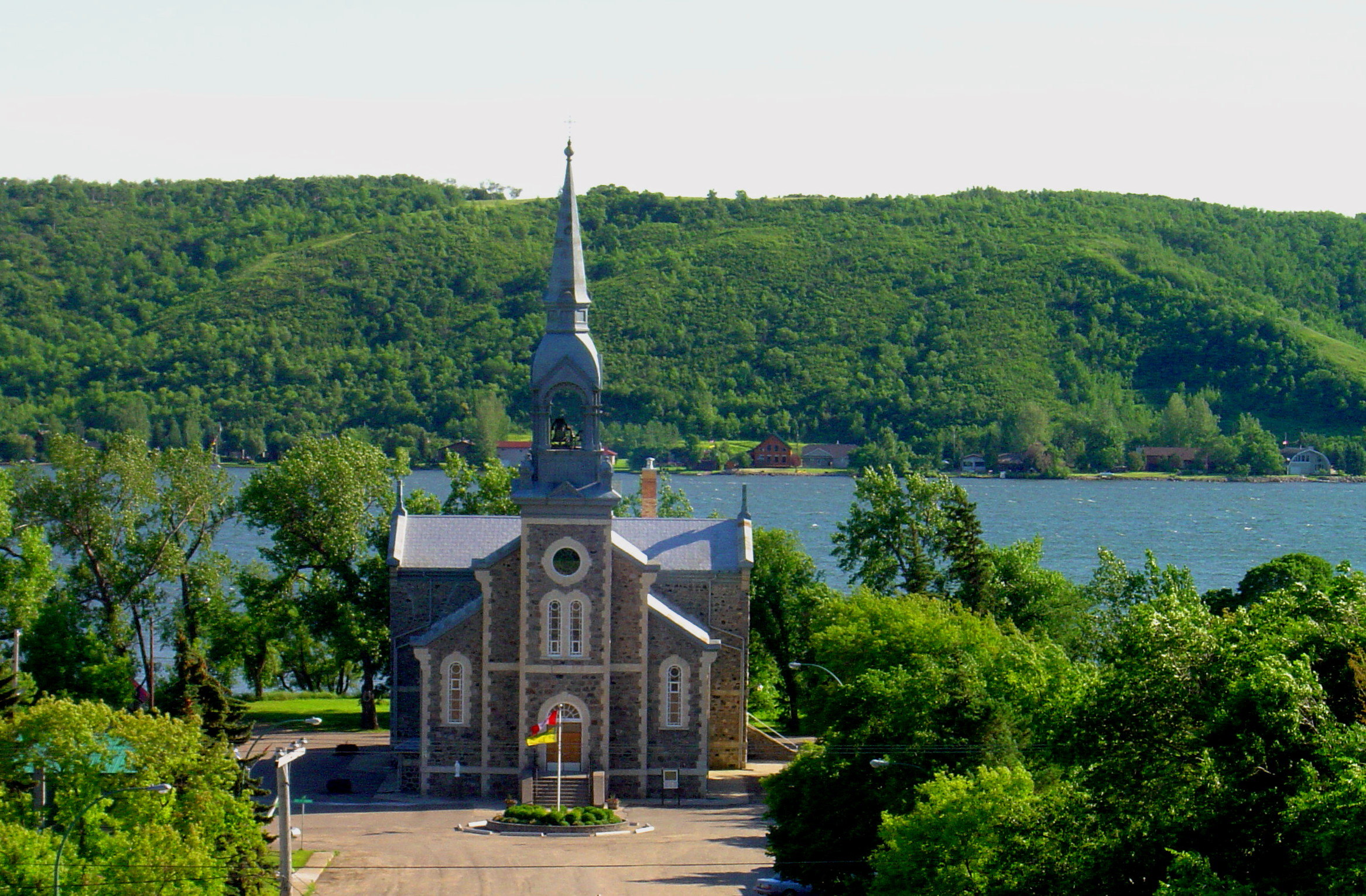
Sacred Heart Roman Catholic Church at Lebret with Mission Lake in the background

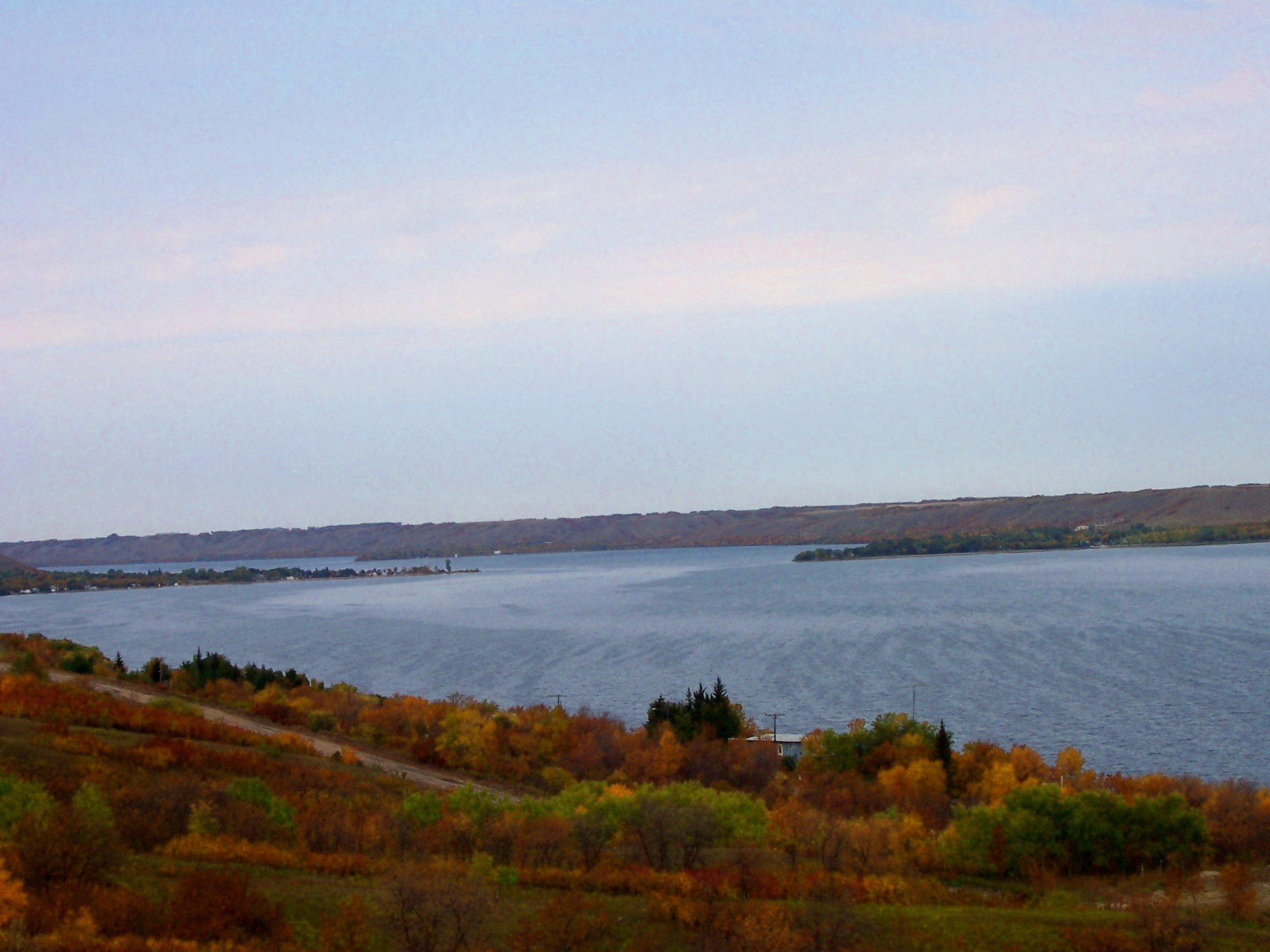
Katepwa Lake

== Communities ==
The town of Fort Qu'Appelle is the largest community in the area around the Fishing Lakes. It is located between Echo and Mission Lakes and was originally a Hudson's Bay Company trading post. The original factor's buildings are maintained as a museum. Being the largest community, Fort Qu'Appelle serves as the main service centre for the area.

There are several small resort villages around the lakes, including Katepwa, Lebret, Fort San, Pasqua Lake, and B-Say-Tah. Fort San housed Saskatchewan's tuberculosis sanatorium until 1925. The building is on the Canadian Register of Historic Places.

First Nations around the lakes include the Standing Buffalo Indian Reserve, Pasqua Indian Reserve, Muscowpetung Indian Reserve, Carry the Kettle Indian Reserve, and the Wa-pii-moos-toosis Indian Reserve. On the Wa-pii-moos-toosis Reserve was the Qu'Appelle Indian Residential School which operated from 1884 to 1969. It was one of the earliest residential schools in Western Canada.

The lakes are accessed by several highways, including Highways 22, 35, 56, 210, 619, and 727.

=== Gallery ===
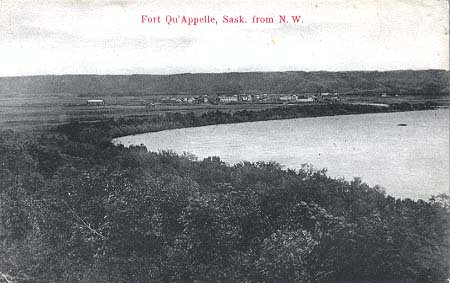
Fort Qu'Appelle from across Echo Lake, viewed from the north-west, c. 1910

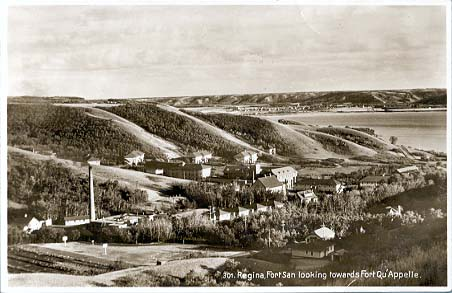
Fort San looking towards Fort Qu'Appelle, 1920s

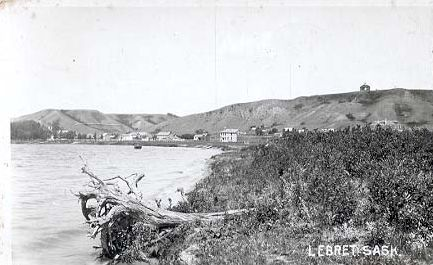
Qu'Appelle Indian Residential School on Mission Lake in 1921

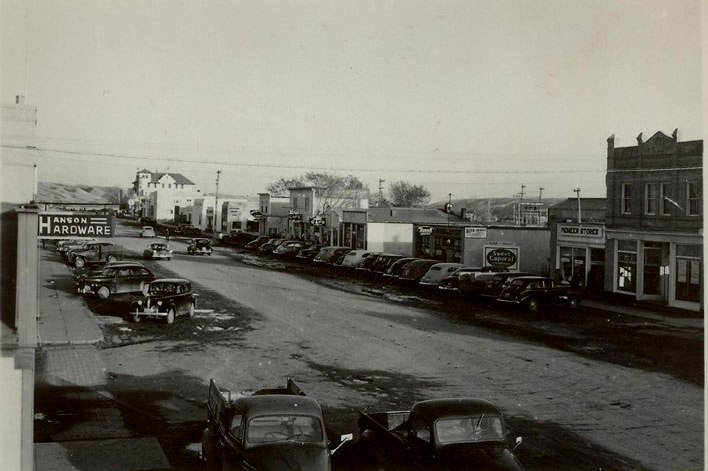
Fort Qu'Appelle, Broadway Street, c. 1948

== Recreation ==
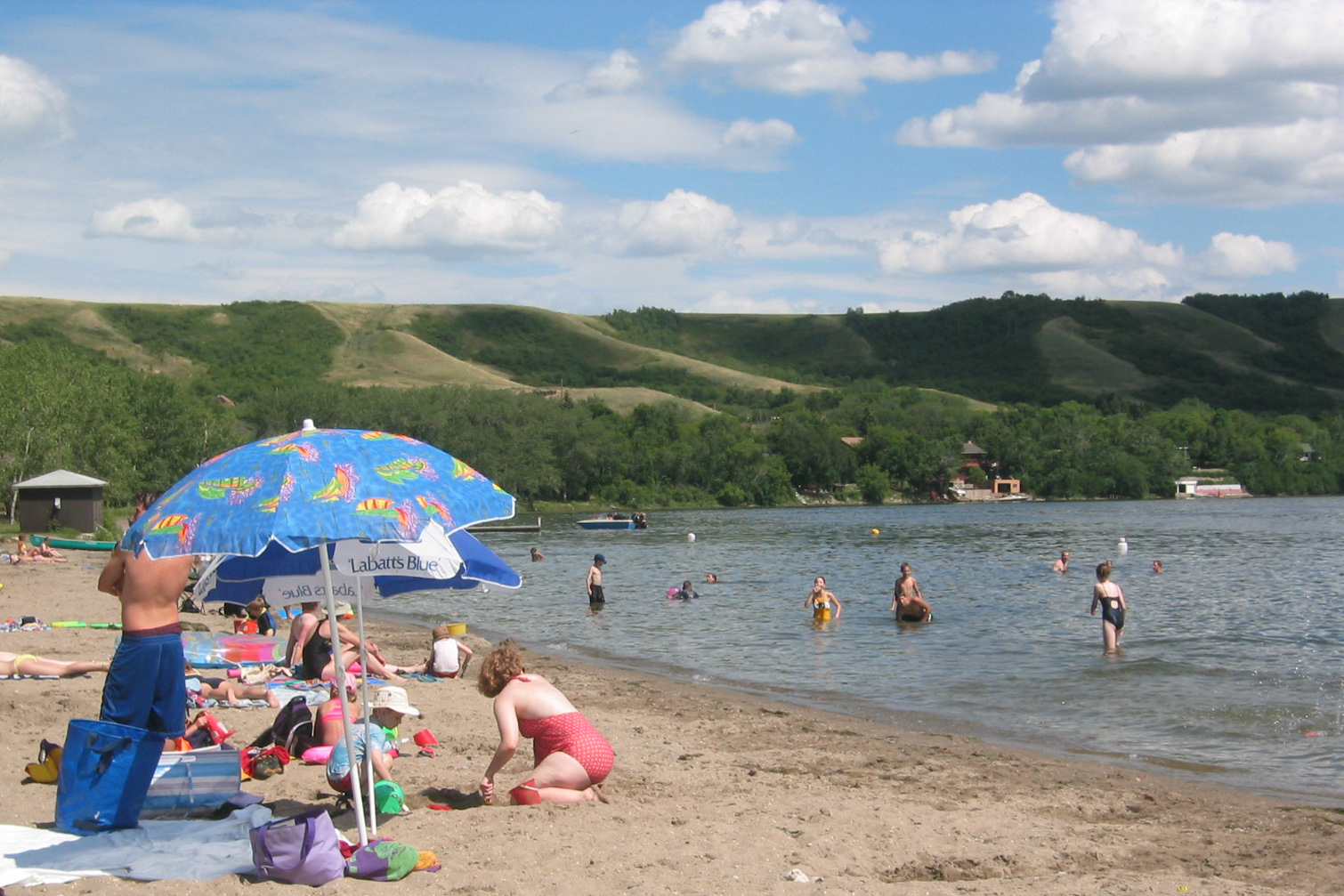
Katepwa Lake

The Fishing Lakes are home to two provincial parks, public swimming beaches, hiking trails, a ski resort, and are intermittently built up with private cottages and youth summer camps.

- Echo Valley Provincial Park is located between Pasqua and Echo Lakes and offers camping, beaches, boating, hiking, and, in the winter, cross-country skiing.
- Katepwa Point Provincial Park is one of the oldest provincial parks in Saskatchewan.
- Mission Ridge Winter Park is located south-east of Fort Qu'Appelle, at the south-west corner of Mission Lake on the Qu'Appelle Valley wall.

There are several beaches open to the public on the lakes, including 2 at Echo Valley Provincial Park, B-Say-Tah Beach, Fort Qu’Appelle Town Centre, and Katepwa Point Provincial Park. Public boat launches are available at B-Say-Tah Beach, Katepwa Point, Fort Qu’Appelle Town Centre, Echo Valley Provincial Park, and Lebret.

Throughout the lakes, there are several trails including sections of the Trans Canada Trail. Near Katepwa Lake at the eastern end is the historic Fort Ellice-Fort Qu'Appelle trail. Part of the trail has been turned into a gravel road and some of it remains hikeable. The trail was used from the 1830s to bring furs from the west, east to Fort Garry. From the 1850s, explorers and settlers heading west used this trail. The trail was part of a wide network of trails that ran across the Canadian Prairies. Several famous explorers used this trail, including John Palliser, James Hector, Henry Youle Hind, and James Carnegie, 9th Earl of Southesk. With the coming of the Canadian Pacific Railway's Transcontinental railway in 1882, the trail lost its importance and faded away as a route to the west.

== See also ==
- List of lakes of Saskatchewan
- Hudson Bay drainage basin
- List of protected areas of Saskatchewan
