= B-Say-Tah =

- Resort village
- Resort Village of B-Say-Tah
- Location within Saskatchewan
- Coordinates: 50.781°N 103.837°W
- Country: Canada
- Province: Saskatchewan
- Census division: 6
- Rural municipality: RM of North Qu'Appelle No. 187
- Incorporated: August 6, 1915

Government
  - Mayor: Isaac Sneath
  - Governing body: Resort Village Council
  - Administrator: Richelle Haanstra

Area (2016)
  - Land: 1.33 km^{2} (0.51 sq mi)

Population (2016)
  - Total: 156
  - Density: 117.3/km^{2} (304/sq mi)
- Time zone: CST
  - Summer (DST): CST
- Area codes: 306 and 639
- Highway(s): Highway 210
- Waterway(s): Echo Lake
- Website: Official website

B-Say-Tah (English: /biːˈseɪtɑː/) (2016 population: 156) is a resort village in the Canadian province of Saskatchewan within Census Division No. 6. It is on the shores of Echo Lake of the Fishing Lakes in the Rural Municipality of North Qu'Appelle No. 187. It is approximately 70 kilometres (43 mi) north-east of Regina and 5 kilometres (3.1 mi) west of Fort Qu'Appelle on Highway 210. Echo Valley Provincial Park is 2 kilometres (1.2 mi) to the west.

On the west side of the community is the Saskatchewan Fish Hatchery, which is the only Aquaculture facility in Saskatchewan that produces fish for recreational purposes.

== History ==
B-Say-Tah incorporated as a resort village on August 6, 1915.

== Demographics ==
Population history (1981–2016)
Year	Pop.	±%
1981	112	—
1986	117	+4.5%
1991	174	+48.7%
1996	159	−8.6%
2001	177	+11.3%
2006	206	+16.4%
2011	187	−9.2%
2016	156	−16.6%
Source: Statistics Canada via Saskatchewan Bureau of Statistics

In the 2021 Census of Population conducted by Statistics Canada, B-Say-Tah had a population of 177 living in 95 of its 265 total private dwellings, a change of 13.5% from its 2016 population of 156. With a land area of 1.02 km^{2} (0.39 sq mi), it had a population density of 173.5/km^{2} (449.4/sq mi) in 2021.

In the 2016 Census of Population conducted by Statistics Canada, the Resort Village of B-Say-Tah recorded a population of 156 living in 74 of its 237 total private dwellings, a −16.6% change from its 2011 population of 187. With a land area of 1.33 km^{2} (0.51 sq mi), it had a population density of 117.3/km^{2} (303.8/sq mi) in 2016.

== Government ==
The Resort Village of B-Say-Tah is governed by an elected municipal council and an appointed administrator that meets on the third Tuesday of every month. The mayor is Isaac Sneath and its administrator is Richelle Haanstra.

== See also ==
- List of communities in Saskatchewan
- List of francophone communities in Saskatchewan
- List of municipalities in Saskatchewan
- List of resort villages in Saskatchewan
- List of villages in Saskatchewan
- List of summer villages in Alberta
