= Muscowpetung 80 =

Indian reserve in Saskatchewan, Canada

Coordinates: 50°46′02″N 104°13′49″W

- Indian Reserve
- Muscowpetung Indian Reserve No. 80
- Location in Saskatchewan
- First Nation: Muscowpetung
- Country: Canada
- Province: Saskatchewan

Area
  - Total: 8,849 ha (21,870 acres)

Population (2016)
  - Total: 275
  - Density: 3.11/km^{2} (8.05/sq mi)
- Community Well-Being Index: 54

Muscowpetung 80 is an Indian reserve of the Muscowpetung First Nation in Saskatchewan. It is 31 kilometres (19 mi) west of Fort Qu'Appelle along the south-west shore of Pasqua Lake, which is one of four Fishing Lakes. In the 2016 Canadian Census, it recorded a population of 275 living in 87 of its 112 total private dwellings. In the same year, its Community Well-Being index was calculated at 54 of 100, compared to 58.4 for the average First Nations community and 77.5 for the average non-Indigenous community.

Lake Muscowpetung, which is a small lake on the Muscowpetung Indian Reserve along the Qu'Appelle River, is sometimes referred to as one of the Fishing Lakes. It is located just west of Pasqua Lake.

== See also ==
- List of Indian reserves in Saskatchewan
