= Muscowpetung Saulteaux Nation =

First Nation in Saskatchewan, Canada

- Band No. 381
- People: Saulteaux
- Treaty: Treaty 4
- Headquarters: Fort Qu'Appelle
- Province: Saskatchewan

Land
- Other reserve: Muscowpetung 80
- Land area: 88.49 km^{2} (34.17 sq mi)

Population (2026)
- On reserve: 500
- Off reserve: 1100
- Total population: 1600

Government
- Chief: Melissa Tavita
- Council: Myke Agecoutay; Courtney Dawn Anaquod; Cody Wayne Keepness; Terance Cappo; Byron Toto

Tribal Council
- File Hills Qu'Appelle Tribal Council

Website
- muscowpetung.com

The Muscowpetung Saulteaux Nation (Ojibwe: mashkawabiidoong, In syllabics, written as ᒪᐢᑯᐘᐲᑕᐣᐠ) is a Saulteaux band government in southern Saskatchewan, Canada. Their reserves include:

- Last Mountain Lake 80A, shared with 6 other bands
- Muscowpetung 80
- Treaty Four Reserve Grounds 77, shared with 32 other bands.

== History ==
1874–1909: The Queen's representatives set apart reserve land and entered into Treaty 4, also known as the Qu'Appelle Treaty on September 15, 1874 at Fort Qu'Appelle, Saskatchewan, with the Muscowpetung Saulteaux band. In exchange for payments, provisions and rights to reserve lands, Treaty 4 ceded Indigenous territory to the federal government.

1909: On January 4, 1909, band members and elders were summoned at noon by an Indian Agent who claimed he was representing the Crown. At 11:00 pm those in attendance gave in to pressure and accepted cash payments offered by the agent in exchange for 17,600 acres of prime agricultural land amounting to almost 47% of the original reserve area. There were several documented cases of Indian Agents purchasing surrendered land despite the Indian Act prohibiting such purchases.

The power of Indian Agents and other Department officials over life on reserves was impressive, and was an important influencing factor in the context of surrenders. Under the pass system that was employed after 1885, band members were required to obtain passes from the Agents in order to leave their reserves. This system served to restrict movement between reserves and to prevent political and religious gatherings. Agents also supervised spending and distributed housing, clothing, and rations. In all these matters, Agents were given a good deal of discretion, loosely supervised by regional Inspectors.

In 2023, the Muscowpetung Saulteaux Nation reached a settlement agreement with the Government of Canada regarding breach of statutory and fiduciary duties relating to the 1909 surrender of 18,352 acres of reserve lands. The claim had first been submitted in 1990. The settlement agreement provided total compensation of $150 million and included the potential to add the lost acres back to the reserve.

In 2025, there was a move to change the name of the community to Cheekuk Anishinaabe Nation after the community's signatory to Treaty 4, Chief Cheekuk who preceded Chief Muscowpetung as leader of the community until his death in 1880.
