= Echo Valley Provincial Park =

Provincial park in Saskatchewan, Canada

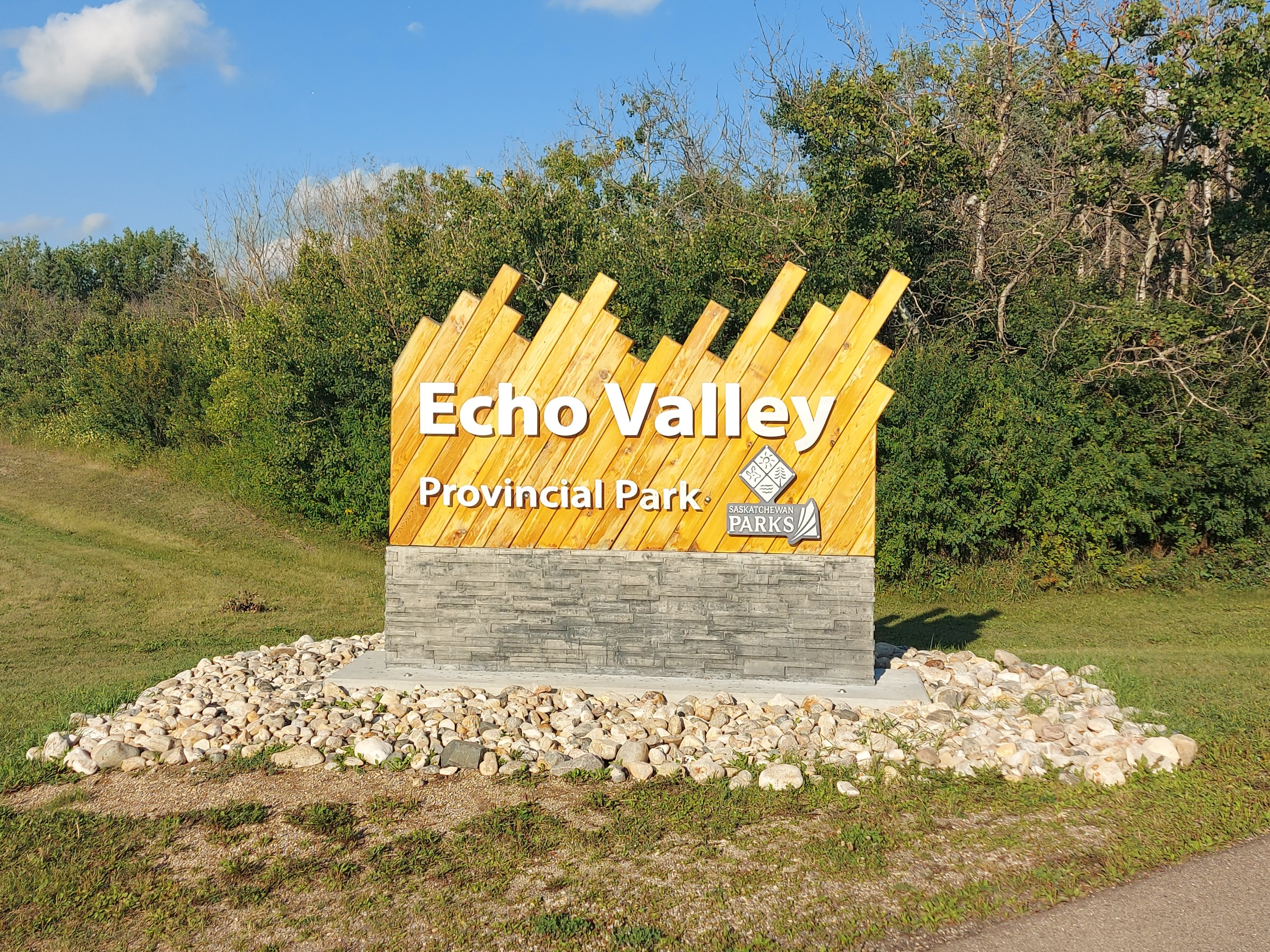
- Echo Valley Provincial Park

- Location within Saskatchewan Location within Canada
- Interactive map of Echo Valley Provincial Park
- Location: Saskatchewan
- Nearest city: Fort Qu'Appelle
- Coordinates: 50.7881°N 103.8917°W
- Area: 654 ha (1,620 acres)
- Established: 1960
- Governing body: Sask Parks

Echo Valley Provincial Park is a provincial park in the Canadian province of Saskatchewan, located west of the town of Fort Qu'Appelle in the Qu'Appelle Valley between Echo Lake and Pasqua Lake in the RM of North Qu'Appelle No. 187. The three main roads to access the park are Highways 210, 56, and 727.

Echo Valley Provincial Park is situated on the southern shores and the isthmus between Echo and Pasqua Lakes with the northern boundary being the spot where the Qu'Appelle River cuts through the isthmus, which is called Sioux Crossing. There are two beach areas, one on each lake on either side of the isthmus. There are also over 300 campsites in the portion of the park on the south side of the lakes.

== Attractions and amenities ==
Nestled between two lakes, there are many attractions and recreational opportunities in the park. Both lakes have beach access for swimming, picnicking, beach volleyball, playgrounds, mini golf, fishing, and boating. The beaches are sandy and there's a public boat launch. Echo Lake, the lake to east, has a more developed beach area than Pasqua.

There are over 300 campsites in the park and most are electrified. The sites are divided into several different campgrounds, including Lakeview A, Lakeview B, Valleyview, Morningview, Aspen, and Prince Edward. Valleyview is the largest with 245 sites and Morningview is the only full-service campground. All campgrounds have access to potable water and washrooms.

The park has a 3 km (1.9 mi) hiking trail that winds through the forests and coulees.

In the winter, the roads of the Aspen Campground are turned into skating trails in the annual Skate the Park event. There are also cross-country ski trails set up and snow shoes are available for rent. Winter camping is available and through Camp-Easy, yurts are available for rent.

== Gallery ==
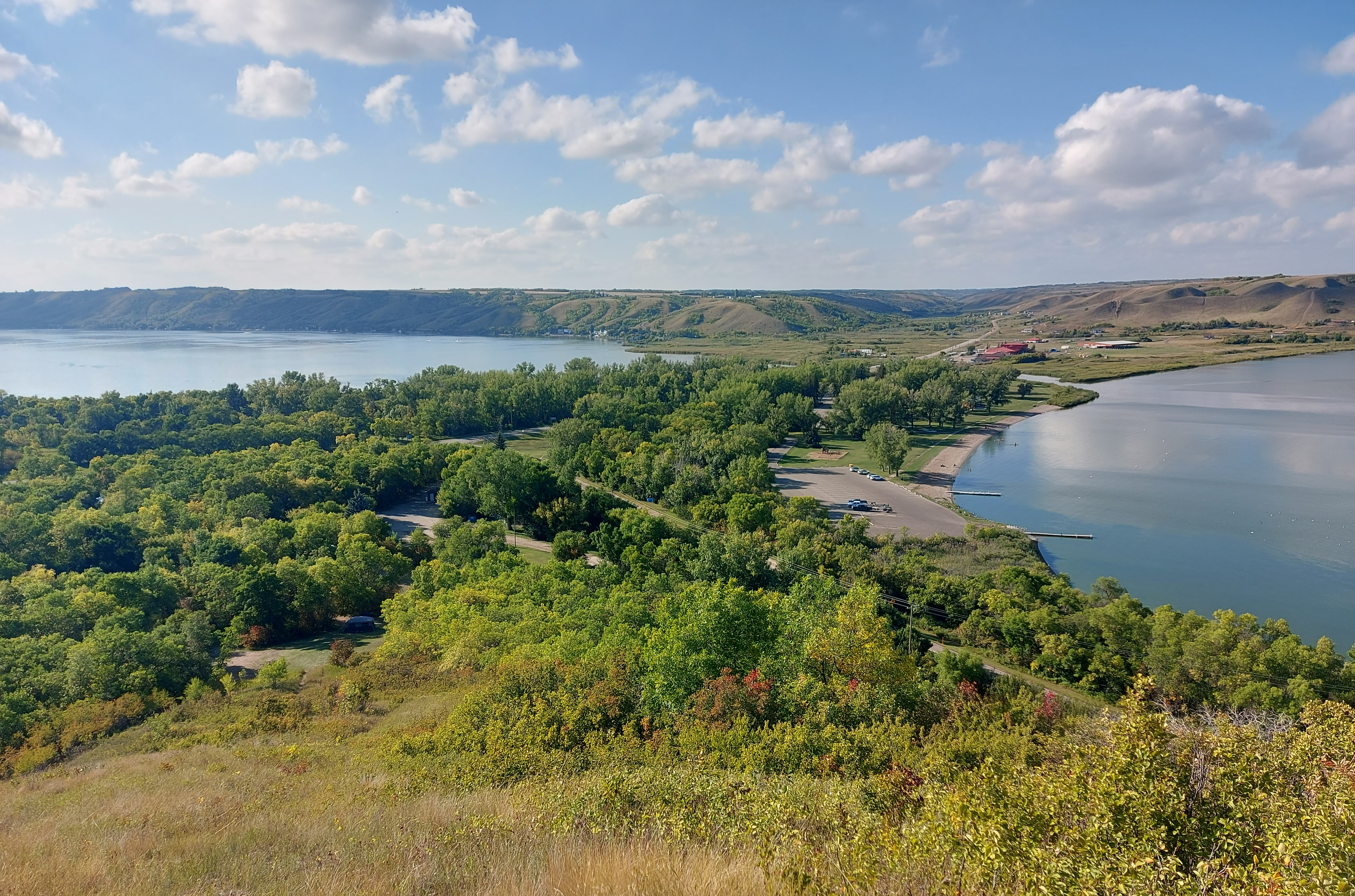
Echo Valley Provincial Park between Pasqua and Echo Lakes

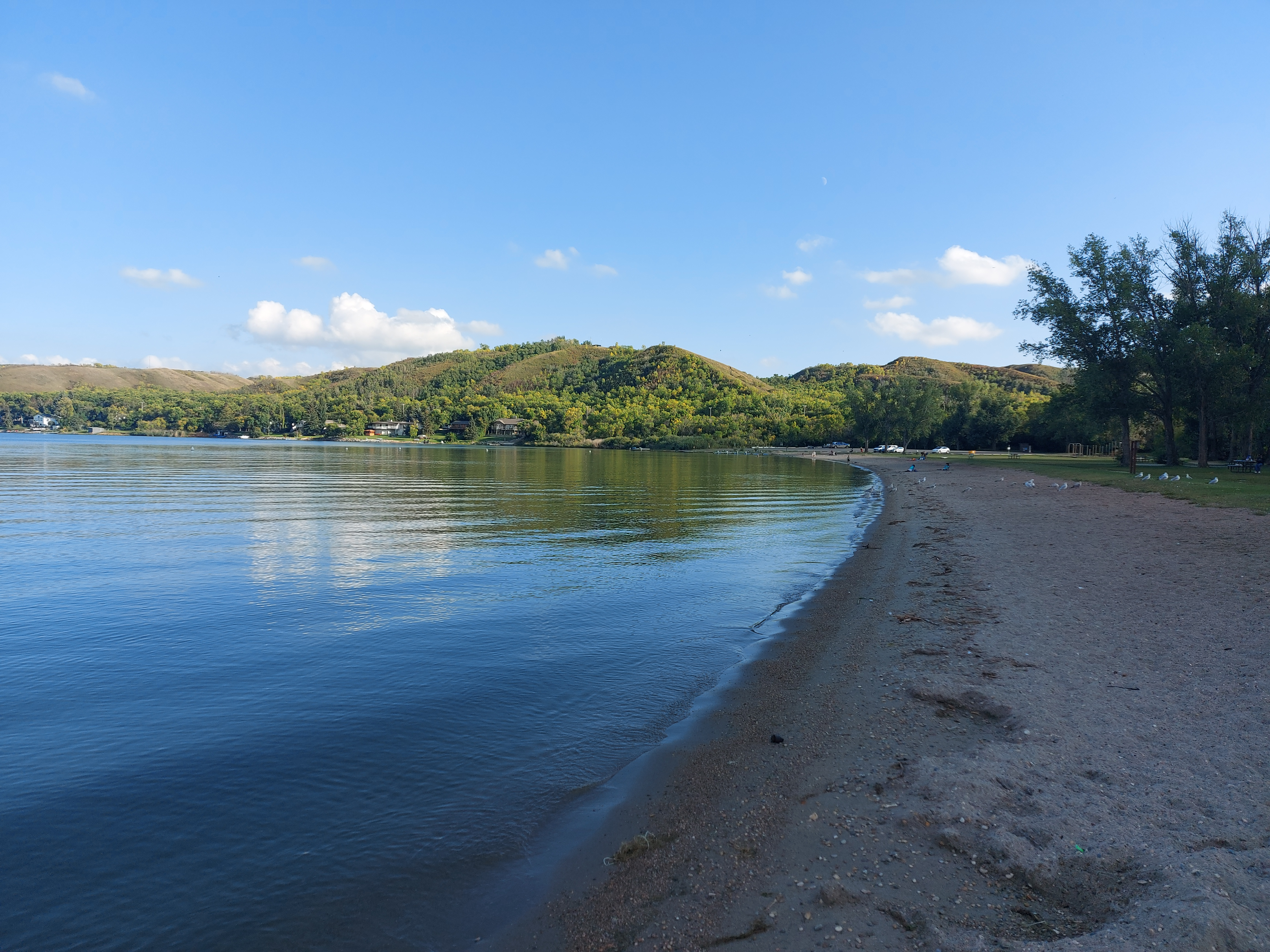
Fort Qu'Appelle Beach, Echo Lake

== See also ==
- List of protected areas of Saskatchewan
- Tourism in Saskatchewan
