= Saskatchewan Highway 56 =

Provincial highway in Saskatchewan, Canada

Highway 56
- Highway 56 highlighted in red
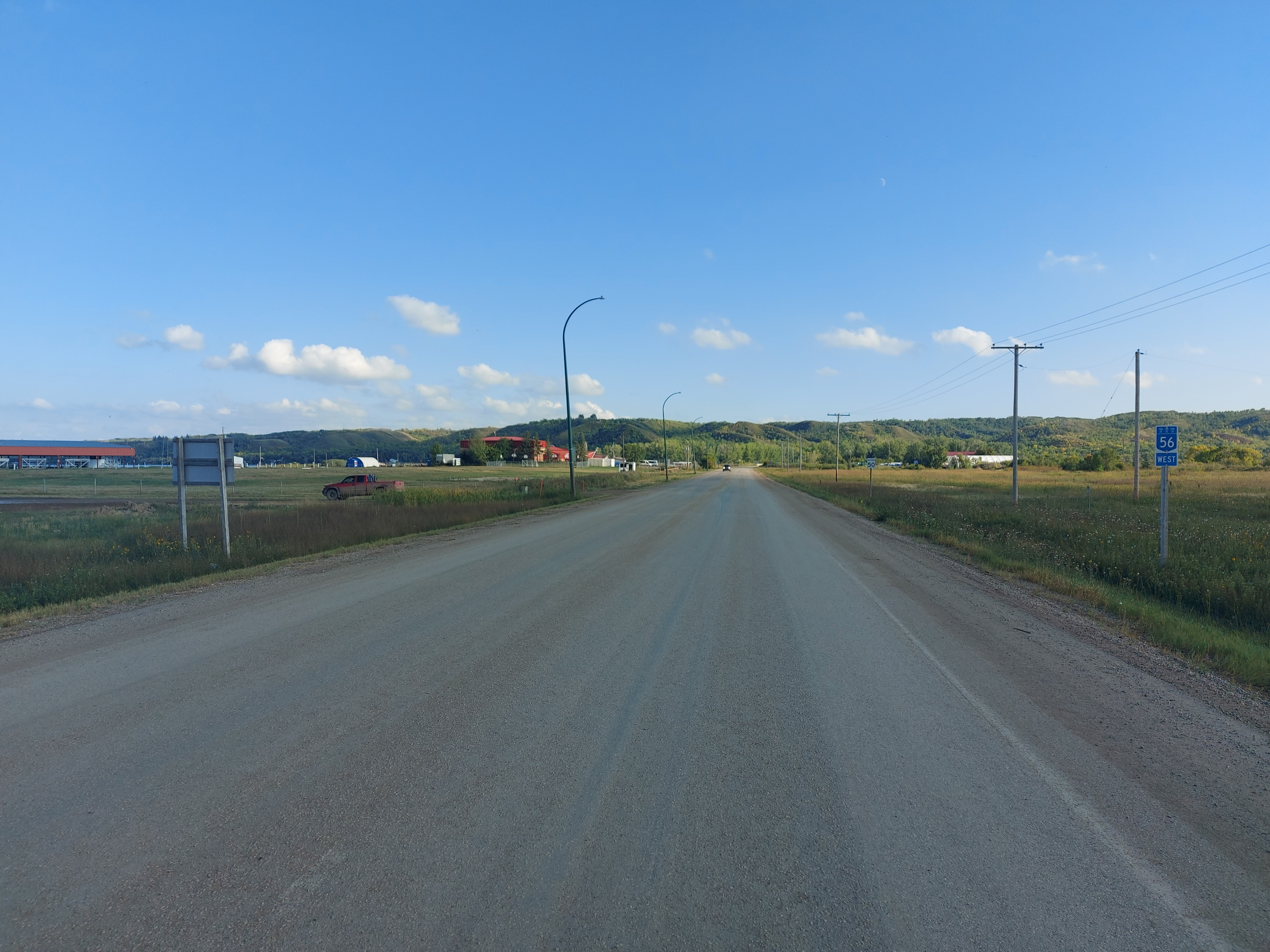
- Hwy 56 through the Standing Buffalo IR

Route information
- Maintained by Ministry of Highways and Infrastructure
- Length: 55.4 km (34.4 mi)

Major junctions
- South end: Highway 1 (TCH) at Indian Head
- Highway 10 / Highway 35 at Fort Qu'Appelle
- North end: Highway 210 in Echo Valley Provincial Park

Location
- Country: Canada
- Province: Saskatchewan
- Rural municipalities: Indian Head, Abernethy, North Qu'Appelle

Highway system
- Provincial highways in Saskatchewan
← Highway 55	→ Highway 57

Highway 56 is a provincial highway in the Canadian province of Saskatchewan. The highway runs from Highway 1 near Indian Head to Highway 210 within Echo Valley Provincial Park. It is about 55 kilometres (34 mi) long.

Highway 56 travels along the eastern shore of Katepwa Lake and the northern shores of Mission and Echo Lakes of the Fishing Lakes.

== Major intersections ==
From south to north:

Rural municipality	Location	km	mi	Destinations	Notes
Indian Head No. 156	Indian Head	0.0	0.0	Highway 1 (TCH) (Hwy 619 south) – Regina, Winnipeg	Southern terminus; southern end of Hwy 619 concurrency
↑ / ↓	Katepwa South	24.2	15.0	Crosses the Qu'Appelle River	
Abernethy No. 186	Katepwa Beach	26.9	16.7	Highway 619 north – Balcarres	Northern end of Hwy 619 concurrency
North Qu'Appelle No. 187	Fort Qu'Appelle	44.2	27.5	Highway 35 to Highway 10 – Yorkton, Regina, Wadena	
North Qu'Appelle No. 187	Fort San	49.0	30.4		
North Qu'Appelle No. 187		54.3	33.7	Highway 727 west	
North Qu'Appelle No. 187	Echo Valley Provincial Park	54.8	34.1	Crosses the Qu'Appelle River	
North Qu'Appelle No. 187	Echo Valley Provincial Park	55.4	34.4	Highway 210 – Fort Qu'Appelle, Hwy 10	Northern terminus
1.000 mi = 1.609 km; 1.000 km = 0.621 mi: Concurrency terminus

== Photo gallery ==
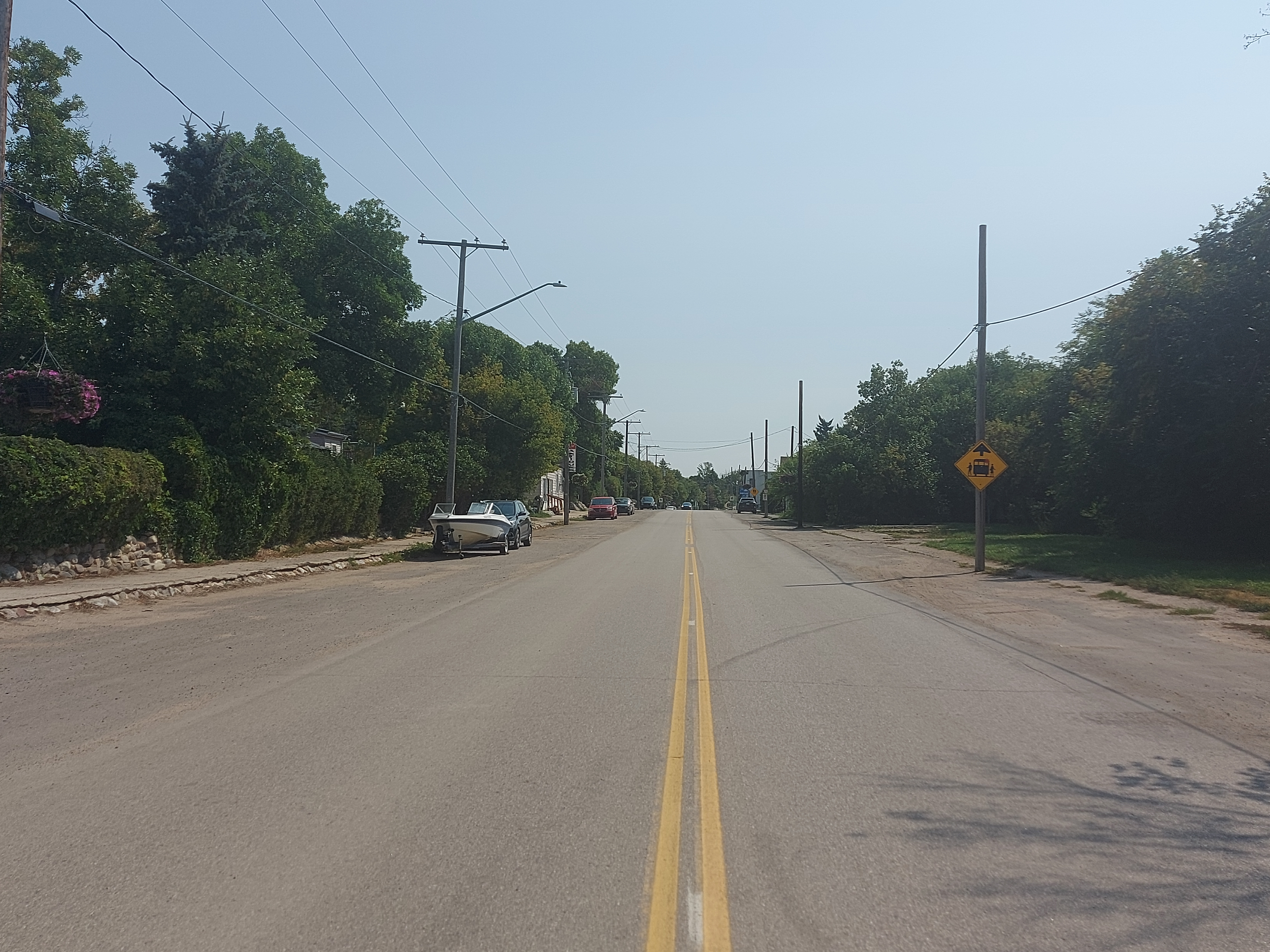
Hwy 56 through Lebret, facing east

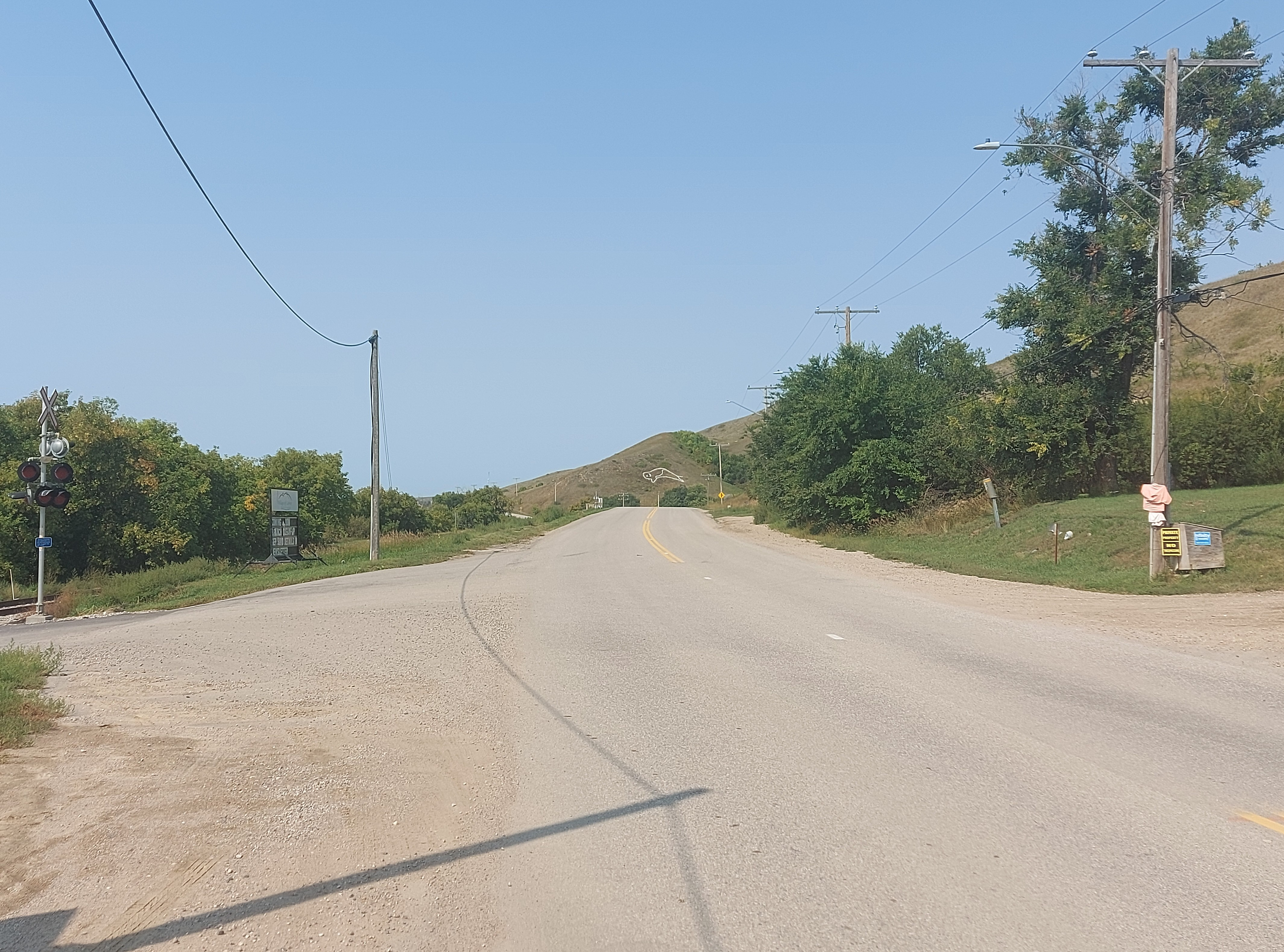
Hwy 56 through Lebret, facing west

== See also ==
- Transportation in Saskatchewan
- Roads in Saskatchewan
