= Echo Lake (Saskatchewan) =

Lake in Saskatchewan, Canada

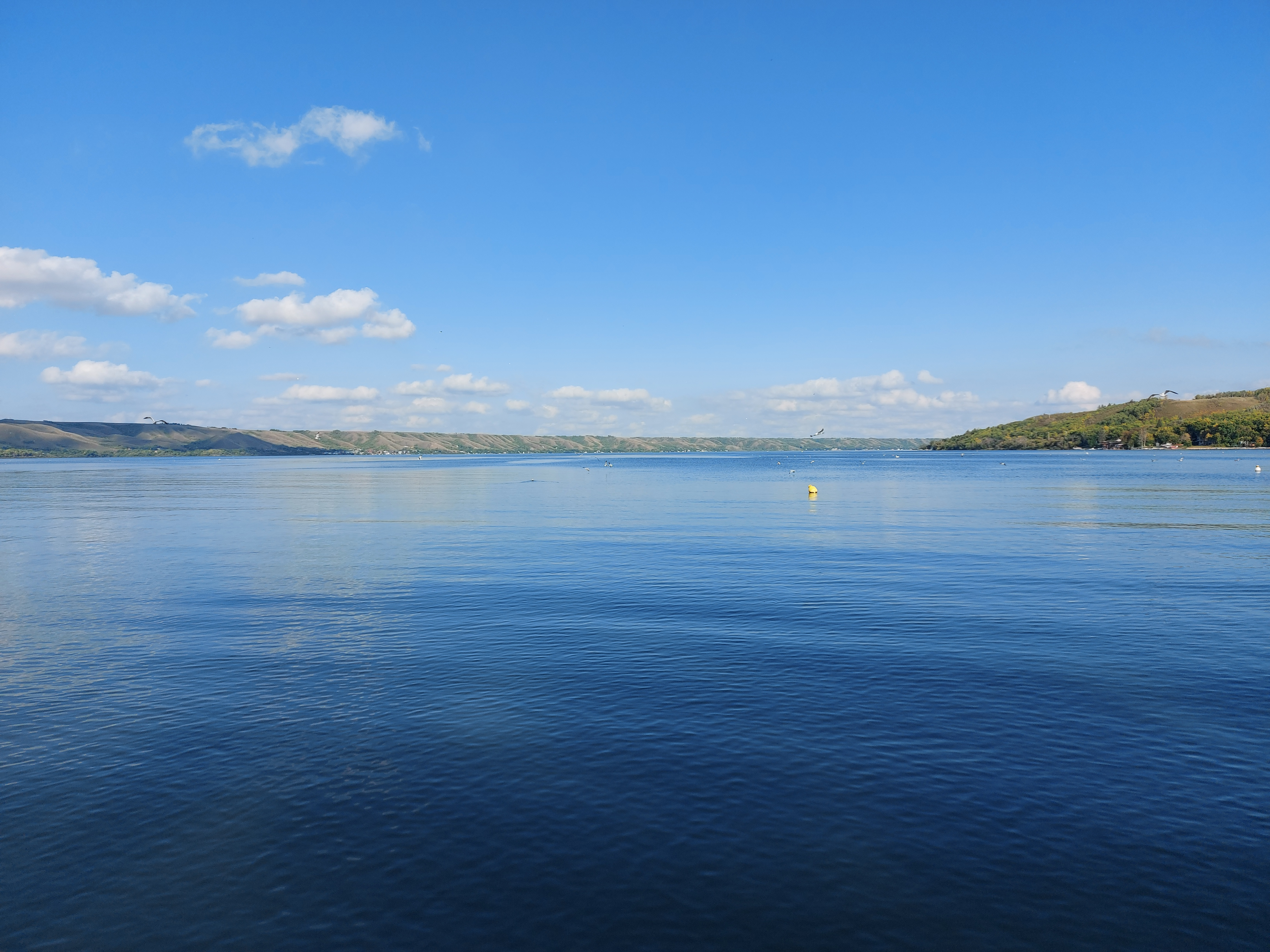
- Echo Lake

- Location in Saskatchewan Echo Lake (Canada)
- Location: Saskatchewan
- Group: Fishing Lakes
- Coordinates: 50°48′0″N 103°51′2″W
- Part of: Red River drainage basin
- Primary inflows: Qu'Appelle River at Sioux Crossing
- Primary outflows: Qu'Appelle River
- Basin countries: Canada
- Max. length: 5 km (3.1 mi)
- Max. width: 1.7 km (1.1 mi)
- Surface area: 1,296.3 ha (3,203 acres)
- Average depth: 9.8 m (32 ft)
- Max. depth: 22 m (72 ft)
- Water volume: 242,000 dam^{3} (196,000 acre⋅ft)
- Shore length^{1}: 16 km (9.9 mi)
- Surface elevation: 474 m (1,555 ft)
- Settlements: Fort Qu'Appelle
- ^{1} Shore length is not a well-defined measure.

Echo Lake is a lake along the course of the Qu'Appelle River in the Canadian province of Saskatchewan. Echo Lake is so named because of the echo heard by the First Nations while paddling on the lake. It is one of four lakes that make up the Fishing Lakes. Pasqua Lake is upstream and Mission Lake is downstream. The lake can be accessed by Highway 56 and Highway 210. In 1942, a 4-metre (13 ft) high dam was built on the Qu'Appelle River at Echo Lake's outflow to control the lake's water levels. In the summer of 2024, Saskatchewan's Water Security Agency began "interim repairs" on Echo Lake Dam to "improve safety and extend the dam's life until a replacement can be completed".

Echo Lake, as well as the other three Fishing Lakes, are all in the Qu'Appelle Valley, which was formed about 14,000 years ago during the last ice age. Meltwater from the glaciers carved out the valley and as water levels rose and fell, alluvium was left in the wake. These piles of alluvium are what created the separations between the lakes.

== Communities ==
Echo Lake is located in the RM of North Qu'Appelle No. 187. The town of Fort Qu'Appelle is the largest community, not just on Echo Lake, but all of the Fishing Lakes. It is located at the eastern end of the lake, between Echo and Mission Lakes. Echo Lake is home to two resort villages; B-Say-Tah is on a point of land along the southern shore and Fort San is located opposite B-Say-Tah on the northern shore. Standing Buffalo Indian reserve is located at the north-western corner of the lake and occupies the northern half of the isthmus that separated Echo Lake from Pasqua Lake.

== Recreation ==
Echo Valley Provincial Park is located at the western end of the lake, south of Standing Buffalo and west of B-Say-Tah. The park features camping, hiking, and access to both Pasqua and Echo Lakes for boating, swimming, and fishing. The beach at the park is called Echo Beach. Other beaches along the lake's shore include B-Say-Tah Point Beach and Fort Qu’Appelle Valley Centre beach.

Echo Lake Bible Camp is located west of Fort San along Highway 57.

== Saskatchewan Fish Hatchery ==
The Saskatchewan Fish Hatchery (formally Fort Qu’Appelle Fish Culture Station), originally established in 1913, is located along Highway 210, 5 kilometres (3.1 mi) west of Fort Qu'Appelle and 2 kilometres (1.2 mi) east of Echo Valley Provincial Park, on the west side of B-Say-Tah. The hatchery produces between 40 and 50 million total fish annually, including both exotic and native species, which includes 500,000 trout and 20 million walleye. The hatchery is responsible for stocking over 200 bodies of water in Saskatchewan, including up to 150 lakes. It is the only aquaculture facility in Saskatchewan that produces fish for public angling opportunities.

In November 2014, the administration of the Saskatchewan Fish Hatchery was transferred from the Government of Saskatchewan to the Saskatchewan Wildlife Federation. The operating costs are funded by Saskatchewan’s Fish and Wildlife Development Fund (FWDF).

== Fish species ==
Fish commonly found in Echo Lake include northern pike, walleye, and yellow perch.

== Gallery ==
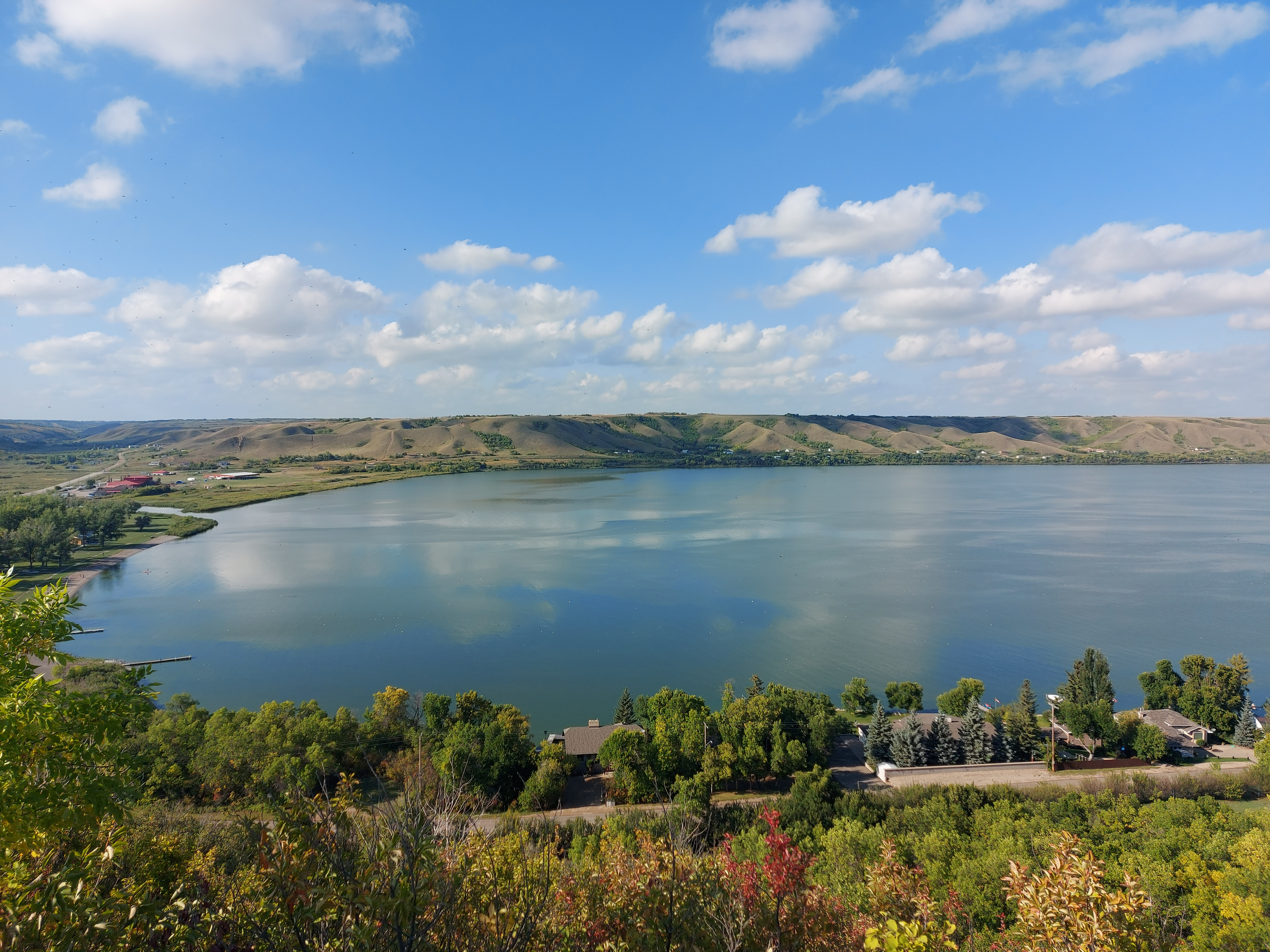
Echo Lake with Echo Valley Provincial Park to the left

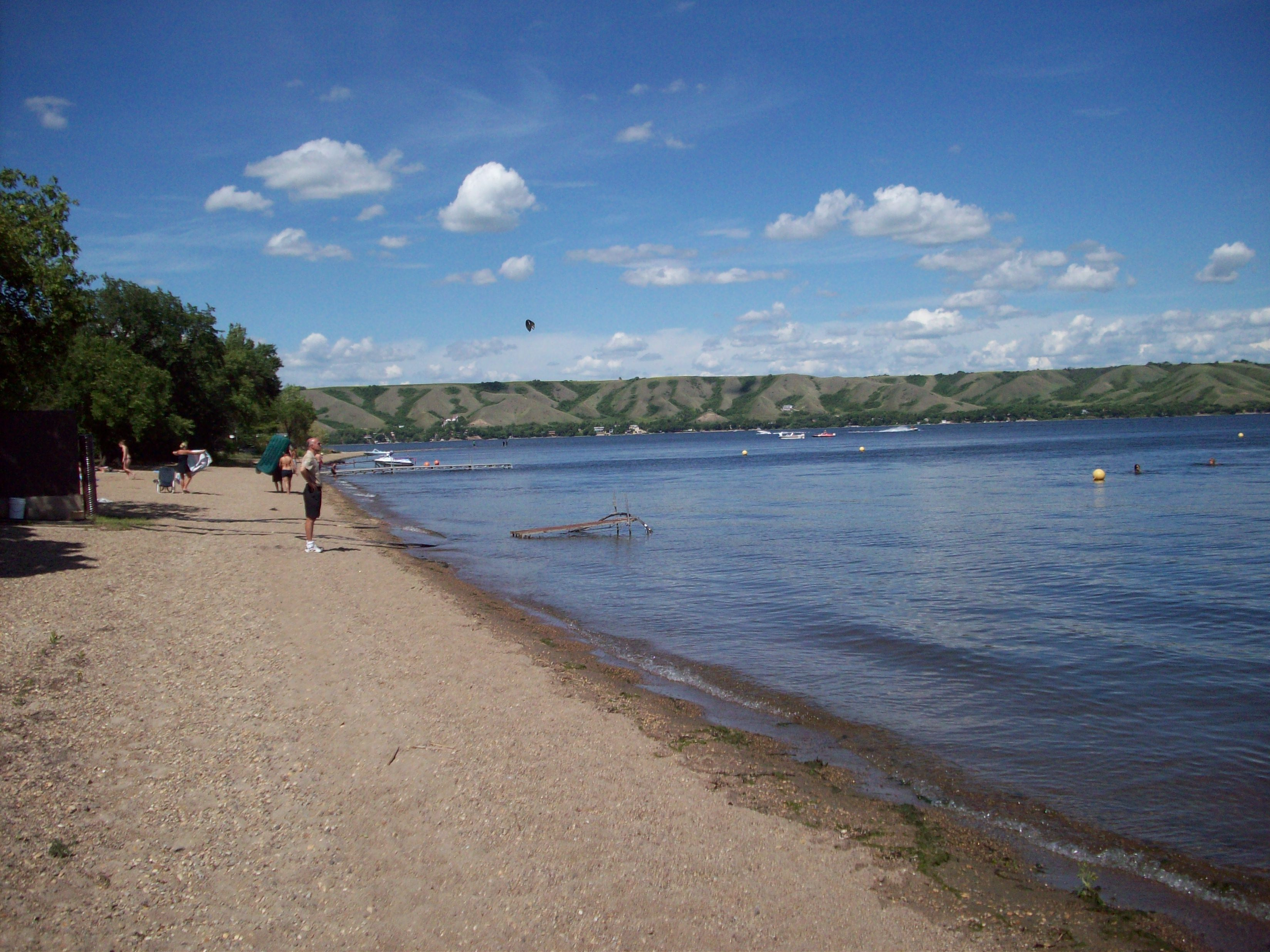
Echo Lake Beach, Echo Valley Provincial Park

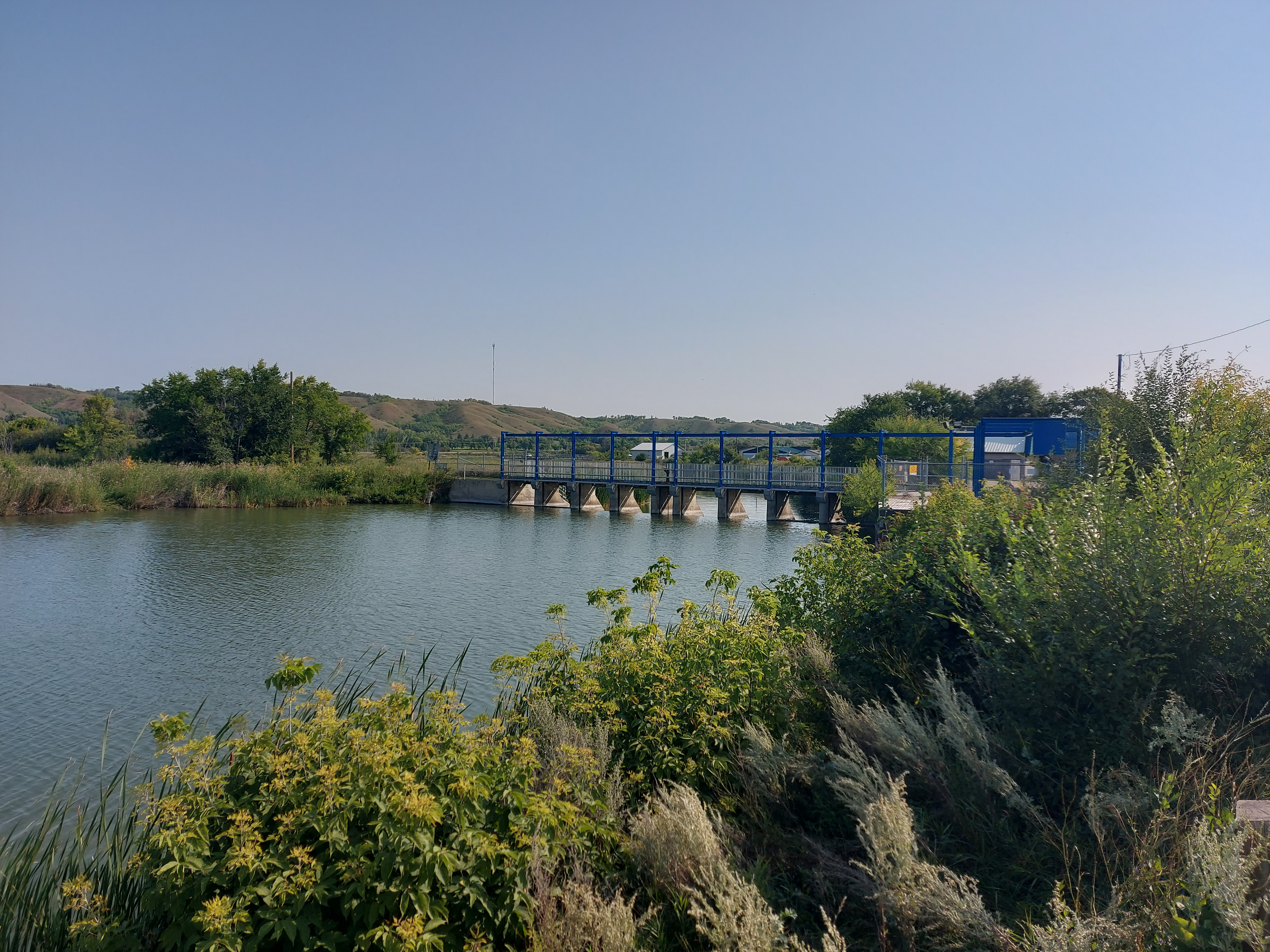
Echo Lake Dam at Fort Qu'Appelle

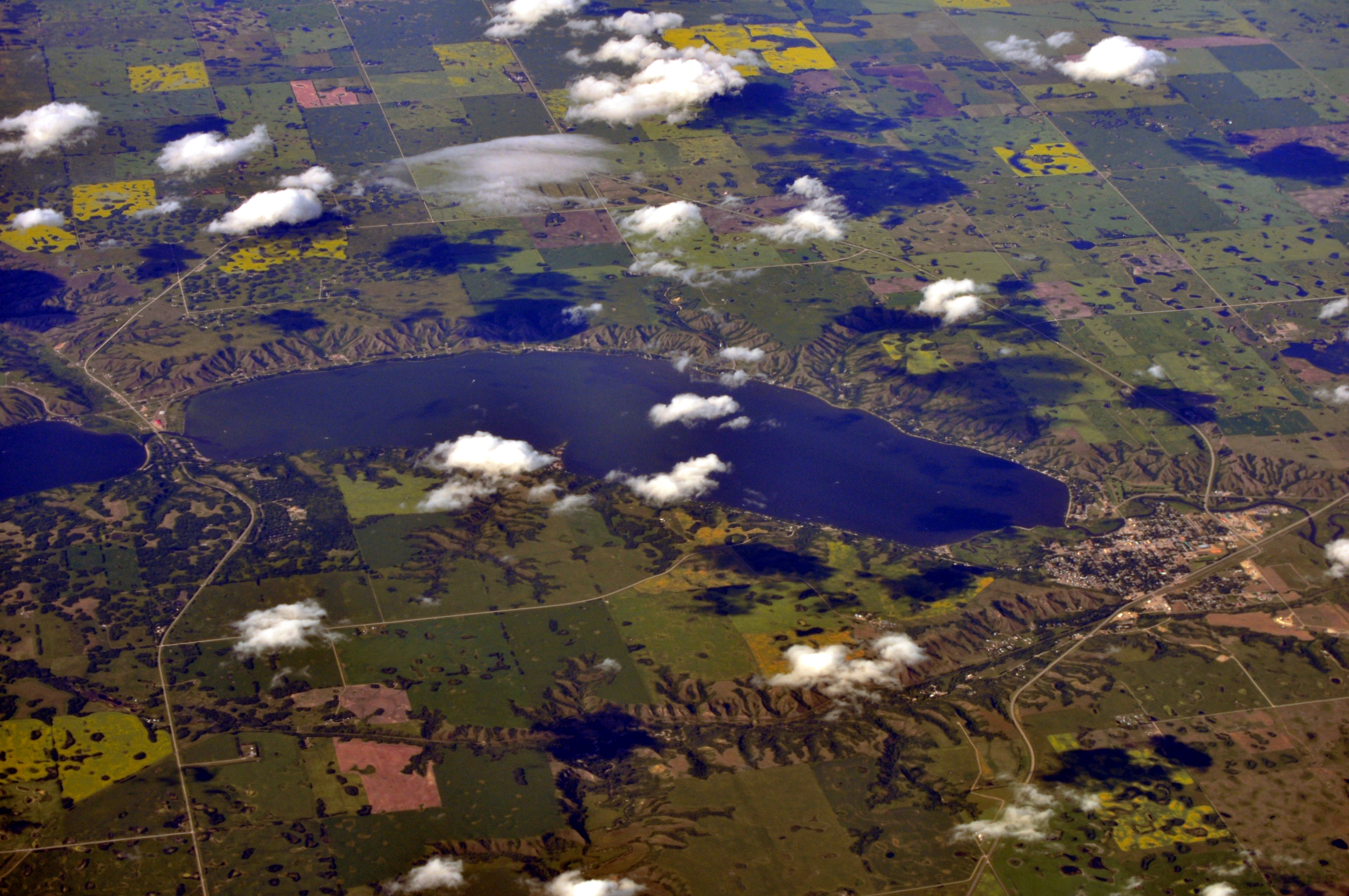
Aerial view of Echo Lake from the south. Fort Qu'Appelle is on the right and Pasqua Lake and Echo Valley Provincial Park are on the left

== See also ==
- List of lakes of Saskatchewan
- Saskatchewan Water Security Agency
- List of dams in Saskatchewan
