= Fort San =

Village in Saskatchewan, Canada

- Resort village
- Resort Village of Fort San
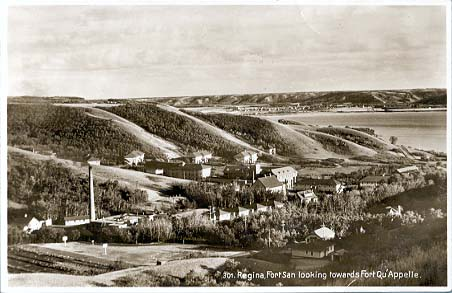
- Fort San looking towards Fort Qu'Appelle, 1920s

- Location within Saskatchewan
- Coordinates: 50.8°N 103.819°W
- Country: Canada
- Province: Saskatchewan
- Census division: 6
- Rural municipality: RM of North Qu'Appelle No. 187
- Incorporated: September 1, 1987

Government
  - Mayor: Jack Huntington
  - Governing body: Resort Village Council
  - Administrator: Amy Railton

Area (2021)
  - Land: 2.55 km^{2} (0.98 sq mi)

Population (2021)
  - Total: 233
  - Density: 91.4/km^{2} (237/sq mi)
- Time zone: CST
  - Summer (DST): CST
- Postal code: S0G 1S0
- Area codes: 306 and 639
- Highway(s): Highway 56
- Waterway(s): Echo Lake
- Website: Official website

Fort San (2016 population: 222) is a resort village in the Canadian province of Saskatchewan within Census Division No. 6. It is on the shores of Echo Lake of the Fishing Lakes in the Rural Municipality of North Qu'Appelle No. 187. It is 3 kilometres (1.9 mi) west of Fort Qu'Appelle and approximately 77 kilometres (48 mi) northeast of Regina.

Prior to becoming a resort village, Fort San was originally a sanatorium. Following the closure of the sanatorium, the area was first repurposed as a venue to house the Saskatchewan Summer School of the Arts. The resort village now houses the Echo Valley Conference Centre.

== History ==
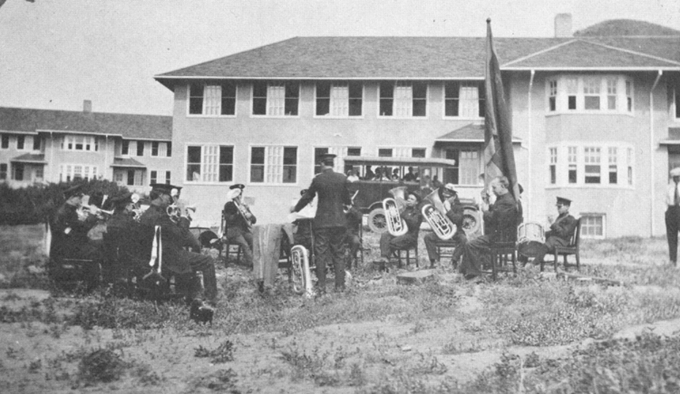
Fort San band circa 1920 by and/or for patients

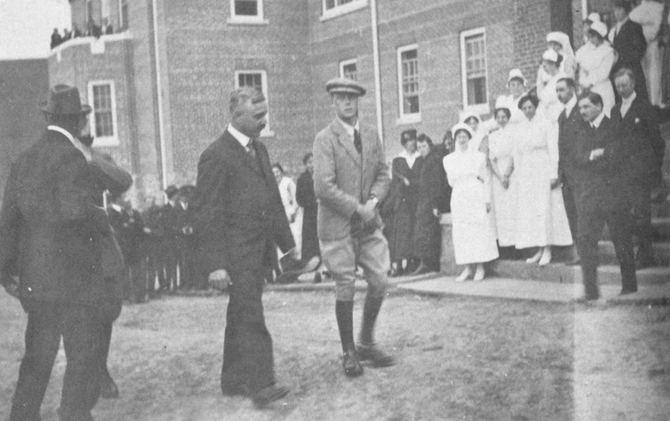
Edward Prince of Wales at Fort San during 1919 royal tour during which he acquired the Bedingfield ranch near Pekisko, Alberta

Fort San incorporated as a resort village on September 1, 1987.

Seventy years earlier, Fort San was opened as a sanatorium in 1917 during a time when tuberculosis infections were increasing. The facility was built to house 358 patients. It was a self-sufficient institution with vegetable gardens, livestock, a power house, and an extensive library for patients provided by World War I veterans.

=== Saskatchewan Summer School of the Arts ===
After tuberculosis became less of a threat in the early 1960s, the sanatorium building's purpose was changed to house the Saskatchewan Summer School of the Arts in 1967. For thirty years, thousands of young people received summer tuition in dance, music, visual art, writing, and theatre. Through the 1970s the facilities were expanded and improved to support the school over its 30 years. "Over 1,200 children and adults attended the seven-week program at the School during the summer of 1968." The school was closed in 1991 due to lack of funding. The Sage Hill Writing Experience is one of the spin-offs of the school that continued to operate using a variety of venues around the province. Existing facilities were expanded and improved throughout the 1970s as the popularity of the School increased.

=== HMCS Qu'Appelle Cadet Summer Training Centre ===
Fort San was run as a Royal Canadian Sea Cadet Camp named HMCS Qu'Appelle Cadet Summer Training Centre during the summers of the nineties to 2004. The programs offered were:

- Music
- Sailing
- General Training

One of the operating rooms was even converted to a 4 bunk barrack room and the cadets taking sailing or general training generally slept directly over the morgue.

It is an urban legend that Fort San is haunted by patients who died there in its early years. Several authors have documented different accounts of strange occurrences which transpired in the time since it was decommissioned as a sanatorium.

=== Echo Valley Conference Centre ===
The Echo Valley Conference Centre, a provincial government run conference facility is operated out of the historic building on the site. The conference centre makes use of Arts and Craft/Tudor Revival style building built from 1912 to 1922 for use by the sanitarium. On September 30, 2004 a decision was made by the Saskatchewan Property Management Corporation to shut down the Centre and offer it for sale.

== Demographics ==
Population history (1991–2021)
Year	Pop.	±%
1991	261	—
1996	265	+1.5%
2001	239	−9.8%
2006	215	−10.0%
2011	187	−13.0%
2016	222	+18.7%
2021	233	+5.0%
Source: Statistics Canada via Saskatchewan Bureau of Statistics

In the 2021 Census of Population conducted by Statistics Canada, Fort San had a population of 233 living in 120 of its 203 total private dwellings, a change of 5% from its 2016 population of 222. With a land area of 2.55 km^{2} (0.98 sq mi), it had a population density of 91.4/km^{2} (236.7/sq mi) in 2021.

In the 2016 Census of Population conducted by Statistics Canada, the Resort Village of Fort San recorded a population of 222 living in 93 of its 178 total private dwellings, a 18.7% change from its 2011 population of 187. With a land area of 2.9 km^{2} (1.1 sq mi), it had a population density of 76.6/km^{2} (198.3/sq mi) in 2016.

== Government ==
The Resort Village of Fort San is governed by an elected municipal council and an appointed administrator that meets on the third Tuesday of every month. The mayor is Jack Huntington and its administrator is Amy Railton.

== See also ==
- List of communities in Saskatchewan
- List of municipalities in Saskatchewan
- List of resort villages in Saskatchewan
- List of villages in Saskatchewan
- List of summer villages in Alberta
