= Rural Municipality of North Qu'Appelle No. 187 =

Rural municipality in Saskatchewan, Canada

North Qu'Appelle No. 187
- Rural municipality
- Rural Municipality of North Qu'Appelle No. 187
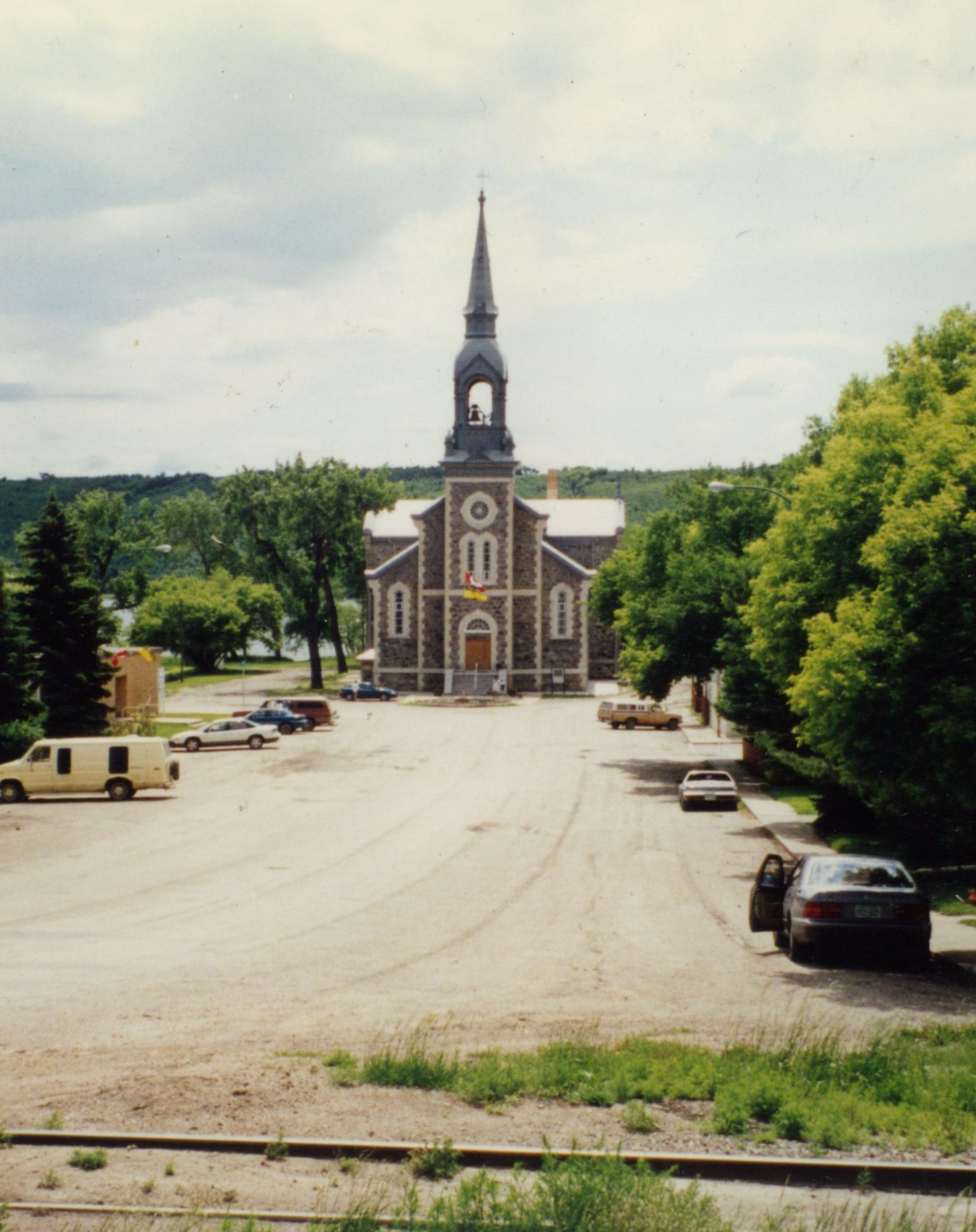
- Sacred Heart Church in Lebret

- Location of the RM of North Qu'Appelle No. 187 in Saskatchewan
- Coordinates: 50.773°N 103.869°W
- Country: Canada
- Province: Saskatchewan
- Census division: 6
- SARM division: 1
- Formed: December 12, 1910

Government
  - Reeve: Nik Whalen
  - Governing body: RM of North Qu'Appelle No. 187 Council
  - Administrator: Charmain Wowk
  - Office location: Fort Qu'Appelle

Area (2016)
  - Land: 494.98 km^{2} (191.11 sq mi)

Population (2016)
  - Total: 855
  - Density: 1.7/km^{2} (4.4/sq mi)
- Time zone: CST
  - Summer (DST): CST
- Area codes: 306 and 639

The Rural Municipality of North Qu'Appelle No. 187 (2016 population: 855) is a rural municipality (RM) in the Canadian province of Saskatchewan within Census Division No. 6 and SARM Division No. 1. It is located in the south-east portion of the province.

== History ==
The RM of North Qu'Appelle No. 187 incorporated as a rural municipality on December 12, 1910.

== Geography ==
=== Communities and localities ===
The following urban municipalities are surrounded by the RM.

Towns

- Fort Qu'Appelle

Villages

- Lebret

Resort villages

- B-Say-Tah
- Fort San
- Pasqua Lake

The following unincorporated communities are within the RM.

Organized hamlets

- Taylor Beach

Localities

- Katepwa South
- Muscow
- Lake View Beach

Several First Nations Indian reserves are adjacent to RM of North Qu'Appelle.

=== Lakes and Rivers ===
The Qu'Appelle River travels through the heart of the RM of North Qu'Appelle. Along the course of this section of the river are the four Fishing Lakes, Pasqua, Echo, Mission, and Katepwa. At the western end of the RM is a fifth lake that is sometimes referred to as one of the Fishing Lakes, Lake Muscowpetung.

== Demographics ==
Population history (1981–2016)
Year	Pop.	±%
1981	877	—
1986	956	+9.0%
1991	717	−25.0%
1996	828	+15.5%
2001	838	+1.2%
2006	852	+1.7%
2011	728	−14.6%
2016	855	+17.4%
Source: Statistics Canada via Saskatchewan Bureau of Statistics

In the 2021 Census of Population conducted by Statistics Canada, the RM of North Qu'Appelle No. 187 had a population of 918 living in 430 of its 781 total private dwellings, a change of 7.4% from its 2016 population of 855. With a land area of 489.53 km^{2} (189.01 sq mi), it had a population density of 1.9/km^{2} (4.9/sq mi) in 2021.

In the 2016 Census of Population, the RM of North Qu'Appelle No. 187 recorded a population of 855 living in 373 of its 761 total private dwellings, a 17.4% change from its 2011 population of 728. With a land area of 494.98 km^{2} (191.11 sq mi), it had a population density of 1.7/km^{2} (4.5/sq mi) in 2016.

== Parks and recreation ==
- Mission Ridge Winter Park

== Government ==
The RM of North Qu'Appelle No. 187 is governed by an elected municipal council and an appointed administrator that meets on the second and fourth Tuesday of every month. The reeve of the RM is Nik Whalen while its administrator is Charmain Wowk. The RM's office is located in Fort Qu'Appelle.

== Transportation ==
Rail

- Swan River – Preeceville – Melville – Regina Branch C.N.R – serves Melville, Colmer, Duff, Finnie, Lorlie, Gillespie, Balcarres, Hugonard, Lebret, Fort Qu'Appelle, Muscow, Edgeley, Avonhurst, Edewold, Frankslake, Zehner, Victoria Plains, Regina.

Roads

- Highway 56 – serves Lebret
- Highway 10 – serves Fort Qu'Appelle
- Highway 20
- Highway 35 – serves Fort Qu'Appelle
- Highway 22 – intersects with Saskatchewan Highway 35

== See also ==
- List of rural municipalities in Saskatchewan
