= List of people from Six Nations =

This is a list of Haudenosaunee people from Six Nations of the Grand River First Nation.

== Activists ==
- Emily General (Mohawk/Cayuga)

== Actors ==
- Gary Farmer (Cayuga)
- Graham Greene (Oneida,1952-2025)
- Cheri Maracle (Mohawk)
- Kiley May (Mohawk/Cayuga)
- Jay Silverheels (Mohawk, 1912–1980)

== Athletes ==
- Beverly "Bev" Beaver
- Cory Bomberry
- Clay Hill
- Cody Jamieson
- Stan Jonathan (Mohawk, born 1955), NHL hockey player
- Nathan Lickers
- Tom Longboat
- Henry Maracle
- Brandon Montour
- Ken Montour
- Tehoka Nanticoke
- Craig Point
- Delby Powless
- Gaylord Powless
- Johnny Powless
- Ross Powless
- Sid Smith

== Artists ==
- January Rogers (Tuscarora/Mohawk), poet, artist, and publisher

== Civil servants ==
- Julia Jamieson
- Roberta Jamieson
- Oliver Milton Martin
- Gilbert Monture

== Language advocates ==
- Nikonha, last full-blooded Tutelo speaker, died 1871 aged 106

== Musicians ==
- Derek Miller (Mohawk, born 1964), singer-songwriter
- Robbie Robertson (Cayuga/Mohawk), singer-songwriter, member of The Band
- Logan Staats
- A Tribe Called Red

== Politicians ==
- Joseph Brant (Mohawk, 1743–1807), leader, British officer, brother of Molly Brant
- Molly Brant (Mohawk, c. 1736–1796), leader, sister of Joseph Brant
- Deskaheh
- Roberta Jamieson
- George Henry Martin Johnson
- John Smoke Johnson

== Scholars and educators ==
- Albert Anthony
- Cody Groat
- Falen Johnson
- Dawn Martin-Hill (Mohawk, born 1962), anthropologist and professor
- Oronhyatekha (Mohawk, 1841–1907), physician, scholar

== Scientists ==
- Arnold Anderson

== Writers ==
- Alicia Elliott
- E. Pauline Johnson, Tekahionwake (Mohawk, 1861–1913), poet, author, public speaker
- Patricia Monture-Angus (Mohawk, 1958–2010), lawyer, activist, educator, and author
- Daniel David Moses
- January Rogers (Tuscarora/Mohawk), poet, artist, and publisher
