= Reginald Underwood =

Reginald ("Reg") Underwood, member of the Tsawout First Nation, near Victoria, British Columbia, made his name known as an elite athlete competing in softball as an outfielder for the Victoria Bate team from 1974 to 1984. During that time, he helped the team to a string of successes at the senior "A" men's level, winning 10 Provincial Championships, 6 National Championships, and the 1979 Pan Am Games. The team was also named Co-World Champions at the 1976 World Championships in Wellington, New Zealand, where twelve nations competed, but bad weather forced the cancellation of the tournament before it could be completed. The title was shared between the semi-finalists: Canada, New Zealand, and USA. The Victoria Bate team was unique because it was the only club team to ever win the World Championships; all of the others had been All-Star teams. 1976 was the last year in which a club team would be represented at the World championships. In 1990, the team that Reginald played on between the years 1975-1976, was inducted into the BC Sports Hall of Fame.

Reginald was also recognize for his achievements as individual. He was named an All-Star at the 1976, 1981, and 1982, and 1983 National Championships, while competing for the Victoria Bate team, where he finished with a career batting average over 300. In his spare time, Reginald would also help adolescent players enhance their skills to improve their game. He was named a national Tom Longboat Award recipient in 1976 because of his accomplishments in softball, but also for his achievements in basketball, track and field, bowling, and rugby. Reginald was very talented in his game of softball, as it went beyond a few championships. He led his team to 2 senior B Provincials, 2 Master Provincials and 3 Western Canadian Master Championships. His sister, Vivian Underwood, won the regional Tom Longboat Award in 1964.

He competed in softball long after his days with the Victoria Bate team ended. Softball BC named him Athlete of the Year in 1998 and 2003.

Other forms of recognition include his induction into the Softball BC Hall of Fame in 1993, the Greater Victoria Sports Hall of Fame in 1996, and the Softball Canada Hall of Fame in 1998, where two other Tom Longboat Award recipients are recognized for their achievements: Darren Zack and Phyllis Bomberry, both inducted in 2009.
