= Beverly Beaver =

Beverly Beaver may refer to:

- Bev Beaver (athlete) (born 1947), Mohawk Canadian athlete
- Beverly Barton (1946–2011), American author born Beverly Marie Beaver
