= 1986 World Junior Championships in Athletics – Men's 800 metres =

The men's 800 metres event at the 1986 World Junior Championships in Athletics was held in Athens, Greece, at Olympic Stadium on 16, 17 and 18 July.

== Medalists ==
Gold	David Sharpe; United Kingdom
Silver	Manuel Balmaceda; Chile
Bronze	Andriy Sudnik; Soviet Union

== Results ==
=== Final ===
18 July

Rank	Name	Nationality	Time	Notes
1st place, gold medalist(s)	David Sharpe	United Kingdom	1:48.32	
2nd place, silver medalist(s)	Manuel Balmaceda	Chile	1:48.91	
3rd place, bronze medalist(s)	Andriy Sudnik	Soviet Union	1:48.93	
4	Predrag Melnjak	Yugoslavia	1:49.54	
5	Paul Williams	United Kingdom	1:49.78	
6	Sergey Timofeyev	Soviet Union	1:49.92	
7	Geoffrey Seurey	Kenya	1:50.28	
8	George Kersh	United States	1:50.41	

=== Semifinals ===
17 July

==== Semifinal 1 ====
Rank	Name	Nationality	Time	Notes
1	Andriy Sudnik	Soviet Union	1:50.31	Q
2	David Sharpe	United Kingdom	1:50.38	Q
3	John Ndhlovu	Zimbabwe	1:50.60	
4	Richard Brant	Canada	1:50.67	
5	Keiichiro Nakamura	Japan	1:50.81	
6	Anders Persson	Sweden	1:51.67	
7	Tadelle Abebe	Ethiopia	1:52.38	
8	Bouazza Noualla	Algeria	1:52.42	

==== Semifinal 2 ====
Rank	Name	Nationality	Time	Notes
1	Predrag Melnjak	Yugoslavia	1:48.25	Q
2	Geoffrey Seurey	Kenya	1:48.71	Q
3	Sergey Timofeyev	Soviet Union	1:48.95	q
4	George Kersh	United States	1:49.02	q
5	Alexander Adam	West Germany	1:49.88	
6	Samir Benfarès	France	1:50.76	
7	Momouni Apiou	Côte d'Ivoire	1:53.59	
8	Cameron Orr	Australia	1:56.04	

==== Semifinal 3 ====
Rank	Name	Nationality	Time	Notes
1	Manuel Balmaceda	Chile	1:49.75	Q
2	Paul Williams	United Kingdom	1:50.03	Q
3	Anthony Christie	Jamaica	1:50.05	
4	Marek Szymkowicz	Poland	1:50.27	
5	David Moore	United States	1:50.66	
6	Miroslav Chochkov	Bulgaria	1:50.87	
7	Bernd Müller	West Germany	1:51.94	
8	Joseph Meli Kiprobon	Kenya	1:52.02	

=== Heats ===
16 July

==== Heat 1 ====
Rank	Name	Nationality	Time	Notes
1	David Moore	United States	1:49.82	Q
2	Cameron Orr	Australia	1:50.81	Q
3	Anders Persson	Sweden	1:51.04	Q
4	Momouni Apiou	Côte d'Ivoire	1:51.27	q
5	Philippos Tandis	Greece	1:52.39	
6	Omar Ibrahim	Egypt	1:53.07	
7	Eduardo Cabrera	Mexico	1:55.05	
8	Momodou Bello N'Jie	Gambia	1:55.24	

==== Heat 2 ====
Rank	Name	Nationality	Time	Notes
1	Andriy Sudnik	Soviet Union	1:50.54	Q
2	Keiichiro Nakamura	Japan	1:50.57	Q
3	Paul Williams	United Kingdom	1:50.83	Q
4	Alexander Adam	West Germany	1:51.46	q
5	Riccardo Cardone	Italy	1:51.57	
6	Honest Umbe	Tanzania	1:51.60	
7	Guillermo Ghersi	Peru	1:56.32	
8	Mahamat Nour Amdaye	Chad	1:56.90	
9	Sergio Iván Gómez	Guatemala	1:59.01	

==== Heat 3 ====
Rank	Name	Nationality	Time	Notes
1	David Sharpe	United Kingdom	1:51.49	Q
2	Manuel Balmaceda	Chile	1:51.51	Q
3	Richard Brant	Canada	1:51.56	Q
4	Ado Maude	Nigeria	1:51.69	
5	Peter Hepworth	Australia	1:52.75	
6	Hossain Milzer	Bangladesh	1:54.81	
7	Lucien Simon	Antigua and Barbuda	1:54.92	
8	Alan Bunce	New Zealand	1:54.92	

==== Heat 4 ====
Rank	Name	Nationality	Time	Notes
1	John Ndhlovu	Zimbabwe	1:49.53	Q
2	Predrag Melnjak	Yugoslavia	1:49.86	Q
3	Marek Szymkowicz	Poland	1:50.09	Q
4	Joseph Meli Kiprobon	Kenya	1:50.58	q
5	Santiago Gutiérrez	Spain	1:53.37	
6	Ricardo Morrison	Panama	1:53.99	
7	Moses Phiri	Zambia	1:54.49	
8	Mansour Al-Balushi	Oman	1:56.17	

==== Heat 5 ====
Rank	Name	Nationality	Time	Notes
1	George Kersh	United States	1:51.66	Q
2	Sergey Timofeyev	Soviet Union	1:51.72	Q
3	Bernd Müller	West Germany	1:51.82	Q
4	António de Oliveira	Brazil	1:51.96	
5	Brahim El-Ghazali	Morocco	1:52.56	
6	Mitoshi Wada	Japan	1:53.61	
7	Patrick Haas	Austria	1:54.66	
8	Ingemar Sluis	Netherlands Antilles	1:57.26	
9	Bernard Henry	Saint Lucia	2:00.22	

==== Heat 6 ====
Rank	Name	Nationality	Time	Notes
1	Geoffrey Seurey	Kenya	1:50.13	Q
2	Samir Benfarès	France	1:50.79	Q
3	Bouazza Noualla	Algeria	1:51.13	Q
4	Howard Jackson	Canada	1:51.51	
5	Joseph Sean	Trinidad and Tobago	1:52.78	
6	Saravanan Arjunan	Singapore	1:59.05	

==== Heat 7 ====
Rank	Name	Nationality	Time	Notes
1	Anthony Christie	Jamaica	1:51.22	Q
2	Miroslav Chochkov	Bulgaria	1:51.61	Q
3	Tadelle Abebe	Ethiopia	1:52.26	Q
4	Fabio Di Vito	Italy	1:52.85	
5	Steinn Jóhannsson	Iceland	1:56.72	

== Participation ==
According to an unofficial count, 53 athletes from 44 countries participated in the event.

- Algeria (1)
- Antigua and Barbuda (1)
- Australia (2)
- Austria (1)
- Bangladesh (1)
- Brazil (1)
- Bulgaria (1)
- Canada (2)
- Chad (1)
- Chile (1)
- Côte d'Ivoire (1)
- Egypt (1)
- Ethiopia (1)
- France (1)
- Gambia (1)
- Greece (1)
- Guatemala (1)
- Iceland (1)
- Italy (2)
- Jamaica (1)
- Japan (2)
- Kenya (2)
- Mexico (1)
- Morocco (1)
- Netherlands Antilles (1)
- New Zealand (1)
- Nigeria (1)
- Oman (1)
- Panama (1)
- Peru (1)
- Poland (1)
- Saint Lucia (1)
- Singapore (1)
- Soviet Union (2)
- Spain (1)
- Sweden (1)
- Tanzania (1)
- Trinidad and Tobago (1)
- United Kingdom (2)
- United States (2)
- West Germany (2)
- Yugoslavia (1)
- Zambia (1)
- Zimbabwe (1)
