= Polchies =

Polchies is a surname. Notable people with the surname include:

- Amanda Polchies (fl. 2013), Lakota Sioux / Mikmaq activist
- Carole Polchies (fl. 1957–1999), Canadian first nations sportsperson
