= Lyric Atchison =

Canadian sportswoman

Lyric Atchison is from North Vancouver, British Columbia and is a part of the Squamish Nation. Atchison was always a multi-sport athlete; she played soccer, wrestling and later on participated in rugby in 2012 at the age of 13.

== Rugby background ==
Lyric Atchison is a First Nation rugby athlete. Atchison was captain at Carson Graham high school and led her team to two championships, 2016 and 2017. Once graduating from Carson Graham high school, she continued her studies at the University of British Columbia with an undergrad in Kinesiology (UBC). As an athlete, there are five years of eligibility playing at the varsity level. The rugby team at the University of British Columbia is the Thunderbirds. Once Atchison started playing rugby her position is known as a Back Row, Rugby union positions. The Squamish First Nation member is a national level youth wrestler and rugby player. Atchison won the Premier's Award for Aboriginal Youth Excellence in Sport for the Vancouver Coastal region, as a grade 12 student at Carson Graham. Canada's Women's U20 head coach has set the roster for the team traveling to England to compete in the Tri-Nations Cup for July 2018 – 2019 and Atchison was announced as one of the players.

== Tom Longboat Award ==
The Tom Longboat Award was established in 1951 and is given to Aboriginal athletes to recognize their outstanding contributions to sport in Canada. Moreover, the British Columbia player was honored of being the 2019 winner of the Tom Longboat Award, recognized as the female Aboriginal athlete of the entire year. The Aboriginal Sport Circle picks the following Aboriginal athlete who receives the honour of being a Tom Longboat winner. Lyric Atchison is a First Nation athlete from the Squamish Nation and has impacted the rugby world at a young age playing for Carson Graham Eagles and then joining UBC Thunderbirds. Atchison features in BC Provincial Age-Grade XVs teams and part of the undefeated BC U18 Tour of Ireland in 2017.

== Awards ==
- Premier's Award for Aboriginal Youth Excellence in Sports on March 21, 2017
- Tom Longboat Award in 2019
