= Rick Brant (athlete) =

Mohawk track and field athlete

Rick Brant (born September 27, 1967) is a Mohawk athlete who primarily competed in track and field (middle distance). Brant is a Tom Longboat winner, winning the National award in 1987. He is originally from Ontario and a member of the Mohawks of the Bay of Quinte First Nation He now resides in Cowichan, British Columbia. Brant is most recently known for his contribution in being a founding member of the Aboriginal Sports Circle, Executive Director of the Indigenous Sport Physical Activity and Recreation Council (I·SPARC) and CEO of three separate North American Indigenous Games (NAIG) - 1993, 1997 and 2008. Brant served as President of the North American Indigenous Games Council (the international governing body for the NAIG) from 2015 to 2018. He continues to serve on the Council's Executive Committee as Past President.

== Athletic career ==
Brant was a part of Canada's National Track and Field and Cross Country teams. He was a National Champion at 800 meters, 4x400 meter relay and team cross country. In 1984, Brant won the "Most Improved Athlete" while he was a member of the Ottawa Lions Track and Field Club. In 1986, Brant was a part of the University of Ottawa's Cross Country team that participated in the OUA and CIS championships. In 2008, Brant's former high school in Ottawa, Brookfield, inducted him into the wall of fame for his track and field and cross country career. Brant also received the Tom Longboat Award in 1987 for the Most Outstanding Aboriginal Athlete in Canada. Brant's notable athletic accomplishments include:

- 1986–1988 Carded athlete and member of Canada’s National Track and Field Team
- 1988 Saskatchewan Indoor Track and Field Athlete of the Year
- 1987–1988 Provincial 800 meter Champion for the Provinces of Saskatchewan, British Columbia, and Manitoba
- 1987 CIAU All Canadian – University Indoor Track and Field Championships 4x400 metre relay Champions
- 1987 Tom Longboat Award - Most Outstanding Canadian Aboriginal Athlete
- 1987 Espoir Champion - 800 metre - Canada vs. Wales and Ireland
- 1987 Canadian Challenge Final Champion - 800 meters and Canadian Challenge Final and Most Outstanding Male Athlete
- 1986 CIAU All Canadian – University Team Cross Country Championship
- 1986 National Achievement Award - Ontario Amateur Sport
- 1986 World Junior Championships - 800 meters Semi Finals
- 1986 National Junior Champion - 800 meters and 4x400 meter relay

== Contribution to sport ==
Brant has contributed significantly to Canada's Aboriginal sports system. He is a founding member of the Aboriginal Sports Circle - Canada's National Voice for Aboriginal sport, recreation and physical activity. He served as the Aboriginal Sport Circle's Executive Director from 1998 to 2005. During his time with the Aboriginal Sport Circle he helped lead the revitalization of the Tom Longboat Awards, creation of the National Aboriginal Coaching Awards, creation of the Aboriginal Coaching Modules, and the creation of the National Aboriginal Hockey Championships. Brant has also been closely connected with the North American Indigenous Games movement. He helped found the North American Indigenous Games Council, the international governing body for the North American Indigenous Games, and he has oversaw the delivery of three separate NAIG's - Prince Albert, SK 1993, Victoria, BC 1997, and Cowichan Valley, BC 2008. Most recently, Brant helped establish the Indigenous Sport Physical Activity and Recreation Council (I·SPARC) of British Columbia and the creation of the Aboriginal Sport, Recreation and Physical Activity Strategy (BC), the first comprehensive/long term strategy of its kind in North America. Brant is the Executive Director of I·SPARC, which is the official Provincial Aboriginal Sport Body for the Province of British Columbia. In 2008 Brant served as the CEO of the Cowichan 2008 North American Indigenous Games. During his time as CEO of Cowichan he had a part in the Legacy Plan (2008) which included; multi-year senior staffing, marketing plan to recognize contribution, funds development strategy, transfer of knowledge oversight plan and use and protection funds policy.
