= Beverly Stanger =

Canadian runner

Beverly Stanger was a blind Canadian Indigenous track and field athlete from the Timiskaming Band of Notre Dame du Nord, Quebec. She competed at the 1976 Toronto Olympics for the Physically Disabled, and the 1977 Ontario Summer games held in Brantford, Ontario. Stanger was a recipient of the prestigious Tom Longboat Award in 1976, only the second female to have done so and the first disabled athlete.

== Early life ==
Stanger was of Abenaki Algonquin descent, originally from the Timiskaming Band of Notre Dame du Nord, Quebec. Later in her life, she resided in Schumacher, Ontario. She attended the W. Ross Macdonald School for the Blind in 1977, where she competed in track and field events.

== Athletic achievements ==
Stanger competed in the 1976 Toronto Olympics for the Physically Disabled. She won a gold in the high jump, followed by two silver medals in the discus throw and the pentathlon. The following year in 1977 she participated in the Ontario Summer games held in Brantford, Ontario. Competing in various track and field events, she won another gold and an additional four silver medals.

== Awards ==
Stanger was awarded the national Tom Longboat Award in 1976 alongside Reginald Underwood. She was the second female winner of national award.
