= Qu'Appelle Indian Residential School =

Canadian Indian residential school in Saskatchewan

Coordinates: 50°45′32.9″N 103°42′40.26″W

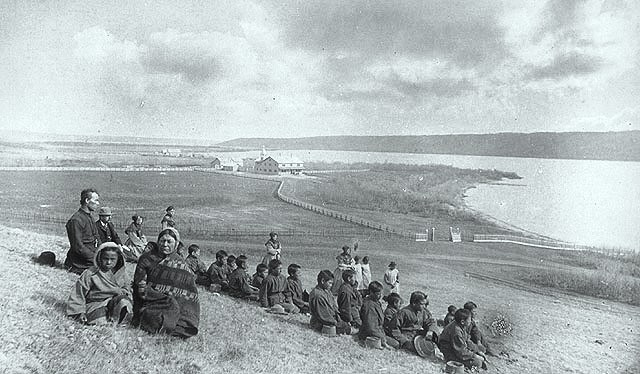
Students and family members, Father Joseph Hugonard (principal), staff and Grey Nuns on a hill overlooking the Qu'Appelle Industrial School, May 1885

Qu'Appelle Indian Residential School (Q.I.R.S.) or Qu'Appelle Industrial School was a Canadian residential school in the Qu'Appelle Valley, Saskatchewan, also called the Lebret Residential School. As one of the early residential schools in western Canada, it was operated from 1884 to 1969 by the Roman Catholic Church for First Nations children and was run by the Missionary Oblates of Mary Immaculate and the Grey Nuns.

The education of the students was insisted upon by the Chiefs before signing treaties. Churches were already supplying some education to the Indigenous population and a common Western value was that "All true civilization must be based on moral law, which Christian religion alone can give." Further, partnering with churches helped the government keep costs low as personnel worked inexpensively as "missionaries." At this location, children had visitations with Chiefs and families, as requested, and all students went home for the summers.

As of November 8, 2021 Star Blanket Cree Nation started searching for unmarked graves using ground-penetrating radar. and they have located none as all burials were done in the community cemetery which included all members indigenous and white, etc. and are recorded in the burial records.

It was located on what is now the Wa-Pii Moos-toosis (White Calf) Indian Reserve of the Star Blanket Cree Nation adjoining the village of Lebret. Lebret is situated on the north-east shore of Mission Lake in the Qu'Appelle Valley, six kilometres east of Fort Qu'Appelle on Highway 56.

== Lack of information ==
The Truth and Reconciliation Commission's 94 Calls to Action are dependent on identifying and making publicly available the history and legacy of residential schools and the history of Indigenous Peoples in Canada. All information about the schools are in the Canadian Archives including all supplies, students, care provided and classes taught, etc. The history of this particular residential school has been written by teachers and students and available in public domain. Plus digitization efforts to date have not prioritized items under copyright nor non-mainstream cultures and languages, resulting in claims of digital or electronic colonialism. Thus there is a lack of mainstream culture references for this entry, plus last century and early 20th century Indigenous references for a school that celebrated a Centenary in 1984.

== History ==
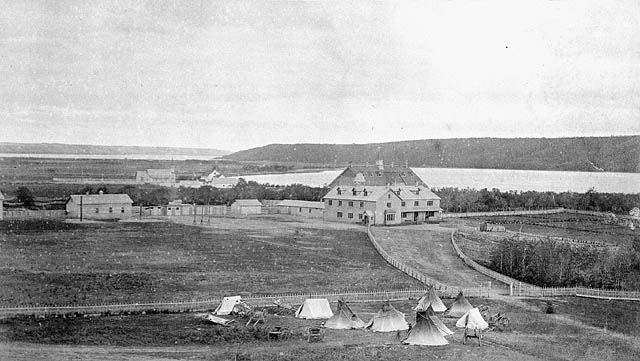
Qu'Appelle Industrial School in 1885. Parents camped outside the gate in order to visit their children. Destroyed by fire in 1904.

=== Qu'Appelle Indian Residential School ===
Qu'Appelle Industrial School was built in 1884 to fulfill one of the conditions of Treaty 4, signed in 1874, which was to provide schools and education for First Nations children. It was located in the Qu'Appelle Valley. Fifteen students were enrolled in the first year with Father Joseph Hugonnard as the first principal. (It was a boys only school until 1887 when girls accommodation were built. See Laviolette in references below) In 1886 there were 86 students and by 1914 there were 280 students.

"With the assistance of the Grey Nuns, a few Oblate fathers, and lay instructors, Hugonard was to make Qu’Appelle Industrial School a model Catholic educational facility for native people and the largest such institution in Canada. The native children, in parallel boys’ and girls’ schools, attended classes for half the day and engaged in domestic or agricultural pursuits the other half. English was the language of instruction; the girls played croquet and the boys cricket."

—

The first building was destroyed by fire in 1904 and the second Qu'Appelle Industrial School was destroyed by fire in 1932. It was replaced in 1935. The school was expanded with additions and a gymnasium (1894) and in 1948 high school classes started to be held onsite. A bronze statue of Joseph Hugonard (sic) by Toronto sculptor Charles Duncan McKechnie was installed in 1926. Located near the entrance of the school, the base of the statue appears in graduation photos.

=== St. Paul's High School and White Calf Collegiate ===
In 1951, St. Paul's High School was added to the complex. In 1952, an 800-seat auditorium was erected. The decision was made in 1965 to close education above grade 9 and the high school ended up closing in 1969 because there were local integrated schools available to attend.

The school reopened under the operations of the reserve in 1973 under the name White Calf Collegiate, in charge of the residences but not education. Grade 10 was added in 1977 at the expense of losing grade 1, then Grade 11 was added in 1978 and in 1981 the Board became the School Council and took over the school. Grade 12 was added, with the first graduating class May 21, 1982. The school finally closed in August 1998. White Calf Collegiate, operated by the Star Blanket Cree Nation, was demolished in 1999.

Sister G. Marcoux wrote a history of the school in 1955, on the occasion of the Golden Jubilee of the province of Saskatchewan and an article of its history on its centenary was published.

=== Principals (Q.I.R.S.) ===
- Father Joseph Hugonnard (sic), OMI (1884-1917) Appointed by Prime Minister John A. MacDonald.
- Frs. Pierre LeCoq, P. Magnan, A. Dugas and W. Vezinba (1917-1919) served as interim Principals.
- Fr. Joseph Leonard, OMI (1919-1936)
- Fr. de Bretagne (1936–43)
- Fr. Piche (1943-1951)
- Fr. Omer Robidoux, OMI (1951–58)
- Fr. Victor Bilodeau (1958–64)
- Fr. Leonard Charron, OMI (1964-x) (While he was on leave doing a Master's degree, from September 1968 - September 1969, Fr. Julien Morin, OMI, was Acting Principal.)

== Education and extra-curricular activities ==
"The program of studies was oriented towards christianity (sic) and the pupils enjoyed manual work/life skills, art, singing and music and various sporting activities." The students spent half their time on vocational training and half academic with housekeeping and farm chores required in teaching life skills. The curriculum included "reading, writing, arithmetic, spelling, geography, history, music, singing and drawing." For the boys the emphasis was on "animal husbandry and farm related subjects, with additional training in tailoring, shoemaking, printing and painting." The girls were taught "homemaking skills such as spinning, weaving, baking, cooking and sewing."

Fr. de Bretagne "re-organized the school program, the farm operations, the manual training facilities" and "obtained funds to permit the creation of a 24-piece military band which won many prizes in provincial festivals."

Fr. Piche organized the Cadet Corps in 1944.

It is noted that the school had a gestetner and may have had a printing press earlier in its history.

=== Sports and awards ===
The Lebret Indians Junior "B" Hockey Team dominated the province for five years, from 1955-59. When Indian Affairs phased out grades 11-12 in 1959, Arthur Obey, the Coach of the hockey team at the school, reported it wiped out Junior "B" hockey at Lebret and the league ended up folding. Zeman et al. state Junior "B" hockey didn't return until 1962. Sports were very important method of assimilation at the residential schools and Lebret, for one, "developed outstanding athletic programs" and athletes. Sports and games were also by students to endure their institutionalization. Art Obey spent "15 years [as] Director of Recreation and Sports at the Lebret Indian residential School, Sask." starting in 1950 through the time of Lebret's successful sports program. He returned at some point as it is noted he "remained involved with sports at Qu'Appelle into the 1970s, when he served as the Qu'Appelle residence's recreation director."

Hockey teams (boys) at Lebret have won:

- Qu'Appelle Valley Intermediate Hockey League, First Place aka Q.V.H.A Champions, 1952. See photo of winning team in the November 1952 issue of The Indian Missionary Record.
- Junior "B" Atholl Murray Trophy as Junior "B" Champions in 1954-55 (entered Saskatchewan Amateur Hockey Association for first time), and 1955–56, 1956–57, 1957–58, 1958-59. See photo of 1955(?) team on page 42 of Sister Marcoux, and 1955-56 team in photo with Juvenile "B" team on page 241 of Zeman et al.
- Juvenile "B" Shield as Juvenile "B" Champions in 1956 (but not according to the records of the Saskatchewan Hockey Association), 1957 (see team in photo on page 242 of Zemick et al), 1958-1959 and, 1960. See photo of 1959 Juvenile "B" Team and coaches in the April 1960 Indian Record. A photo of the St. Paul's High, Lebret, Saskatchewan 1958 Saskatchewan Junior 'B'/Juvenile 'B' Provincial Champions complete with players names may be found in the September 1982 Saskatchewan Indian.
- Juvenile "C" Al Pickard Trophy as Juvenile "C" Champions and Midget "C" Ken Price Trophy as Midget "C" Champions in 1958.
- High School Mainline Hockey League Champions, 1959.

The boys track and field team "dominated many local meets from 1955 to 1960.

Further:

- A photo of the Lebret baseball team is available, originally published in the Prairie Messenger, and reprinted in The Indian Missionary Record in 1953. The article notes the following people and positions: Gerald Starr, R.F., Art Obey, P., Herbie Strongeagle, Ss, and Clive Linklater, C.
- Saskatchewan High School Athletic Association, "B" Basketball, 1959.
- "In the fall of 1959, the 'Lebret Indians' Football Team' won the Mainline League Trophy for the second year in succession. In this league they competed against boys of their own age-group from the non-Indian population of neighbouring towns."
- St. Mary's Meteors (Lebret Indian School's senior basketball team - "girls"): Yorkton Collegiate Trophy (1957–58, 1959–60); Weyburn's Western Christian College Trophy (1958–59); won the Saskatchewan provincial championship (1958–59). Includes photo of the team.

Graduates:

- The Fort Qu'Appelle Sioux Indian hockey team, mostly Lebret graduates with Obey as coach and player, won the Intermediate "C" Champions in 1956-57. 1958 Saskatchewan "C" Championship.

== Students and alumni ==
Photos of some students, teachers, the school and their activities may be in copies of the Indian Record and Indian Missionary Record at the Engracia De Jesus Matias Archives and Special Collections at Algoma University, through the Centre de Patrimoine, in Sister Marcoux's history, the Library and Archives Canada's Residential Schools: Photographic Collections - Saskatchewan, and at the University of Saskatchewan's University Archives and Special Collections' where four restricted access photo albums currently reside.

Four Saskatchewan students of the Lebret Indian school have won the Tom Longboat Award, an award that honours outstanding First Nations athletes and sportsmen in each province. National male and female winners are selected from the provincial winners.

- Arthur Obey: In 1951, the Regional (R) award at age 20 for Baseball and Hockey and in 1960 the National (N) award at age 29 for Hockey and Baseball. From the Piapot Reserve.
- Herbert Strongeagle (sometimes inaccurately spelled Strong Eagle): In 1953, the Regional (R) award at age 19 for Track and field, Hockey, Baseball, and Basketball. From the Pasqua Reserve. A c/Corp rank as Cadet Officer while at Lebret in 1953.
- Gerald Starr: In 1954, the Regional (R) award at age 17 for Track and field, Hockey, Baseball, and Basketball. From the Starblanket Band. He was a residential school survivor who died while waiting for his hearing (before the Truth and Reconciliation Commission).
- George Poitras: In 1957, the National (N) award for Hockey, Baseball, Rugby, and Basketball. From the File Hills Reserve. In 1999, he filed a lawsuit regarding his abuse and received reparation. A George Poitras is recorded as being a member of the 13-member Qu'Appelle Indian Residential Council running the "first Indian-operated student residence of its kind in the province of Saskatchewan" at the newly named White Calf Collegiate.

Other students included:

- Glen Anaquod who recounts his experiences in We Were Children.
- Joe Buffalo, actor and skateboarder
- Harold Greyeyes, Saskatchewan Agricultural Hall of Fame, 1992.
- Fred Kelly, member of Assembly of First Nations team that negotiated the historic Indian Residential Schools Settlement Agreement, served as chief of his own community, grand chief of the Anishinaabe Nation in Treaty Number Three, and Ontario regional director of Indian and Northern Affairs Canada.
- Clive Linklater, Federation of Saskatchewan Indians, Saskatchewan Indian Education Commission (SIEC) (exact dates unknown) A Cadet Officer while at Lebret: C/Sgt.-Major in 1953.
- Noel Starblanket
- Joe Williams: Chief (5 years) and Councillor (20 years) of the Sakimay Band, "Executive member of the Union of Saskatchewan Indians and of the Queen Victoria Protectorate," Board member of "Marieval Community Educational Centre, Last Oak Park Corporation and Qu’Appelle Indian Development Authority," studied as a Brother at Lebret Oblate's Seminary.

In November, 2021 the Star Blanket Cree Nation began searching using ground-penetrating radar, for students who did not survive their stay at the school. The search could take up to 3 years.

== See also ==
- List of residential schools in Canada
