= Sault Ste. Marie Walk of Fame =

Coordinates: 46.51395°N 84.33632°W

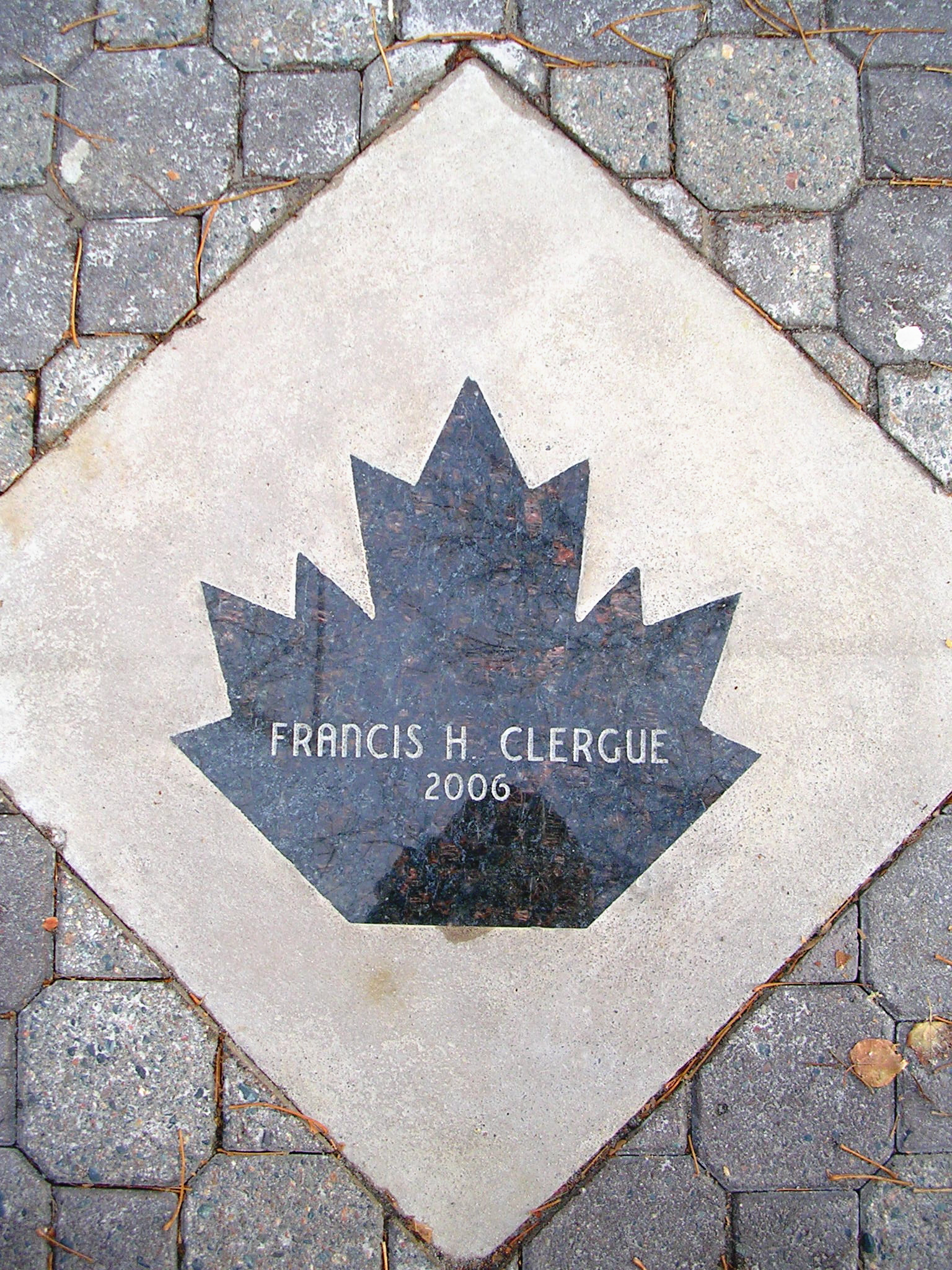
The Sault Ste. Marie Walk of Fame marker for Francis H. Clergue as it appeared embedded within the Queen Street sidewalk in 2006

The Sault Ste. Marie Walk of Fame is a series of markers located throughout downtown Sault Ste. Marie, Ontario, Canada. The Walk of Fame is a joint project between the city of Sault Ste. Marie and its Downtown Association, and honours those from the city or the Algoma District who have made outstanding contributions to the community or have made significant achievements in their chosen field(s) of work. Inductees are added on an annual basis.

== History ==
The genesis of the Walk of Fame was City By-Law 2002–193, passed by the Sault Ste. Marie City Council on September 9, 2002. The by-law established a "Walk of Fame Program," to be operated by the city and the Downtown Association with the intent of honouring Sault Ste. Marie natives who have made significant contributions and outstanding achievements. By extension, the Walk was viewed as a means of enhancing tourism in the city and attracting patrons to the Downtown shopping and business district.

The by-law established a committee to select annual inductees and, at the outset, determine a suitable location for the Walk. The 8 committee members are appointed by the City Council for a 3-year term, and include the mayor, two city councilors, two representatives of the Downtown Association, two citizens at large, and one Chamber of Commerce representative.

Prospective names for the first set of Walk of Fame inductees were submitted by the general public to the city clerk's office in 2003. From that pool of nominees, the Walk of Fame Committee selected an inaugural list of 10 inductees. Those selections were then tabled until a suitable time and place to launch the Walk of Fame was determined. The Walk of Fame was formally unveiled on September 30, 2006, with its first 10 honorees celebrated as part of the grand opening weekend of the Steelback Centre sports arena (the arena would be rechristened Essar Centre in 2008 and GFL Memorial Gardens in 2018).

From its 2006 unveiling until the mid-2010s, the Walk of Fame markers were embedded in the south sidewalk of Queen Street, north of the Essar Centre and adjacent Memorial Square. By the mid-2010s, however, wear and tear caused by winter weather, snow removal, and other maintenance vehicles caused many of the stone-and-granite markers to become crumbled or otherwise severely damaged. In August 2015, as part of a broader repair plan for Queen Street's sidewalks, the City Council voted to remove the markers from the sidewalk and place them in storage.

With the Walk of Fame's markers removed and its nomination process paused, the City Council spent 2016 and 2017 reviewing new options for the Walk, including replacing the stones with vinyl graphics, illuminated pillars, or aluminum markers on the Essar Centre facade. By Spring 2017, another display concept was considered, one that would place new and existing markers in upright, see-through display cases located throughout downtown. The concept would help preserve the condition of the marble markers, reduce replacement costs for the original stones (5 of those 38 markers were damaged beyond repair), provide year-round access and visibility, and allow for simple display expansion and signage when necessary. This plan would eventually be approved by Council, and the restoration project's results were revealed to the public (with the assistance of original Walk inductee Roberta Bondar) on December 7, 2017.

In late 2021, the Walk of Fame was the subject of review by a city task force. Concerns about the Walk at that time reportedly included the annual frequency of its induction process and whether it created redundancies with other civic awards offered by the City of Sault Ste. Marie. Though no changes to the Walk project were known to have been made, the Sault Downtown Association recommended in a June 2022 meeting to continue the program, though Association members suggested combining Walk induction ceremonies with other civic award events (to give all the awards more visibility), as well as allowing visitors to access online information on Walk honourees via QR codes near the markers.

== Requirements ==
The 2002 by-law that established the Walk of Fame also established ground rules for Walk inductees, some of which have been adjusted over the years:

- Any inductee (or if it is a group, at least one member of that group) must have been born in either the City of Sault Ste. Marie or the Algoma District, or have lived in the city or District for a minimum of 12 months at any point in their lifetime.
- The inductee must have, over a period of years, made an outstanding contribution to the community, or have achieved local, provincial, national, or international accolades in their chosen field of work. Such fields include but are not limited to academics, humanitarianism, medicine, science and technology, government or military service, business and industry, arts and entertainment, athletics or other competitive endeavors.
- Nominations for inductees can be submitted by the general public, but must be received by the City Clerk's office no later than March 31 of the intended year of honour. (This date may vary, however; the 2012 deadline occurred on April 30.)
- Nominations received at the City Clerk's office by the deadline are then considered by the Walk of Fame Committee for inclusion in that year's Walk of Fame inductee class.
- No more than 10 inductees would be honoured in the Walk's inaugural year.
- Until 2015, no more than 5 inductees could be honoured in any year after the inaugural year; from 2018 onward, the maximum number would be reduced to 2 inductees per year.
- No person or group can be honoured more than once on the Walk.
- The list of annual inductees must be announced to the general public; this is usually done in late May or early June.
- Formal dedication ceremonies for the markers must be open to the public as well; prior to the Walk's restoration project, these ceremonies were usually conducted each autumn on the GFL Memorial Gardens grounds.

== Markers and location ==
In the Walk of Fame's original concept, each inductee was immortalized on a 16-inch granite stone square. Within each square was a marble maple leaf displaying the inductee's name and year of induction. The markers were originally embedded in the sidewalk facing Queen Street, in front of the north end of the GFL Memorial Gardens and the adjacent Memorial Square.

The restored Walk project, which was formally unveiled in December 2017, features cabinets in four locations throughout Downtown Sault Ste. Marie: the GFL Memorial Gardens, the Memorial Tower, the Art Gallery of Algoma, and a parkette at the corner of Queen and March Streets. Each cabinet contains marble leafs that are either replacements for markers damaged at the original Queen Street location, restored markers from the original Walk (and removed from their granite squares), or markers for more recent inductees. The double-sided steel cabinets (each can hold up to 12 markers) are mounted on concrete bases and also feature transparent protective covers, made from the polycarbonate Lexan, through which the markers can be viewed.

== Inductees ==
Note: ^{(P)} indicates a posthumous induction

Year of Induction	Honoree	Background
2006	Roberta Bondar	neurologist, astronaut, and the first Canadian woman in space
2006	Francis H. Clergue^{(P)}	industrialist and visionary
2006	Ken Danby	artist
2006	Ron Francis	NHL player
2006	Joanie and Gary McGuffin	adventurers, conservationists, and authors
2006	Ted Nolan	NHL- and junior-level hockey coach
2006	Kevin Scott	world-record-setting speedskater
2006	Morley Torgov	author and humourist
2006	Treble Charger	recording artists
2006	Jessica Tuomela	Paralympic swimmer
2007	Phil Esposito	NHL player, executive, and Team Canada 1972 alumnus
2007	Tony Esposito	NHL player, executive, and Team Canada 1972 alumnus
2007	Harry Graham^{(P)}	forester and academic
2007	John Rhodes^{(P)}	broadcaster and politician
2007	Darren Zack	softball pitcher
2008	John Barker^{(P)}	local union leader and driving force behind The Sault's Group Health Centre
2008	Angelo Bumbacco	junior hockey executive and co-founder of the Sault Ste. Marie Greyhounds
2008	Joni Henson	lyric spinto soprano
2008	Dr. David Walde	oncologist, cancer treatment pioneer, and hospital fundraiser
2009	Doreen Hume	Coloratura Soprano soloist
2009	Edie Kerr^{(P)}	organizer of many curling events, including the 1978 Macdonald Lassies Tournament and 1990 Labatt Brier
2009	Russ Ramsay^{(P)}	broadcasting executive and MPP for Sault Ste. Marie
2009	MCpl Scott Vernelli^{(P)}	served in Afghanistan with The Royal Canadian Regiment
2010	Eric Alessandrini	fundraiser and volunteer
2010	Dr. Peter Black	neurosurgeon
2010	Douglas Bradford	artist
2010	Jo Forman^{(P)}	advocate of secondary school athletics
2011	Trixie Hardy	Dance instructor and theatrical producer
2011	Tanya Kim	Television personality (etalk) and philanthropist
2011	Walter Wallace^{(P)}	Educator, member of the Canadian Forces (49th Field Artillery Regiment, RCA) and humanitarian
2012	Ross Mervyn	Retired steelworker and promoter of anti-drug education and causes
2012	Walter Newman^{(P)}	Founder of the Boys Naval Brigade
2012	Brian Vallee^{(P)}	Journalist (Sault Star, Toronto Sun, Toronto Star, The Fifth Estate) and author (Life with Billy)
2012	Tony Van Den Bosch	Social worker and pioneer in addiction treatment
2013	Sir William Hearst^{(P)}	Attorney, MPP for Sault Ste. Marie, and Premier of Ontario (1914-1919)
2013	Team Jacobs (Note: Team Jacobs consists of skip Brad Jacobs as well as Ryan Fry, E. J. Harnden, and Ryan Harnden)	Competitive curlers (champions of the 2013 Tim Hortons Brier)
2014	Mac and BJ Marcoux	Paralympian alpine skiers
2014	Lester Pyette	Journalist/editor (Sault Daily Star, Calgary Sun, Toronto Sun, The London Free Press) and publishing executive (Sun Media)
2015	Helen Arvonen^{(P)}	Author
2015	James W Curran^{(P)}	Publisher of the Sault Star and founder of the Sault Rotary Community Day Parade
2018	Robert-Ralph Carmichael^{(P)}	Artist and designer of the common loon image on the $1 Canadian coin
2018	Mae & Dr. Lou^{(P)} Lukenda	Philanthropists (benefactors of educational, athletic, and medical causes) and entrepreneurs (majority owner of Sault Ste. Marie Greyhounds)
2019	David Johnston; Sharon Johnston	Academic and the 28th Governor General of Canada; Writer, philanthropist, and mental health advocate
2019	Sherry Walsh	Dancer and artistic director of the Sherry Walsh Academy of Dance Arts
2021	Carey Bock^{(P)}	Champion in the sports of darts and ten-pin bowling
2021	Joseph Klukay^{(P)}	NHL all-star and Stanley Cup champion (Toronto Maple Leafs, Boston Bruins)
2022	Tim Ryan^{(P)}	Musician (co-founding member of Jackson Hawke)
2022	Bob Yeomans^{(P)}	Musician (co-founding member of Jackson Hawke)
2024	Doug Hook	

== See also ==
- Sault Ste. Marie, Ontario
- Algoma District, Ontario
- GFL Memorial Gardens
