= Tony Cote =

First elected Chief of Cote First Nations

Tony Cote (born Antoine Cote; 1935–July 31, 2019) was the first elected Chief of the Cote First Nations and creator of the Saskatchewan First Nations Summer and Winter Games. Born on the Cote Reserve in Kamsack, Saskatchewan, Cote was known for his philanthropy for First Nations people in Saskatchewan and Alberta. Cote also served as a bombardier with the 81st Field Regiment in the Royal Canadian Artillery from 1952 to 1958.

== Personal life ==
Born on the Cote Reserve in Kamsack, Saskatchewan, in 1935, Cote was the youngest child of Frank and Ellen Cote and great-grandson of Chief Gabriel Cote, a spokesman for the Saulteaux communities during the signing of Treaty 4. After enduring the residential school system in Saskatchewan - having attended St. Phillips Residential School - Cote joined the Canadian Army in 1952 at the age of 17. In 1953 Cote married his wife, Sadie Friday, and they went on to parent seven children together. Cote spent nearly six years as a bombardier in the 81st Field Regiment of the Royal Canadian Artillery, served 14 months fighting in the Korean War, and was released from service in 1958 with a UN Korea Special Services Medal.

Cote died on July 31, 2019, at the age of 84.

== Political career ==
Between 1967 and 1995, Cote held a number of positions within Alberta and Saskatchewan politics. Cote served as welfare administrator and recreation director of the Cote First Nations until 1970, when he was then elected chief of Cote First Nations reserve. From 1969 until 1980, Cote was appointed as education community development officer, recreation director, and executive treasurer of finance for the Federation of Saskatchewan Indians (now known as the Federation of Saskatchewan Indian Nations). Cote also served as a political advisor for the Federation of Saskatchewan Indian Nations for 17 years between 1978 and 1995. From 1990 to 1995, Cote acted as executive director of the Saskatchewan Indian Housing Commission. Additionally, Cote held positions as special advisor to the regional director of the Canada Employment and Immigration Commission with the federal government, executive director for NOR-SASK Native Outreach Inc., and served twice as chief of the Yorkton Tribal Council - from 1973 to 1976 and 1995 to 2000. In 2001 and 2002, Cote held the position of Coordinator Officer for the Saskatchewan First Nations Veterans Association, where he pushed for the recognition of benefits owed to First Nations soldiers - ultimately leading to benefit packages being awarded to Saskatchewan First Nations veterans.

In addition to Cote's political career, he was known for his contributions to First Nations sport in Saskatchewan and Alberta and his philanthropizing work for First Nations people and communities. Cote spearheaded a number of housing improvement and employment projects in First Nations communities and co-founded the First Nations University of Canada, where he worked until 2015.

== Contributions to sport ==
After being elected recreation sports director in 1969, Cote began to develop sport and recreation programs and infrastructure in Saskatchewan First Nations communities. Cote was notably responsible for the construction of an outdoor ice rink in the Cote First Nations and for the Cote Recreational Complex which housed the first artificial ice surface in Saskatchewan First Nations.

Cote is also responsible for creating, managing, and coaching a number of First Nations sports teams. After the opening of the Cote Recreational Complex, Cote established and acted as president of the first all-Native Junior "B" hockey team in Saskatchewan. Cote followed this by creating and managing the "Wagonburners" - Saskatchewan's first all-Native Old-timers hockey team - who won the Saskatchewan East Division in 1977. Additionally, Cote managed the Cote Selects women's fastball team between 1974 and 1978, bringing the team to a number of tournaments around North America.

Outside of his role as manager and coach, Cote was instrumental in the creation of sport programs and events for First Nations communities. Cote is most well known for creating the inaugural Saskatchewan First Nations Summer Games, which now includes a Winter edition and is known as the Tony Cote Summer and Winter Games. The Summer and Winter editions of the Tony Cote Games run in opposite years of one another and feature biennially, including teams from both Saskatchewan and Alberta.

== Awards and recognition ==
Cote received a great deal of recognition for his role with sport and development of First Nations communities. Cote was awarded the 1974 Tom Longboat Award - an award which recognizes Aboriginal individuals for their contributions to sport in Canada. In 2008, Cote was awarded with the Saskatchewan Order of Merit for "recognition of excellence, achievement and contributions to the social, cultural and economic well-being of the province and its residents". Additionally, Cote was inducted to the Saskatchewan Sports Hall of Fame on June 18, 2011.
