= George Poitras =

Chief of the Peepeekisis Cree Nation (1937–2005)

George Lawrence Poitras, Paskwaw-Mostos-Kapimotet (Walking Buffalo) (1937 – November 7, 2005) was a teacher and later Chief of the Peepeekisis Cree Nation.

== Early years and education ==
George Poitras was born to parents, Enoch and Martha (Brass) Poitras, in 1937 on April 1 at the Fort Qu'Appelle Indian Hospital. In his early life he was a member of the Peepeekisis Band, the File Hills Reserve

He attended Lebret Industrial School also known as Qu'Appelle Indian Residential School (Q.I.R.S.) located on the outskirts of Lebret, Saskatchewan, for 12 years, including when it later opened as St. Paul's High School in 1948. He received his grade 12 diploma in June 1957. In 1999, George Poitras filed a lawsuit alleging he was abused by a priest during his time at Lebret. In 2004 he received some reparation for the abuse suffered.

== Sports ==
Sports were a very important method of assimilation at the residential schools and Lebret, for one, "developed outstanding athletic programs" and athletes. George Poitras (in 1957) was one of four students from the school who received the Tom Longboat Award established by Indian Affairs and the Amateur Athletic Union of Canada. Arthur Obey (in 1951 and 1960), Gerald Starr (1954), and Herbert Strongeagle (1953) were the other three. Sports and games were used by students to endure their institutionalization.

Zeman, et al. report that the first native high school and sports were introduced in 1948 by Father Paul Piechet. In contrast, Sister Marcoux reports that Mr. Ed Doll started building the juvenile hockey team in 1946. The Qu’Appelle team sweater was made to resemble those of the Montreal Canadiens, with the CH logo being replaced by an “Indian head”. Official sources such as the Saskatchewan Hockey Association refer to the hockey team as the Lebret Indians, though other sources referenced may use Lebret Pucksters or the Lebret Eagles.

Poitras attended Qu'Appelle Indian Residential School from roughly 1945–57. He played hockey, baseball, rugby and basketball while there.

The high school sports teams were very successful during, and after, his tenure:

- 1952: Qu'Appelle Valley Intermediate Hockey League, First Place aka Q.V.H.A Champions. See photo of winning team and article that notes Poitras is a "second year" man at this time.
- Junior "B" Atholl Murray Trophy as Junior "B" Champions in 1954–55 with Poitras playing "defense" and Gerald Starr in goal (entered Saskatchewan Amateur Hockey Association for first time), and 1955–56, 1956–57 (team photo including Poitras, and Art Obey), 1957–58, 1958–59. See photo of 1955(?) team on page 42 of Sister Marcoux, and 1955–56 team in photo with Juvenile "B" team on page 241 of Zeman et al., though both photos are not captioned.

Poitras "was a defenseman in hockey for many years playing with Q.I.R.S., Yorkton Terriers, Kamsack Flyers, Balcarres Broncs, Fort Falcons, Sioux Indians, Lloydminster Borderchiefs as well as in Moose Jaw. He played...basketball, baseball, minor and senior fastball and also enjoyed curling, football and soccer."

== Career ==
Identified as attending Teachers College at Moose Jaw when he was announced a Tom Longboat winner. He taught for thirteen years at various Indian schools in Saskatchewan. During this time, he coached various sports teams, including basketball, baseball, minor and senior fastball. After retiring from teaching, George entered politics serving as Councillor and Chief for Peepeekisis.

During his tenure as Chief, he helped pioneer a program intended to help the formation of teachers in the community with the Peepeekisis Indian Teachers Education Program. An article in the Indian Record notes a George Poitras as a member of the 13-member Qu'Appelle Indian Residential Council running the "first Indian-operated student residence of its kind in the province of Saskatchewan" at the newly named White Calf Collegiate. Additionally, he helped develop an agri-energy business that produced ethanol and ethanol byproducts.

In November 1981 Chief George Poitras was identified as being a member of the Board for the Saskatchewan Indian Federated College.

He was also a witness called before the Sub-Committee and Special Committee on Indian Self-Government in Saskatoon, March 1, 2, and 3, 1983 for the Penner Report, aka Indian Self Government in Canada: Report of the Special Committee on Indian Self-Government.

His eulogy would state that "George dedicated his lifetime to the development of Indian people on Peepeekisis and in Saskatchewan."

== Personal life and death ==
Poitras was married Marie Alma Quinney for 43 years. They had six children.

Poitras died on November 7, 2005, at the Fort Qu'Appelle All Nations Healing Hospital at the age of 68 years.

== Legacy ==
His family have created the George Poitras Memorial Foundation, Inc. and have held at least one all native, George Poitras Memorial Hockey Tournament in 2007 (March 30 to April 1) and plan three more, annually.

The Treaty Law School was created in honour of George Poitras: "The legacy of the late George Poitras of Peepeekisis in the Treaty Four Territory includes Indian Treaty Advocacy and enforcement. His Indian Residential School Education Credits were used to initiate the school in 2015."

His daughter, Evelyn Poitras produced "Buffalo: A Memorial", a telling of the experience of her father at the Qu'Appelle Indian Residential School in Lebret, Saskatchewan, put into the context of other stories of healing and reconciliation."

== Awards ==
In 1957 Poitras was the first from Saskatchewan (File Hills Reserve) to receive the National (N) Tom Longboat Award for Hockey, Baseball, Rugby, and Basketball and was awarded the trophy in the St. Paul's Indian School Gym on November 22, 1957 (photo available p. 8).

Member of "two hockey teams inducted into the Indian Head Sports Hall of Fame, the Standing Buffalo Sioux Indians from Standing Buffalo First Nation and the Balcarres Broncs."
