= Delby Powless =

Personal information
- Nationality: Six Nations of the Grand River First Nation
- Born: July 3, 1980 (age 45) Six Nations, Ontario
- Height: 5 ft 7 in (170 cm)
- Weight: 180 lb (82 kg; 12 st 12 lb)

Sport
- Position: Forward
- Shoots: Right
- NCAA team: Rutgers (2004)
- NLL draft: 1st overall, 2004; Buffalo Bandits
- NLL teams: Buffalo Bandits
- MLL teams: Toronto Nationals
- CLA teams: Six Nations Chiefs; Six Nations Arrows; Six Nations Rebels
- Pro career: 2005–2010
Medal record
Representing Iroquois
Box lacrosse
World Indoor Lacrosse Championship
| Silver medal – second place | 2003 Canada |
| Silver medal – second place | 2007 Canada |

Delby Powless (born July 3, 1980), is a Mohawk lacrosse player from the Six Nations of the Grand River First Nation near Brantford, Ontario. He was born in Six Nations, Ontario, and is the grandnephew of Ross Powless and cousin of Gaylord Powless, both of whom are in the Canadian Lacrosse Hall of Fame. He has played for the Buffalo Bandits of the National Lacrosse League and the Hamilton Nationals of Major League Lacrosse. In 2003, Powless received the Tom Longboat Award as the top male Aboriginal athlete.

== Lacrosse career ==
=== Junior ===
Powless was still minor age while playing his first season with the Six Nations Jr.B Red Rebels for their inaugural season. He would then play for the Six Nations Arrows for of the OLA Junior A Lacrosse League for the remainder of his junior career.

In 1998, Powless had a career high 122 points, finishing third in league scoring. That same year, he led the Arrows to their league championship, and was given the "Dean McLeod Award" for Playoffs M.V.P.

Powless finished his junior career with 686 points (regular season and playoffs combined), ranking him 23rd all time in Canadian Junior A lacrosse history. Powless is currently the Six Nations Arrows All-Time leading scorer.

=== College ===
Powless played two years at Herkimer County Community College and two at Rutgers University. He was the Scarlet Knights' leading scorer in 2003 and 2004. At Herkimer, he was a two-time All-American. At Rutgers, he was also a two time All-American. He received his bachelor's degree at Bellevue University.

=== National Lacrosse League ===
Powless was drafted first overall by the Buffalo Bandits in the 2004 entry draft. During his five years with the Bandits, Powless totaled 201 points and helped the Bandits to their first NLL championship in years in 2008.

=== Major League Lacrosse ===
Powless played for the Toronto Nationals in 2009 and 2010. Won a Major League Lacrosse Championship in 2009.

=== International ===
Powless played on the Iroquois Nationals indoor team in the inaugural World Indoor Lacrosse Championship in 2003 and again in 2007. Both times the Iroquois earned silver medals. At the 2003 World Championships Powless was named to the All-World Team after leading the tournament in scoring. Powless played on the Iroquois Nationals U-19 team winning a bronze medal at the World Championships in Adelaide, Australia. He led the Iroquois team in scoring and was 4th in overall tournament scoring. Delby also played on the Iroquois Nationals field lacrosse team in the 2002 World Lacrosse Championship (17 goals, 5 assists) and in 2006 (18 goals, 7 assists). The Iroquois finished in fourth place in each tournament, losing to Australia both times.

== Statistics ==
=== NLL ===
| | | Regular Season | | | | | | Playoffs |
| Season | Team | GP | G | A | Pts | LB | PIM | GP | G | A | Pts | LB | PIM |
|---|---|---|---|---|---|---|---|---|---|---|---|---|---|
| 2005 | Buffalo | 13 | 20 | 24 | 44 | 57 | 4 | 1 | 1 | 4 | 5 | 2 | 0 |
| 2006 | Buffalo | 15 | 12 | 33 | 45 | 64 | 10 | 3 | 3 | 12 | 15 | 8 | 2 |
| 2007 | Buffalo | 15 | 21 | 22 | 43 | 50 | 4 | 2 | 2 | 6 | 8 | 9 | 2 |
| 2008 | Buffalo | 16 | 18 | 37 | 55 | 29 | 10 | 3 | 2 | 3 | 5 | 2 | 4 |
| 2009 | Buffalo | 8 | 3 | 11 | 14 | 10 | 0 | -- | -- | -- | -- | -- | -- |
| 2010 | Buffalo | 1 | 0 | 0 | 0 | 3 | 0 | -- | -- | -- | -- | -- | -- |
| NLL totals | | 68 | 74 | 127 | 201 | 213 | 28 | 9 | 8 | 25 | 33 | 21 | 8 |

=== OLA ===
| | | | Regular Season | | | | | Playoffs |
| Season | Team | League | GP | G | A | Pts | PIM | GP | G | A | Pts | PIM |
|---|---|---|---|---|---|---|---|---|---|---|---|---|
| 1996 | Six Nations Red Rebles | OLA Jr.B | 10 | 16 | 17 | 33 | 31 | 3 | 3 | 2 | 5 | 12 |
| 1996 | Six Nations Arrows | OLA Jr.A | 4 | 4 | 2 | 6 | 0 | -- | -- | -- | -- | -- |
| 1997 | Six Nations Arrows | OLA Jr.A | 18 | 37 | 44 | 81 | 65 | 15 | 34 | 23 | 57 | 19 |
| 1998 | Six Nations Arrows | OLA Jr.A | 22 | 63 | 59 | 122 | 31 | 17 | 41 | 38 | 79 | -- |
| Minto Cup | Six Nations Arrows | CLA | -- | -- | -- | -- | -- | 5 | 4 | 5 | 9 | 21 |
| 1999 | Six Nations Arrows | OLA Jr.A | 14 | 24 | 20 | 44 | 30 | 15 | 26 | 25 | 51 | 30 |
| 2000 | Six Nations Arrows | OLA Jr.A | 19 | 37 | 34 | 71 | 43 | 10 | 12 | 20 | 32 | 21 |
| 2000 | Six Nations Chiefs | MSL | 1 | 0 | 1 | 1 | 0 | -- | -- | -- | -- | -- |
| 2001 | Six Nations Arrows | OLA Jr.A | 18 | 30 | 51 | 81 | 23 | 13 | 20 | 33 | 53 | 24 |
| 2002 | Six Nations Stars | OLA Sr.B | 7 | 32 | 18 | 50 | 17 | 6 | 18 | 13 | 31 | 16 |
| 2002 | Six Nations Chiefs | MSL | 2 | 4 | 1 | 5 | 0 | -- | -- | -- | -- | -- |
| 2003 | Six Nations Chiefs | MSL | 13 | 24 | 22 | 46 | 49 | 4 | 5 | 8 | 13 | 0 |
| 2004 | Six Nations Chiefs | MSL | 13 | 31 | 32 | 63 | 7 | 10 | 14 | 21 | 35 | 9 |
| 2005 | Six Nations Chiefs | MSL | 17 | 32 | 40 | 72 | 24 | 7 | 7 | 6 | 13 | 19 |
| 2006 | Six Nations Chiefs | MSL | 15 | 7 | 35 | 42 | 0 | -- | -- | -- | -- | -- |
| 2007 | Six Nations Chiefs | MSL | 16 | 22 | 31 | 53 | 2 | 5 | 9 | 13 | 22 | 0 |
| 2008 | Six Nations Chiefs | MSL | 17 | 10 | 37 | 47 | 2 | 4 | 4 | 6 | 10 | 0 |
| 2009 | Six Nations Chiefs | MSL | 14 | 14 | 44 | 58 | 5 | 5 | 1 | 8 | 9 | 0 |
| 2010 | Six Nations Chiefs | MSL | 11 | 5 | 14 | 19 | 0 | 6 | 3 | 7 | 10 | 0 |
| Junior A Totals | | | 95 | 195 | 210 | 405 | 192 | 70 | 133 | 139 | 272 | 94 |
| Junior B Totals | | | 10 | 16 | 17 | 33 | 31 | 3 | 3 | 2 | 5 | 12 |
| Minto Cup Totals | | | -- | -- | -- | -- | -- | 5 | 4 | 5 | 9 | 21 |
| Senior A Totals | | | 116 | 149 | 257 | 406 | 89 | 41 | 43 | 69 | 112 | 28 |
| Senior B Totals | | | 7 | 32 | 18 | 50 | 17 | 6 | 18 | 13 | 31 | 16 |
