= 1983 Abby Hoffman Cup =

Canadian ice hockey championship trophy

Tournament details
- Venue: Brantford Civic Centre
- Dates: April 7–10, 1983
- Teams: 10

Final positions
- Champions: Burlington Ladies (1st title)
- Runners-up: Edmonton Chimos
- Third place: Maidstone Saskies

Tournament statistics
- Games played: 29

Awards
- MVP: Barb Nugent

The 1983 Abby Hoffman Cup was the second staging of Hockey Canada's women's national championships (at the time known as the Shoppers Drug Mart Women's National Hockey Championships). Ontario's Burlington Ladies won the Abby Hoffman Cup after a 5–3 win over Alberta's Edmonton Chimos.

In the final game, Burlington's Bev Beaver scored the game winner in the third period. Norma Landry was the Burlington hero with two goals scored in the first period.

== Teams participating ==
- North Vancouver Dynamos, British Columbia
- Edmonton Chimos, Alberta
- Maidstone Saskies, Saskatchewan
- Winnipeg Canadian Polish AC, Manitoba
- Burlington, Ontario
- Titan de Montréal, Quebec
- University of New Brunswick
- Prince Edward Island Supdettes
- Dalhousie Tigerettes, Nova Scotia
- St. John's Chargers, Newfoundland and Labrador
