= Tom Longboat Awards =

Honours for First Nations athletes and sportsmen

The Tom Longboat Awards were established in 1951 to recognize Aboriginal athletes "for their outstanding contributions to sport in Canada" and continues "to honour Indigenous athletes across Canada" annually. As a program of the Aboriginal Sport Circle, the awards provide a forum for acknowledging top male and female athletes both at the regional and national levels.

The Aboriginal Sport Circle offers each provincial and territorial Aboriginal sport body (P/T/TASB) the opportunity to select one male and one female Aboriginal athlete within their region. The regional recipients will be considered as nominees for the national award that is presented to the top male and female athletes at the annual induction ceremony hosted by Canada's Sports Hall of Fame.

Each of the regional Tom Longboat Award recipients receives a Tom Longboat Award medallion. The two national Tom Longboat Award winners receive Tom Longboat Award rings, and have their names added to the Tom Longboat Award Trophy, which is displayed in Canada's Sports Hall of Fame.

== Award history ==
"Of all the athletes in Canadian sport history, only a select few have a major award named in their honour." The Tom Longboat Awards are named in honour of Tom Longboat, a member of the Onondaga Nation from Six Nations of the Grand River who in the early 1900s made a name for himself as a long-distance runner, competing in races across North America and Europe. "In 1999, Maclean's magazine named him Canada's greatest sports legend of the 20th century. Befitting a hero, the Tom Longboat Award has been given since 1951 to the best aboriginal male and female amateur athletes in the country".

The Tom Longboat Awards were established in 1951 as a joint effort of the Department of Indian Affairs and the Amateur Athletic Union of Canada (AAUC). Between 1951 and 1972, Indian Affairs and the AAUC shared responsibility for the awards. Indian Affairs managed the awards at the local and regional levels, while the AAUC directed activities nationally. Responsibility of the awards shifted to the National Indian Brotherhood / Assembly of First Nations and Canadian Amateur Sports Federation (1973–1998) and since 1998, the Awards have been administered by the Aboriginal Sport Circle, the organization representing Aboriginal sport and recreation development in Canada.

== Principles ==
The Tom Longboat Award recognizes Aboriginal athletes who have attained significant personal achievements in sport. "In addition to their athletic achievements, recipients will have demonstrated a personal commitment to the principles of sportsmanship and fair play, while reflecting a holistic lifestyle as an Aboriginal Athlete".

== Eligibility ==
The Tom Longboat Award honours the accomplishments of athletes within a given program year (September 1 to August 31). Applicants must meet the following criteria to be eligible as nominees:

- Applicants must be of Aboriginal descent (inclusive of First Nations, Inuit and Métis)
- Applicants must be active within the year of nomination
- Applicants must demonstrate sportsmanship, fair play and ethics in sport
- Applicants must complete a nomination package and submit it to their P/TASB on or before the set deadline

== Tom Longboat Award winners ==
The following is a list of Tom Longboat Award winners Nationally and Regionally

Year	National Award Winner(s)	Location	Regional Award Winner(s)	Location
2025	Apollo Hess Shalaya Valenzuela	Alberta (Kainai) British Columbia (Tsehaht)		Ottawa
2024	Justina Di Stasio; Eli McLaughlin	Manitoba; British Columbia		
2023	Trina Ross; Connor Church	Manitoba		
2022	Leah Miller; Connor Church	Manitoba		
2021	Kerri Einarson; Conner Roulette	Manitoba		
2019	Cameron Gayleard; Lyric Atchison	Manitoba; British Columbia		
2018	Jocelyne Larocque; Michael Linklater	Manitoba; Saskatchewan		
2017	James Lavallée; Joy Spear Chief-Morris	Manitoba; Alberta		
2016			(partial list): Linden McCorrister Aiyana Hart	MB MB
2015			(partial list): Malachi Leclerc Sierra Halldorson	MB MB
2014			(partial list): Justin Krantz (Co-Winner) Zach Whitecloud (Co-Winner) Robyn Boulanger	MB MB MB
2013			(partial list): Braedan Boschman Christie Lavallee	MB MB
2012			(partial list): Logan Thacker Skylar Boulanger	MB MB
2011			(partial list): Kiinnan Stevenson-French Julie Desrochers	MB MB
2010			(partial list): Theoren (TJ) Constant Alyssa Bertholet	MB MB
2009	Ammon Crowfoot Brigette Lacquette	Alberta Manitoba	William Forsey Jillian Forsey Wade Googoo Holly Ann Denny Wasontiio Stacey Johnna Montour Keon Doblej Lindsay Doxtator Josh Ahmo Brigette Lacquette Todd Fiddler Ammon Crowfoot Jessie Lilly Phil Mack Brittany Schroeder Danielle Marcotte	NL NL NS NS EDN EDN ON ON MB MB SK AB AB BC BC YK
2008	Matthew Klein Alyssa Johnson	British Columbia Manitoba	Scott Cameron Alyssa Johnson Nikashantess Penashue Sabrina Muise William Cameron Electra Charles Matthew Klein Sandy Ward Eric Slipperjack Nancy Indian Joshua Kelly Danielle Marcotte Mark Anthony Gloade Sarah Gloade Gabriel Rabbitskin	MB MB NL NL SK SK BC BC ON ON YK YK NS NS EDN
2007	Cody Jamieson Stacie Anaka	Ontario British Columbia	(partial list): Cody Jamieson Stacie Anaka Joey Sutherland Gazheek Morrisseau-Sinclair Danielle Marcotte Sammy Kent Joshua Kelly Jason Bessey Alora Dawn Blanchard	ON BC MB MB YK YK YK NL NL
2006	Sidney Smith Doris Jones	Ontario Manitoba	Matthew Klein Chelsie Mitchell Ian Manyfingers Raven Shade Scott Mills Shay-Anne Daniels Emory Wells Doris Jones Sidney Smith Josh Sacobie Jonathon Rice Tammy Cote Ashton Bernard Ashley Julian Atshapi Andrew Marie Penashue Chris Vance Jessica Trotter Michael Putulik	BC BC AB AB SK SK MB MB ON NB EDN EDN NS NS NL NL YK YK NU
2005	Dallas Soonias Marisha Roman	Alberta Ontario	(partial list): Dallas Soonias Shelley Hruska Marisha Roman Justin Sinclair-Paul Lori Letandre Brittanee Laverdure Shane & Roy Byrne (co-winners) Charmane Naytowhow Alwyn Piche	AB ON MB MB YK NL SK SK
2004	Richard Peter Lara Mussell	British Columbia British Columbia	(partial list): Richard Peter Lara Mussell Michele King Nathan O'Nabigon Garnet Desjarlais Shelly Hruska Jocelyn Boutillier Jeremy Harper	BC BC ON ON MB MB YK YK
2003	Delby Powless Deanna Sullivan	Ontario Alberta	(partial list): Sheldon Lainchbury Lara Mussell Delby Powless Deanna Sullivan Jared Fletcher Tawny Dillabough Kelcy Armstrong Jaron Tuton	BC BC ON AB MB MB YK YK
2002	Jordin TootooSara-Lynn Knockwood	Nunavut Nova Scotia	(partial list): Barry Beniot-Conne River Janice Margaret Forsyth Wallace Ahmo Jr Donna Mathieson	NL ON MB MB
2001	Tara Hedican Shawn Bobb	Ontario British Columbia	Shawn Bobb Denise Wilson Tara Hedican Brandon Nolan Matt Simonson Kayla Narvie Jason Louttit Holly Anderson Paul McDonald Robin Beaulieu Jason Baxter Fallon Head Craig Gagnon Johnathon Rice Tony Eetuk	BC BC ON ON NB NB MB NFLD NFLD NWT NWT SK YK EDN NU
2000	Richard Peter Gina Olsen	British Columbia British Columbia	Richard Peter Gina Olsen Tia Perley Nicholas Sark Jessica Jacobs Douglas Johnson Katrina Pitawanakwat Albert Doxtator Barry Benoit Jocelyn Davis Charleton Weaselhead Kateri Francis Roderick Gould Jr. Karine Carlish Charly Washipabano Lauren Melnyk Jason Breland June Pangon Jordin Tootoo	BC BC NB NB YK YK ON ON NFLD AB AB PEI PEI EDN EDN MB MB NU NU
1999	Darren Zack Waneek Horn-Miller	Ontario Eastern Door & North	Darren Zack Julie Hill Waneek Horn-Miller Jonathon Kane Treva Thomas Krystal Mason Jeff Peter Rachel Mathiasen Pipon Moose Jacqueline Lavallee Dana Laframboise Jocelyn Rose Davis Clint Lapatack Seymour Doucette Edward Gohn Jr.	ON ON EDN EDN NB YK YK ? MB SK SK AB AB NS BC
1998	Dan Calhoon			
1997	Bruce Paizen			
1996				
1995	Clifford Grieves Francis X. DeBassiaee	Manitoba		
1994	Ryan Bates Alanaise O. Ferguson	Manitoba Agassiz		
1993				
1992				
1991				
1990				
1989	Johnny D. Brisebois	Kahnawake		
1988	Mona Jones (First year for "Heroes of our Time" award)			
1987	Rick Brant	Tyendenaga Mohawk Territory	Robert Levi Eleonore Sioui William R. Plain Terry Wayne Bone Willis Vernon Parnell	Big Cove New Brunswick Village des Hurons, Wendake Waterloo Winnipeg Prince Rupert
1986	Suspended (Only 1 Candidate)	Suspended (Only 1 Candidate)	Suspended (Only 1 Candidate)	Suspended (Only 1 Candidate)
1985	Tom Erasmus	Whitefish Lake Band	Sherri Paul-Bartlett Doris Henhawk	Woodstock New Brunswick Six Nations
1984	Alwyn Morris	Kahnawkake		
1983	Suspended (No Funding)	Suspended (No Funding)	Suspended (No Funding)	Suspended (No Funding)
1982	Tyler Sunday	St. Regis	Everett Sanipass Robert Leslie Rice Rochelle Wells Joe Mason	Big Cove New Brunswick Parry Island Band Cardstone Dawson City
1981	Gordon Lee Crowchild	Sarcee Reserve	Simon Marshall Roger Paul Vicky Rice Terry Albert	Sydney Nova Scotia Fredericton New Brunswick Kahnawake Muncey
1980	Beverly Beaver	Six Nations		
1979	Steve Collins	Fort William Reserve	Reginald Lloyd Ginnish	Eel Ground
1978	Carole Polchies			
1977	Alwyn Morris	Kahnawake (Chaghnawaga)		
1976	Beverly Stranger Reginald Underwood	Timiskaming Band Tsawout Band	Malcolm Constant	James Smith Reserve
1975	John C. Courchene	Fort Alexander Reserve	Mary Marlene Ward Roger Vincent John Kelly Malcolm Constant Jacob Wilton Littlechild	Red Bank New Brunswick Quebec Ontario James Smith Reserve Hobbema
1974	Jacob Wilton Littlechild	Edmonton	Wayne Morris Robert Atwin Alwyn Morris Chief Tony Cote Vern Baker Joe Mason	Cape Breton Island Nova Scotia Fredericton New Brunswick Chaghnawaga Kamasack Vancouver Yukon Territory
1973	Raymond Rousselot	Bersimis	Cecil Jacobs Kenneth Eastman Narcisse Blood Jr. Felix Moses	Southern Ontario Pipestone Alberta British Columbia
1972	Howard Sinclair Anderson	Sioux Lookout	Miss Collette Cimon Miss Sally Jacob Dwayne Johnson Arnold Wesley Lawrence Crate Clane Anthony Sparvier	Edmunston New Brunswick Nemiscan Samson's Band Southern Ontario Manitoba Alberta
1971	Doug Skead	Northern Ontario	Leonard Francis Michael Paul Kenneth Kane Harold Wayne Brant Robert Hart James Thomas McKenzie	Picton Landing Nova Scotia Chaghnawaga Southern Ontario Manitoba Saskatchewan
1970	Kenneth Joseph Montour	Alberta	Clarence Abraham Smith Lewis Andrew Deslisle Miss Nellie Trapper William (Bill) Seward Sr. Harry Clearsky Bruce Dennis Wolfe	Eskasoni Nova Scotia Chaghnawaga Moose Factory Band Nanaimo Band Manitoba Saskatchewan
1969	Bert Mistaken Chief	Blood-Peigan District	Roland Sappier Ronald Kirby Walter Isbister Stanley Joseph Dwight Smith Miss Rosalind Merrick Derald Dubios	Tobique New Brunswick Chaghnawaga Sandy Lake Squamish Quebec Manitoba Saskatchewan
1968	Phyllis Bomberry	Southern Ontario	Alfred Sanipass Edward Wolf Child Jr. Arthur Herman Helin Tobil Dick James Daniel Bellegarde	Big Cove New Brunswick Blackfoot Band Port Simpson Manitoba Saskatchewan
1967	Jacob Wilton Littlechild	Hobbema-Ermineskin Band	Arthur Quoquochi Miss Leona Sparrow Antoine Mountain James Smith Beverly Beaver Edward Arnold McKenzie	Pointe Bleue Indian Agency Vancouver Fort Smith Manitoba Southern Ontario Saskatchewan
1966	Renson Jamieson	Southern Ontario	Cynthia Paul (now Gabriel) Charles Patton Omer Goodstriker Stephen Belleau Headley Colon Allan Asapace	Woodstock New Brunswick Caughnawaga Cardston Alkali Lake Manitoba Saskatchewan
1965	George [Merman] Brown	Queen Charlotte Indian Agency	Jacob Wilton Littlechild Zaccheus Hamilton Allan Richard Lickers	Hobbema Indian Agency Manitoba Southern Ontario
1964	Gaylord Ross Powless	Southern Ontario	Oscar Kistabish Nick Breaker Vivian Underwood Grenville Crate Marcel Greyeyes	Abitibi Agency Blood Agency Cowichan Agency Manitoba Saskatchewan
1963	John Lewis	Ontario	Harold PaulGeorge Norton Melville Baxter Stephen Wadsworth John Douglas White Robert Beaulieu Doctor Garson	Shubenacadie Nova Scotia Caughnawaga Nakina Agency Blood Agency Cowichan Agency Fort Smith Agency Manitoba
1962	Tom Watts	Port Alberni	Winston James Paul Arthur Quoquochi Samual William Chum Edwin Wells Anderson Pete Hubert Kematch	St. John River Agency Abitibi Agency James Bay Agency Blood Agency Saskatchewan Manitoba
1961	Bruce Bruyere	Northern Ontario	Clarence Smith Philippe Bazil Hommer Healy Myrna Williams Franklin White Colin Williams Allan Joseph Felix	Annapolis Valley Pointe Bleue Blood Band Skidegate Southern Ontario Manitoba Saskatchewan
1960	Arthur Obey	Saskatchewan	Charles Sark Thadee Andre Leonard Good Eagle Donald Edwards John Lee Stonefish Walter Noel	Lennox Island Nova Scotia Seven Islands Blackfoot Agency Lytton Agency Southern Ontario Manitoba
1959	Walter G. Noel	Manitoba	Alexander Denny Aurelien Gill Donna Laura Pine Roddy Vincent Tait Dennis Shipman	Eskasoni Nova Scotia Pointe Bleue Garden River Skeena River (Southern Ontario
1958	Randolph Youngman	Blackfoot Agency	Michael V. Francis Laureat Rock Charles Patrick Faries Teddy Joe Betty Lorraine Jewel Ernest J. Scott Vernon Bellegarde	Shubenacadie Bersimis James Bay Vancouver Southern Ontario Manitoba Saskatchewan
1957	George Poitras	Saskatchewan	Reginald Paul Martin Beardy Glenn Maracle Stanley Wilson Victor Starlight	Kingsclear Sioux Lookout Southern Ontario Manitoba Alberta
1956	Edward Vernon Campbell	Musqueam Band Vancouver	Russell Brooks Mathieu Labbe Roy Vernon Mainville George Gary Edgar Louis Harper Vernon Bear	Shubenacadie Quebec Northern Ontario Southern Ontario Manitoba Saskatchewan
1955	Paul Goulais	Northern Ontario	Walter Paul Betty Goulais Eddie Soup Lister Isbister George Nepinak	New Brunswick Northern Ontario Alberta & Northwest Territories Saskatchewan Manitoba
1954	Charles Ross Smallface	Alberta & Northwest Territories	Barry Delisle Edward Kabatay Charles William (Bill) Kinoshameg Gerald Starr Philip Morin	Quebec Nova Scotia Northern Ontario Saskatchewan Manitoba
1953	Edward Kabatay	Sydney Indian Reserve NS	Marven Morris Frank Wesley Charles Ross Smallface Herbert Strongeagle Henry Morriseau Thomas Davey	Caughnawaga Lac Seul Alberta & Northwest Territories Saskatchewan Manitoba Southern Ontario
1952	John Sark	Lennox Island NS	Joseph Two-Rivers Francis Debassige Ross Powless Leslie Andrew Charles Ross Smallface Peter Sackamoose George Colin Wasacase	Caughnawaga Northern Ontario Six Nations British Columbia & NWT Alberta Saskatchewan Manitoba
1951	Frederick Baker	British Columbia & NWT	Wilfred J. Prosper Ronnie Delisle Henry Wibokamigad Ross Powless Charles Ross Smallface Arthur Obey	Nova Scotia New Brunswick Northern Ontario Six Nations Alberta Saskatchewan
