= Arthur Obey =

Arthur "Art" Obey (1931/1932–1988) was a Canadian ice hockey coach with the Lebret Indians. He was a participant in multiple sports and twice received the Tom Longboat Award (1951, 1960). He went on to work in sports and recreation at various locations in Saskatchewan, including initiating the Indian Summer Games in that province. He is considered a "builder and leader in recreation and sport development for Aboriginal people."

== Early years ==
Arthur Obey was born November 25 in 1931 or 1932 on Piapot First Nation or in Fort Qu'Appelle. His parents were Mr. and Mrs. George Obey of the Sioux and of the Saulteaux First Nation, respectively.

Obey attended Lebret Industrial School (also known as Qu'Appelle Indian Residential School, Lebret Indian School, or locally as Indian School), located on the outskirts of Lebret, Saskatchewan in the 1940s. The school was run by the Oblates (in charge of the boy students) with the assistance of the Grey Nuns (in charge of the girl students). St. Paul's High School later opened at the Indian School in 1948. Arthur Obey was one of four Tom Longboat Award winners at the Lebret school; the others are George Poitras (1957), Herbert Strongeagle (1953) and Gerald Starr (1954).

== Education ==
In his early years as a student, Obey spent half the day in the fields learning farming techniques and a half day in class. Zeman et al. also report that the first native high school and sports were introduced in 1948 by Father Paul Piechet. "Every boy in that original 1948 high school class...were all members of the hockey team," including Obey. In contrast, Sister Marcoux reports that Edward Doll started building the juvenile hockey team in 1946. "The Qu'Appelle team sweater was patterned after those of the Montreal Canadiens, with the exception that an "Indian head" replaced the traditional ch [sic] logo that the Canadiens wore on the front of their jerseys." Official sources such as the Saskatchewan Hockey Association refer to the hockey team as the Lebret Indians, though other sources may use Lebret Pucksters or the Lebret Eagles.

Obey played hockey and baseball and was a "short-distance runner" while at the school. "He is well known for his baseball exploits in Southern Saskatchewan and was a top-notch pitcher for such clubs as Notre Dame of Wilcox, Fort Qu'Appelle and periodically the Lebret Indians." A photo of the 1949 Lebret baseball team including Art Obey, part of an article originally published in the Prairie Messenger, was reprinted in The Indian Missionary Record in 1953. While a student, "from May to October 1949 Obey played baseball at Notre Dame College" on their team. In 1949, Art Obey and Thomas Desnomie co-wrote an article on vocational training at the Lebret Indian School.

He also became involved in the Cadet Movement with the Lebret School's Hugonard Cadet Corps formed in 1942 or 1944, and associated with the Royal Canadian Army Cadets. Sister Marcoux reports that in 1946, Obey did the Cadet Course at Dundern. In May 1948, the corps won the "Efficiency Trophy" and the "Challenge Cup" given to the best corps in the province. in 1950 he was elevated to the rank of Cadet Major, and was co-instructor for the students; the group achieved a mark of 85% and won the Eastern Division Shield. In 1952, Obey earned the Master Cadet Certificate.

== Personal life ==
Obey married Yvonne Adams from Muscow [likely means Muscowpetung First Nation] near Fort Qu'Appelle in 1951 (or July 7, 1952). They had a total of a total of nine children, four daughters and five sons. At the time the Zeman et al. interviewed Obey and their book was published (1983) Obey was reported to have been living in Meadow Lake, Saskatchewan.

== Career ==
The Indian Record newspaper states that Obey became Sports Director at Lebret Indian School in 1950. However, Zeman et al., who interviewed Art Obey for the book Hockey Heritage, report that Obey dropped out of high school in 1951 to enter the Recreation Leadership and Training Program in Red Deer, Alberta. He then became recreation director at Lebret as part of his in-service recreation program and went on to coach hockey successfully at Lebret until The Department of Indian Affairs phased out grades 11–12 in 1959. Obey reports it wiped out Junior "B" hockey at Lebret and that the league ended up folding. Zeman et al. state that Junior "B" hockey didn't return until 1962, the year Obey left Lebret.

As Coach, Athletics Director and sometimes player at Lebret, the Lebret Indians won:

- 1952: Qu'Appelle Valley Intermediate Hockey League, First Place a.k.a. Q.V.H.A Champions with "Coach Arthur Obey, star centre player."
- Junior "B" Atholl Murray Trophy as Junior "B" Champions in 1954-55 (entered Saskatchewan Amateur Hockey Association for first time), 1955–56, 1956–57, 1957–58 and, 1958–59.
- Juvenile "B" Shield as Juvenile "B" Champions in 1956 (but not according to the Saskatchewan Hockey Association), 1957, 1959 and, 1960.
- Juvenile "C" Al Pickard Trophy as Juvenile "C" Champions 1958.
- Midget "C" Ken Price Trophy as Midget "C" Champions, 1958.
- 1959: High School Mainline Hockey League Champions.
- 1959: Saskatchewan High School Athletic Association, "B" Basketball.

Obey would have played with and later trained George Poitras, and played with Herbert Strongeagle.

He also coached the track and field team which "dominated many local meets from 1955 to 1960." He likely trained Gerald Starr.

Further:

- 1954-1959: Balcarres Braves. Southern Saskatchewan Baseball League. Played as a pitcher.
- The Fort Qu'Appelle Sioux Indian hockey team, mostly Lebret graduates with Obey as coach and player, won the Intermediate "C" Champions in 1956–57. 1958 Saskatchewan "C" Championship.
- Played on the Fort Qu'Appelle Sioux Indians baseball team, in 1961 and 1962.

Obey attended a two-week summer school for supervisory staff at residential schools in 1962.

"Obey remained involved with sports at Qu'Appelle into the 1970s, when he served as the Qu'Appelle residence's recreation director."

After "15 years [as] Director of Recreation and Sports at the Lebret Indian Residential School, Sask., [Obey was] appointed Executive Director of the new Indian and Metis Friendship Centre at North Battleford". Obey worked at Friendship Centre for a few years before returning "to Piapot to be with his aging parents. By 1969 he was hired at the first full-time recreation director at Fort Qu'Appelle and was the minor hockey coordinator." In 1971, Obey is reported as being the Provincial Recreation Director for Saskatchewan Recreation Program set up under the auspices of the Federation of Saskatchewan Indians (FSI) in Prince Albert. A month later, the same newspaper noted that he was a member of the Governing Committee of the first Western Canada Native Winter Games to be held April 7–9, 1972. In 1974, he is recorded as being "recreation director at the Federation of Saskatchewan Indians' (FSI) new sports centre in Prince Albert in 1974, [and that] the Saskatchewan Indian Winter Games has become an annual event.

Recreation Director, Gordon Band.

"In 1974 Obey and Fred Sasakamoose...coached the Prince Albert bantam team to the northern final." The Saskatchewan Indian Bantam Hockey Team then went on to play eight exhibition games in Holland and Finland, six of which they won.

Obey eventually became a board member of Lebret Indian School [recorded as a member in 1980] which by 1980, was known as White Calf Collegiate.

In December 1980 he is recorded as being a "resource person" for the Saskatchewan Indian Recreation Directors training program as Art Obey of the F.S.I. and consultant for their (F.I.S.) alcohol and drug program.

Obey is also known to have worked for the Meadow Lake District Tribal Council, and as F.S.I. District Representative for the Touchwood - File Hills - Qu'Appelle District (1978 - 1980).

According to the Saskatchewan First Nations Sports Hall of Fame, "Obey (1931-1988) was a builder and leader in recreation and sport development for Aboriginal people... [and his] major accomplishments include coaching the First Nations women's fastball team and in 1974 initiating the Saskatchewan Indian Summer Games. Obey followed that up with the inaugural Saskatchewan Indian Summer Games in 1988. For nearly two decades Obey worked as a recreational coordinator for various native and non-native organizations." He is noted as having coached the first Canadian Women's Softball Team, likely the team previously mentioned.

== Awards ==
Art Obey received the Tom Longboat Award twice. He won the Regional (R) award in 1951 and the National (N) award in 1960.

In 1980, an Appreciation Award was awarded to both Art Obey and Tony Cote at the SIWA Conference on behalf of the First Canadians women's ball team .
