= Sara-Lynne Knockwood =

Canadian taekwondo athlete

Sara-Lynne Knockwood is a Canadian taekwondo athlete and a band member of Nova Scotia’s Indian Brook First Nation. She was raised in Enfield, Nova Scotia with her two sisters by her father Ron and her mother Jennifer. She won gold medals in the 2002 North American Indigenous Games (NAIG) in Winnipeg, Manitoba. She was inducted into Miꞌkmaq sports hall of fame in 2016 for her achievements in taekwondo.

== Taekwondo ==
Knockwood was introduced to taekwondo by her father who was an RCMP officer who encouraged Knockwood and her sisters to learn self defence. She first started training with David McKenna at McKenna’s Taekwondo club. Soon after she began training, Knockwood attended her first sanctioned World Taekwondo Federation tournament in Moncton, New Brunswick where she won gold. In 2002, Knockwood attended her first NAIG in Winnipeg, Manitoba. Knockwood won gold medals in the junior division of both sparring and poomse, while representing team Mi’kmaw Nova Scotia. In 2006, she attended the NAIG in Denver, Colorado, winning silver in sparring and gold in poomse, both in the senior division. Knockwood competed in the 6th World Open Championships Taekwondo international in Miami Beach, Florida. The event was hosted by the Taekwondo Association of Great Britain (TAGB) with teams representing Canada, US, South America, and Europe. Knockwood has also competed internationally at the Pan Am Games.

=== NAIG awards ===
- 2002 NAIG won gold in sparring junior division in Winnipeg, Manitoba
- 2002 NAIG won gold in poomse junior division in Winnipeg, Manitoba
- 2006 NAIG won silver in sparring senior division in Denver, Colorado
- 2006 NAIG won gold in poomse senior division in Denver, Colorado

=== Tom Longboat Award ===
Knockwood was awarded the Tom Longboat Award in 2002 at the national level.

== After competition ==
After competition, Knockwood attained a human kinetics degree at St. Francis Xavier University. Knockwood is currently working with the Mi’kmaq sport council of Nova Scotia regarding sport, recreation and health in Mi’kmaq communities. In 2014, she was involved in the Halifax NAIG bid committee and has sat as a member of the board of directors with AthletesCAN and the Association of Canada’s National Team Athletes. She has been a standing member of the tripartite forums sport and recreation committee. Knockwood was also involved in opening a taekwondo club within her community in Nova Scotia.
