= Herbert Strongeagle =

Herbert Strongeagle (born 1934 or 1935) is considered "a role model for 'breaking the stereotype, myths and perception of Native people that is constantly reinforced by hockey people and the media" by his community, and in 2006 received the First Nations Lifetime Achievement Award - Saskatchewan. Early in his life he was awarded the Tom Longboat Medal as Best Indian Athlete in Saskatchewan for his contributions to his junior baseball and midget and juvenile hockey teams, along with track and field and basketball, and continued to receive awards from his community for contributions through his lifetime.

== Indigenous Peoples History ==
The Truth and Reconciliation Commission 94 Calls to Action are dependent on identifying and making publicly available the history and legacy of residential schools and the history of Indigenous Peoples in Canada. There is a lack of documentation for their history as it was one of forced assimilation by a dominant culture looking to erase those cultures, which means little may be available. Plus digitization efforts to date have not prioritized items under copyright nor non-mainstream cultures and languages, resulting in claims of digital or electronic colonialism. Thus the lack of references from the mainstream culture for this entry.

== Early years ==
Herb Strongeagle was born in 1934 or 1935 and is from the Pasqua Reserve, Pasqua First Nation, Cowichan Bay, B.C. though Zeman, et al., report him as being from Piapot as does the Cowichan News Leader, commenting he came "from a humble start in Fort Qu’Appelle, Sask."

== Education ==
Strongeagle attended Lebret Industrial School also known as Qu'Appelle Indian Residential School located on the outskirts of Lebret, Saskatchewan for 12 years, starting at the age of 5. The school was run by the Oblates (in charge of the boys) with the assistance of the Grey Nuns (girls). St. Paul's High School later opened at the Indian School in 1948. Sports were a very important method of assimilation at the residential schools and Lebret, for one, "developed outstanding athletic programs" and athletes, and Herb Strongeagle was one of four students from the school who received the Tom Longboat Award established by Indian Affairs and the Amateur Athletic Union of Canada. George Poitras (1957), Gerald Starr (1954) and Arthur Obey (1951 and 1960) were the other three winners from the school. Sports and games were also used by students to endure their institutionalization.

According to the 1955 history of Lebret Indian School and other sources, he:

- "was a right winger on midget and juvenile teams."
- As a member of the Juvenile hockey team, played against the Regina Pats in the Saskatchewan finals (see 1952 QVHA Champions below). He played on the team with another Tom Longboat winner, Art Obey.
- Was in the Lebret IR School Band.
- Received his Master Cadet Certificate in 1952. Photo available in an article originally published in the Prairie Messenger, reprinted in The Indian Missionary Record in 1953.
- Graduated St. Paul's Indian High School in 1953.
- In 1959 he was elected Treasurer (while residing in Fort Qu'Appelle) of the newly established alumni association for St. Paul's Indian High School, to be called Lebret Indian High School Alumni. His fellow Longboat Award winner, Gerald Starr was appointed vice-president at the same meeting.

Strongeagle not only played sports with Art Obey but George Poitras and Gerald Starr were also present at the school and playing sports around the same time.

Strongeagle went on to attend Saskatoon Business College, then the University of Ottawa, where he graduated with a Bachelor of Commerce degree in 1973. While at university, he produced at least one article for a 4-page supplement (supplement titled Indian Week) for the student newspaper, The Carleton. He later received his Life Insurance License from the Insurance Councils of Saskatchewan.

== Sports ==
Zeman, et al. report that the first native high school and sports were introduced in 1948 by Father Paul Piechet. "Every boy in that original 1948 high school class...were all members of the hockey team," including Strongeagle. In contrast, Sister Marcoux reports that Mr. Ed Doll started building the juvenile hockey team in 1946. "The Qu’Appelle team sweater was patterned after those of the Montreal Canadiens, with the exception that an "Indian head" replaced the traditional ch logo that the Canadiens wore on the front of their jerseys." Official sources such as the Saskatchewan Hockey Association refer to the hockey team as the Lebret Indians, though other sources occasionally referred to throughout this entry may use Lebret Pucksters or the Lebret Eagles.

- 1952 Qu'Appelle Valley Intermediate Hockey League, First Place aka Q.V.H.A Champions. See photo of winning team in the November 1952 issue of The Indian Missionary Record and on page 42 of Sister Marcoux.
- Played first base for the Sioux Indians baseball club. Photo available in an article originally published in the Prairie Messenger, reprinted in The Indian Missionary Record in 1953.
- The Fort Qu'Appelle Sioux Indian hockey team, mostly Lebret graduates, won the Intermediate "C" Champions in 1956-57 and 1958 (Saskatchewan "C" Championship). Strongeagle played when they "won the provincial crown in 1957."
- Played on the Fort Qu'Appelle Sioux Indians baseball team, 1961 and 1962.
- Played hockey while attending the University of Ottawa.
- "After gaining his commerce degree, Strongeagle continued playing hockey with the Raymore Rockets..."
- He played in an Old-Timers tournament. The line-up for the Badgerville Screaming Eagles, whose nickname by 1976-77 was the Badgerville Wagonburners, included Herb Strongeagle.
- Strongeagle "flew in from Vancouver" to compete with the Chiefs (photo available) in an Old Timers Hockey Tournament in Anaheim California in 1981.
- Owner of a thoroughbred, Dainty Traveller that won the F.L. Marks memorial in 1976 at Marquis Downs, Saskatoon on July 2.

== Personal life ==
An AFOA Saskatchewan presentation including multiple photos offers the following information:

- Married to Joyce Munn, one of whose children is Colin James.
- His grandfather through his father is Strongeagle, a medicine man.
- His grandfather through his mother is Pat Cappo.
- His parents, Moses and Edna, were married in February, 1934 and he had 11(?) siblings of which five were sisters. One of his half brothers, named Elmer strongeagle-crane.
- He is the father of five.
- Received a headdress from Uncle John James Cappo (date unknown).
- Was present at the World Assembly of FN WAFN 1982 (role undefined).

== Career ==
Managed Kinookimaw Resort (date unknown).

Worked "with Regina's Co-op Oil Refineries while playing for the Fort Qu'Appelle Sioux Indians hockey team that won the provincial crown in 1957" (exact dates he played for the team are unknown).

Then came various "management and finance positions in Federal and Provincial Government Departments, on First Nation Reserves and with the Saskatchewan Indian Federated University College."

From 1986 to 1998 was a Regina Pats WHL scout.

From 2002 to 2005 was a Vancouver Canucks NHL Hocket scout.

Management team for the Halaw Group (2005?).

In 2007 he was reported as being President of the Aboriginal Financial Services Corporation, Director of Many Nations Benefit Cooperative Ltd., and "the first lay-bencher for the Law Society of Saskatchewan."

Also in 2007 he was also reported as being "Executive Director of Finance and Administration of the Institute of Indigenous Government in Vancouver, BC" and on the "AFN Indian Residential Schools Advisory Committee."

Honorary Chair when he made a bid for the 2017 National Aboriginal Hockey Championships.

Strongeagle "has spent the past 30-plus years assisting First Nations organizations, helping develop and maintain accountable financial records, completing audits and developing business plans for First Nations businesses and economic development initiatives."

== Awards ==
In 1953 he won the Tom Longboat Award, an award that honours outstanding First Nations athletes and sportsmen in each province; national male and female winners are selected from the provincial winners. He received the Regional (R) award at age 19 for Track and field, Hockey, Baseball, and Basketball.

Fort Qu'Appelle Fire Department Hall of Fame.

1996 Rural Sports Hall of Fame, Indian Head, Saskatchewan.

1997 Sports Hall of Fame, First Nations, Saskatchewan. One of the second set of inductees.

2006 Lifetime Achievement Award, First Nations, Saskatchewan.
