= Joni Henson =

Canadian operatic soprano (born 1977)

Joni Henson (born May 31, 1977) is a Canadian operatic soprano who was born and raised in Sault Ste. Marie, Ontario.

Henson's voice has been described as "thrilling and lilting" by Paula Citron of Opera Canada who says Henson "is clearly heading for a glittering career"

Henson has received very favourable reviews internationally and has been awarded top honours at several singing competitions in Europe, most notably receiving the Opera Grand Prize at the XVth Concours International de Chant de Verviers in Belgium and First Place Opera and French Melodie Awards at the Concours International de Chant de Marmande in France.

She continues to perform with the Canadian Opera Company, the Vancouver Symphony, the Kingston Symphony, and with the Toronto Mendelssohn Choir. Joni Henson, is considered a young ambassador for the Sault Ste. Marie community and was inducted into the Sault Ste. Marie Walk of Fame on September 20, 2008.

Henson attended the Music Academy of the West in 2003 and 2004.
