= James Lavallée =

Métis sprint kayaker (born 1997)

Personal information
- Born: October 6, 1997 (age 29) Canada
- Height: 185 cm (6 ft 1 in)
- Weight: 78 kg (172 lb)

Sport
- Country: Canada
- Sport: Sprint kayak

James Lavallée (born 6 October 1997) is a Métis sprint kayaker from Winnipeg, Manitoba, Canada. He is a Canada Games multiple medalist and a member of the Canadian Junior National Kayak Team.

Lavallée was the (male) recipient of the 2017 Tom Longboat Awards, awarded annually to the most outstanding male and female Indigenous athletes in Canada. He won the Inspire Award in the Youth-Métis category in 2019.

== Personal life ==
At an early age, Lavallée was diagnosed with both dyslexia and attention deficit hyperactivity disorder (ADHD), which led to a frustrating elementary school experience. To relieve the stresses of school life, Lavallée turned to the sport of kayaking at the age of eleven. His family would visit Fort Whyte, in southwestern Winnipeg, during the summers to take advantage of their kayaking program.

Overcoming his earlier learning disabilities, Lavallée is currently an environmental science student at the University of Manitoba. He was also recently named to Manitoba's CBC Future 40, showcasing influential Canadian change-makers under the age of forty.

He is currently a student at the University of Manitoba pursuing a Bachelor of Science degree in Ecology and Environmental Science.

== Athletic career ==
Lavallée was named the Canadian flag bearer at the 2014 ICF Junior & U23 Canoe World Championships in Szeged, Hungary. Lavallée also attended the 2015 ICF Junior & U23 Canoe World Championships in Milan, racing the K1 200-m Then, at the 2017 Canada Summer Games (hosted in his hometown of Winnipeg) Lavallée won three medals, including a silver in the K1 200-m and two bronzes in the K1 500-m and K4 200-m events (K referring to the number of athletes in the kayak).

His goal is to qualify for the 2020 Summer Olympics in Tokyo, Japan.

In 2018, he was named a 2019 Indspire Award recipient.

== Heritage ==
Red River Métis by descent, Lavallée works towards preserving his native culture. At his medal awarding ceremonies, most famously at the 2017 Canada Games, he would wear a ceinture fléchée (Métis sash). Lavallée has indicated that he intends to launch an Indigenous holistic kayaking program along with another Métis athlete.
