= David Sharpe (runner) =

British middle-distance runner (born 1967)

Personal information
- Nationality: British (English)
- Born: 8 July 1967 (age 58) Northumberland, England

Sport
- Sport: Athletics
- Event: middle-distance
- Club: Jarrow AC
Medal record
Men's athletics
Representing Great Britain
European Championships
Silver medal – second place	1990 Split	800 m

David Sharpe (born 8 July 1967) is a British former middle-distance runner.

== Biography ==
Sharpe won a silver medal at the European Championships in Split 1990 over 800 m. In 1988 he won the European Indoor Championships and in 1992 he came first in the 800 m race at the World Cup in Havana. In 1992 Sharpe won the B-race in Zurich in a personal best of 1:43.98 min.

Sharpe finished third behind Steve Cram in the 800 metres event at the 1986 AAA Championships. That year, Sharpe ran a British indoor U20 record of 1:48.53, a record that stood for 40 years until beaten by Matthew McKenna in 2026.

== International competitions ==
Year	Competition	Venue	Position	Event	Notes
Representing the Great Britain
1986	European Indoor Championships	Madrid, Spain	16th (h)	800 m	1:53.93
1986	World Junior Championships	Athens, Greece	1st	800 m	1:48.32
1986	World Junior Championships	Athens, Greece	5th	1500 m	3:46.94
1988	European Indoor Championships	Budapest, Hungary	1st	800 m	1:49.17
1990	European Championships	Split, Yugoslavia	2nd	800 m	1:45.59
1992	World Cup	Havana, Cuba	1st	800 m	1:46.06
