= Helen Arvonen =

Helen Margaret Arvonen (1918 – May 9, 1992) was a Canadian writer of Gothic literature and science fiction.

== Early life and family ==
Helen Arvonen was born Helen Dickinson in Thessalon, Canada, in 1918. During her childhood, her parents worked in railroad camps across northern Ontario as a camp cook and a seamstress, and she would travel to accompany them. It was during this period, at age 9, that she began writing, at her father's encouragement.

She eventually established herself in the city of Sault Ste. Marie. She married Sulo Arvonen, then, after being widowed, remarried Robert Conway, who also predeceased her. She had four children: Theone, Neil, Shiels, and Devon (who died at a young age).

== Writing ==
Helen Arvonen was known as an author of Gothic fiction and science fiction. While her writing ventured into the fantastical, it would also often refer to real settings in northern Ontario, particularly around Sault Ste. Marie. Early in her career, she sometimes published under a pseudonym, Lix Acrobee.

In the 1940s, her writing was published frequently in magazines like Fantasy and Crime. Then, in the late 1950s, she wrote radio and TV scripts for CJIC.

Arvonen published 15 novels, including The Summer of Evil (1965), Remember with Tears (1968), The Witches of Brimstone Hill (1971), and a novelization of The Two Mrs. Carrolls. Some of her books were also published in Europe, both in English and in translation.

== Death and legacy ==
Arvonen died in 1992, at age 74, in Sault Ste. Marie.

Her papers are held in the collections of the University of Oregon Libraries. In 2015, she was posthumously inducted into the Sault Ste. Marie Walk of Fame.
