= Lara Mussell Savage =

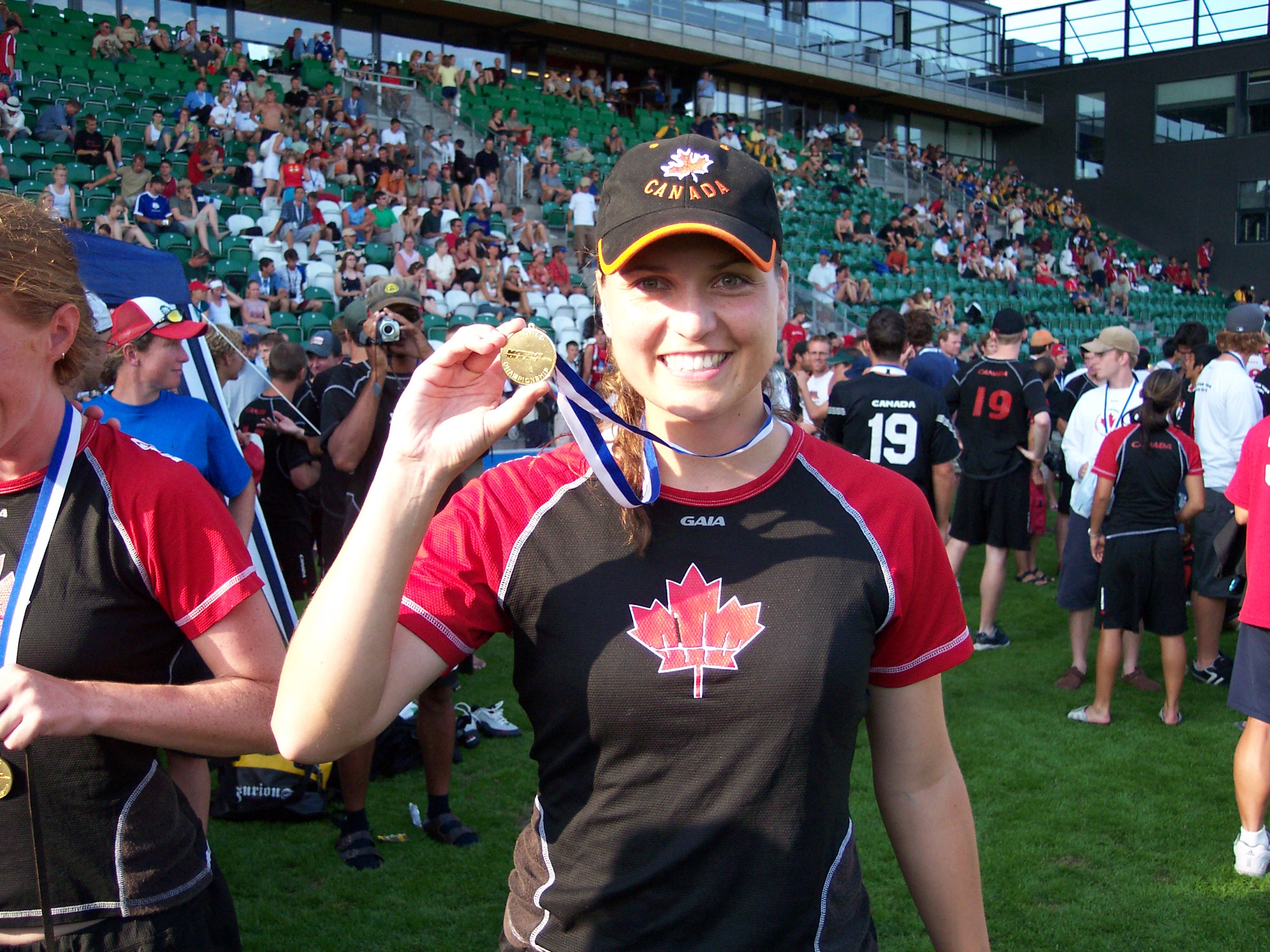
Lara Mussell Savage at the 2004 World Ultimate Championships in Turku, Finland. August 7, 2004.

Lara Mussell Savage is a world champion in Ultimate, earning a gold medal in both 2000 and 2004, as well as bronze medals in 1998 and 2008. Leading up to 2010, Lara was a part of the Vancouver Organizing Committee for the 2010 Olympic & Paralympic Winter Games (VANOC) as Project Manager for Aboriginal Sport and Youth. Previous to this, she was the Operations Manager for the Air Canada PGA Tour Championship. Adding to her resume, in 2015 Mussell Savage became an ambassador for viaSport's Gender Equity #LevelTheField campaign promoting gender equity in sport and became a Trustee for the British Columbia (BC) Sports Hall of Fame & Museum.

Mussell Savage is a member of Skwah First Nation, where she has served as an elected Councillor for her nation since 2014 and as Chief since being elected Chief in 2020. Mussell Savage was awarded the National Tom Longboat Award as Canada's Female Aboriginal Athlete of the Year in 2005.

She was raised on the Skwah First Nation territory in Chilliwack and in the urban setting of Vancouver. and completed her bachelor's degree (BKin - Sport Management) at the University of British Columbia and master's degree (MBA) at Simon Fraser University. Since her retirement from Ultimate in 2008, Lara has continued to be an active advocate for Indigenous sport. Mussell Savage was inducted into the Chilliwack Sports Hall of Fame in 2016 for her achievements in and contributions to sport and is the first female and first Indigenous inductee. Mussell Savage currently resides in Chilliwack, BC, on the Skwah Reserve, with her husband, Kirk Savage (also a World Champion Ultimate athlete and hall of famer), and their two children.

== Early life and education ==
Mussell Savage was raised in the Skwah First Nation of Stόlō territory in Chilliwack, British Columbia. As a youth athlete she competed in several sports such as track & field, golf, basketball, curling, gymnastics, and later, Ultimate. Lara graduated from the University of British Columbia as a Wesbrook Scholar with a degree in Kinesiology, Leisure & Sport Management (2001) and completed her MBA at Simon Fraser University (2019). Her father is Sxela':wtxw till, the late Chief Roy Mussell and her grandmother was the first female Chief of Skwah First Nation, elected in 1959. Her cousin, Kaila Mussell, was the first professional female saddle-bronc rider in North America.

== Career ==
Mussell Savage was first exposed to Ultimate in 1992, when she was in her senior year of high school. During university, Mussell Savage and her classmates entered a team in the Vancouver Ultimate League and she later went on the play for the University of British Columbia's varsity-club team. Serving as team captain, Mussell Savage helped lead the team to three National University Ultimate Championship titles. In 1997, Mussell Savage joined Vancouver based touring team Goo (later known as Prime, then Traffic) that played in both American and Canadian tournaments. In 1998, her team went on to win the national championships, earning the chance to represent Canada at the World Ultimate Championships in Minnesota. She went on to help Canada achieve a bronze medal in 1998, and a gold medal in 2000. In 2004, as one of the national team captains, Mussell Savage lead the undefeated team to their second gold medal. She went on to win a bronze medal once more in 2008.

After her 2008 season Mussell Savage required neck surgery, which eventually ended her athletic career. Since retirement she continues to be involved with sport management. Career highlights include 2010 Winter Olympics in Vancouver, serving on the organizing committee (VANOC) as Project Manager for Aboriginal Sport and Youth. Mussell Savage has helped run the Air Canada PGA TOUR Championship in British Columbia, and has also been employed by the University of British Columbia in their athletics department. Since 2010, she has been a part of the Indigenous Sport, Physical Activity and Recreation Council (ISPARC) and was also Chef de Mission for the Team BC for the North American Indigenous Games (NAIG) for the 2014, 2017 and 2020 program and has become an ambassador for ViaSport's #LeveltheField campaign promoting gender equity in sport. Mussell Savage currently sits on the board of trustees for the BC Sports Hall of Fame and was featured in the Women in Sport Spotlight, ViaSport BC's series featuring inspirational female athletes, coaches, officials, volunteers, and leaders in British Columbia. In 2018, Mussell Savage became one of the featured athletes in the award-winning Indigenous Sport Gallery in the BC Sports Hall of Fame & Museum.

In 2022, Mussell Savage was invited to work with the Four Host First Nations, being the Lil'wat, Musqueam, Squamish, Tsleil-Waututh Nations, and the Canadian Olympic Committee and Canadian Paralympic Committee as part of the BC 2030 Feasibility Team to lead community engagement work on the prospective Indigenous-led bid for BC to host the 2030 Winter Games. While the bid ultimately did not go forward due to lack of provincial support, the Indigenous-led project was groundbreaking and presented a new way of approaching major Games hosting and conducting business within a spirit of reconciliation. In 2023, Mussell Savage was named one of the "23 Influential Canadian Women in Sport to Watch in 2023 (subscription required)."
