= Phyllis Bomberry =

Canadian softball player (1943–2019)

Phyllis "Yogi" Bomberry (1943 - January 3, 2019) was a Canadian softball catcher from southwestern Ontario. She competed nationally winning many Canadian Women's Softball Championships. Bomberry became the first female to win the Tom Longboat Award. She died on January 3, 2019.

== Early life ==
Phyllis Bomberry was born in 1943 in Ohsweken, Ontario. She was the second-oldest in a family of four brothers and two sisters from the First Nations of the Grand River Reserve, who are members of the Cayuga tribe, Wolf Clan. Growing up, Bomberry was involved in many sports in school such as hockey, football, volleyball, badminton and lacrosse. She traced her competitiveness back to having to compete with boys in her early life. Bomberry often caught baseballs for her brother and father, who were both amateur baseball players. She was involved with softball both on and off the reserve in house league programs. The nickname, "Yogi", after Yogi Berra, was given to her for her remarkable catching skills on the softball diamond. Her softball career lasted a total of 25 years from 1951 to 1976.

== Career ==
Bomberry started her softball career within the minor softball league in Caledonia where she played from the mid 1950s to 1963. In 1960 and 1962, she and her team, the Ohsweken Mohawks, earned back to back Intermediate B Provincial Softball Women's Union Championships. After her time with the Ohsweken Mohawks, she moved to Toronto to complete her high school education. Bomberry's talent was discovered and she was recruited to play for the Toronto Carpetland Senior A Team, which competed in the Ontario Senior Women's league. Bomberry was able to find a job in the Toronto area with the help of the Carpetland team. She worked in a factory at an assembly line, which allowed her to be present for the team's practices. In 1967 and 1968, Bomberry and her team won back to back senior Canadian Women's Softball Championships. In addition, Bomberry and her team won the gold medal at the Canada Games in 1969. Bomberry received the Top Batter award at the 1967 Canadian Women's Softball Championships. After her win in the 1969 Canada Games, she received Canadian All-Star Catcher and Most Valuable Player honours. Unfortunately, she was forced to end her playing career early, in 1976, due to a knee injury.

== Post-career ==
Bomberry lived the rest of her life on the Six Nations Reserve in Ohsweken, Ontario. Due to her knee injury, she was unable to compete further in sports; however she did enjoy watching sports on television and engaging in native crafts and artwork. Bomberry was chosen to carry the Olympic torch through Six Nations prior to the 2010 Winter Olympic Games.

== Awards ==
In 1969, Bomberry was the first female recipient of the Tom Longboat Award. The Tom Longboat Award (since 1951) is awarded to the most outstanding Canadian aboriginal athlete. In 2009, Bomberry was inducted into the Softball Canada Hall of Fame. In 2023 she was awarded the Order of Sport, marking her induction into Canada's Sports Hall of Fame.
