= Julia Jamieson =

Indigenous Canadian educator and teacher

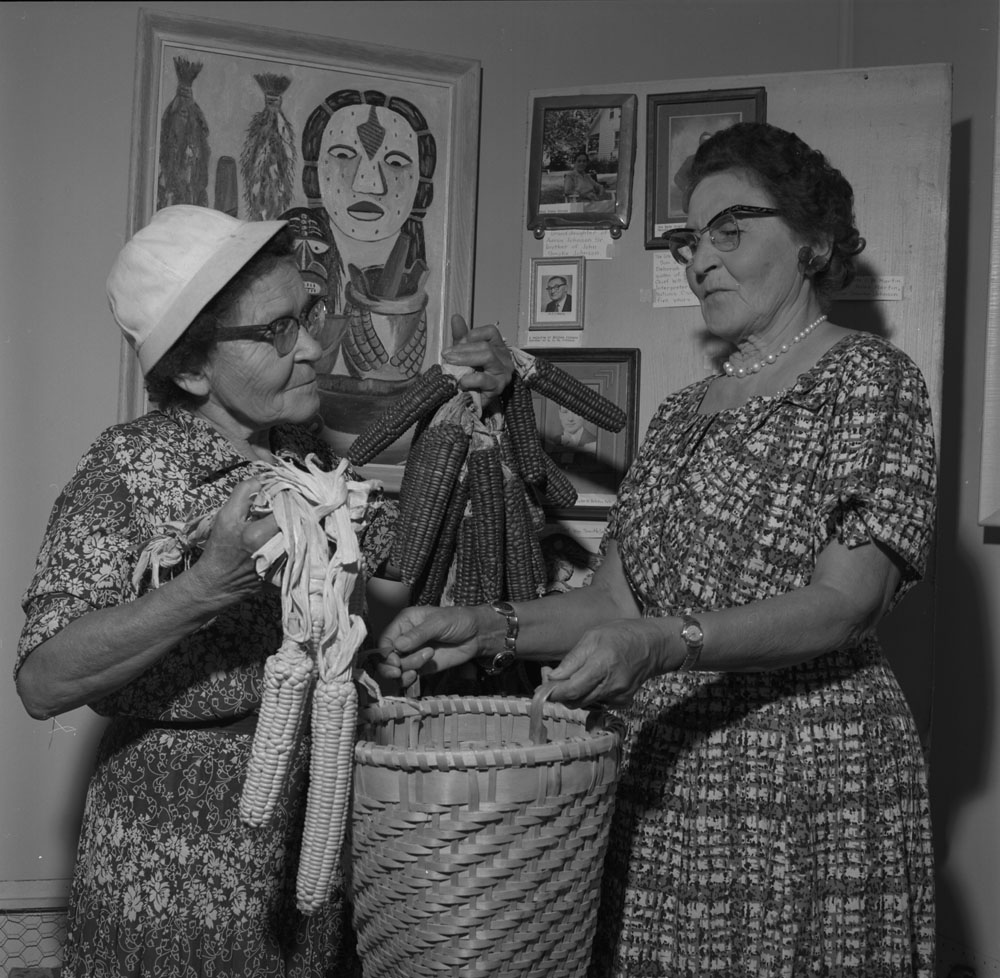
Julia and her sister Nora, 1961.

Julia L. Jamieson (1889–1975) was a member of the Six Nations of the Grand River in Canada.

Jamieson was born to Augustus Jamieson, a Cayuga teacher and member of the Six Nations School Board, and Emmeline Echo-Hill, a Mohawk and daughter of Chief Jacob Hill. Julia Jamieson was a scholar, author, and teacher in the Six Nations School Board for many years. She was a founding member of the Six Nations Teacher's Organization and President of the local Baptist Young People's Union. By 1966 she had retired.

Books authored by Jamieson include Echoes of the Past: A History of Education from the time of the Six Nations Settlement on the Banks of the Grand River in 1784 to 1924, and a history of the Six Nations Agricultural Society. She worked to preserve the Mohawk language, writing in the late 1950s a four-volume set of textbooks titled The Mohawk Language; the Jamieson orthography, one of several writing systems for the language, is based on a system used by 18th-century missionaries. She was also involved with the Six Nations Reserve Forest Theatre including a production based on the life of Pauline Johnson. She also created a museum dedicated to Pauline Johnson.

Her commitment to education was honoured by the naming of Jamieson Elementary School in Ohsweken after her and her three siblings, all teachers.
