= Gaylord Powless =

Gaylord Powless (1946–2001) was a Haudenosaunee lacrosse player from the Six Nations of the Grand River First Nation Indian reserve near Brantford, Ontario. His father Ross was also a highly regarded player. In 2017, Powless was awarded the Order of Sport, marking induction into Canada's Sports Hall of Fame.

Gaylord Powless was the husband of Patti Broker Powless. He was the child of Ross and Wilma (nee Bomberry) Powless. He was former husband to Laurie Powless (Michelle’s mother), father of Michelle (Dave Anderson), Christopher (Jess), and Gaylene (Steve Sowden). He was the grandfather of Taylor Anderson, David Ross Anderson and Rachel Anderson; Kahner Sowden and Kali Sowden. Wilma and Ross Powless had 14 children, of whom Gaylord was the oldest. His siblings were brother Gail (Mark Ayres) of Brantford, brother Gary of Six Nations, brother Audrey (Jim Bomberry) of Six Nations, Greg (Susan) of Brantford, Harry of Vancouver, Arlene (Daniel Martin) of Six Nations, Richard (Effie) of Ottawa, the late Victor, Darryl (Nansii) of Vancouver, Karren (Jerry Martin) of Six Nations, Anthony and Jeffrey, both of Brantford and Jacqueline (Ron Lynes) of Mount Pleasant. He was the son-in-law of Elva Broker and the late Jack Broker of Port Dover; brother-in-law of Leslie and Lena Broker of Oklahoma City, Phil and Dawn Poitras of Simcoe, Gerald and Dianne Broker of Delhi, Joe and Linda Misener of Port Dover.

Gaylord completed high school at the R.S McLaughlin Collegiate and Vocational Institute. He was often hailed as an intuitive and instinctive player of lacrosse. In 1968 he won the Tom Longboat Award as best First Nations athlete in Canada when he was 17. The same year he was awarded the National Lacrosse Association's All-Star Award. He was then recruited by the Oshawa Green Gaels junior lacrosse team as a centre and forward position, jersey number 15. In his first game with the Oshawa Green Gaels, he scored 3 goals and 5 assists in the first game. His performance on the field earned him the nickname "the Marvellous Mohawk". Then the Oshawa Green Gaels team won the Minto Cups from 1964 to 1967; he was chosen as most valuable player in the series in 1964 and 1967. Gaylord won the Ken Ross trophy for ability and sportsmanship in 1965 and 1966. Gaylord was selected for the first All-Star Team Centre in O.L.A Junior A Series in 1967. He went on to a long, successful career in professional and senior amateur lacrosse with teams in Detroit, Syracuse, New York, Montreal, Brantford, Coquitlam, British Columbia, and Brampton, Ontario as well as with the Six Nations team. Gaylord played on Canada's national winning team in Indian International Field Lacrosse Tournament at Expo 67 against the United States, coached by Ross Powless.

Powless was also a standout player for the Detroit Olympics of the National Lacrosse Association. He scored 63 goals in the 1968 season; the next highest on Detroit's roster was Elmer Tran with only 30 goals.

He and his father are the only father and son both elected to the Canadian Lacrosse Hall of Fame. Ross Powless was inducted in 1969 and Gaylord was in 1990. The Ohsweken, Ontario Arena is named for him. It was later renovated in 2005 to include separate gyms for elementary school children, teens, and adults.

A cousin, Delby Powless, (b. 1980), played attack at Herkimer CC and Rutgers, where he was an honourable mention All-American, and now plays the box game professionally.

After Gaylord retired, he coached minor lacrosse and hockey teams on the Six Nations Reserve where he lived. He continued to do so leading up to his death. Gaylord died July 28, 2001 from cancer.
