= Darren Zack =

Darren Zack (born 1960 in Garden River, Ontario, Canada), also known by his nickname "Z-MAN" is a fastpitch softball player. Zack is an Ojibwa softball player and he has set records at every level, pitching the most wins, strikeouts and consecutive scoreless innings, and capturing three gold medals at the Pan Am Games. Zack conducts pitching clinics throughout North America, encouraging community involvement in the sport.

Zack currently lives in the Garden River First Nation Reserve with his wife Charlotte and their children. Zack has 5 children, Sean Dolan, Jon Dolan, late William, Molli Zack and Darren Junior. Sean has 2 sons, Lewis and James and DarrenJr has a daughter and 4 sons. Nahla, Kovu, Leo, Kion and Rio. thus Darren has seven grandchildren. Zack's culture and spirituality is important to him, specifically the teachings of the tobacco.

Zack had a book released about him in 2010, called Z-Man Darren Zack, which chronicles his career.

== Early life ==
Zack was born during 1960 in Garden River, Ontario, Canada to John and Edith Zack and grew up on the Garden River First Nations Reserve near Sault Ste. Marie. He is a part of the Ojibwa tribe and remains a resident of the Garden River First Nation reserve. He has one sister Leslie and one brother Brenden. While he was young he was taught many sports, including fishing, hunting, football, and softball, the latter of which was a family tradition. Zack believes his family's love for Fastpitch and the fact they would throw the ball around with him as a child was instrumental to his career success. He has also commented that as a child the mentors in his life had encouraged him to go as far as he could with the sport. Specifically as a teenager, after consulting his grandfather with a dream about an eagle and playing for team Canada, his grandfather explained the eagle was the "highest bird" and symbolic of no one being able to break his records if he pursued fastpitch. In 2003 Darren Zack ran to be elected on to the council of the Garden River First Nations band. He along with 44 other candidates ran for 12 available spots.

== Athletic career ==
Zack got his start in the game as a 14-year-old with the Garden River Braves in 1974. He began his fastball career at first and third base, but yearned to pitch. When he was 19 years old his uncle did not show up for the game and he got his first chance to pitch. In 1983 the Boston Belmont Merchants came calling, and he played three seasons for teams in Boston and Connecticut, including Wellesley Trucking. In 1987 he joined Ashland ESS, and then had a stint with the Vancouver Magicians (1990-1992) of the Norwest League, while also spending two seasons pitching in New Zealand. Steve Frost, a sports reporter, said that Zack can routinely throw between 85 and 90 miles per hour.

Zack competed in the International Softball Congress (ISC) World Tournament on several occasions. His first appearance in the tournament was in Saskatoon, 1987. He won four ISC World Tournament Championships, that were 1993 and 1995 with the Toronto Gators, 1998 with the Tamper Smokers, and 2000 with Decatur Pride. He has set records such as the second-best record for all-time consecutive game wins and third in ISC World Tournament victories. In addition, he was named to the ISC All-World Team nine times between the years of 1992 and 2004. A highlight of his career was pitching 150 strikeouts over the course of 69.66 consecutive scoreless innings and winning 10 games at the 1995 ISC World Tournament in Iowa.

Zack played for the Canada national team from 1991 to 2004. He has won several medals, including gold medals at the Pan-American Games and a silver medal at the 1996 World Softball Championships. He won two consecutive gold medals at the Pan American games in 1991 1995. He was also the Canadian champion in 1991, 1993 and in 1995. Zack has also played for several Canadian Native Fastball Championships (CNFC) teams including Garden River, Horse Lake Thunder, Sapotaweyak, and Invermere A's.

In 2002 Zack was inducted into Sault Ste. Marie Sports Hall of Fame. Usually, there is a three-year waiting period after an athlete retires to be inducted, but based on Zack's success and ability to give Sault Ste. Marie National exposure, this waiting period was waived.

Zack picked up a championship at the World Senior Men's Fastball Tournament in 2002, and a 3rd-place finish in 2006. In 2010, Zack was playing alongside his son Darren Zack Jr. with the Palermo Athletics, a Kitchener area club. Zack has won 2 Ontario Masters Championships with the Toronto Gators and was named Top Pitcher in 2013. Zack has also won the ISC Legends World Championship twice with the Cobourg Force and was named MV Pitcher in 2010 and 2012. Additionally, Darren has competed in two NAFA Masters World Series, picking up one championship and has also competed at 3 ASA Masters Championships.

== Honours and awards ==
=== Records ===
- third all-time in tournament wins (54 wins; 29 shutouts)
- second in most victories in a single ISC tournament (10; 1993)
- second best all-time consecutive wins in ISC competition
- ISC tournament record for consecutive innings without allowing a run (10 games; 69 2/3)

=== Awards ===
- Outstanding Pitcher, Vancouver Magicians (1992)
- All-World Player, Vancouver Magicians (1992)
- Outstanding Pitcher, Toronto Gators (1993)
- All-World Player, Toronto Gators (1993)
- Outstanding Pitcher, Toronto Gators (1995)
- All-World Player, Toronto Gators (1995)
- H.P. Broughton Award (1995)
- All-World Player, Toronto Gators (1996)
- National Aboriginal Achievement Award (1997, for his career in sport)
- All-World Player, Toronto Gators (1998)
- Tom Longboat Award for Canada's most outstanding male aboriginal athlete (1999)
- Outstanding Pitcher, Decatur Pride (2000)
- Sault Ste. Marie Sports Hall of Fame (2002)
- All-World Player, County Materials (2003)
- All-World Player, County Materials (2004)
- Sault's Walk of Fame (2007)
- Softball Canada Hall of Fame (2009)
- ISC Hall of Fame (2010)
- MV Pitcher Ontario Masters Fastball (2010, 2012)
- ASA First Team All American
- Top Pitcher Ontario Masters Fastball (2013)
- Ontario Masters Fastball Hall of Fame (2014)

=== Medals ===
- 1991 Pan-American Games (gold)
- 1992 ISF World Championships (gold)
- 1993 ISC World Tournament (gold; Toronto Gators)
- 1995 ISC World Tournament (gold; Toronto Gators)
- 1995 Pan-American Games (gold)
- 1996 ISF World Championships (silver)
- 1998 ISC World Tournament (gold; Tampa Smokers)
- 1999 Pan-American Games (gold)
- 2000 ISC World Tournament (gold; Decantur Pride)
- 2004 ISF World Championships (silver)
- 2013 World Masters Games (gold)
