= Carole Polchies =

First Nation athlete

Carole Polchies was born in Woodstock First Nation, New Brunswick. She is a Canadian first nations woman known for her involvement in sports including softball, canoeing, horseshoes and tennis. Later she became involved in organizing sport competitions including the Indian Summer Games, which were first hosted in 1997.

== Personal life ==
Polchies is the daughter of Peter Lewis and Minnie Dedham and has nine siblings. Polchies has another brother Reggie Paul who also won a Tom Longboat Award in 1957 for baseball.

Although Polchies was busy with sports and taking care of her children she also had an interest in writing. Polchies worked at the Bugle where she eventually became an editor, and wrote for a monthly paper called "Agenutemangen". During her time at Bugle she became the first editor of "Agenutemangen". The paper was based out of Woodstock First Nation; while working there she specialized in recognizing Aboriginal Athletes in the local area.

Following Polchies previous experience in sport she later took a different path. In 1999, she campaigned for Chief. Polchies made an appearance in the Woodstock elections but lost to Jeffery Tomah. Polchies was up against Jeffrey Tomah, Eric Paul, and Brian Polchies. Tomah had 63 ballots, Paul had 59, Polchies had 46 ballots.

== Sports career ==
Polchies is known for her participation in sports including softball, canoeing, horseshoes and tennis. In 1978 she was a national Tom Longboat Awards recipient for her involvement in sport. Polchies' brother, Reginald Paul, had also been a recipient of the Tom Longboat Award in 1957. Polchies was an active athlete until the age of 42. Drawing on Polchies' previous sports background she helped the Woodstock community organize the Indian Summer Games. Unfortunately the Indian Summer Games have come to an end in New Brunswick. These games included participants from all over but mostly Listuguj Mi'gamaq First Nations.
