= Patrick Haas =

Austrian footballer

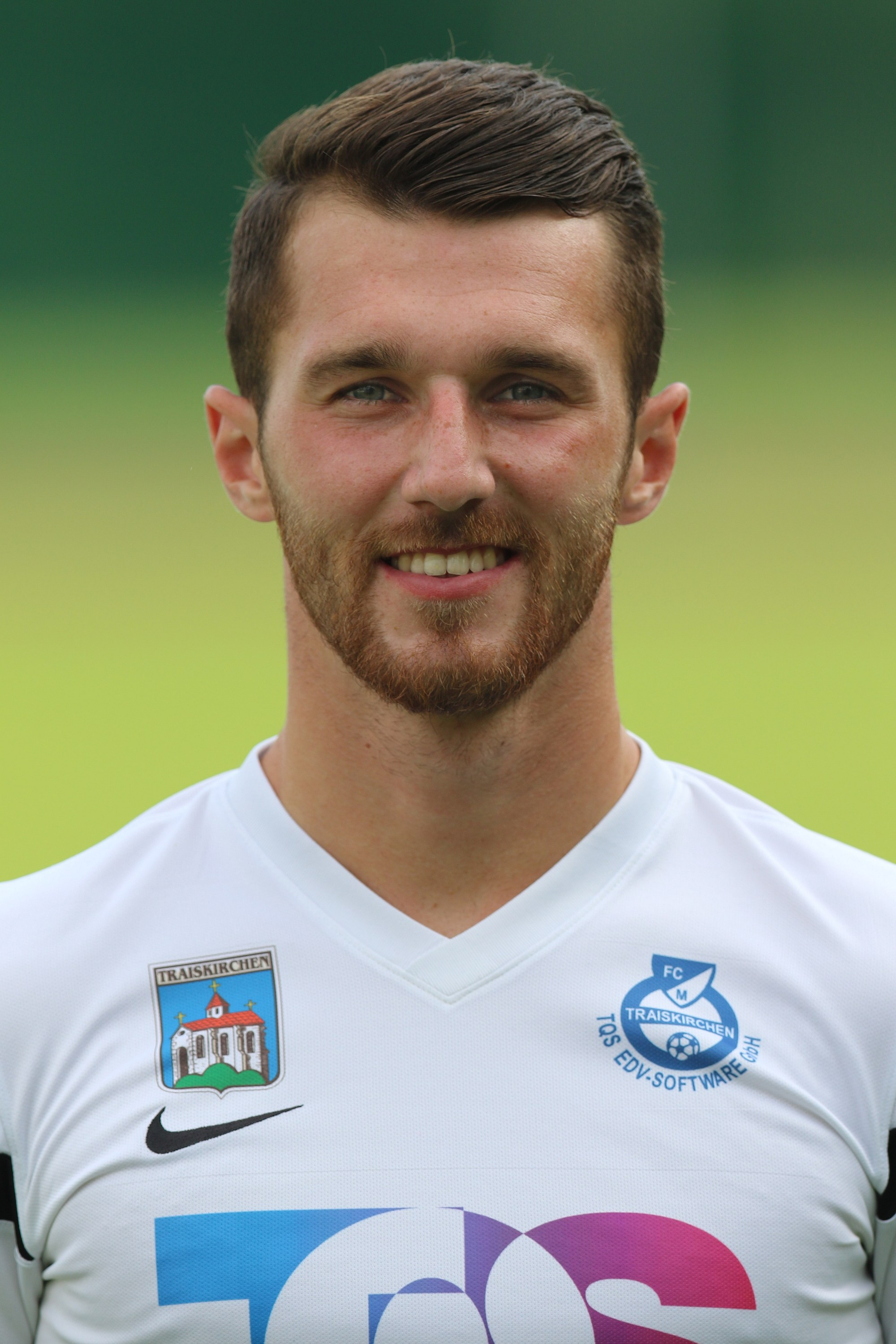
- Haas in 2016

Personal information
- Date of birth: 1 May 1993 (age 33)
- Place of birth: Wien, Austria
- Height: 1.75 m (5 ft 9 in)
- Position: Midfielder

Team information
- Current team: FCM Traiskirchen
- Number: 7

Youth career
- 1999–2002: SV Donau
- 2002: First Vienna
- 2002–2004: SV Donau
- 2004–2006: Austria Wien
- 2006–2010: Rapid Wien

Senior career*
Years	Team	Apps	(Gls)
2010–2013	Rapid Wien II	17	(0)
2012	→ SV Horn (loan)	10	(0)
2013	→ SC Ostbahn XI (loan)	13	(3)
2013–2016	Floridsdorfer AC	51	(4)
2016–2018	FCM Traiskirchen	57	(17)
2018–2019	SV Stripfing		
2020	SV Leobendorf	2	(0)
2020–	FCM Traiskirchen	55	(21)

International career
2010	Austria U18	2	(0)
2011	Austria U19	1	(0)
- * Club domestic league appearances and goals as of 19:27, 27 March 2023 (UTC)

Patrick Haas (born 1 May 1993) is an Austrian footballer who currently plays as a midfielder for FCM Traiskirchen.

== Career ==
=== SV Leobendorf ===
In December 2019 it was confirmed, that Haas would join SV Leobendorf on 1 January 2020.
