= Emily General =

Emily C. General (1908–1991) was a citizen of the Six Nations of the Grand River reserve in Canada. Born to Alexander General, a Cayuga, and Sophia Jones, who was Mohawk, she was a leader in the community, particularly through her career in education. Prior to becoming a teacher, General fought the RCMP's forced removal of twenty-one children from the community first to the Mohawk Institute Residential School and then to Chapleau Residential School, located 900 kilometres away from their community.

== Early years ==
She entered the Hamilton Normal School in 1925 and graduated in 1926. Shortly after she began working for the Six Nations School Board. She was fluent in Mohawk and Cayuga, involved in the Six Nations Agricultural Society, and participated in and likely led a delegation to England to fight for sovereignty for the Six Nations of the Grand River and to gain control of the funds paternalistically administered by the Canadian government.

== Career ==
General worked as a teacher in the Six Nations School Board but lost her job because of her participation in the delegation and again when she refused to participate in an oath of allegiance to the Crown. Following her dismissal, General founded the Six Nations Reserve Forest Pageant an annual theatrical tradition which continues to this day, though not without difficulties.

== Politics ==
General was very politically active, including as a President of the Indian Defense League of America, an organization which continues to this day with activities such as an annual border crossing between the United States of America and Canada to fight for the continued recognition of their rights under the Jay Treaty.

== Legacy ==
Emily C General Elementary School was named in her honour.
