= Aboriginal Sport Circle =

Canadian not-for-profit organization

- Formation: 1995
- Type: Non-profit
- Region served: Canada
- Website: www.aboriginalsportcircle.ca

The Aboriginal Sport Circle (ASC) is a not-for-profit organization that was founded in 1995. It is designated as Canada's governing body and voice for Aboriginal sport throughout the country. The ASC brings together the athletic interests of First Nations, Inuit, and Metis communities, to increase and promote physical health among indigenous populations. The ASC also gives out the national Tom Longboat Award to the outstanding male and female Aboriginal athlete in Canada each year.

== History ==
The ASC was initially established through a national consensus-building process to increase sport opportunities for Aboriginal communities. More recently, an interest in increasing access to sport and recreation within these populations has expanded to also include physical activity. The ASC acts as a representative of multiple individual sport bodies representing Canada's 10 provinces, and 3 territories. Members of the ASC include but are not limited to: Aboriginal Sport & Wellness Council of Ontario, Federations of Sovereign Indigenous Nations, and the Yukon Aboriginal Sport Circle. The ASC is operated by a board of directors including President, Lynn Lavallée, and 6 director representatives.

== Mission ==
The not-for-profit organization's mission statement is to “support the health and well-being of Aboriginal people and communities through participation in sport, physical activity and recreation”. The ASC's aim is to provide a voice for Aboriginal sport, build culturally appropriate programs that support Aboriginal people, oversee the development of national programs that improve physical activity for Aboriginal peoples, and develop training for individuals to be successful leaders within the sport environment.

== Focus ==
The ASC's focus as an organization includes leadership, and management. The ASC encourages leadership by aiming to attract volunteers, staff and instructors that share the mission and vision of the ASC to educate participants and support them through their sporting experience. Furthermore, the organization intends to support, communicate, and collaborate with management to increase the administration's overall success. Through this, the ASC has the goal of having all participants, volunteers, coaches, and staff members live through the collective vision of the organization and the overall mission provided by the ASC for Aboriginal sport participants.

== Values and principles ==
The ASC has listed three values and principles that they aim at demonstrating: respect, accountability and unity. Their goal is to show respect by ensuring fairness to all individuals when decisions are made and accountability by being transparent in all decision making, trusting of all participants, and expressing honesty throughout all aspects of the organization. Finally, unity is intended to be displayed by the coming together of all members to create a united voice.

== Tom Longboat Award ==
In 1951 the Tom Longboat Award was established to recognize Canadian Aboriginal athletes for their involvement in physical activity. The ASC currently presents this award to two Canadian Aboriginal elite athletes (one female, and one male), who demonstrate outstanding athletic accomplishments and display sportsmanship during competition. This award is presented in memory of Tom Longboat, a member of the Onondaga Nation, who displayed outstanding athletic talent throughout his career. Longboat set world records for long-distance running and participated in many national marathon events including the Boston and Powderhall Marathons. He was a First Nations athlete who placed importance on the Aboriginal community. Tom Longboat award winners receive a $1500 bursary to support physical activity costs, a paid trip to Toronto to attend the Canada Sports Hall of Fame ceremony to accept the award, and a custom-made Tom Longboat plaque.

=== Tom Longboat Award Winners ===
Year	National Award Winner(s)
2019	Cameron Gayleard & Lyric Atchison
2018	Jocelyne Larocque & Michael Linklater
2017	James Lavallée & Joy Spear Chief-Morris
2009	Ammon Crowfoot & Brigette Lacquette

== Research ==
The ASC continues to expand research related to physical activity in Indigenous communities. In December, 2017, the ASC launched the National Aboriginal Research Agenda, to increase understanding of Aboriginal policies, and program development. This program was created to use research to aid the ASC in achieving their objectives. Former President of the ASC, Janice Forsyth stated “This is an important opportunity to advance Aboriginal interests in sport, physical activity, and physical education for the health and well-being of Aboriginal people and Aboriginal communities throughout Canada”.
