= Ross Powless =

Mohawk lacrosse player

- Born: Alexander Powless; September 29, 1926
- Died: May 26, 2003 (aged 76)

Alexander "Ross" Powless (September 29, 1926 – May 26, 2003) was a Mohawk lacrosse player from the Six Nations of the Grand River First Nation near Brantford, Ontario. Broadly, Ross was positioned as an ambassador for lacrosse and for native people. Powless is also considered one of the best lacrosse athletes in Canadian history and the father of modern lacrosse. His exceptional play has been credited with reviving interest in box lacrosse in the 1950s. He was the father of lacrosse player Gaylord Powless. He was awarded the Order of Sport, marking his induction into Canada's Sports Hall of Fame, in 2020/21 as a builder for lacrosse.

== Early life ==
Powless was born September 29, 1926 in Ohsweken on the Six Nations of the Grand River First Nation. He was the son of Chauncay and Jessie Powless. He spent five years as a student at the Mohawk Institute Residential School as a child and began playing lacrosse at 12 years of age as a way to reconnect with his Indigenous heritage.

== Playing career ==
He played with the Peterborough Timbermen when they won four consecutive Mann Cups from 1951 to 1954, during which time he lived for a while with his wife Wilma and son Gaylord in a tent at Fairy Lake, near Peterborough. He won the Mike Kelly Memorial Trophy for most valuable player in the series in 1953. In 1956, as player-coach for a Hamilton team, he won the league scoring championship and every Ontario Lacrosse Association trophy except for best goalie, for which he did not qualify. Following his playing career, Powless coached various All-Indian teams to three national titles, including leading the Rochester Chiefs to the Can-Am Lacrosse League title in 1969. He also coached a team featuring six of his sons to the championship at the North American Indian Lacrosse Tournament, which he later said was one of his biggest thrills. He twice won the Tom Longboat Award as Canada's outstanding First Nations athlete, and was inducted into the Canadian Lacrosse Hall of Fame in 1969. Ross is also a member of the Ontario Lacrosse Hall of Fame.

His last season as a player was in 1967 when he played for the Hagersville Warriors and in one game played in Whitby had the opportunity to play against his son Gaylord who was with the Oshawa Steelers. Ross and son Gaylord, are the only father and son inducted into the Canadian Lacrosse Hall of Fame. They are also both inducted to Canada's Sports Hall of Fame; Gaylord in the athlete category (2017), and Ross as a builder in lacrosse (2020).

== Coaching and leadership ==
Ross was a member of Local 18 of the Hamilton Carpenters Union and worked on the construction of the original Burlington Skyway Bridge in 1956, and was proud of the fact that his son Gary worked on the twinning bridge in 1986.

Ross was a player/coach with the Hamilton Lincoln Burners, and was involved with the formation of the Brantford Warriors.

He led the establishment of hockey and lacrosse leagues on the Six Nations reserve. Ross was also a community leader, serving as a band councillor for eight years and a band administrator for twelve years. His community service was instrumental in changing the political climate on the Six Nations reserve near Brantford, Ontario.

In the late 1960s and 1970s, he coached the Brantford Warriors lacrosse team, which featured four of his sons, Gaylord, Gary, Harry and Greg. The team won the Canadian Senior B championship in 1968. Ross also organized the Iroquois Nations Cup Tournament in the 1960s and 70s. In 1997, he received the volunteer service award of the Ontario Municipal Recreation Association.

== Personal life ==
In later years, Ross was a building inspector on the Six Nations Reserve outside of Brantford, and he enjoyed spending time hunting with his dogs Lady and George. Ross was also an excellent pool player, gardener, and joke teller.

Ross was the husband of Margaret Wilma Powless (Bomberry). Ross and Wilma were married for 55 years and raised 14 children. They also had 27 grandchildren and seven great-grandchildren. He was the father of Gaylord (deceased), Gail, Gary (deceased), Audrey, Greg (deceased), Harry, Arlene, Richard, Victor (deceased) Darryl, Karen, Tony, Jeff (deceased) and Jacqui.
