= Bev Beaver =

Canadian athlete (1947–2025)

Beverly Beaver (1947 – 19 April 2025) was a Canadian Mohawk athlete from the Six Nations Reserve in Ontario, Canada, known for her performance in fastball, hockey, and bowling. Beaver was born to Reg and Norma Henhawk and had seven siblings, Sidney Henhawk, Frank Henhawk, Sandra Henhawk, Wanda Henhawk, Charlene Nuttycombe, Toni Johnson, and Justine Bomberry. Beaver competed as a professional athlete from 1961 to 1994. She is known to have developed her athletic skills by playing sports with boys throughout her childhood, even becoming a prominent player on a boy's bantam hockey team at age 13. Beaver played exclusively on Native fastball teams; however, she played on non-Native teams in other sports. Throughout her career she earned awards such as the Regional Tom Longboat Award for Southern Ontario (1967) and the National Tom Longboat Award (1980). Beaver is credited with earning other awards for performance in fastball, hockey, and bowling. Some of her hockey artifacts are in the Hockey Hall of Fame, in its diversity exhibit.

== Softball ==
Beaver was a pitcher in softball/fastball for the All-Native team the Ohsweken Mohawks. She is credited as being a star player, excelling in both pitching and batting. In 1980, the Mohawks competed in the National Indian Activities Association women's softball tournament in Anadarko, Oklahoma. Beaver was pitcher for the Mohawks during the tournament, the team won five straight victories and first place in the tournament. Despite being offered a position on a non-Native team, the Toronto Carpetland, Beaver competed exclusively on All-Native softball teams. She commended the Ohsweken Mohawks for being an All-Native team, remarking that the team exemplified the competitive spirit of sport without athletes from outside of their community.

== Hockey ==
Beaver only competed within the Euro-Canadian sport system throughout her nearly thirty-year career as a professional hockey player, playing for the Burlington Gazettes and the Brantford Lady Blues. In 1990, the Brantford Lady Blues went on to win the Ontario Ladies Hockey League Championships; both Beaver and her daughter were members of this team.

She scored the series-winning goal when Burlington won the 1983 Abby Hoffman Cup at Hockey Canada's National Championships. She also scored a goal in the national quarterfinals and two goals in the semifinals.

== Bowling ==
Beaver is noted for maintaining a high female average and high triple score for all but one year from 1969 to 1974. She also earned a "high triple score" in Ontario Indian Bowling Championship in 1973.

== Death ==
Beaver died on 19 April 2025, at the age of 77.

== Awards ==
Beaver is credited with earning many awards throughout her career as a professional athlete. As a softball player she won the most valuable player award eight times from 1962 through 1980. In 1979 she was awarded for being the best pitcher, top batter, and most valued player in the Canadian Native Championship in Kelowna, British Columbia. In hockey, she amassed five most valuable player awards and five top scorer awards between 1966 and 1980. Notably, Beaver was a recipient of both the regional and National Tom Longboat Awards. The Tom Longboat Awards are given to elite Indigenous Canadian athletes as recognition for achievement in sport. Beaver was awarded the Regional Tom Longboat Award in 1967 for Southern Ontario. In 1980, she was awarded the National Tom Longboat Award, after being nominated by Tom Longboat Jr. She was inducted into the Brantford and Area Sports Hall of Recognition in 1995. The Hockey Hall of Fame included her hockey jerseys and badges in its diversity exhibit in 2018, in recognition of her outstanding competitive hockey career spanning forty years.
