= Iskwao Creek =

River in Saskatchewan, Canada

Iskwao Creek Squaw Creek
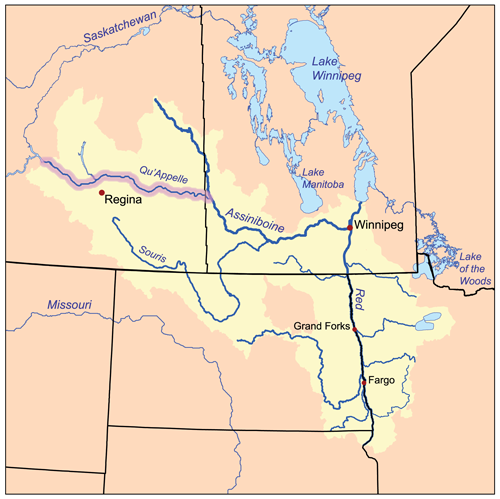
- The Red River drainage basin, with the Qu'Appelle River highlighted

- Location of the river's mouth in Saskatchewan Iskwao Creek (Canada)
- Etymology: Cree for 'woman'

Location
- Country: Canada
- Province: Saskatchewan

Physical characteristics
- Source
  - location: RM of Willner No. 253, Saskatchewan
  - coordinates: 51.2855°N 106.0071°W
- Mouth: Qu'Appelle River
  - location: RM of Huron No. 223, Saskatchewan
  - coordinates: 50.8797°N 106.0141°W
  - elevation: 520 m (1,710 ft)

Basin features
- River system: Red River
- Waterbodies: Davidson Reservoir; Iskwao Lake

Iskwao Creek, formerly Squaw Creek, is a river in the Canadian province of Saskatchewan. It begins just north of Davidson and flows south into the Qu'Appelle River downstream and east of Eyebrow Lake. Much of the river's course is through a deep-cut valley that was formed by glacial meltwaters near the end of the last ice age.

Davidson is the only community on the river. There are two reservoirs along its course and two highways cross it. In 1949–50 Enbridge Line 1 was built through the river's valley.

== Description ==
The valley that Iskwao Creek flows through was carved out near the end of the last ice age. As the Wisconsinan Glacier was retreating, its meltwaters created spillways. In this case, a re-entrant was created around the Allan Hills with ice lobes extending down into present-day Last Mountain Lake to the east and along the eastern side of the South Saskatchewan River to the west. At that time, though, glacial Lake Milden filled the South Saskatchewan River Valley. Arm River and Iskwao Creek drained this re-entrant with Arm River flowing into Last Mountain River and Iskwao Creek draining into the Qu'Appelle River. At that time, the South Saskatchewan River followed the course of the present-day Qu'Appelle River as it flowed east into Lake Agassiz.

Iskwao Creek begins just north of the town of Davidson in the Rural Municipality of Willner No. 253 where it flows east into the Rural Municipality of Arm River No. 252 and crosses Highways 653 and 747. It then flows south into the Davidson Reservoir on the east side of town. At the south end of the reservoir, the river exits at the dam and continues south crossing Highway 11. From Highway 11 it continues its southward travel through the valley for about 19 kilometres (12 mi) before emptying into Iskwao Lake. Shortly after Iskwao Creek exits Iskwao Lake, it crosses Highway 732 and then flows in a south-westerly direction. As it nears the Qu'Appelle River, it makes a sharp right-angle turn to the south-east and flows down into Qu'Appelle Valley through a coulee to join the Qu'Appelle River in the Rural Municipality of Huron No. 223.

== See also ==
- List of rivers of Saskatchewan
- Hudson Bay drainage basin
- List of place names in Canada of Indigenous origin
