= Saskatchewan Highway 367 =

Provincial highway in Saskatchewan, Canada

Highway 367

Route information
- Maintained by Ministry of Highways and Infrastructure
- Length: 23.8 km (14.8 mi)

Major junctions
- East end: Highway 42 in Eyebrow
- West end: Highway 19 in Bridgeford

Location
- Country: Canada
- Province: Saskatchewan
- Rural municipalities: Eyebrow, Huron, Maple Bush

Highway system
- Provincial highways in Saskatchewan
← Highway 365	→ Highway 368

Highway 367 is a provincial highway in the Canadian province of Saskatchewan. It runs from Highway 42 in Eyebrow to Highway 19 in Bridgeford via the village of Tugaske, where it intersects with Highway 627. It is about 24 kilometres (15 mi) long.

== Route description ==
Hwy 367 begins in the Rural Municipality of Huron No. 223 at an intersection with Hwy 19 in the hamlet of Bridgeford, directly on the border with the Rural Municipality of Maple Bush No. 224. It heads southeast into the RM of Huron No. 223, paralleling the Canadian Pacific Railway's Outlook subdivision on its way to cross a small creek (Ridge Creek) and pass through the village of Tugaske, traveling through the northern part of town along Pacific Avenue to have an intersection with Hwy 627. Continuing southeast through rural farmland for several kilometres, the highway enters the Rural Municipality of Eyebrow No. 193, coming to an end a couple kilometres later at an intersection with Hwy 42 on the northwestern edge of the village of Eyebrow. The entire length of Hwy 367 is a paved, two-lane highway.

== Major intersections ==
From west to east:

Rural municipality	Location	km	mi	Destinations	Notes
Maple Bush No. 224 / Huron No. 223 boundary	Bridgeford	0.0	0.0	Highway 19 – Central Butte, Elbow	Western terminus; provides access to Qu'Appelle River Dam, Gardiner Dam, and Lake Diefenbaker
Huron No. 223	Tugaske	12.6	7.8	Highway 627 – Craik, Darmody	
Eyebrow No. 193	Eyebrow	23.8	14.8	Highway 42 – Eyebrow, Central Butte	Eastern terminus
1.000 mi = 1.609 km; 1.000 km = 0.621 mi

== See also ==
- Transportation in Saskatchewan
- Roads in Saskatchewan
