= Graham Creek =

Graham Creek may refer to:

- Graham Creek (Alberta), a stream in Saskatchewan and Alberta
- Graham Creek (Sonoma County, California), a stream in California
- Graham Creek (Rogue River tributary), a stream in Oregon
- Graham Creek (Manitoba), a river in Saskatchewan and Manitoba
- Grahams Creek, Queensland, a rural locality in the Fraser Coast Region, Queensland, Australia
