= Qu'Appelle =

Qu'Appelle may refer to:

== Places ==
- Rural Municipality of North Qu'Appelle No. 187, Saskatchewan, Canada
- Fort Qu'Appelle, a town in Saskatchewan
- Rural Municipality of South Qu'Appelle No. 157, Saskatchewan, Canada
- Qu'Appelle, Saskatchewan, a town in Saskatchewan
- Qu'Appelle River, a river in Saskatchewan and Manitoba
- Qu'Appelle River Dam, a dam in Saskatchewan
- Qu'Appelle Lakes, a chain of lakes in Saskatchewan
- Diocese of Qu'Appelle, diocese of the Anglican Church of Canada
- Chateau Qu'Appelle, hotel

== Electoral districts ==
- Regina—Qu'Appelle, federal electoral district in Saskatchewan
- North Qu'Appelle, a former provincial electoral district in Saskatchewan
- South Qu'Appelle, a former provincial electoral district in Saskatchewan
- Qu'Appelle (territorial electoral district), a former territorial electoral district in the Northwest Territories, Canada

== Ships ==
- HMCS Qu'Appelle
- HMCS Qu'Appelle (H69), World War II River-class destroyer
