= Whitefish River (Saskatchewan) =

River in Saskatchewan, Canada

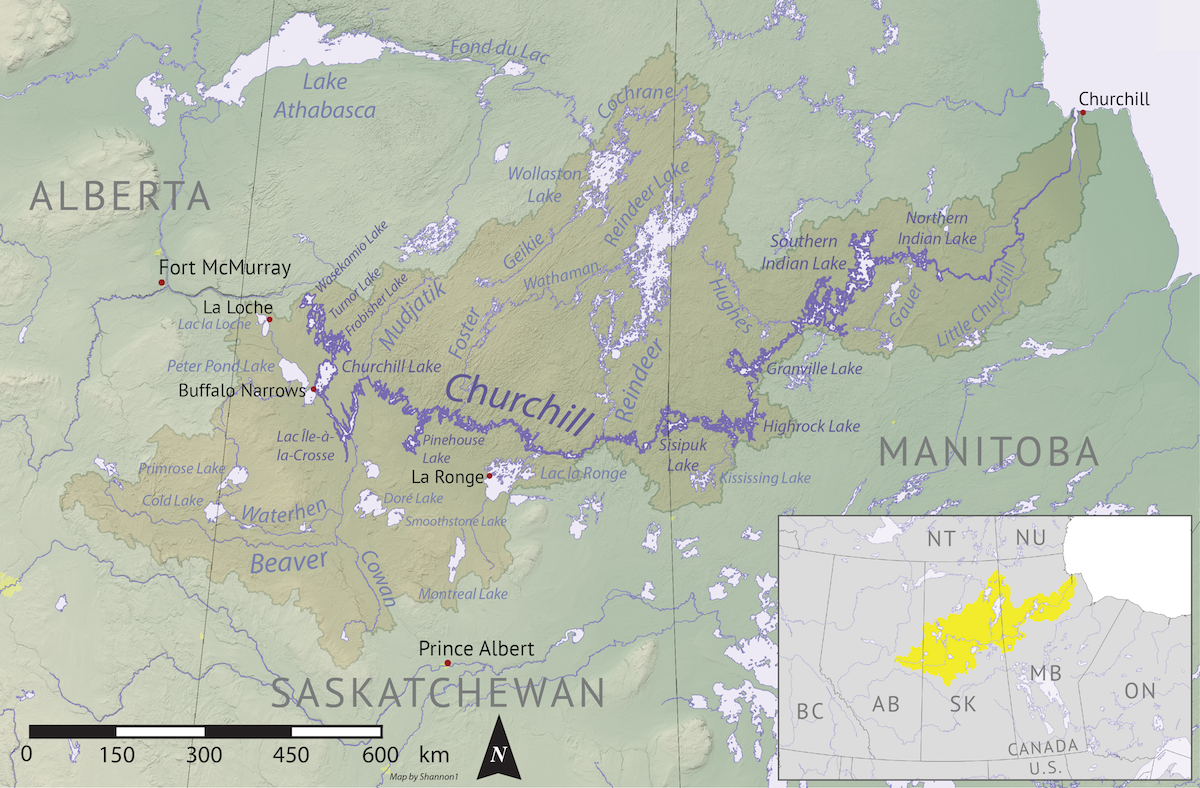
- Churchill River drainage basin

- Location of the mouth of the Whitefish River in Saskatchewan.

Location
- Country: Canada
- Province: Saskatchewan
- Census Division: No. 18

Physical characteristics
- Source: Unnamed lake
  - coordinates: 55°53′08″N 105°11′27″W
  - elevation: 464 m (1,522 ft)
- Mouth: Rowe Lake
  - coordinates: 55°42′56″N 105°21′31″W
  - elevation: 381 m (1,250 ft)
- Length: 24 km (15 mi)

Basin features
- River system: Churchill River drainage basin

The Whitefish River is a river in Census division No. 18 in northern Saskatchewan, Canada. It is in the Hudson Bay and Churchill River drainage basins.

== Course ==
The river begins at an unnamed lake at an elevation of 464 metres (1,522 ft) and flows south then northeast. It then heads southwest, and reaches its mouth at Rowe Lake at an elevation of 381 metres (1,250 ft), about 65 kilometres (40 mi) north of the community of La Ronge. The waters of Rowe Lake flow through Shadd Lake to Black Bear Island Lake on the Churchill River.

== See also ==
- List of rivers of Saskatchewan
- Hudson Bay drainage basin
