= Echo Creek =

River in Saskatchewan, Canada

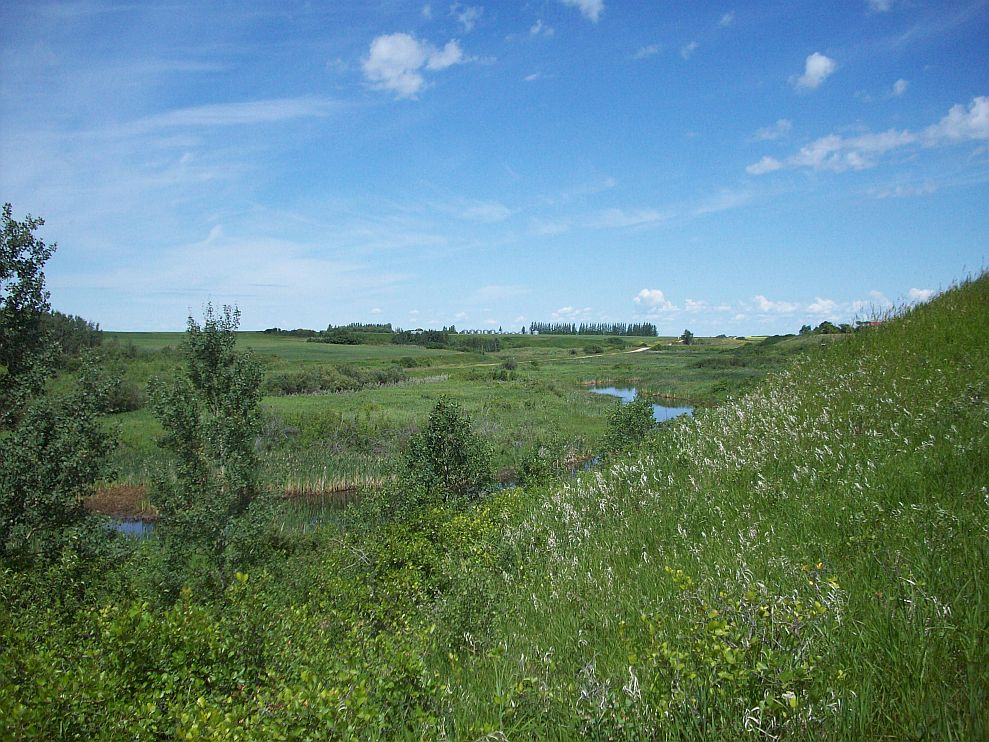
- Echo Creek

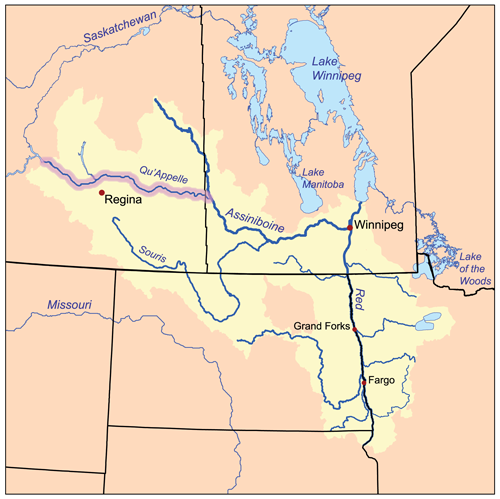
- The Red River drainage basin, with the Qu'Appelle River highlighted

- Location of the river's mouth in Saskatchewan Echo Creek (Canada)

Location
- Country: Canada
- Province: Saskatchewan

Physical characteristics
- Source
  - location: RM of South Qu'Appelle No. 157, Saskatchewan
  - coordinates: 50.5546°N 104.1677°W
- Mouth: Mission Lake
  - location: Fort Qu'Appelle, Saskatchewan
  - coordinates: 50.7611°N 103.7762°W

Basin features
- River system: Red River drainage basin
- Tributaries
  - right: Springbrook Creek

Echo Creek is a river in Saskatchewan, Canada. It is a tributary of the Qu'Appelle River that begins near the town of Balgonie and flows north-east into Mission Lake at Fort Qu'Appelle in the Qu'Appelle Valley. Mission Lake is one of the Fishing Lakes along the course of the Qu'Appelle River.

== River's course ==
Beginning in the RM of South Qu'Appelle No. 157 (just to the east of the source of west flowing Boggy Creek, another tributary of the Qu'Appelle River), Echo Creek flows first east across Highway 10 then dips south-east before heading north-east towards its mouth at Mission Lake. It crosses Highway 10 two more times farther downstream. Other highways it crosses include 35 and 620. As the river flows towards the Qu'Appelle Valley, it enters the RM of North Qu'Appelle No. 187 and then winds its way down into the Qu'Appelle Valley in a coulee that comes out at the town of Fort Qu'Appelle. It then runs east along the valley floor into Mission Lake.

== Fish species ==
Fish commonly found in the river include walleye, northern pike, and common carp.

== See also ==
- List of rivers of Saskatchewan
- Hudson Bay drainage basin
