= Tugaske, Saskatchewan =

Village in Saskatchewan, Canada

Coordinates: 50°52′30″N 106°17′12″W

Location of Tugaske in Saskatchewan

Tugaske (2016 population: 75) is a village in the Canadian province of Saskatchewan within the Rural Municipality of Huron No. 223 and Census Division No. 7. It is nicknamed Gateway to Lake Diefenbaker. It is near Eyebrow Lake, a prairie lake in the Qu'Appelle Valley. It was named after an eyebrow-shaped hill also in the Qu'Appelle Valley above Eyebrow Lake. The lake, which is 9 km long and 1 km wide, is a bird sanctuary and is near Highway 627.

Highway 367 and Highway 627 intersect in the village.

== History ==
Tugaske incorporated as a village on May 7, 1909.

== Climate ==
Climate data for Tugaske
Month	Jan	Feb	Mar	Apr	May	Jun	Jul	Aug	Sep	Oct	Nov	Dec	Year
Record high °C (°F)	12.8 (55.0)	15 (59)	21.7 (71.1)	32.8 (91.0)	38 (100)	41.5 (106.7)	41.1 (106.0)	42.2 (108.0)	39.4 (102.9)	32.2 (90.0)	23.9 (75.0)	18 (64)	42.2 (108.0)
Mean daily maximum °C (°F)	−9.9 (14.2)	−6.1 (21.0)	0.8 (33.4)	11 (52)	18.5 (65.3)	22.9 (73.2)	25.5 (77.9)	25.2 (77.4)	18.6 (65.5)	11.5 (52.7)	−0.1 (31.8)	−7.2 (19.0)	9.2 (48.6)
Daily mean °C (°F)	−15.2 (4.6)	−11.1 (12.0)	−4.4 (24.1)	4.6 (40.3)	11.6 (52.9)	16.2 (61.2)	18.5 (65.3)	17.9 (64.2)	11.7 (53.1)	5.1 (41.2)	−4.9 (23.2)	−12.3 (9.9)	3.1 (37.6)
Mean daily minimum °C (°F)	−20.4 (−4.7)	−16.1 (3.0)	−9.5 (14.9)	−1.8 (28.8)	4.5 (40.1)	9.4 (48.9)	11.4 (52.5)	10.5 (50.9)	4.7 (40.5)	−1.3 (29.7)	−9.8 (14.4)	−17.4 (0.7)	−3 (27)
Record low °C (°F)	−46.7 (−52.1)	−45 (−49)	−41.7 (−43.1)	−26.1 (−15.0)	−11.1 (12.0)	−5 (23)	0 (32)	−2.8 (27.0)	−13.9 (7.0)	−23.9 (−11.0)	−32.8 (−27.0)	−42 (−44)	−46.7 (−52.1)
Average precipitation mm (inches)	17.8 (0.70)	14.6 (0.57)	19.8 (0.78)	22.9 (0.90)	51.8 (2.04)	67.9 (2.67)	63.6 (2.50)	44.1 (1.74)	31.9 (1.26)	19.9 (0.78)	14.6 (0.57)	18.6 (0.73)	387.6 (15.26)
Source: Environment Canada

== Demographics ==
Population history (1981–2016)
Year	Pop.	±%
1981	175	—
1986	186	+6.3%
1991	157	−15.6%
1996	132	−15.9%
2001	116	−12.1%
2006	105	−9.5%
2011	92	−12.4%
2016	75	−18.5%
Source: Statistics Canada via Saskatchewan Bureau of Statistics

In the 2021 Census of Population conducted by Statistics Canada, Tugaske had a population of 79 living in 44 of its 53 total private dwellings, a change of 5.3% from its 2016 population of 75. With a land area of 0.75 km^{2} (0.29 sq mi), it had a population density of 105.3/km^{2} (272.8/sq mi) in 2021.

In the 2016 Census of Population, the Village of Tugaske recorded a population of 75 living in 47 of its 66 total private dwellings, a -22.7% change from its 2011 population of 92. With a land area of 0.76 km^{2} (0.29 sq mi), it had a population density of 98.7/km^{2} (255.6/sq mi) in 2016.
