= Bridgeford, Saskatchewan =

Coordinates: 50°56′19″N 106°25′19″W

Location of Bridgeford in Saskatchewan

Bridgeford is an unincorporated community in the Rural Municipality of Huron No. 223, Saskatchewan, at the intersection of Highway 19 and Highway 367. It is south of Lake Diefenbaker, the Qu'Appelle River Dam and Douglas Provincial Park.

== History ==
The community had a post office from 1909 to 1973. It was originally named West Bridgeford, after West Bridgford, Nottinghamshire, home town of early settlers. When the Canadian Pacific Railway built a station in the area, they shortened the name.
