= List of rivers of Saskatchewan =

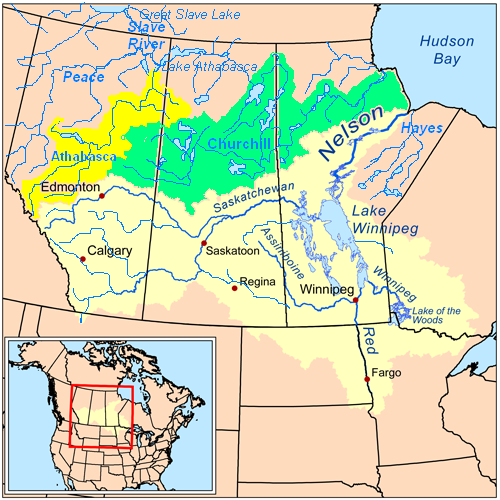
River basins in Alberta, Saskatchewan and Manitoba

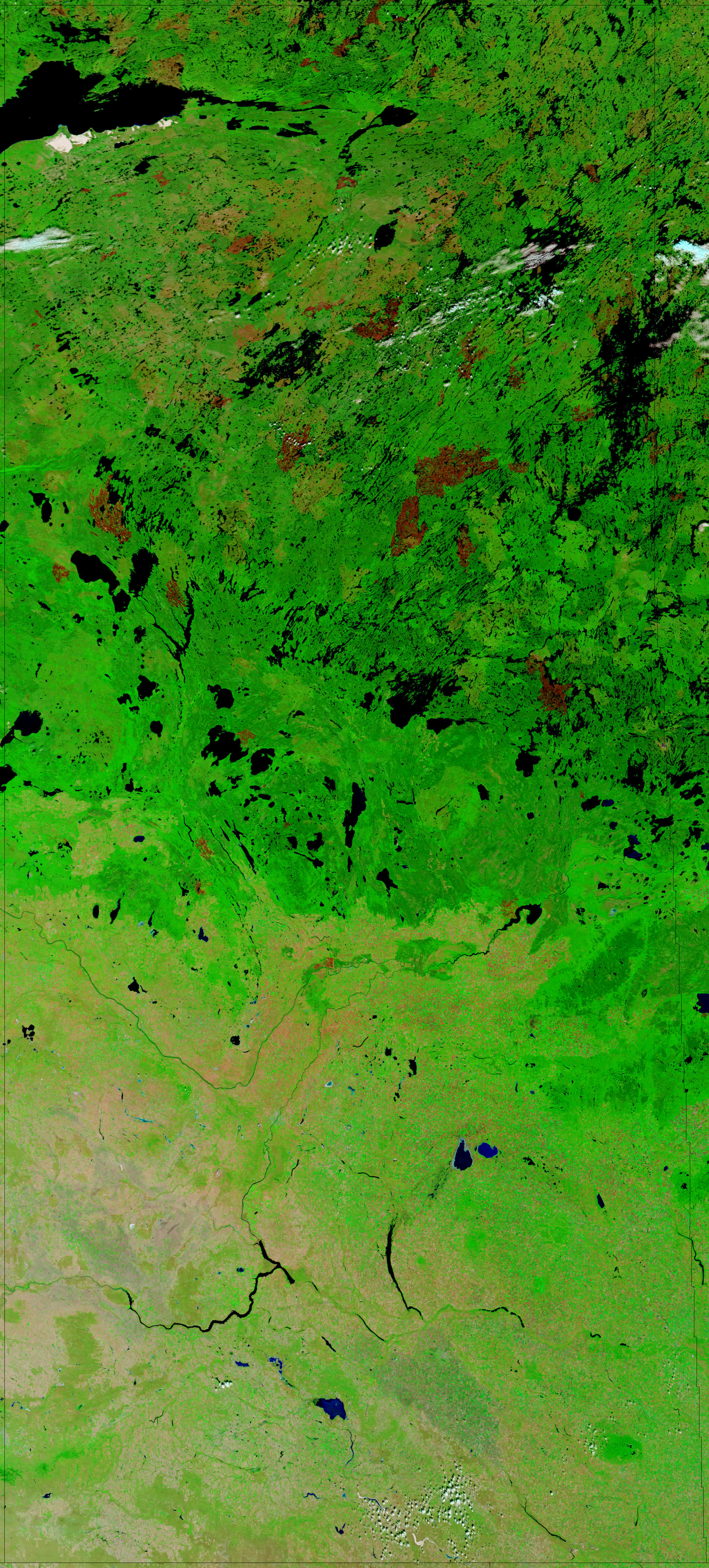
NASA image of Saskatchewan and a portion of Manitoba.

This is a list of rivers of Saskatchewan, a province of Canada.

The largest and most notable rivers are listed at the start, followed by rivers listed by drainage basin and then alphabetically.

== Principal river statistics ==
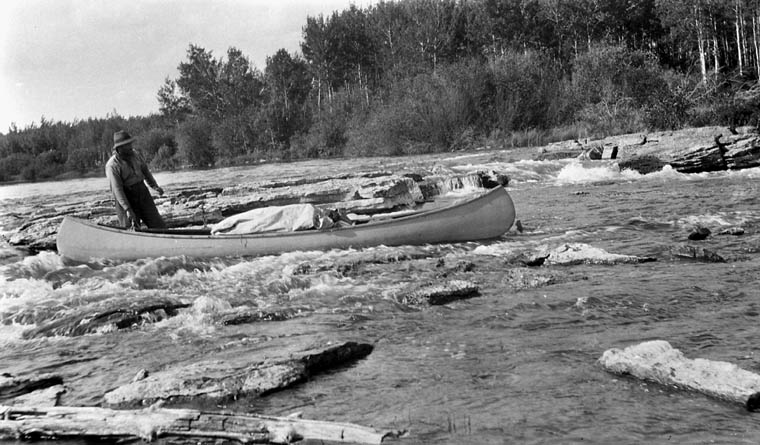
Navigating the rapids on the Sturgeon-Weir River

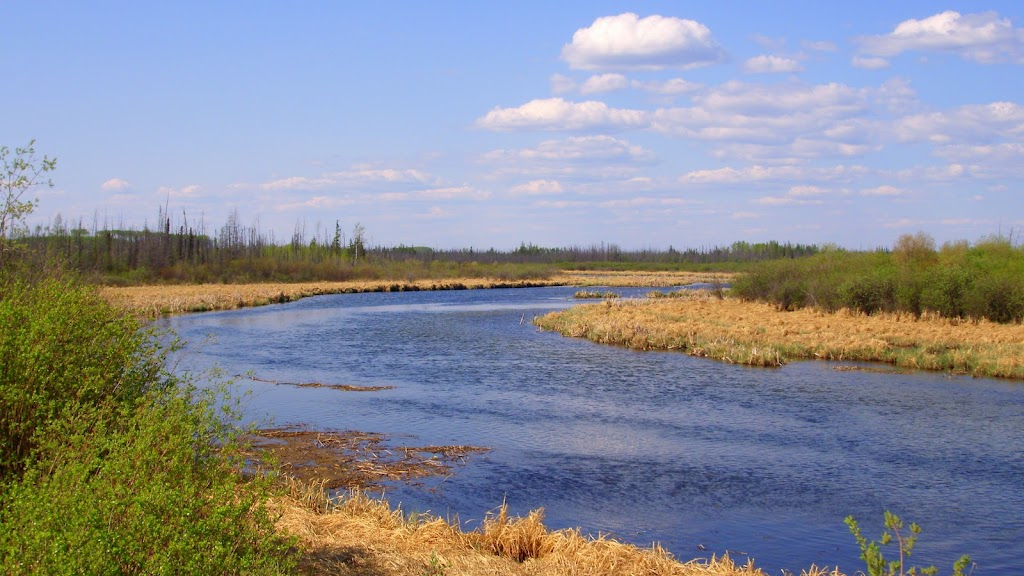
La Loche River

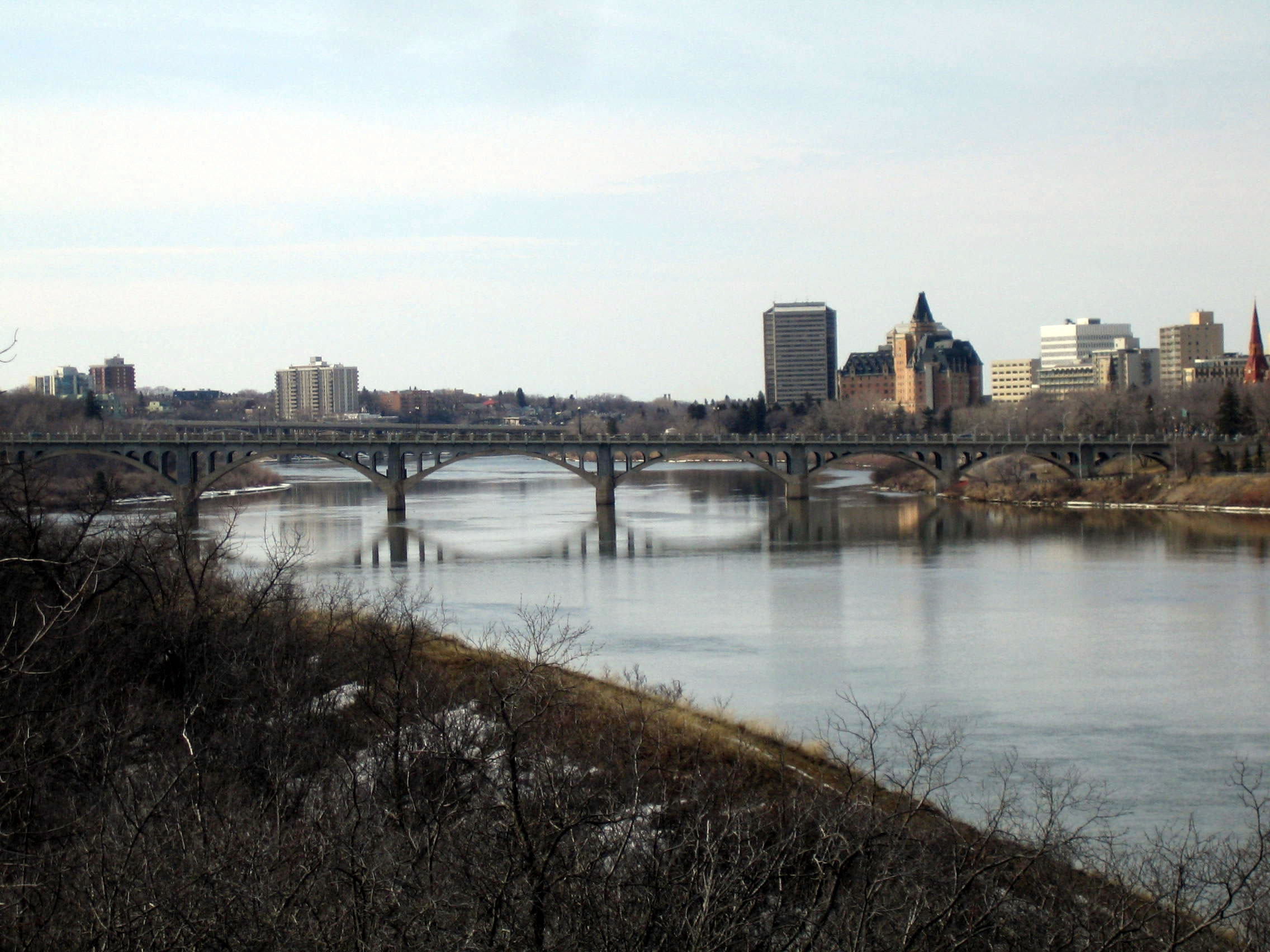
The University Bridge over the South Saskatchewan River at Saskatoon

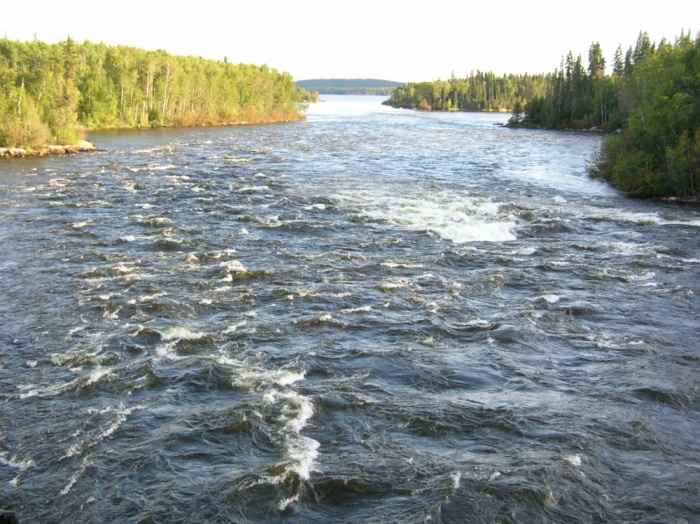
Otter rapids on the Churchill River

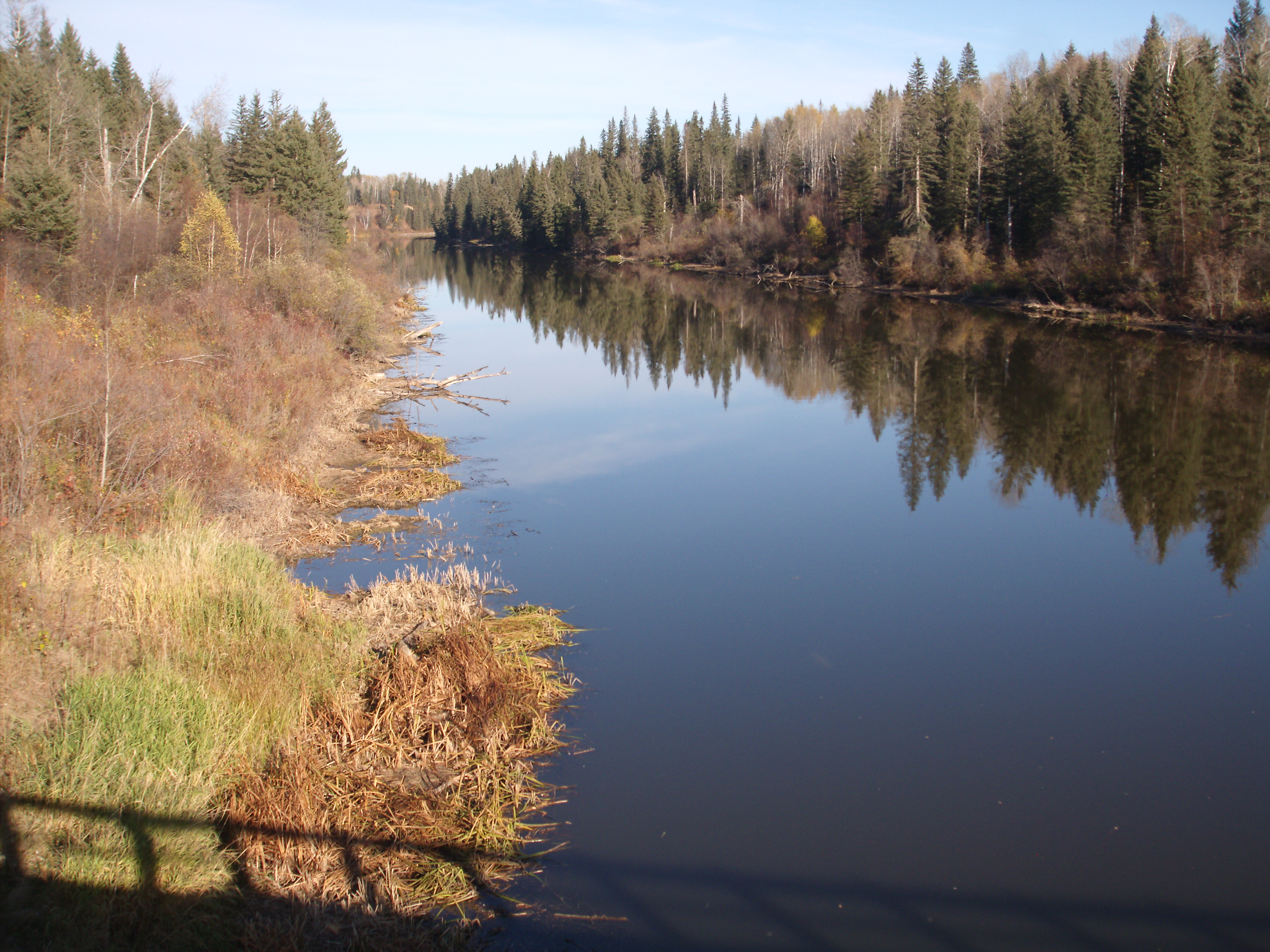
Beaver River north of Green Lake

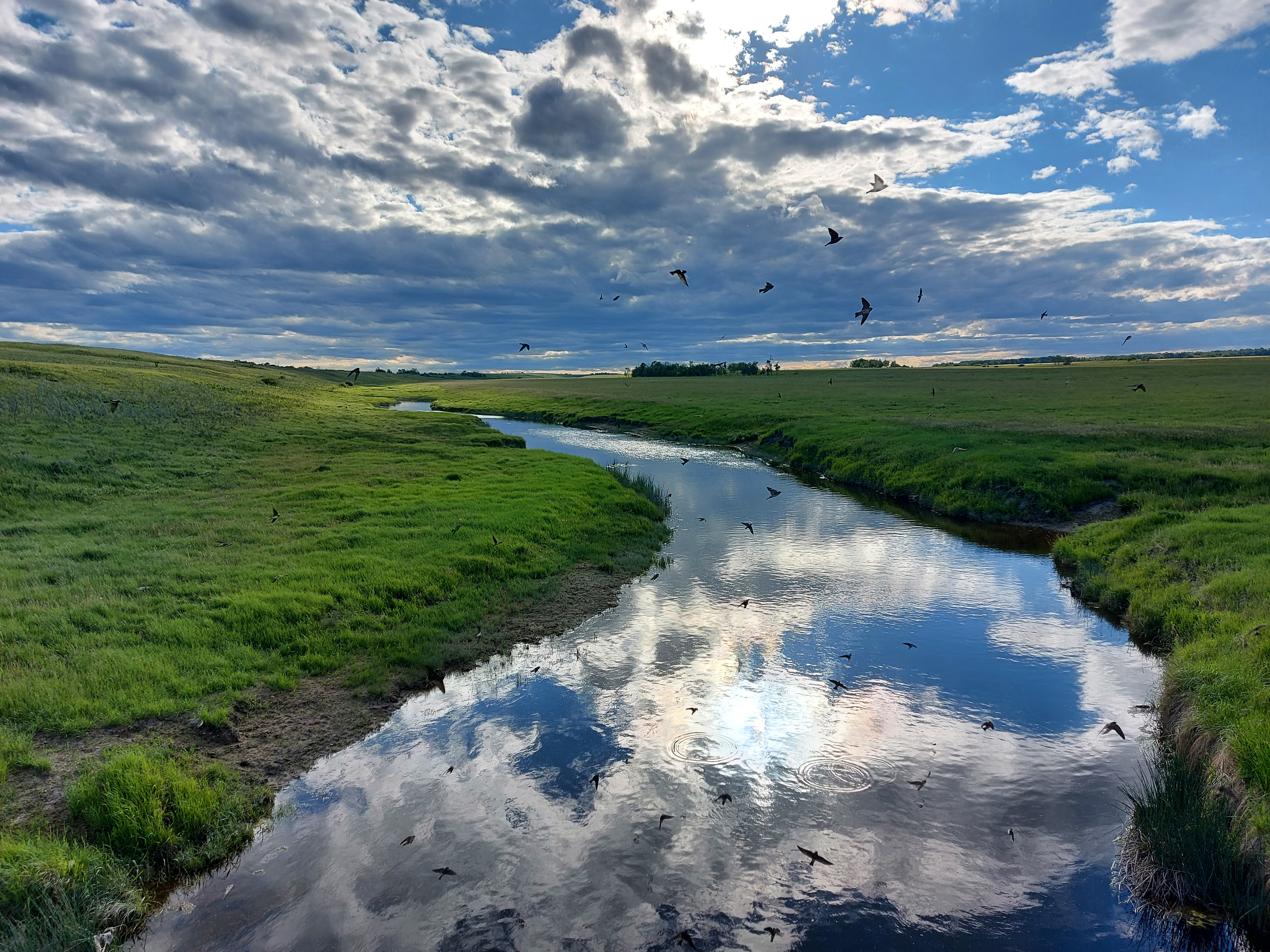
Moose Mountain Creek, near Carlyle

River	Total drainage area	Total length
North Saskatchewan	122,800 km^{2} (47,400 sq mi)	1,287 km (800 mi)
South Saskatchewan (to head of Bow River)	335,900 km^{2} (129,700 sq mi)	1,939 km (1,205 mi)
Saskatchewan River (to head of Bow River)	146,100 km^{2} (56,400 sq mi)	1,392 km (865 mi)
Churchill (to head of Churchill Lake)	281,300 km^{2} (108,600 sq mi)	1,609 km (1,000 mi)
Beaver (to outlet of Beaver Lake)	N/A	491 km (305 mi)
Battle River (to head of Pigeon Lake)	30,300 km^{2} (11,700 sq mi)	570 km (350 mi)
Fond du Lac River (from outlet of Wollaston Lake)	66,800 km^{2} (25,800 sq mi)	277 km (172 mi)

Source Statistics Canada

== Rivers by drainage basin ==
- Arctic Ocean drainage basin
  - Fond du Lac River
    - Geikie River
  - Cree River
    - Rapid River
  - Clearwater River
    - Graham Creek
  - Firebag River
  - Grease River
- Hudson Bay drainage basin
  - Churchill River
    - La Loche River
    - Dillon River
    - Beaver River
      - Waterhen River
        - Rusty Creek
        - Cold River
          - Martineau River
      - Cowan River
        - Big River
      - Meadow River
      - Makwa River
    - Haultain River
    - Smoothstone River
    - Foster River
    - Whitefish River
    - Reindeer River
      - Cochrane River
        - Geikie River
    - Nemei River
    - Rapid River
      - Montreal River
        - Waskesiu River
        - MacLennan River
      - Bow River
      - Nipekamew River
        - Nipekamew Creek
  - Assiniboine River
    - Lilian River
    - Whitesand River
      - Spirit Creek
      - Yorkton Creek
        - Crescent Creek
    - Qu'Appelle River
      - Iskwao Creek
      - Moose Jaw River
        - Avonlea Creek
        - Thunder Creek
      - Wascana Creek
      - Boggy Creek
      - Last Mountain Creek
        - Arm River
        - Lanigan Creek
      - Echo Creek
      - Pheasant Creek
    - Souris River
      - Long Creek
      - Moose Mountain Creek
      - Des Lacs River
      - Antler River
      - Gainsborough Creek
      - Graham Creek
      - Pipestone Creek (via Oak Lake and Plum Creek in Manitoba)
  - Saskatchewan River
    - Carrot River
      - Melfort Creek
      - Birch River
    - Pasquia River
      - Waskwei River
        - Whitepoplar Creek
          - Bainbridge River
    - Sturgeon-Weir River
      - Ballantyne River
      - Goose River
    - Grassberry River
    - Torch River
      - White Gull Creek
      - Stewart Creek
        - Caribou Creek
    - Mossy River
      - McDougal Creek
    - North Saskatchewan River
      - Monnery River
      - Turtlelake River
      - Jackfish River
      - Battle River
        - Cut Knife Creek
      - Eagle Creek
      - Spruce River
      - Sturgeon River
        - Shell River
    - South Saskatchewan River
      - Red Deer River
      - Swift Current Creek (flows into Lake Diefenbaker)
      - Brightwater Creek
      - Opimihaw Creek
      - Fish Creek
  - Overflowing River
  - Red Deer River
    - Barrier River
    - Greenwater Creek
    - Fir River
    - Etomami River
      - Pepaw River
      - Piwei River
    - Armit River
  - Swan River
  - Woody River
    - Midnight Creek
- Gulf of Mexico drainage basin
  - Battle Creek
  - Frenchman River
  - Rock Creek
  - Poplar River
  - Big Muddy Creek
- Old Wives Lake endorheic basin (considered part of the Gulf of Mexico drainage basin)
  - Wood River
    - Notukeu Creek
- Bigstick Lake endorheic basin
  - Maple Creek
- Manitou Lake endorheic basin
  - Eyehill Creek

== Alphabetical list of rivers ==
=== A ===
- Antler River
- Arm River
- Armit River
- Assiniboine River
- Avonlea Creek

=== B ===
- Bainbridge River
- Ballantyne River
- Barrier River
- Battle Creek
- Battle River
- Beaver River
- Big Muddy Creek
- Big River
- Birch River
- Boggy Creek
- Bow River
- Brightwater Creek

=== C ===
- Caribou Creek
- Carrot River
- Churchill River
- Clearwater River
- Cochrane River
- Cold River
- Cowan River
- Cree River
- Crescent Creek
- Cut Knife Creek

=== D ===
- Des Lacs River
- Dillon River

=== E ===
- Eagle Creek
- Echo Creek
- Etomami River
- Eyehill Creek

=== F ===
- Fir River
- Firebag River
- Fish Creek
- Fond du Lac River
- Foster River
- Frenchman River

=== G ===
- Gainsborough Creek
- Geikie River
- Goose River
- Graham Creek
- Graham Creek
- Grassberry River
- Grease River
- Greenwater Creek

=== H ===
- Haultain River

=== I ===
- Iskwao Creek

=== J ===
- Jackfish River

=== L ===
- La Loche River
- Last Mountain Creek
- Lanigan Creek
- Lilian River
- Long Creek

=== M ===
- MacLennan River
- Makwa River
- Maple Creek
- Martineau River
- McDougal Creek
- Meadow River
- Melfort Creek
- Midnight Creek
- Monnery River
- Montreal River
- Moose Jaw River
- Moose Mountain Creek
- Mossy River

=== N ===
- Nemei River
- Nipekamew Creek
- Nipekamew River
- North Saskatchewan River
- Notukeu Creek

=== O ===
- Opimihaw Creek
- Overflowing River

=== P ===
- Pepaw River
- Pasquia River
- Pheasant Creek
- Pipestone Creek
- Piwei River
- Poplar River

=== Q ===
- Qu'Appelle River

=== R ===
- Rapid River (Churchill River tributary)
- Rapid River (Cree River tributary)
- Red Deer River
- Red Deer River (Manitoba)
- Reindeer River
- Rock Creek
- Rusty Creek

=== S ===
- Saskatchewan River
- Shell River
- Smoothstone River
- Souris River
- South Saskatchewan River
- Spirit Creek
- Spruce River
- Stewart Creek
- Sturgeon River
- Sturgeon-Weir River
- Swan River
- Swift Current Creek

=== T ===
- Thunder Creek
- Torch River
- Turtlelake River

=== W ===
- Wascana Creek
- Waskesiu River
- Waskwei River
- Waterhen River
- White Gull Creek
- Whitefish River
- Whitesand River
- Wood River
- Woody River

=== Y ===
- Yorkton Creek

== See also ==
- List of lakes of Saskatchewan
- Geography of Saskatchewan
- List of rivers of Canada
- Rivers of the Americas
