= Wa-pii-moos-toosis 83A =

Indian reserve in Saskatchewan, Canada

Coordinates: 50°45′35″N 103°42′41″W

- Indian reserve
- Wa-pii-moos-toosis Indian Reserve No. 83A
- Location in Saskatchewan
- First Nation: Star Blanket
- Country: Canada
- Province: Saskatchewan

Area
  - Total: 22.9 ha (57 acres)
- Community Well-Being Index: 61

Wa-pii-moos-toosis 83A (Cree: ᐚᐱ ᒧᐢᒍᓯᐢ wâpi-moscosis) is an Indian reserve of the Star Blanket Cree Nation in Saskatchewan. In 2016, its Community Well-Being index was calculated at 61 of 100, compared to 58.4 for the average First Nations community and 77.5 for the average non-Indigenous community. The name of the locality means "White Calf".

It is located on the northern shore and near the east end of Mission Lake. It is adjacent to Lebret and was also the location of the Qu'Appelle Indian Residential School.

== See also ==
- List of Indian reserves in Saskatchewan
