= Boggy Creek (Saskatchewan) =

River in Saskatchewan, Canada

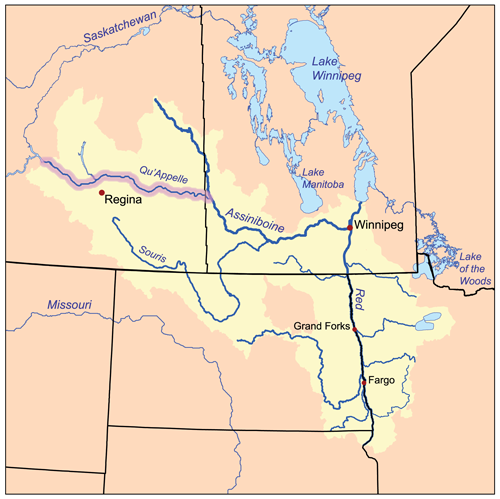
- The Red River drainage basin, with the Qu'Appelle River highlighted

- Location of the mouth in Saskatchewan Boggy Creek (Saskatchewan) (Canada)

Location
- Country: Canada
- Provinces: Saskatchewan

Physical characteristics
- Source
  - location: RM of South Qu'Appelle No. 157
  - coordinates: 50.5452°N 104.1965°W
- Mouth: Qu'Appelle River
  - location: RM of Lumsden No. 189
  - coordinates: 50.6633°N 104.8311°W
  - elevation: 497 m (1,631 ft)

Basin features
- River system: Red River drainage basin
- Tributaries
  - right: Seibel Creek

Boggy Creek is a river in the Canadian province of Saskatchewan. It begins north-east of Balgonie and heads in a westerly direction towards Pilot Butte and Regina before turning north-west where it meets the Qu'Appelle River east of Lumsden. Along the river's course there is a reservoir and several tourist attractions, including parks, golf courses, a race track, and a summer camp.

== Course ==
Boggy Creek begins in the Rural Municipality of South Qu'Appelle No. 157 about 10 kilometres (6.2 mi) north-east of Balgonie near Highway 10. The source of Echo Cteek, another Qu'Appelle River tributary, is a short distance to the east. From Boggy Creek's source, it heads west crossing Highway 364 before dropping south for about 1.6 km (1 mi). It then returns to its westerly flow skirting the northern edge of Pilot Butte. West of Pilot Butte is Murray Parkway Golf Course, Kings Park Speedway, and Tor Hill Golf Course. From Tor Hill Golf Course, Boggy Creek heads in a north-westerly direction crossing Highway 6 then Highway 11 before emptying into Condie Reservoir in Condie Nature Refuge. From the lake, the river carries on past Boggy Creek School heritage site, Flowing Springs Golf Greens, Dallas Valley Ranch Camp, and Happy Hollow Corn Maze before flowing into the Qu'Appelle River about 2 km (1.2 mi) down stream and east of Lumsden.

== Condie Nature Refuge ==
Condie Nature Refuge (50.5613°N 104.7153°W) is a provincial recreation site encompassing Condie Reservoir along the course of Boggy Creek in the RM of Sherwood No. 159. Condie Reservoir was constructed in 1924 to supply water for steam engines travelling through Regina. The park is open year-round and has a picnic area, hiking trails, and access to the lake for fishing. Fish found in this 3.8 m (12 ft) deep, 67.4 ha (167 acres) lake include northern pike and yellow perch. Wildflowers such as wild roses, gaillardia, and western red lilies are found in the park. It is also home to birds such as pelicans, hawks, ducks, and swallows. Access is from Highway 734.

== See also ==
- List of rivers of Saskatchewan
- List of golf courses in Saskatchewan
- Tourism in Saskatchewan
