= Pheasant Creek =

River in Saskatchewan, Canada

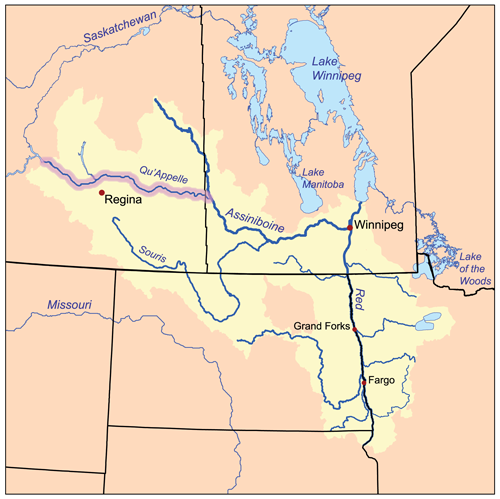
- The Red River drainage basin, with the Qu'Appelle River highlighted

- River's mouth in Saskatchewan Pheasant Creek (Canada)

Location
- Country: Canada
- Provinces: Saskatchewan

Physical characteristics
- Source: North-west of Ituna
  - coordinates: 50°35′00″N 103°28′02″W
- Mouth: Qu'Appelle River
  - location: downstream (east) of Katepwa Lake

Basin features
- River system: Red River drainage basin

Pheasant Creek is a river that runs along the bottom of one of the many coulees that branch off the Qu'Appelle Valley and empties into the Qu'Appelle River in southern Saskatchewan. The creek starts between the communities of Ituna and Jasmin, meanders south of the village of Abernethy and north of the village of Sintaluta. The Qu'Appelle River drainage basin is divided into two sections, the Upper and lower watersheds. Pheasant Creek is a tributary of the lower watershed.

== See also ==
- List of rivers of Saskatchewan
