= Mission Lake =

Lake in Saskatchewan, Canada

- Lebret Lake
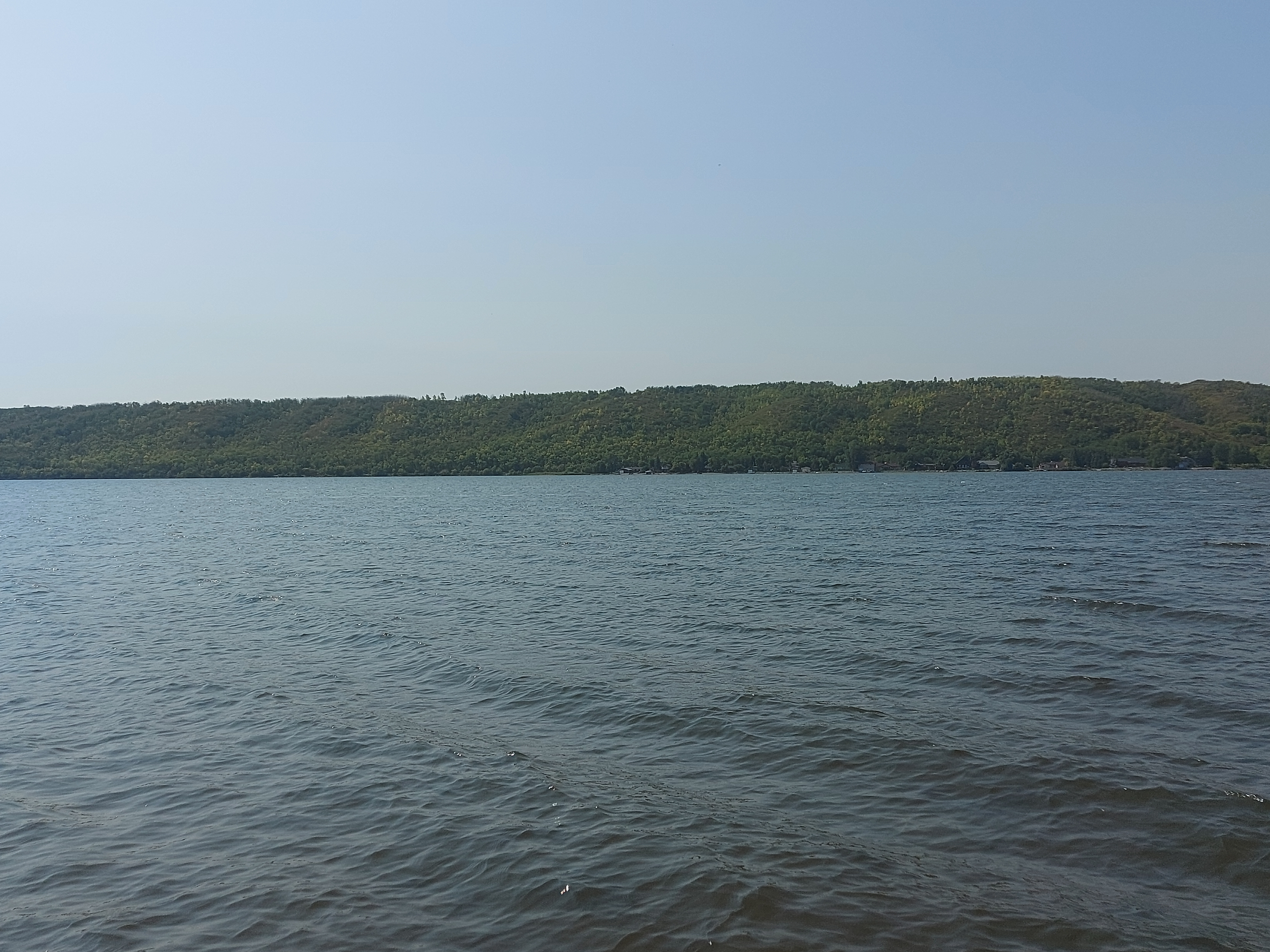
- Mission Lake

- Location in Saskatchewan Mission Lake (Canada)
- Location: Southeast Saskatchewan
- Group: Fishing Lakes
- Coordinates: 50°45′33″N 103°44′29″W
- Part of: Red River drainage basin
- Primary inflows: Qu'Appelle River
- Primary outflows: Qu'Appelle River
- Basin countries: Canada
- Max. length: 5 km (3.1 mi)
- Max. width: 1.6 km (0.99 mi)
- Surface area: 769 ha (1,900 acres)
- Average depth: 8.3 m (27 ft)
- Max. depth: 16.8 m (55 ft)
- Water volume: 62,937 dam^{3} (51,024 acre⋅ft)
- Shore length^{1}: 14.5 km (9.0 mi)
- Surface elevation: 459 m (1,506 ft)
- Settlements: Lebret
- ^{1} Shore length is not a well-defined measure.

Mission Lake, also known as Lebret Lake, is a lake in the Canadian province of Saskatchewan. It is one of four lakes along the Qu'Appelle River known as the Fishing Lakes. Echo Lake is upstream while Katepwa Lake is downstream. The lake was named 'Mission' after the Catholic mission at Lebret. Highways 22, 35, and 56 provide access.

Mission Lake, as well as the other three Fishing Lakes, are all in the Qu'Appelle Valley, which was formed about 14,000 years ago during the last ice age. Meltwater from the glaciers carved out the valley and as water levels rose and fell, alluvium was left in the wake. These piles of alluvium are what created the separations between the lakes.

The Qu'Appelle River is both the primary inflow and outflow. The river enters the lake at the west end, near the town of Fort Qu'Appelle, and exits the lake at the south-east end. Echo Creek is a small creek that rises to the south-west near McLean and enters the lake at the south-west corner at Fort Qu'Appelle.

== Communities ==
Mission Lake is located in the RM of North Qu'Appelle No. 187. At the western end is the town of Fort Qu'Appelle, which sits between Mission and Echo Lakes. The village of Lebret and the adjoining Wa-pii-moos-toosis Indian reserve are on the northern shore along Highway 56. The Qu'Appelle Indian Residential School was located on the Wa-pii-moos-toosis Indian reserve.

== Recreation ==
Mission Ridge Winter Park is a ski resort in the Qu'Appelle River valley near the south-west area of the lake. Syrian Beach is on the southern shore, near the east end and directly across the lake from Lebret. Lebret Provincial Recreation Site is at the village of Lebret. It is a small park at Haffner Beach with a picnic area and boat launch.

== Fish species ==
Fish commonly found in Mission Lake include walleye, perch, bigmouth buffalo, white sucker, northern pike, channel catfish, burbot, lake whitefish, cisco, common carp, and yellow perch.

== Gallery ==
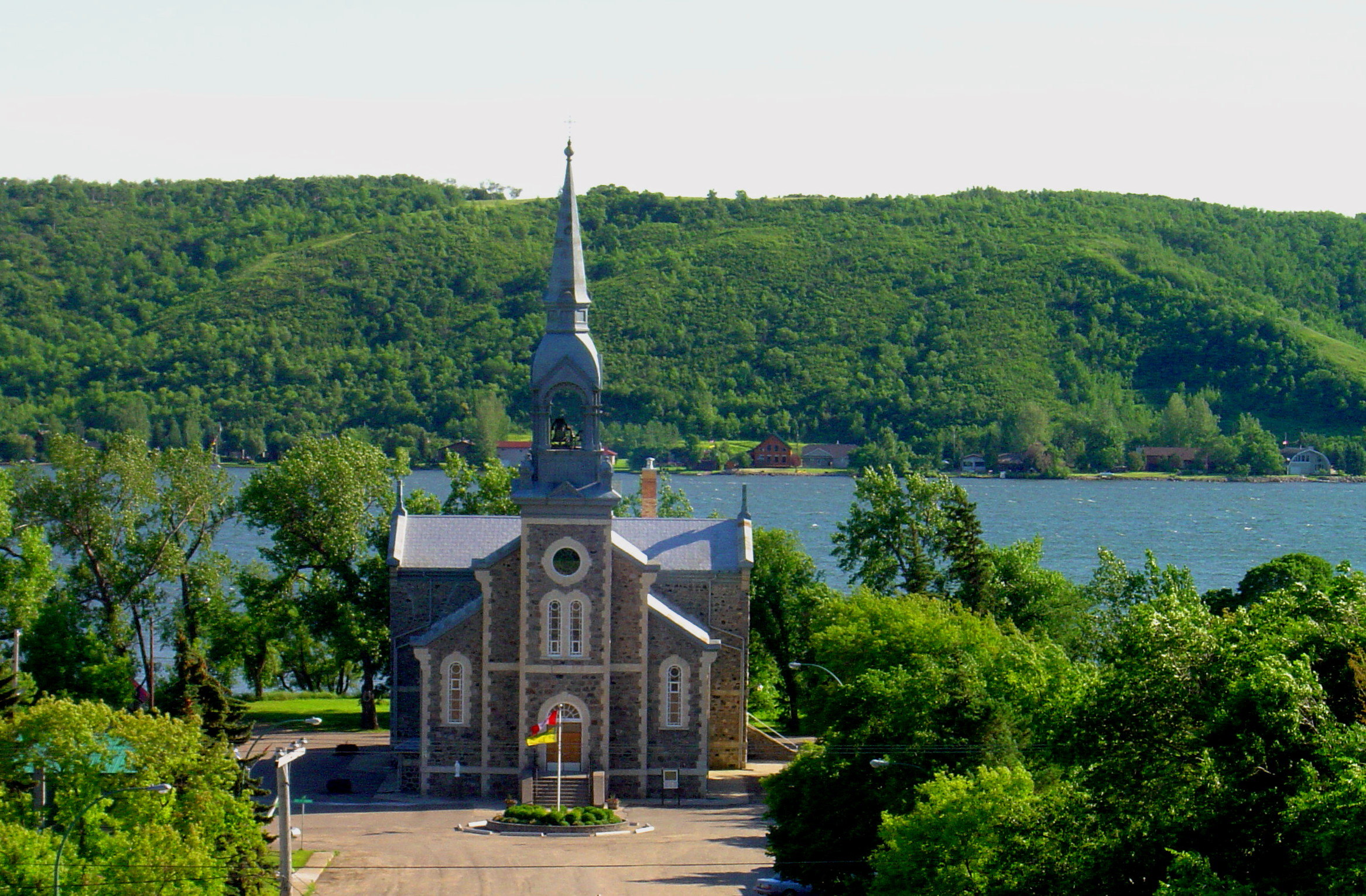
Sacred Heart Roman Catholic Church

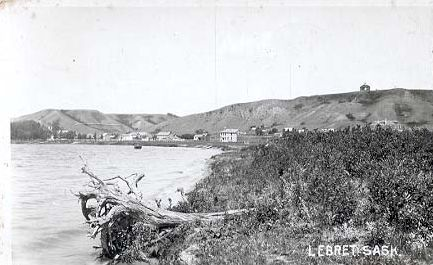
Mission Lake and Lebret, 1921

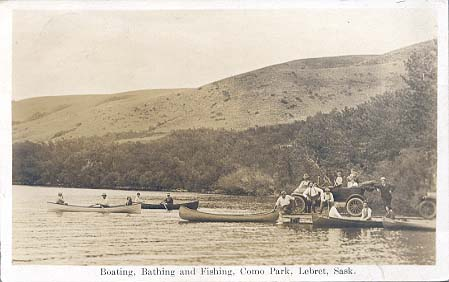
Mission Lake, c. 1920s

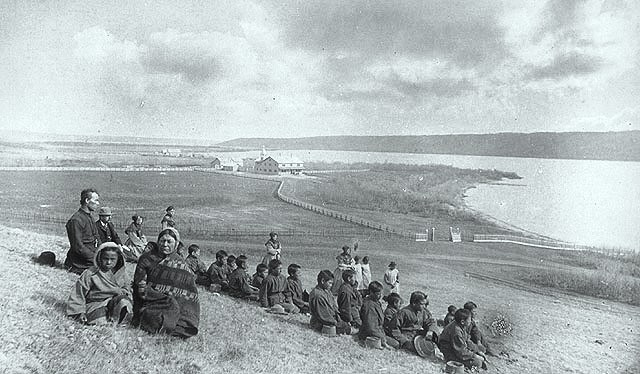
Mission Lake and Fort Qu'Appelle Indian Industrial School, May 1885

== See also ==
- List of lakes of Saskatchewan
- Tourism in Saskatchewan
