= Mission Ridge Winter Park =

Ski resort in Saskatchewan, Canada

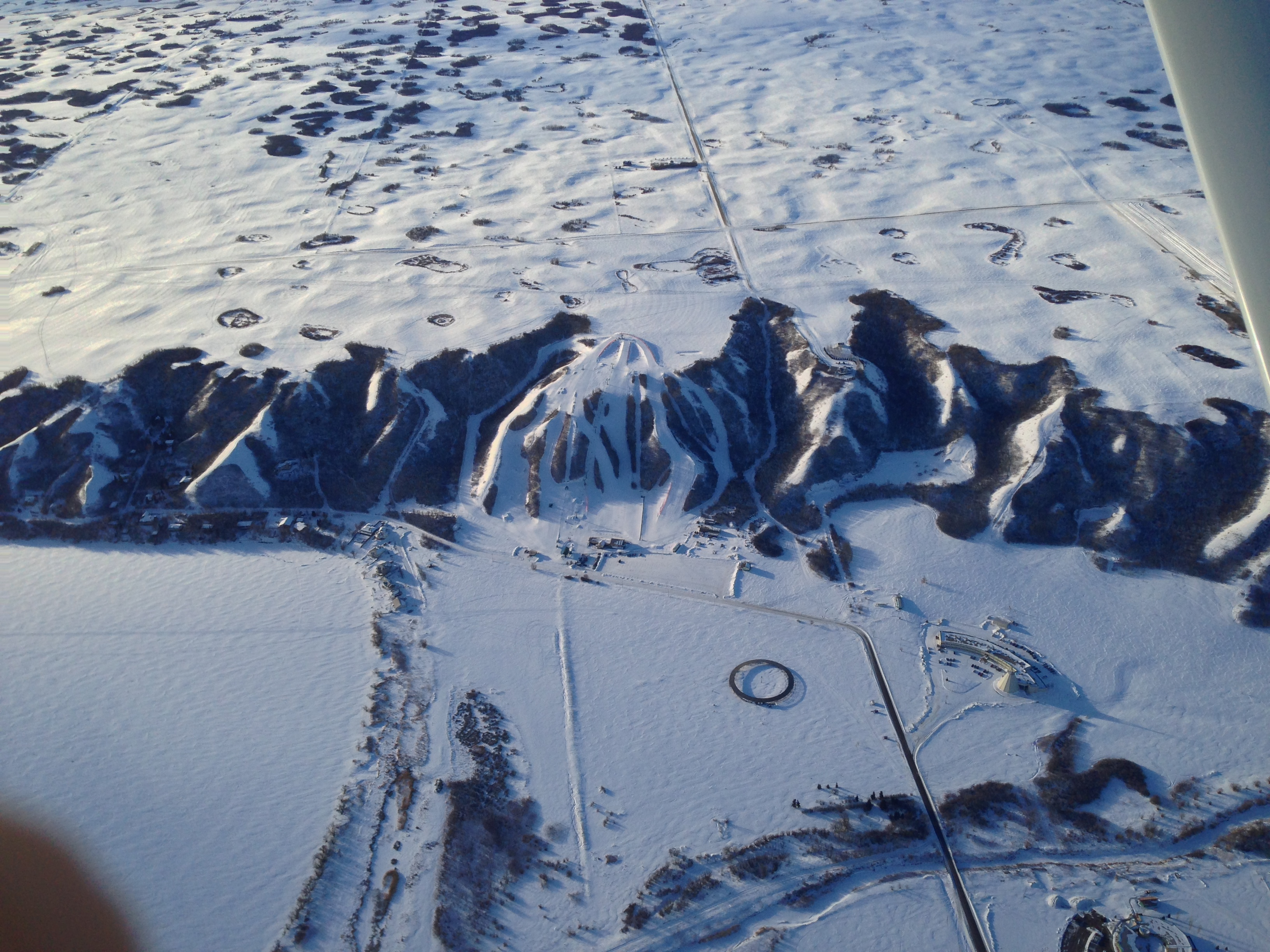
- Mission Ridge Winter Park

- Location within Saskatchewan Location within Canada
- Location: Fort Qu'Appelle; Saskatchewan, Canada
- Nearest city: Regina, Saskatchewan
- Coordinates: 50.7553°N 103.7817°W
- Vertical: 89 m (292 ft)
- Skiable area: 25 acres (0.1 km^{2})
- Trails: 14 25% - Easiest; 25% - More Difficult; 42% - Most Difficult; 8% - Extremely Difficult
- Longest run: 0.79 km (0.49 mi)
- Lift system: 1 Triple Chairlift, 2 carpet lifts
- Terrain parks: yes
- Snowfall: 0.91 m (3 ft 0 in) annually
- Snowmaking: 100%
- Website: Mission Ridge Winter Park

Mission Ridge Winter Park is a ski resort in Saskatchewan, Canada. It has a vertical drop of 292 feet (89 m). It is located in the Qu'Appelle Valley near Mission Lake and the town of Fort Qu'Appelle.

== See also ==
- List of ski areas and resorts in Canada
- Tourism in Saskatchewan
