= Kings Park Speedway =

Coordinates: 50.51534°N 104.497082°W

- Location: Regina, Saskatchewan, Canada
- Operator: Regina Auto Racing Club
- Opened: 1967
- Major events: CASCAR West

Oval
- Surface: Paved
- Length: 0.5 km (0.31 mi)

Kings Park Speedway is an auto racing facility situated northeast of Regina and northwest of Pilot Butte, Saskatchewan, Canada. It is operated by the Regina Auto Racing Club. The facility features a 1/3-mile high-banked paved oval with longer straights and tight turns, resembling a paperclip-style track. It is primarily used for stock car racing. Originally opened in 1967 as a dirt oval, the track was paved in 1970 and repaved in 2007. In 2010, it hosted events such as Pro Trucks, Baby Grand Racing Series, Legends of Alberta, Western Canada Super Late Model Racing Series, Evolution Mini Cup Car Series, and numerous provincial racing divisions. In 2016, it held regular races in the Street Stock, Bomber, and Mini Stock classes. Special events in 2015 included drifting, trailer racing, and wheelies. In 2017, Kings Park Speedway celebrated its 50th season.
