= Rural Municipality of Huron No. 223 =

Rural municipality in Saskatchewan, Canada

Huron No. 223
- Rural municipality
- Rural Municipality of Huron No. 223
- Location of the RM of Huron No. 223 in Saskatchewan
- Coordinates: 50.967°N 106.329°W
- Country: Canada
- Province: Saskatchewan
- Census division: 7
- SARM division: 2
- Formed: December 12, 1910

Government
  - Reeve: Corey Doerksen
  - Governing body: RM of Huron No. 223 Council
  - Administrator: Daryl Dean
  - Office location: Tugaske

Area (2016)
  - Land: 842.11 km^{2} (325.14 sq mi)

Population (2016)
  - Total: 198
  - Density: 0.2/km^{2} (0.52/sq mi)
- Time zone: CST
  - Summer (DST): CST
- Area codes: 306 and 639

The Rural Municipality of Huron No. 223 (2016 population: 198) is a rural municipality (RM) in the Canadian province of Saskatchewan within Census Division No. 7 and SARM Division No. 2.

== History ==
The RM of Huron No. 223 incorporated as a rural municipality on December 12, 1910.

== Geography ==
=== Communities and localities ===
The following urban municipalities are surrounded by the RM.

Villages

- Tugaske.

Unincorporated communities

- Bridgeford

=== Lakes and rivers ===
- Qu'Appelle River
- Eyebrow Lake

== Demographics ==
Population history (1981–2016)
Year	Pop.	±%
1981	341	—
1986	315	−7.6%
1991	277	−12.1%
1996	263	−5.1%
2001	249	−5.3%
2006	233	−6.4%
2011	196	−15.9%
2016	198	+1.0%
Source: Statistics Canada via Saskatchewan Bureau of Statistics

In the 2021 Census of Population conducted by Statistics Canada, the RM of Huron No. 223 had a population of 205 living in 47 of its 59 total private dwellings, a change of 3.5% from its 2016 population of 198. With a land area of 830.68 km^{2} (320.73 sq mi), it had a population density of 0.2/km^{2} (0.6/sq mi) in 2021.

In the 2016 Census of Population, the RM of Huron No. 223 recorded a population of 198 living in 48 of its 51 total private dwellings, a 1% change from its 2011 population of 196. With a land area of 842.11 km^{2} (325.14 sq mi), it had a population density of 0.2/km^{2} (0.6/sq mi) in 2016.

== Government ==
The RM of Huron No. 223 is governed by an elected municipal council and an appointed administrator that meets on the first Wednesday of every month. The reeve of the RM is Corey Doerksen while its administrator is Daryl Dean. The RM's office is located in Tugaske.
