= Rowe Lake =

- Location within Michigan
- Location: Berrien County, Michigan
- Coordinates: 42°03′30″N 86°14′55″W
- Type: Lake
- Surface area: 30.42 acres (12.31 ha)

Rowe Lake is a lake in Berrien County, in the U.S. state of Michigan. It is 30.42 acres (12.31 ha) in area.

Rowe Lake has the name of John Rowe, a pioneer settler.
