= Eyebrow Lake =

Lake in Saskatchewan, Canada

- Location in Saskatchewan Eyebrow Lake (Canada)
- Location: RM of Huron No. 223, Saskatchewan
- Coordinates: 50°56′0″N 106°9′2″W
- Type: Man-made
- Part of: Red River drainage basin
- Primary inflows: Qu'Appelle River
- Primary outflows: Qu'Appelle River
- Basin countries: Canada
- Max. length: 9 km (5.6 mi)
- Max. width: 1 km (0.62 mi)
- Surface area: 904.6 ha (2,235 acres)
- Shore length^{1}: 22 km (14 mi)
- Surface elevation: 524 m (1,719 ft)
- Settlements: None
- ^{1} Shore length is not a well-defined measure.

Eyebrow Lake is a man-made, marshy lake that parallels the Qu'Appelle River in the southern region of the Canadian province of Saskatchewan. Located in the RM of Huron No. 223, it is the first lake in a series of lakes along the Qu'Appelle River after Qu'Appelle River Dam and Lake Diefenbaker. The next lake downstream is Buffalo Pound Lake. The closest community is the village of Tugaske and, while there are no public recreation sites at the lake, it can be accessed by Highway 627. The lake gets its name from the nearby Eyebrow Hills, which are shaped like an eyebrow. The nearby town of Eyebrow and RM of Eyebrow No. 193 are also named after these hills.

The entire lake and much of the surrounding landscape is an Important Bird Area of Canada while the lower half is part of the provincial Nisku Wildlife Refuge (50.9334°N 106.1673°W).

== Description ==
Eyebrow Lake is set in the Upper Qu'Appelle Valley, which was created about 14,000 years ago during the melting of the last ice age. The valley is noted for its steep sides, flat bottom, and multiple coulees. As such, inflows for Eyebrow Lake include the Qu'Appelle River and multiple streams coming down through the coulees, including Deer Run Creek at the north-western corner. Eyebrow Lake is about 1 kilometre (0.62 mi) wide, 9 kilometres (5.6 mi) long, and covers an area of 904.6 hectares (2,235 acres).

In 1968, a major water management project was begun to offset the effects of periodic droughts in the region. Prior to the project, at the location of Eyebrow Lake was a large marsh in the Qu'Appelle River's floodplain. A series of dykes were built creating five basins allowing water levels to be controlled, which resulted in a permanent lake and marshland. The Qu'Appelle River runs along the north and eastern edge of the lake in a canal.

== Important Bird Area ==
In 1969, the Nisku Project was initiated at Eyebrow Lake by Ducks Unlimited Canada. The project was designed to help re-establish Canada geese into Saskatchewan. Goslings were raised at the lake and then distributed throughout the province into marshes, lakes, and ponds. In the 1980s, after the geese were well established throughout the southern prairies, the project ended. The lake is now an Important Bird Area (IBA) of Canada designated as Eyebrow Lake SK 058 and is operated by Ducks Unlimited Canada. The IBA covers an area of 160.78 square kilometres (62.08 sq mi).

== Flora and fauna ==
The surrounding prairie is a natural grassland habitat with few trees and the lake and surrounding marsh are abundant with bulrushes and cattails.

Almost 200 different species of birds are found at Eyebrow Lake. Some of which include black-crowned night herons, Franklin's gulls, black-necked grebes, American avocets, lesser scaups, marsh wrens, common yellowthroats, sedge wrens, LeConte's sparrows, Nelson's sparrows, ferruginous hawks, burrowing owls, cattle egrets, mallards, northern pintails, short-billed dowitchers, willets, and spotted sandpipers. While some of the birds make Eyebrow Lake home year-round, others are migratory.

Northern pike are one of the few species of fish in the lake.

== See also ==
- List of lakes of Saskatchewan
