= Graham Creek (Alberta) =

River in northern Alberta and Saskatchewan, Canada

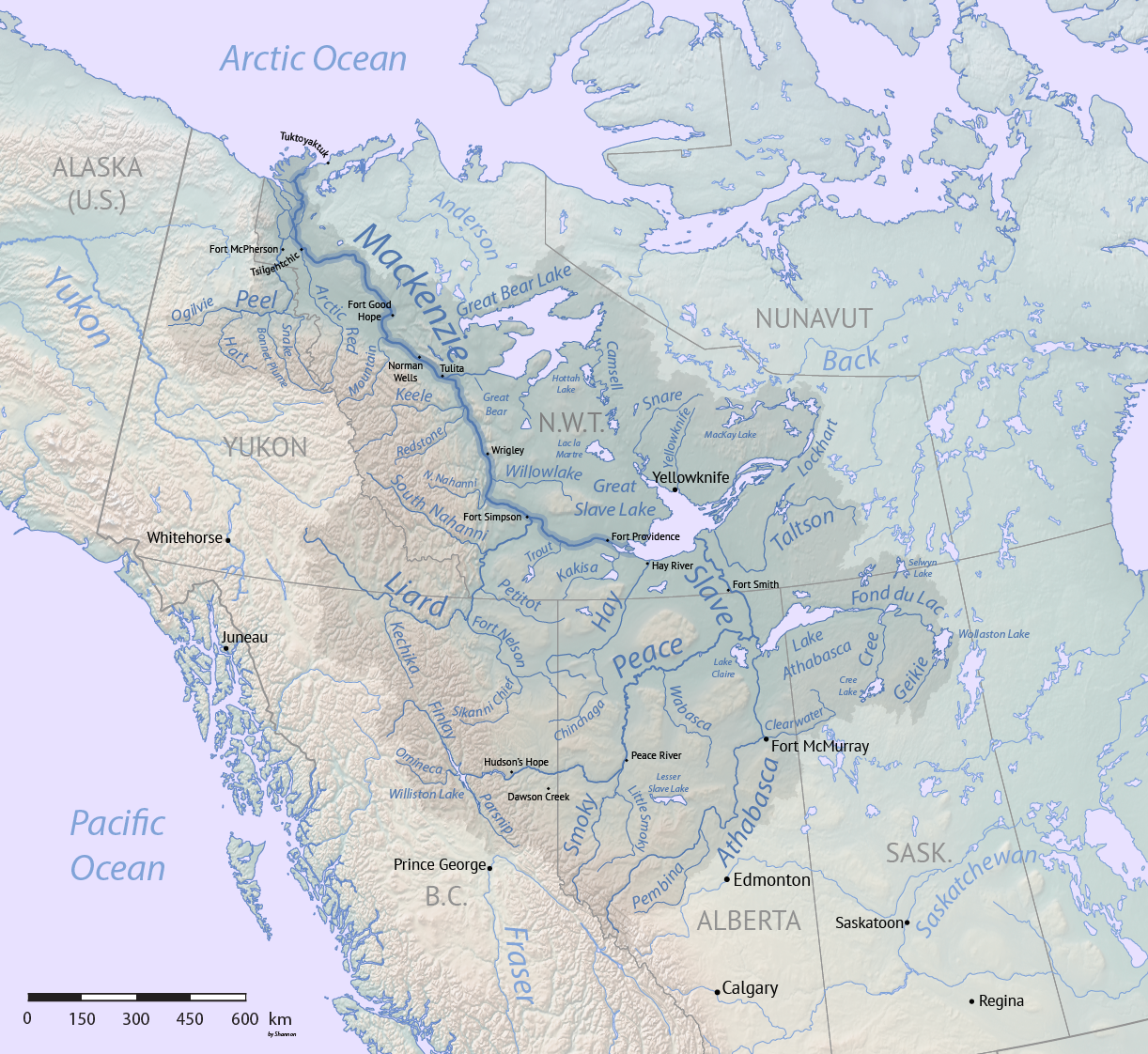
- Map of the Mackenzie River watershed

- Location of the river's mouth in Alberta Graham Creek (Alberta) (Canada)
- Etymology: Graham Davies, a government surveyor

Location
- Country: Canada
- Provinces: Alberta; Saskatchewan

Physical characteristics
- Source: Graham Lake
  - location: Northern Administration District, Saskatchewan
  - coordinates: 55.8959°N 109.9894°W
- Mouth: Landels River
  - location: Regional Municipality of Wood Buffalo, Alberta
  - coordinates: 55.9125°N 110.1056°W

Basin features
- River system: Mackenzie River

Graham Creek is a river in Alberta and Saskatchewan, Canada. It is a tributary of the Landels River. Its source is Graham Lake in Saskatchewan, just to the east of the Alberta border. From the lake, Graham Creek flows east into Alberta then north-east to Landels River, which flows into the Winefred River which flows into the Christina River.

Graham Creek was named after Graham Davies, a government surveyor.

== See also ==
- List of rivers of Alberta
- List of rivers of Saskatchewan
