= Graham Creek (Rogue River tributary) =

Stream in Oregon, U.S.

Location
- Country: United States
- State: Oregon

Physical characteristics
- Source
  - coordinates: 42°46′55″N 122°29′47″W

Graham Creek is a stream in the U.S. state of Oregon. It is a tributary to the Rogue River.

Graham Creek was named in 1904 after Edwin Graham, a local farmer.
