= Qu'Appelle River =

River in Western Canada

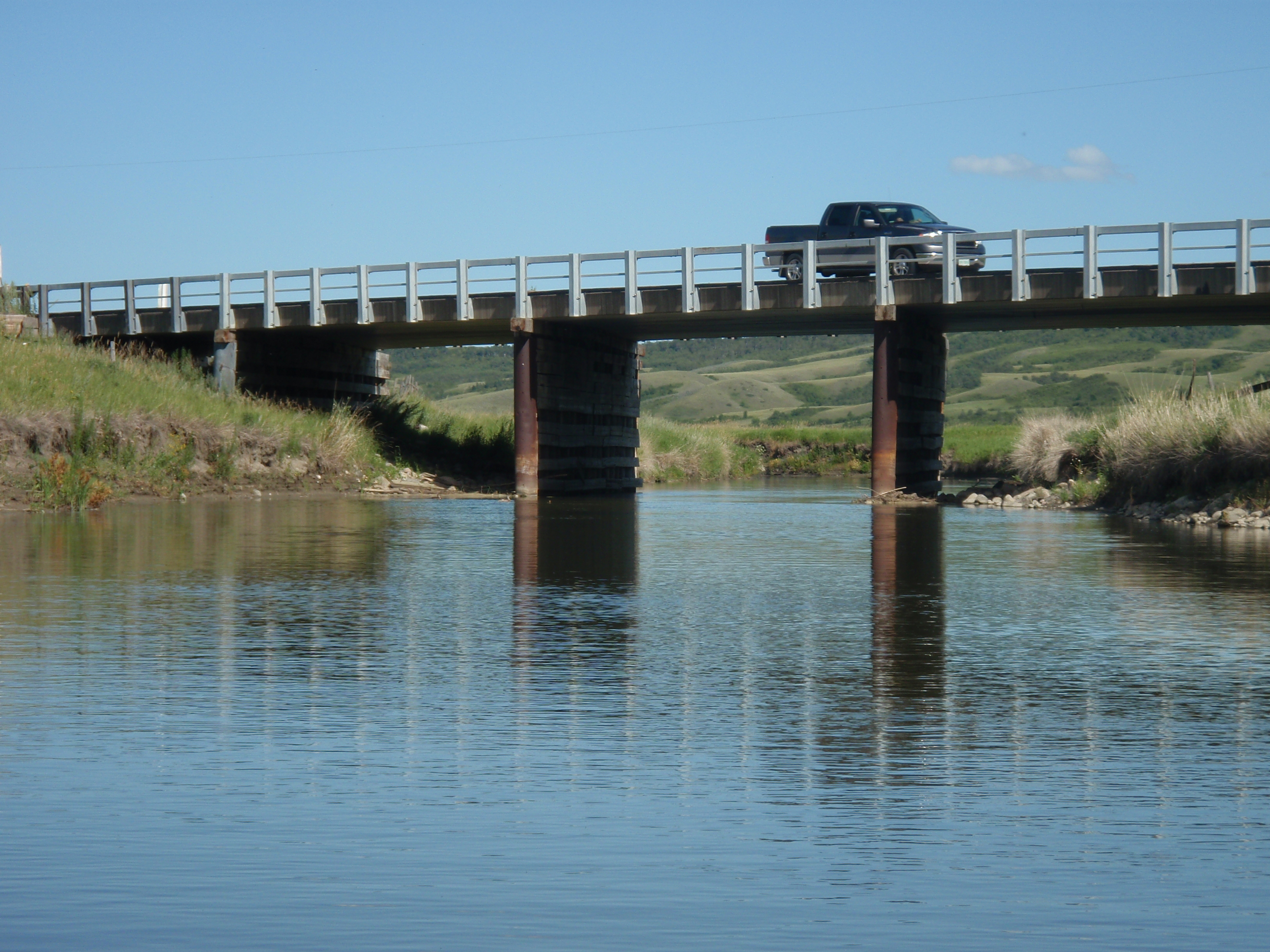
- Qu'Appelle River

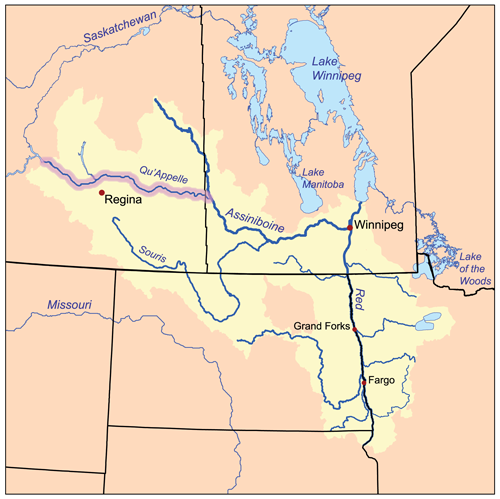
- The Red River drainage basin, with the Qu'Appelle River highlighted

- Location of mouth in Manitoba Qu'Appelle River (Canada)
- Native name: kâ-têpwêwi-sîpiy (Cree); ᑳ ᑌᐻᐏ ᓰᐱᐩ (Cree)

Location
- Country: Canada
- Provinces: Saskatchewan; Manitoba

Physical characteristics
- Source: Lake Diefenbaker
  - location: Qu'Appelle River Dam, Saskatchewan.
  - coordinates: 50°58′30″N 106°26′02″W
  - elevation: 550 m (1,800 ft)
- Mouth: Assiniboine River
  - location: Near St. Lazare, Manitoba.
  - coordinates: 50°26′38″N 101°19′11″W
  - elevation: 400 m (1,300 ft)
- Length: 430 km (270 mi)
- Basin size: 51,000 km^{2} (20,000 sq mi)

Basin features
- River system: Red River drainage basin
- Tributaries
  - left: Last Mountain Creek; Pheasant Creek
  - right: Iskwao Creek; Moose Jaw River; Wascana Creek; Boggy Creek; Echo Creek

The Qu'Appelle River /kəˈpɛl/ is a river in the Canadian provinces of Saskatchewan and Manitoba that flows 430 kilometres (270 mi) east from Lake Diefenbaker in south-western Saskatchewan to join the Assiniboine River in Manitoba, just south of Lake of the Prairies, near the village of St. Lazare. It is in a region called the Prairie Pothole Region of North America, which extends throughout three Canadian provinces and five U.S. states. It is also within Palliser's Triangle and the Great Plains ecoregion.

With the construction of the Qu'Appelle River Dam and the Gardiner Dam upstream, water flow was significantly increased and regulated. Most of the Qu'Appelle's present flow is actually water diverted from the South Saskatchewan River.

== Upper and lower watersheds ==
According to the Saskatchewan Water Security Agency, the Qu'Appelle Valley is made up of two watersheds with the dividing point being Craven Dam on the east side of Craven.

=== Lower Qu'Appelle Watershed ===
The Lower Qu'Appelle Valley is in the south-eastern part of Saskatchewan and covers an area of 17,800 square kilometres (6,900 sq mi). The Lower Qu'Appelle Watershed begins at the Craven Dam east of the village of Craven and extends to the Manitoba border. In the Lower Qu'Appelle Valley, the river flows through six major lakes. From west to east are the Pasqua, Echo, Mission, Katepwa, Crooked, and Round Lakes. Major tributaries in this watershed are Loon, Jumping Deer, Pheasant, and Kapsovar Creeks. Lesser tributaries include the Pearl, Indianhead, Redfox, Ekapo, Cutarm, and Scissor Creeks.

=== The Wascana and Upper Qu’Appelle Watersheds ===
The Wascana and Upper Qu’Appelle Watersheds are made up of four sub-basins and the Moose Jaw River Watershed. The four sub-basins total about 14,143 square kilometres (5,461 sq mi) and the Moose Jaw River Watershed adds a further 9,360 square kilometres (3,610 sq mi). The total combined drainage basin for the Upper Qu'Appelle Watershed is 23,443 square kilometres (9,051 sq mi).

The four sub-basins include the Lanigan-Manitou Sub-basin, Wascana Creek Sub-basin, Last Mountain Lake Sub-basin, and the Upper Qu'Appelle Sub-basin. The Upper Qu'Appelle Sub-basin includes all of the remaining land not included in the other basins all the way up to Qu'Appelle River Dam.

The Upper Qu'Appelle River is fed by several rivers and creeks which include Ridge Creek, Iskwao Creek, High Hill Creek, Deer Run Creek, Wascana Creek, Boggy, and Flying Creeks, Last Mountain Creek, and Moose Jaw River. There are two major lakes along the course of the river in the Upper Qu'Appelle Sub-basin: Buffalo Pound Lake and Eyebrow Lake. Another major lake, Last Mountain Lake, flows into the Upper Qu'Appelle River through Last Mountain Creek at Craven.

== Description ==
The river flows into several lakes in south-eastern Saskatchewan, including:

- Eyebrow Lake, Buffalo Pound Lake to the north of Moose Jaw, which supplies water to Moose Jaw, Regina, and the Mosaic Potash Mine at Belle Plaine;
- The Fishing Lakes (Pasqua, Echo, Mission, and Katepwa lakes) to the north-east of Regina; and,
- farther downstream, to the north of Grenfell and Broadview: Crooked Lake and Round Lake.

Assorted tributary coulees drain into the Qu'Appelle Valley at various junctures along its course, including Echo Creek at Fort Qu'Appelle, Moose Jaw River, Wascana Creek, Loon Creek, Jumping Deer Creek, Pheasant Creek, Kaposvar Creek, and Last Mountain Creek.

93% of the land in the Qu'Appelle Rivershed is used for agriculture purposes.

Last Mountain Lake, the largest natural lake in southern Saskatchewan (Lake Diefenbaker is larger but is a man-made reservoir), drains into the Qu'Appelle near the town of Craven, through Last Mountain Creek.

== History ==
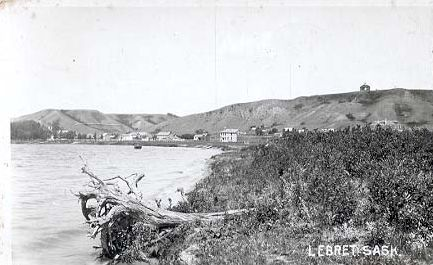
Qu'Appelle Indian Residential School on Mission Lake, 1921

In 1787, the North West Company established a fur trading post at Fort Espérance on the lower river. After it was abandoned in 1819, the Hudson's Bay Company established a post at Fort Qu'Appelle in 1852 immediately adjacent to the site of what became the town of the same name.

The Qu'Appelle River and Valley derive their name from a Cree legend of a spirit that travels up and down it. The aboriginal people told the North West Company trader Daniel Harmon in 1804 that they often heard the voice of a human calling, "kâ-têpwêt?", meaning "What is calling?" ("que + appelle?" in French). They would respond, and the call would echo back (there is a strong echo phenomenon at Lebret). The name of the river in the Cree language is kâ-têpwêwi-sîpiy ᑳ ᑌᐻᐏ ᓰᐱᐩ.

Pauline Johnson, a half-Mohawk poet, learned of the legend and elaborated upon it with Victorian sentiment. In her version, a young Cree swain heard his name while crossing one of the lakes and replied, "Who calls?" Only his echo could be heard (hence Echo Lake), and he realized it had been his bride-to-be calling out his name at the instant of her death.

== Communities ==
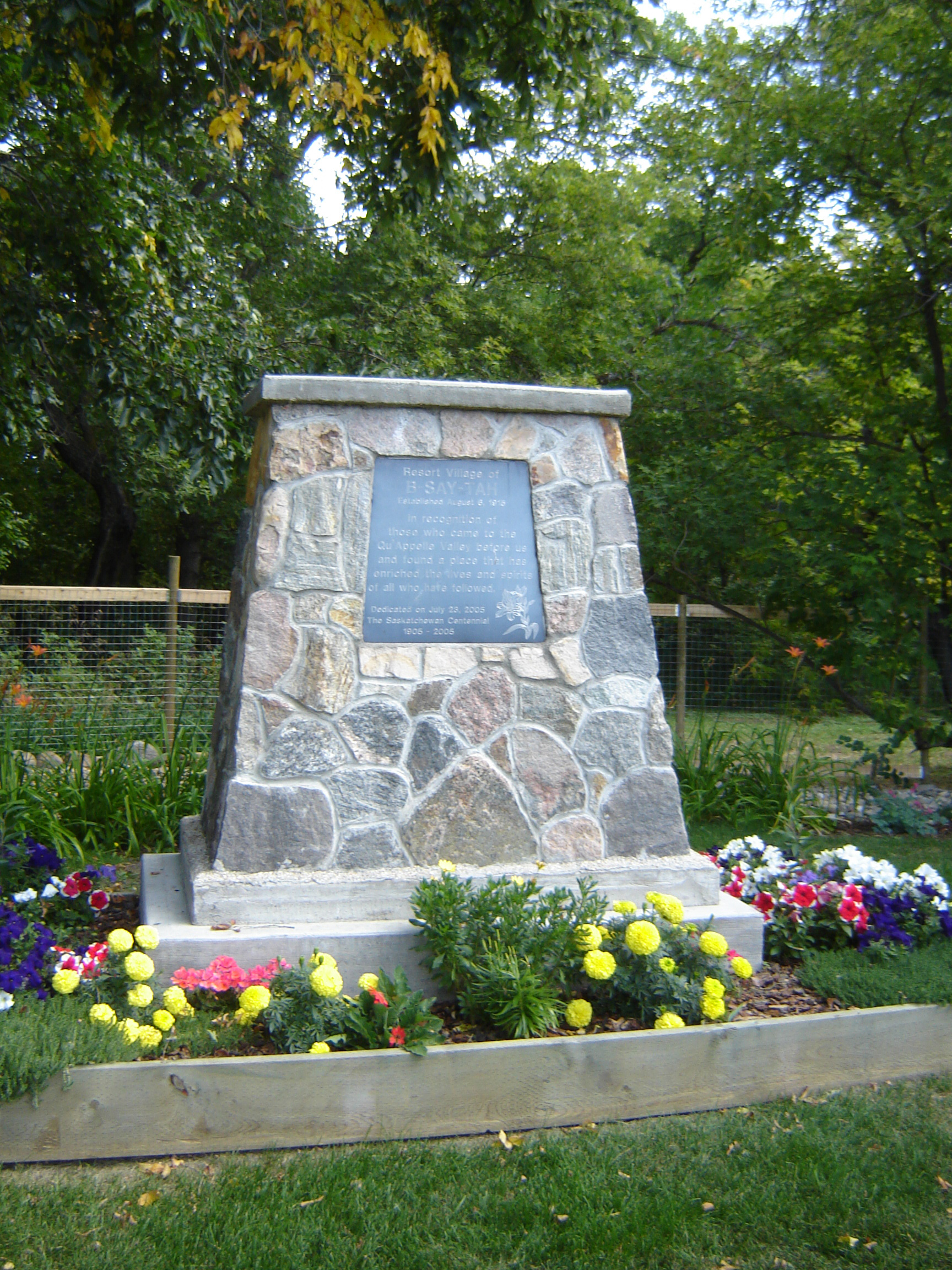
B-Say-Tah on Echo Lake in the Qu'Appelle Valley

While there are no large population centres along the course of the river, only small towns, Indian reserves, villages, and resort villages, within the river's watershed is the province's second largest city and capital, Regina. St. Lazare is the only community on the river in Manitoba and it sits at the confluence of the Assiniboine and Qu'Appelle Rivers.

=== Reserve lands ===
The Qu'Appelle Valley is in Treaty 4 territory and is home to the Cree, Saulteaux, Dakota, and Nakota peoples who have inhabited the last 11,000 years. However, due to acts such as the Indian Act of 1876, Indigenous peoples were forced to live on reserves. The Indian reserves located within the Qu'Appelle Valley include Piapot, Pasqua, Muscowpetung, Standing Buffalo, Cowessess, Kahkewistahaw, Sakimay, and Ochapowace.

=== Towns and villages ===
There are two towns and two villages in the valley along the course of the river. The first town within the valley is Lumsden with a total population of 1,824. The second town in the Qu'Appelle Valley is Fort Qu'Appelle with a total population of 2,027. Located approximately 70 kilometres (43 mi) north-east of Regina, the town of Fort Qu'Appelle is located between Echo Lake and Mission Lake. This town is of historical significance as it acted as a confluence between major trails that were positioned across the North-West Territories and as it was the place of signing for Treaty 4. The first village within the Qu'Appelle Valley is Craven, which is north-east of Regina at the junction of Highways 20 and 99. This village is home to the Country Thunder Music Festival—previously known as the Craven Country Jamboree. Although the population of Craven year-round is 214, when the Craven Country Jamboree is on, it becomes as populated as the biggest cities in Saskatchewan. The second village within the Qu'Appelle Valley is Tantallon, which has a total population of 91. This village is located off of Highway 8, and is known for its large statue of a whitetail deer.

=== Buffalo Pound Lake ===
The residential areas of Buffalo Pound Lake consist of multiple communities made up of both seasonal and year-round houses and cabins. Resort villages consist of North Grove, Sun Valley, and South Lake. Hamlets on Buffalo Pound Lake consist of Parkview and Sand Point Beach.

=== Fishing Lakes ===
The residential areas of the four Fishing Lakes consist of multiple communities made up of both seasonal and year-round houses and cabins. These communities consist of both resort villages and hamlets and are spread out among the four lakes. The resort villages are Fort San, and B-Say-Tah, and multiple communities representing the District of Katepwa. In addition to the resort villages, the organized hamlets consist of Pasqua Lake and Taylor Beach.

=== Crooked and Round Lakes ===
The residential areas of Crooked Lake are Sunset Beach, Moose Bay, Exner Twins Bay, Lakeside Beach, Melville Beach, Grenfell Beach, and Greenspot. East of Crooked Lake is Round Lake. The residential areas of Round Lake consist of two resort villages: Birds Point and West End.

== Qu'Appelle Valley ecology ==
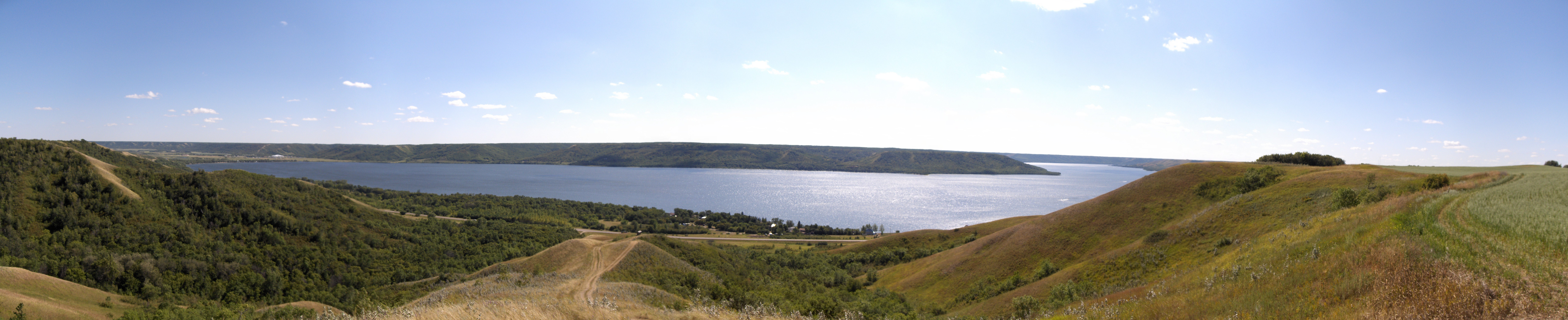
Qu'Appelle Valley

=== Ecosystems in the Qu'Appelle Valley ===
The Qu'Appelle Valley is made up of three ecosystems: grasslands, forests and wetlands. The temperate grassland ecosystem is one of the world's most endangered ecosystems as it is often converted into farmland or developed for human expansion. Grasslands are dominated mostly by grass species and various herbs. Few tree types grow in grasslands and if they do they are stunted due to the variability of moisture and temperature. Plants must have high tolerance to drought due to the low and varying precipitation. Roots of these plants grow deep into the ground in order to connect to the groundwater in the soil and reduce erosion. Wetlands in the valley ecosystem provide food and habitat for animals and also enhance water quality by filtering out toxins, water pollutants, and over accumulation of nutrients. Wetlands store rain water and overflows from rivers in order to reduce flooding, while the groundwater supply is fed through the watershed.

The Manitoba portion of the Qu'Appelle River Valley is considered a biodiversity hotspot, supporting numerous nationally and provincially rare species.

=== Flora ===
Forests of trembling aspen and green ash grow on the slopes of the Qu'Appelle Valley while grasslands grow on the south facing slope of the valley. There are rich wetlands and riparian vegetation, as well as hayfields and cultivated land on the valley floor. Bur oak mainly take up the eastern section of the valley appearing on the southern facing slopes.

=== Fauna ===
==== Aquatic species ====
There are 30 small- and large-bodied fish species that live in the water system in the Qu'Appelle Valley and make up 45% of the fish biodiversity in Saskatchewan. The bigmouth buffalo, a fish species restricted only to the Qu'Appelle River watershed, is under federal protection as it is at risk of becoming extinct due to habitat loss. The Water Security Agency speculates that dams and structures that control water have caused the degradation of spawning habitats for bigmouth buffalo due to the alteration of the natural flow of lakes and river systems. The Water Security Agency states that the highest threat to the bigmouth buffalo population is demand of water used for agricultural, commercial, and domestic purposes. The brown bullhead, channel catfish, chestnut lamprey, and rock bass, are some other uncommon fish that are found in the valley. The rock bass are Saskatchewan's only native bass. Other fish species found in the rivers and lakes of the Qu'Appelle Watershed include walleye, sauger, yellow perch, northern pike, lake whitefish, cisco, mooneye, white sucker, shorthead redhorse, common carp, black bullhead, burbot, and chub.

==== Terrestrial species ====
Bird species in the valley include the wood duck, eastern wood-pewee, lazuli bunting, and indigo bunting. Painted and snapping turtles can be found in the river and drainage systems that enter it. Some eastern animals found in the valley include the eastern grey squirrel, red belly snake, and smooth green snake. This area is also home to around 30 endangered animal species including loggerhead shrike, and the northern leopard frog.

=== Air and atmospheric conditions ===
Climatic characteristics that are common to the grasslands ecosystems are: high evaporation rates, droughts, low precipitation, and high summer temperatures. This moist-mixed grassland biome has a sub-humid continental climate. As such, it is generally dry, sunny, and has extreme temperatures in summer and winter. The mean annual precipitation is 365 millimetres (14.4 in). Between 1981 and 2010, the mean temperature for January was −14.2 °C (6.4 °F) and the mean temperature for July was 18.5 °C (65.3 °F).

=== Soil and terrain ===
The soil surface texture varies from loamy sand to loam and is low to moderately sensitive to compaction. The more compaction, the less the soil is capable of supporting plant growth. Because of the short warm season and long, cold winters, vegetation routinely dies and decomposers do not have adequate time to breakdown all the material. As a result, the groundcover of litter is built up. A large quantity of nutrients is stored in this litter as opposed to in the soil as it takes three to four years to be broken down in the grasslands. Because of the accumulation of plant litter on the top soil horizon, the soil is chernozemic and has a colour that varies from light brown to black. The soil is neutral to slightly alkaline, and it has a texture that is medium to moderately fine. Where the plants have been removed or replaced by invasive species, there is more erosion. As a result of the seasonal variability, there is significant erosion that occurs from the snowmelt each spring. The effects are intensified where there is little ground cover present. There is also more sediment deposited where agriculture has taken place because the disruption of the land has accelerated the erosion of the soil. 14,000 years ago the last ice age retreated, forming the Qu'Appelle Valley and leaving many glacial deposits and evidence in the soil. The municipality of Fort Qu'Appelle sits on alluvial deposits that consists of silt, sand, clay, gravel, and other organic material deposited by the glacier. In some parts of the valley, the deposits are 273 metres (896 ft) thick.

== Water management within the Qu'Appelle ==
=== Watershed plans ===
Each watershed has its own water resources protection plan. In the spring of 2009, planning staff from the Water Security Agency (WSA) invited stakeholders in the Lower Qu'Appelle River Watershed to participate in watershed planning. These stakeholders, representing various organizations within the watershed, formed two watershed advisory committees (WAC): the Eastern and Western Lower Qu'Appelle River WACs. The committees discuss aquifer protection, lake and river water management, and governance and legislative requirements.

=== Water supply and demand in the Qu'Appelle Valley ===
93% of the land in the Qu'Appelle Watershed is used for agricultural purposes. Five potash mines are in the basin and an increase in irrigation development is expected. Water demand is anticipated to increase by 126% from 2010 to 2060. On low flow years, Lake Diefenbaker supplies roughly 90% of the flow of the Qu'Appelle River. This water mainly originates from mountain snowmelt from the Rocky Mountains of Alberta. The South Saskatchewan River, which flows into Lake Diefenbaker, has seen flow rates drop by 12% in the last century. With only 2% increase from runoff, water scarcity could be a problem in the near future. On the other hand, severe flooding of the Qu'Appelle Valley could also occur. Studies suggest that due to climate change, 31% to 46% of glacier volume of the eastern Rockies could melt by 2100.

=== Water demand under the baseline scenario ===
In 2010, demand for water in the Qu'Appelle River Basin was estimated at 599,342 million litres (485,894 acre⋅ft) with direct anthropogenic demands accounting for 22.6% of the total demand. By 2060, estimates suggest that irrigation and expansion of the potash sector will account for 44.1% of water demand. Furthermore, there will be an increase of 162% in total direct anthropogenic water demand by 2060. The water demand per sector, according to the scenario analysis, is depicted below. As can be seen, agriculture demands the majority of the water in the Qu'Appelle basin.

1. Agriculture: 2020 estimated amount of water demand is 67,090 million litres (54,390 acre⋅ft). 2060 estimated amount of water demand is 206,353 million litres (167,293 acre⋅ft).
2. Industry and mining: 2010 amount of water demand was 21,815 million litres (17,686 acre⋅ft). 2020 estimated amount of water demand is 83,779 million litres (67,921 acre⋅ft). 2060 estimated amount of water demand is 95,460 million litres (77,390 acre⋅ft).

=== Water demand estimates under climate change scenario ===
Water demand is affected by changes in climate and occurrence of extreme weather related events. In the Qu'Appelle River Basin, climate change will produce higher temperatures and longer growing seasons which will have significant impacts on demand for water in the agricultural sector since crops and livestock will require more water. Industry and mining are not expected to increase their water demand under the referenced climate change scenario. Municipal and domestic sectors are expected to increase their demand minimally.

=== Water demand estimates under water conservation scenario ===
Under the water conservation scenario, a 14% reduction in demand could be achieved by reductions in agriculture, industrial, and mining water demands.

=== Impacts on water quality ===
The water quality of freshwater sources in Southern Saskatchewan is poor. This is a result of eutrophication and the high mineral content of the groundwater. According to the Water Security Agency and the Saskatchewan Ministry of Health, algae blooms occur during calm, hot weather in lakes with shallow, slow moving, or still water that have acquired high levels of nutrients that promote the blooms. The nutrients come from: crop and livestock production, surface runoff containing fertilizers, pesticides, and manure, waste from waterfront properties, and waste from upstream communities. The Saskatchewan Government's 2013 State of the Watershed report assessed the overall condition of the Wascana Watershed as "impacted" and the impact of its stressors as being of "high intensity."

In the Lower Qu'Appelle River Basin, shoreline properties result in water degradation because many disturb riparian areas and their septic infrastructure is aging and leaking. There is also a lack of policy to regulate and enforce septic infrastructure on shoreline properties. Short-term goals should focus on better education for citizens and cottage goers on how they can mitigate their environmental impact. Some solutions include using phosphate free shampoo, installing low flush toilets, and stopping illegal drainage.

=== Saskwater-Buffalo Pound Lake regional non-potable water supply system ===
Located 30 kilometres (19 mi) northeast of Moose Jaw, Buffalo Pound Lake is the first major lake along the path of the Qu'Appelle river after being released from the Qu'Appelle River Dam at Lake Diefenbaker. At levels of full supply, Buffalo Pound Lake holds 91,987,000 cubic metres (74,575 acre⋅ft) of water that is used for recreation, industrial operations and to supply water to roughly one quarter of the province. This non-potable water supply system is intended to service the needs of multiple industrial customers and meet the ever-growing demands of the Belle Plaine area, particularly with respect to potash mining operations. The proposed project consists of three main parts: an intake and pumping station, a pipeline to carry water to an area south of Kronau, Saskatchewan, and a booster station along the route of the pipeline. A number of potential environmental impacts have been identified. Firstly, the proposed water pipeline would cause ground disturbance and would cross over two major tributaries of the Qu'Appelle River: the Moose Jaw River and Wascana Creek. Included in the Environmental Impact Statement was the acknowledgement that Buffalo Pound contains at least two species of concern: bigmouth buffalo and the chestnut lamprey. There is concern that development may further threaten these and other fish species. There would be the reduction of habitat for several rare plant and animal species that are known to exist in the area. These include: big bluestem, few flowered aster, low milkvetch, lesser navarretia, Kelsey's cryptanthe, the burrowing owl, the piping plover, and the northern leopard frog. This project could also contribute to the loss or alteration of heritage resources used by First Nations and Metis peoples. Increased volume of traffic from vehicles is a concern as well as the ongoing maintenance of the river channels, pipelines, and pumping stations for years to come.

=== Dams in the Qu'Appelle Valley ===
In the 1930s, water in the Qu'Appelle basin became critical due to persistent drought in the prairie and the global economic depression. These incidents prompted the Federal Government to establish the Prairie Farm Rehabilitation Administration (PFRA). The PFRA was tasked with restoring drought and soil drift zones in the three prairie provinces and assisting in the protection of surface water supplies for household use, livestock and irrigation. Water in the river system was necessary to support human life as well as fisheries, livestock, and irrigation.

In May 1941, the PFRA requested the construction of a dam at the eastern end of Pasqua Lake — which would cause persistent floods in the Maskopetung and Pasqua reserves — and would require approval from the Ministry of Indian Affairs. This dam, known as the Echo Lake Project, was completed in 1942. At first, Indian Affairs believed that the dam project would cause damage to the environment and estimated that a total of $8,050 should be paid to the Muscowpetung and Pasqua Bands. Although both the PFRA and Indian Affairs agreed on the amount, it was never paid to the Bands. Furthermore, there is no evidence that the Muscowpetung and Pasqua Bands actually approved the dam project. Neither band received compensation until 1973 when negotiations began between the Bands and the PFRA. On 16 November 1976, the Bands accepted a one-time payment of $265,000 from the PFRA.

Also in 1941, the Crooked Lake and Round Lake Projects were launched. The PFRA began construction without the consent of the Bands in the dam area, but in 1943 paid $3,300 to the Sakimay, Cowessess and Ochapowace Bands.

== Historical land uses ==
The Qu'Appelle Valley corridor has a rich history of trade and natural resource use that dates back prior to written records. Utilizing the local plants and animals, many Indigenous people of the corridor participated in trade and other economic activities. Women picked berries and Seneca root to sell to settlers in addition to use at home, while men cut and sold firewood. Some living Indigenous elders from the Pasqua First Nation recall the days when they would pack up and head to what is now Regina's exhibition grounds to sell roots, berries, herbs and crafts.

The Indigenous people of the Qu'Appelle Valley hunted numerous animal species. Deer, the most common big game which was targeted in the years after Treaty 4 and depletion of wild bison herds, provided food and leather. Other animal species that were hunted in the area included elk, moose, antelope, and occasionally black bear. Small game and waterfowl were also targeted due to their abundance near the Qu'Appelle Valley lakes. Ducks (canvasbacks, blue bills, mallards and teals), geese, prairie chickens, partridges, and pheasants were among the bird species that were hunted for food. Trapping for furs was also a profitable economic activity to the Indigenous people of the Qu'Appelle Valley corridor in the early part of the 20th century. Locals would trap rabbit, beaver, mink, muskrat, coyote, gopher, weasel and skunk and when possible and legal, sell the furs to settlers.

Fishing for food and trade was practiced quite extensively. Targeted species within the Qu'Appelle Valley included walleye, perch, whitefish, northern pike and more. Before the days of treaties and reserve life First Nations people, including those in the Qu'Appelle Valley, constructed weirs at the narrow sections of rivers and streams in order to catch fish. Fish were either cooked soon after catch or split and smoked over fire in order to preserve for eating later. The berries that were picked in the Qu'Appelle Valley included chokecherries, saskatoon berries, cranberries, strawberries, raspberries, blueberries and others.

== Contemporary land uses ==
The valley has a number of contemporary uses including hunting, fishing, trapping, gathering, and scientific study. Indigenous peoples have a connection to Indigenous knowledge and traditions that is evident in their contemporary use of the land.

=== Hunting ===
Big game and birds are the main focus for hunting in the valley. The primary big game animals include mule deer, whitetail deer, elk, moose, pronghorn, and black bear. The birds that are hunted include migratory game birds (geese, ducks, cranes, coots, and snipes), and upland game birds (grouse, partridge, and pheasants).

=== Fishing ===
Fish commonly found in the Qu'Appelle River system include northern pike, walleye, whitefish, tullibee, burbot, yellow perch, carp, bigmouth buffalo, white sucker, and channel catfish. The valley is also home to the Saskatchewan Fish Hatchery at Echo Lake that produces 20 million walleye a year to be distributed around the province.

=== Trapping ===
People continue to trap rabbit, beaver, coyote, mink, muskrat, lynx, and weasel. Here, the trapping zone is called the Southern Fur Conservation Area (SFCA). The area used by most Indigenous trappers is near the Pasqua First Nation in the fall and winter seasons.

=== Gathering ===
People gather fruits and vegetables along with medicinal plants. The berries that are gathered are chokecherries, saskatoon berries, high-bush cranberries, gooseberries, pincherries, and raspberries. Modern day gatherers still pick medicinal plants, including berries, herbs, and sweetgrass; however, the Pasqua Nation is concerned that knowledge about medicinal plants is being lost.

== Parks and recreation ==
The Qu'appelle Valley contains a number of parks and recreational sites including those of Echo Valley, Crooked Lake, Katepwa Point, Regina Beach, Buffalo Pound, Mission Ridge, and Beaver Creek. Echo Lake and the Calling Lakes chain are especially popular and attract many travellers from the city of Regina. Activities occur year-round in the valley despite the cold winters. In the spring and summer, people enjoy canoeing, kayaking, camping, and swimming, while in the fall hiking becomes quite popular. During the winter, activities include skiing, snowshoeing, snowmobiling, and sleigh rides.

In addition to the popularity of its lakes as summer recreational locales, the valley also contains popular venues for winter sports including the following:

- White Track ski resort on Buffalo Pound Lake
- Mission Ridge Winter Park, a popular skiing and snowboarding destination on the south shore of Mission Lake immediately adjacent to Fort Qu'Appelle
- Last Oak Golf Course to the north of Broadview, some 80 miles (130 km) east of Regina
- Hang gliding (and, less often, paragliding) from the valley slopes, especially in the Crooked Lake and Round Lake regions. In this area the valley is up to 450 feet (140 m) deep and a mile wide, allowing for strong, smooth airflow up the side of the valley and ample landing areas on top and down in the valley, and providing a strong upward component of wind as it flows over the (in some places) optimally rounded valley edge, allowing pilots to soar in the "ridge lift" for many hours at a time. Pilots commonly travel from Manitoba and Alberta and of course other locations in Saskatchewan to fly this natural wonder of the prairies.
- The river valley contains relatively undisturbed grassland and coulees which provide habitat for native plant and animal species, such as the loggerhead shrike and the coyote (locally /ˈkaɪ.oʊt/). The easternmost slopes contain bur oaks, the only natural occurrence of oak trees in Saskatchewan.
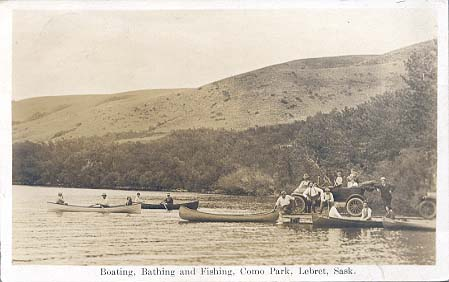
Como Park, in resort village of Sandy Beach on Katepwa Lake, 1920s

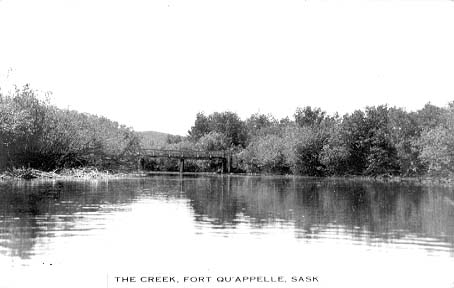
Qu'Appelle River, Fort Qu'Appelle, circa 1910

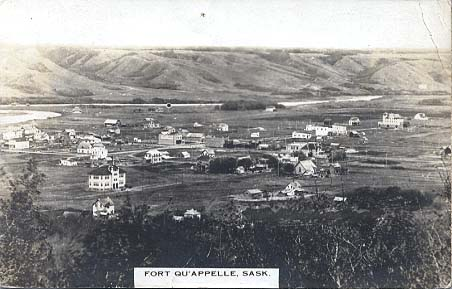
Fort Qu'Appelle, circa 1910

== Industrial land uses ==
=== Moose Jaw-Regina industrial corridor ===
The Moose Jaw-Regina Industrial Corridor holds about 24% of Saskatchewan's population and also 20% of the gross domestic product (GDP) of the province. The corridor interlinks the cities of Regina and Moose Jaw, crossing six more municipalities in between—the villages of Pense, Grand Coulee, and Belle Plaine, and the Rural Municipalities of Moose Jaw No. 161, Pense No. 160 and Sherwood No. 159. It is adjacent to the four-lane Trans-Canada Highway and two railways — Canadian Pacific Kansas City and Canadian National Railway, providing access to the east and west markets and also to the United States.

=== Suitability of the corridor for industry use ===
The corridor is a well-established area for development; many international corporations have located their subsidiaries there for a number of reasons. First, its location on the Trans-Canada Highway, with Canadian Pacific Kansas City and Canadian National allows direct access to markets across Canada and to the United States. The close proximity to the Global Transportation Hub, one of Canada's inland ports, feeds material to and from the U.S. border. Furthermore, the Belle Plaine area is considered one of the top four heavy industrial sites in North America. The flatness of the land, with easy access to water, natural gas and electrical power is beneficial for industry. It is also near two of the fastest-growing urban centres in Saskatchewan—Regina and Moose Jaw–which provides easy access to airports for business. Lastly, the area is ideal because of the presence of vast high-quality reserves of potash.

=== Industries in the corridor ===
The Regina–Moose Jaw Industrial Corridor mostly relies on agriculture and agri-value processing, fertilizer production and mining, and energy. This area has experienced massive industrial construction over the last few years. Some of the industrial projects in the corridor include mining, pipelines, railway, and agriculture as well as fertilizer, ethanol, and salt plants.

- Fertilizer: Yara Fertilizer is one of the largest producers of granular urea in North America. The company is in the industrial park of Belle Plaine. Alpine Plant Foods, the leader in liquid fertilizer production in Canada is also in this industrial park.
- Ethanol: Terra Grain Fuels produces ethanol in the corridor. The company's ethanol plant has a capacity of approximately 150 million litres (33 million imperial gallons) of ethanol annually and 163,800 tonnes of dried distillers' grains annually.
- Salt: K+S Windsor Salt LTD operates a plant at Belle Plaine. This company produces and distributes salt-based products for multiple uses, such as agricultural, industrial, and household uses.

=== Mining production in the Qu'Appelle Valley corridor and impacts ===
Saskatchewan's potash production is heavily concentrated in the Qu'Appelle Valley corridor. As of 2013 there are six mines operating and eight mines in the proposal stage in the Qu'Appelle River Watershed. Mines in this area access the water necessary for production from three different source points—the Qu'Appelle River system itself, groundwater, and Lake Diefenbaker (which comes from the Saskatoon South East Water Supply System—SSEWS). Because potash operations are reliant on water sources, this area of Saskatchewan is very attractive for potash production.

=== Pipelines in the Qu'Appelle Valley ===
There are two major pipelines that run through the Qu'Appelle Valley Corridor. The first is the TransCanada Mainline system that runs from the border of Alberta and Saskatchewan, straight through to Manitoba, Ontario and part of Quebec. This pipeline is owned by TransCanada Pipelines Limited. The second is the Enbridge Mainline System. Owned by Enbridge Pipelines Inc., this system is used to transport petroleum products as well as natural gas liquids from Western Canada across to Manitoba and down into the United States. An initiative in 2015 by the Nature Conservancy of Canada worked to create safe and ecosystem friendly hiking trails that follow the pipeline routes in order to bring awareness to the fragile ecosystem of the Qu'Appelle Valley.

=== Railway in the Qu'Appelle Valley ===
Canadian Pacific Kansas City (CPKC) provides transportation for oil, grain, consumer products, fertilizers, etc. through the Qu'Appelle Valley and all of Saskatchewan. The CPKC Belle Plaine Railway Spur was developed to transport potash from the Belle Plaine mine to market, which was done by adding 30.3 kilometres (18.8 mi) of rail from the mine site to the Kalium Spur near Belle Plaine. This construction was intensive and caused many million cubic metres (tens of million cubic feet) of excavation in order to build the rail beds into farmland and surrounding valley walls. Excavation occurred in areas of the valley that affected aquifers and the Qu'Appelle River, as well as the addition of a steel tunnel to allow for traffic to travel over the spur. Another addition to the landscape was 2,900 metres (9,500 ft) of culvert to mitigate flooding and manage drainage around the track structure.

==== Railway impacts ====
===== Belle Plaine Spur =====
The Belle Plaine Spur was created to facilitate the transportation of potash from the K+S Bethune Legacy mine to various markets across the country. This was done by connecting the new railway from the mine near Findlater to the existing railway, known as the Kalium Spur, near the community of Belle Plaine. While the construction of the spur did promise to create greater economic opportunities in terms of marketing potash, there were major environmental impacts on this section of the Qu'Appelle Valley. During construction, there were enormous amounts of dirt and earth moved to facilitate the rail bed. The rail bed was built by KPCL Dirt Movers who estimate that during the construction phase, 9 million cubic metres (12 million cubic yards) of earth was excavated and there was 7.5 million cubic metres (9.8 million cubic yards) of embankment construction.

===== Belle Plaine Spur impacts =====
The railway chose the shortest and most direct route to the Legacy Mine in order to limit the potential impacts on local watersheds and archeological sites, as well as the smallest amount of communities, residents and sensitive environmental areas. In the project application, the railway points to the fact that half of the corridor is already being used as intensive cropland, which means that the native terrain and ecosystems of that area have already been disturbed. By choosing this route, environmental impacts are arguably limited because they are developing in an area that is not considered sensitive. Both the South and North valley walls were cut into, including cuts over 25 metres (82 ft) deep on the South wall, and up to 35 metres (115 ft) deep on the North wall. Not only was vegetation and earth disturbed in this process, but a number of aquifers were cut through in the South valley wall. Cuts through aquifers within the valley posed issues of drainage and erosion, and the creation of steeper embankments caused by excavation and rail grade construction created slope instability in the valley. The natural state of the valley has been altered significantly, and with this came the need for infrastructure implementation in order to accommodate drainage and crossings during the construction phase and into the future. This included concrete box culverts that were installed on the bottom of the river valley in order to allow excess floodwaters to continue to flow uninhibited. A report was made in February 2015 that acknowledged 23 landowners that relied on the aquifers—5 of whom were listed as potentially affected by the cuts on the South slope of the Valley. In order to ensure that existing cultural sites which have not been already disturbed by agriculture and other industry were not affected, a Heritage Resources Impact Assessment (HRIA) was conducted. Upon assessment, experts determined that this site had low potential for the discovery of cultural sites due to the agricultural disruption that occurred prior. Two historically significant sites were found within the footprint of the spur, and under direction from the Saskatchewan Heritage Conservation Branch there has been additional archeological work performed which resulted in controlled excavation and recovery of historical material.

=== Agriculture ===
Agriculture has contributed to the increase of metal contamination in the Qu'Appelle watershed due to "agricultural tilling, irrigation, and use of chemicals." This metal then accumulates in lake sediment, which will then impact the aquatic food webs within the lake. Peter Leavitt from the University of Regina states that this accumulation of metal toxins has occurred in the eggs of small aquatic invertebrates for 100 years.

== Gallery ==
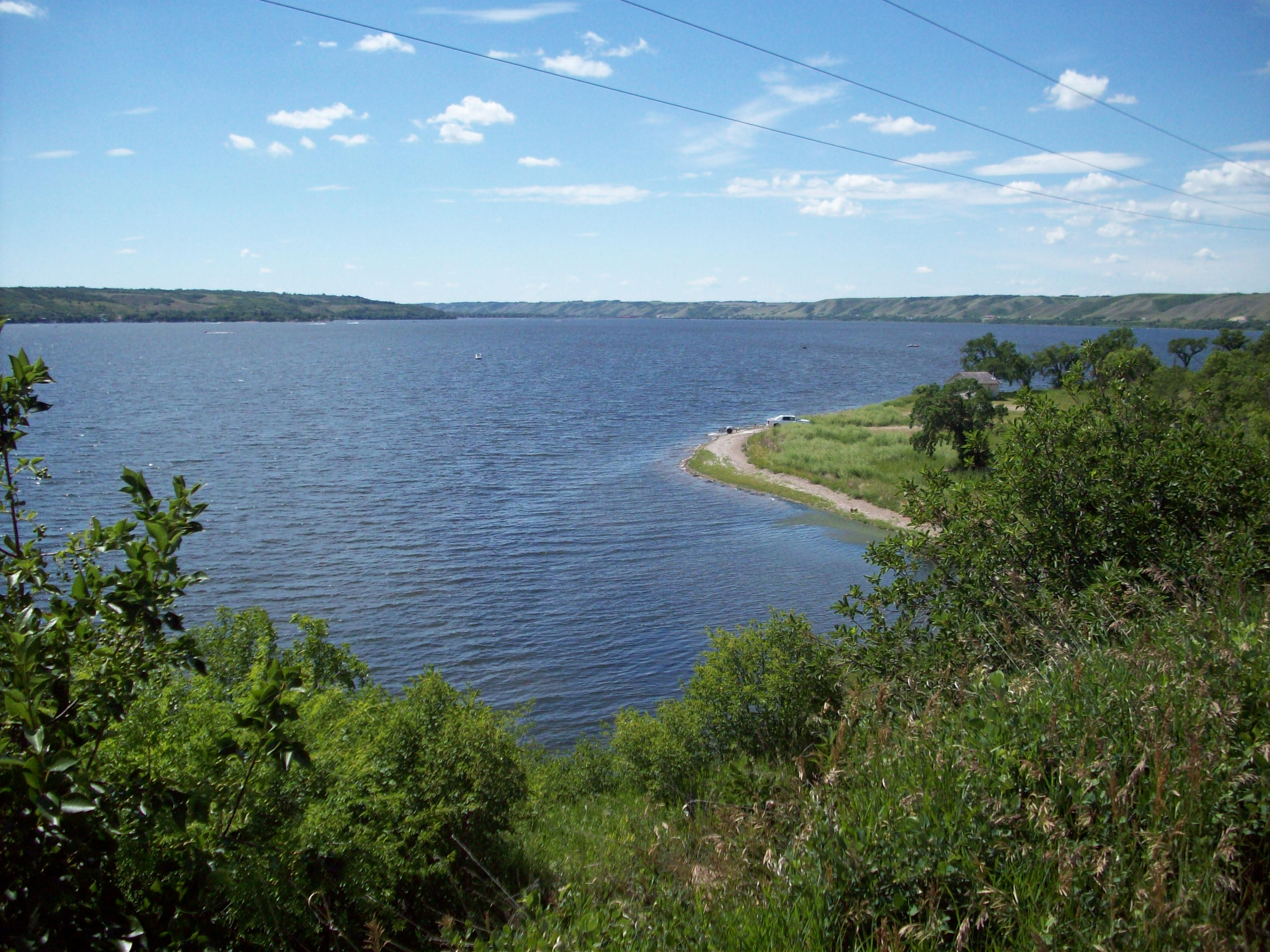
Echo Lake, south shore

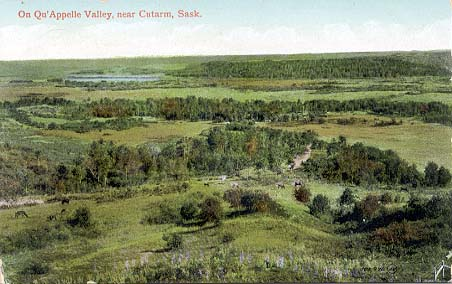
Qu'Appelle Valley near Cutarm, 1910

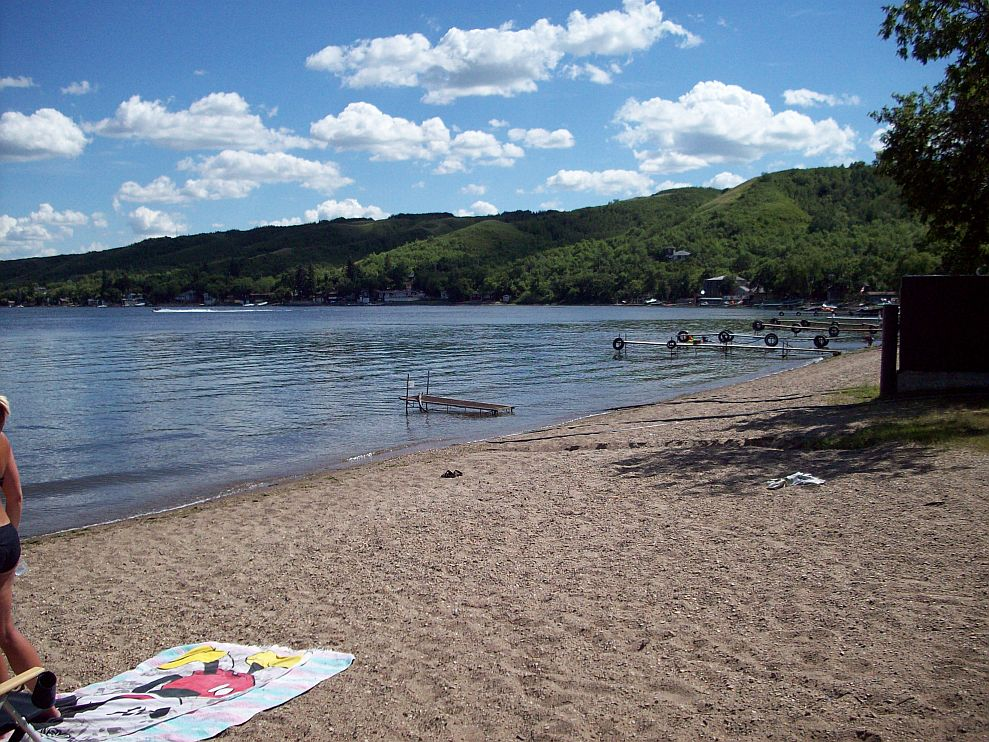
B-Say-Tah Point on Echo Lake in the Qu'Appelle Valley, a popular holiday resort and commuter community for Reginans since the 1880s

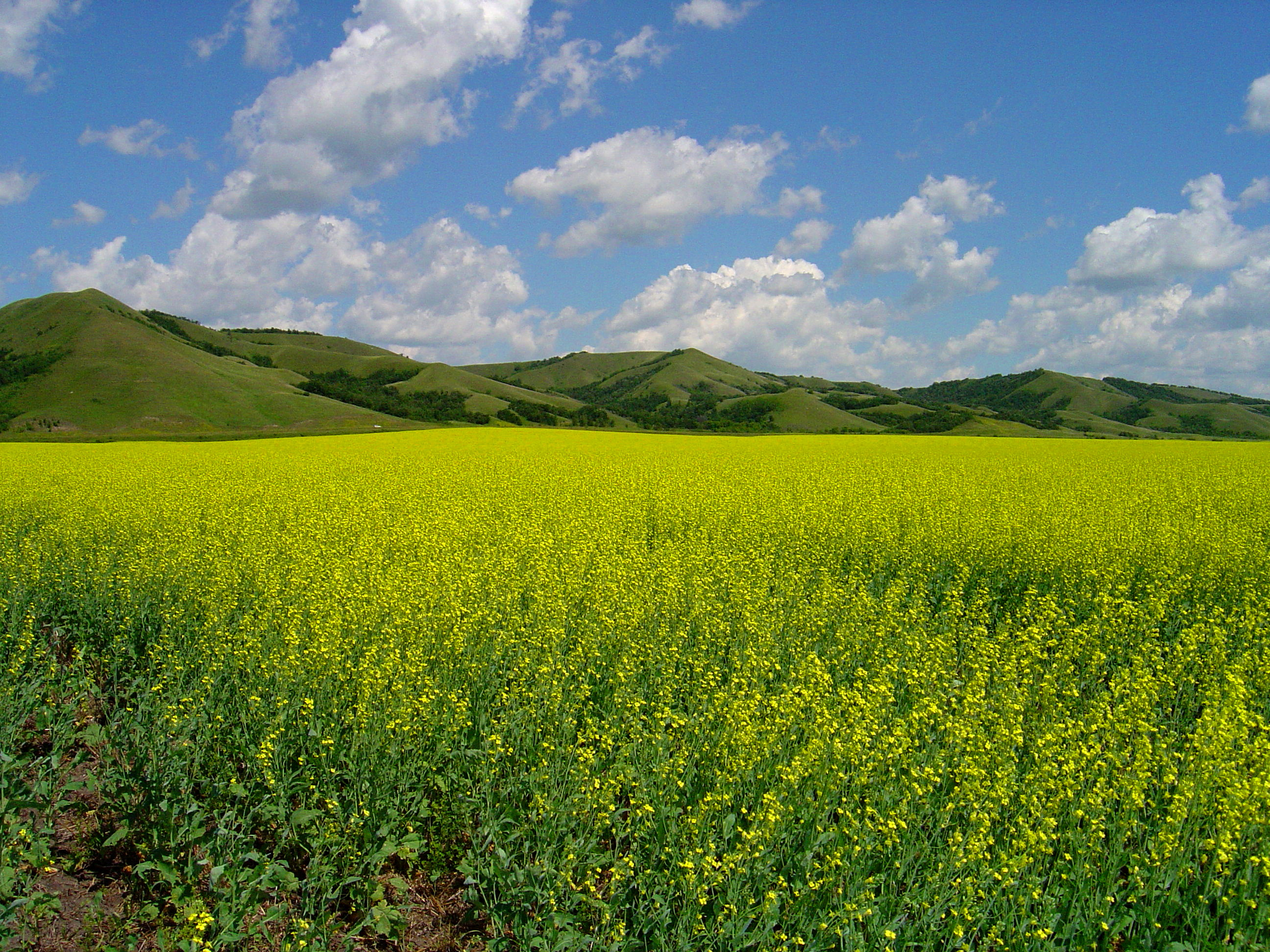
The Qu'Appelle Valley under cultivation in South East Saskatchewan

== See also ==
- List of rivers of Saskatchewan
- List of rivers of Manitoba
- Qu'Appelle (disambiguation)
