= Qu'Appelle River Dam =

Dam in Saskatchewan, Canada

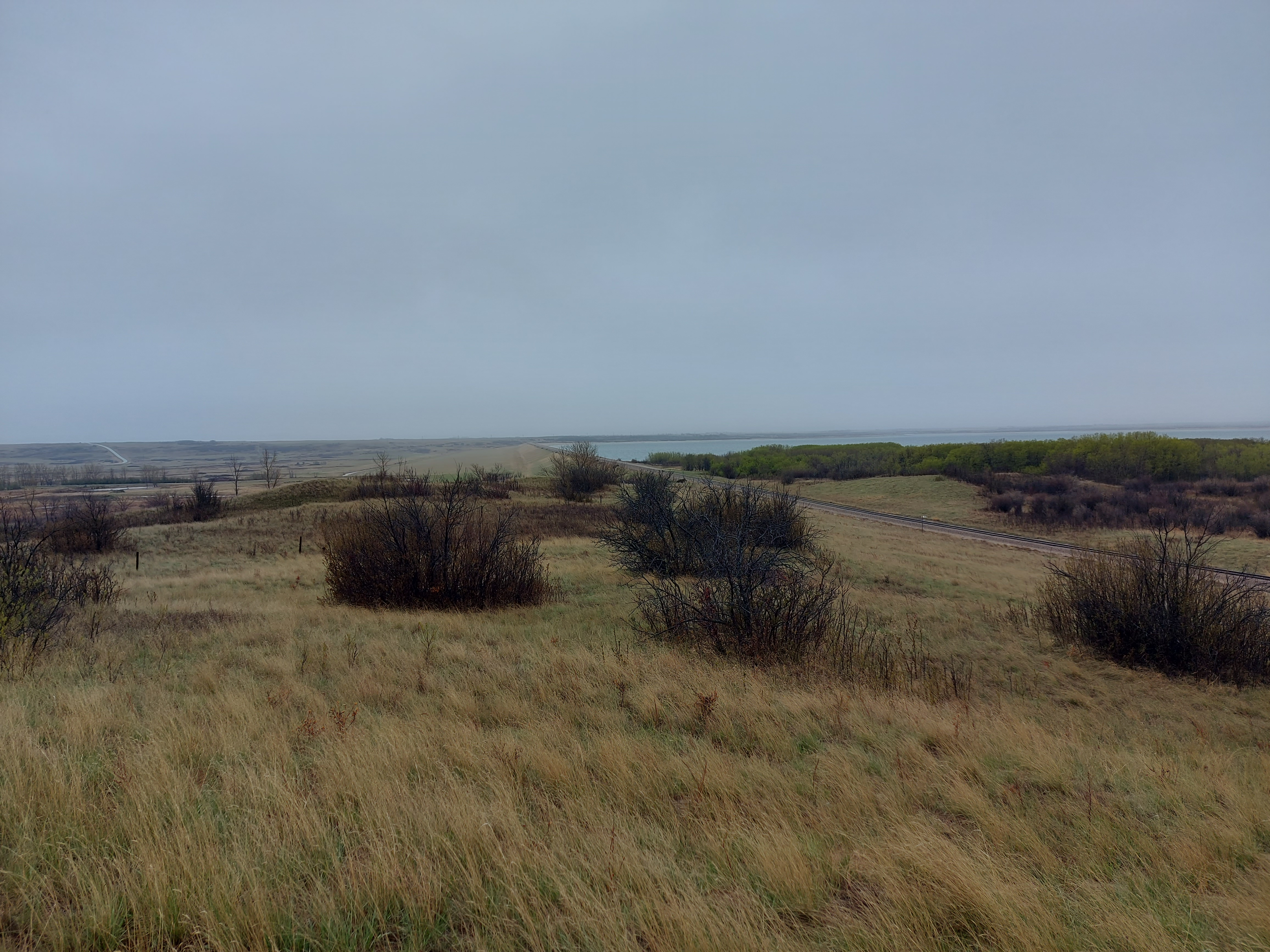
- Qu'Appelle River Dam

- Location in Saskatchewan Qu'Appelle River Dam (Canada)
- Location: RM of Maple Bush No. 224, Saskatchewan, Canada
- Coordinates: 50°58′57″N 106°25′57″W
- Construction began: 1959
- Opening date: 1967
- Owner: Saskatchewan Water Security Agency

Dam and spillways
- Type of dam: Embankment dam
- Height: 27.4 m (90 ft)
- Length: 3,100 m (10,200 ft)
- Spillway capacity: 1,400 m^{3} (49,000 cu ft) per second

Reservoir
- Creates: Lake Diefenbaker
- Total capacity: 9,400,000 dam^{3} (7,600,000 acre⋅ft)
- Catchment area: 126,000 km^{2} (49,000 sq mi)
- Maximum water depth: 58 m (190 ft)

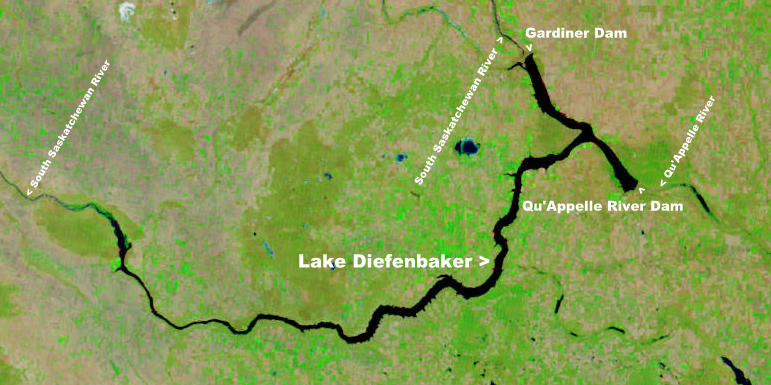
NASA satellite image of Lake Diefenbaker showing the Qu'Appelle River Dam at the southeast end and the Gardiner Dam at the northeast end

The Qu'appelle River Dam is the smaller of two embankment dams along the South Saskatchewan River that created Lake Diefenbaker in the Canadian province of Saskatchewan. The bigger of the two dams is Gardiner Dam, which is the third largest embankment dam in Canada and one of the largest in the world. Construction of both dams began in 1959 and was completed in 1967. Lake Diefenbaker is the largest lake in southern Saskatchewan.

The dam is the source of the Qu'Appelle River and it keeps the flow of water down the river relatively constant. Formerly, the Qu'Appelle River dried up in many places every summer at the conclusion of the spring freshet from the Rocky Mountains. Constant, steady flows down the Qu'Appelle River are important as downstream there are several smaller dams and reservoirs that supply water for irrigation, industry (such as the Mosaic potash mine at Belle Plaine), and drinking water for cities such as Regina and Moose Jaw. The dam is 3,100 metres (10,200 ft) long, 27.4 metres (90 ft) high, and, along with the Gardiner Dam, holds back a reservoir that contains 9,400,000 dam^{3} (7,600,000 acre⋅ft) of water.

== Qu'Appelle River ==
During the time of glaciation on North America, the retreating glacier would block the flow north and would force the water flow down the Qu'Appelle River. When the glaciers retreated further, water would then flow north. Before the Gardiner Dam was built, spring flows were high enough to allow water down the Qu'Appelle but would dry up later in the fall. Now as the Qu'Appelle Dam always retains the water of Lake Diefenbaker, water is released into the Qu'Appelle River in order to maintain flows throughout the entire year. This serves the farmers along the Qu'Appelle who use it for irrigation and watering their livestock.

There are multiple dams and lakes along the Qu'Appelle River as it meanders through the glacial meltwater-carved Qu'Appelle Valley en route to its mouth at the Assiniboine River in Manitoba. These lakes and dams provide a stable water source for consumption and recreation. Some of these include Eyebrow Lake, Buffalo Pound Lake, Craven Dam, the Fishing Lakes, Crooked Lake, and Round Lake.

== Tourism and access ==
Public access to the Qu'Appelle Dam is from a scenic viewpoint that provides views of the dam itself, Lake Diefenbaker, and the Qu'Appelle Valley. A short road from Highway 19 leads to the viewpoint. Along the top of the dam runs the Canadian Pacific Railway; the dam was designed with this type of loading in mind.

Douglas Provincial Park (named after former premier of Saskatchewan Tommy Douglas) extends from the dam to the community of Mistusinne to the north. Lake Diefenbaker has over 800 kilometres (500 mi) of shoreline and around the lake there are many communities, parks, and recreational facilities, such as campgrounds, beaches, golf courses, and marinas.

== See also ==
- Saskatchewan Water Security Agency
- List of dams in Saskatchewan
