= Taylor Beach =

Hamlet in Saskatchewan, Canada

Coordinates: 50°41′41″N 103°38′42″W

Taylor Beach is a hamlet in the Canadian province of Saskatchewan.

Taylor Beach is located in the RM of North Qu'Appelle No. 187 on the north side of a point of land on the western shore of Katepwa Lake, directly across from Katepwa Beach and Katepwa Point Provincial Park. Directly south of Taylor Beach, on the other side of the point, is Lake View Beach.

== Demographics ==
In the 2021 Census of Population conducted by Statistics Canada, Taylor Beach had a population of 48 living in 26 of its 64 total private dwellings, a change of -17.2% from its 2016 population of 58. With a land area of 0.37 km^{2} (0.14 sq mi), it had a population density of 129.7/km^{2} (336.0/sq mi) in 2021.

== See also ==
- List of hamlets in Saskatchewan
- List of designated places in Saskatchewan
- List of communities in Saskatchewan
