= Kenlis =

Community in Saskatchewan, Canada

- Hamlet
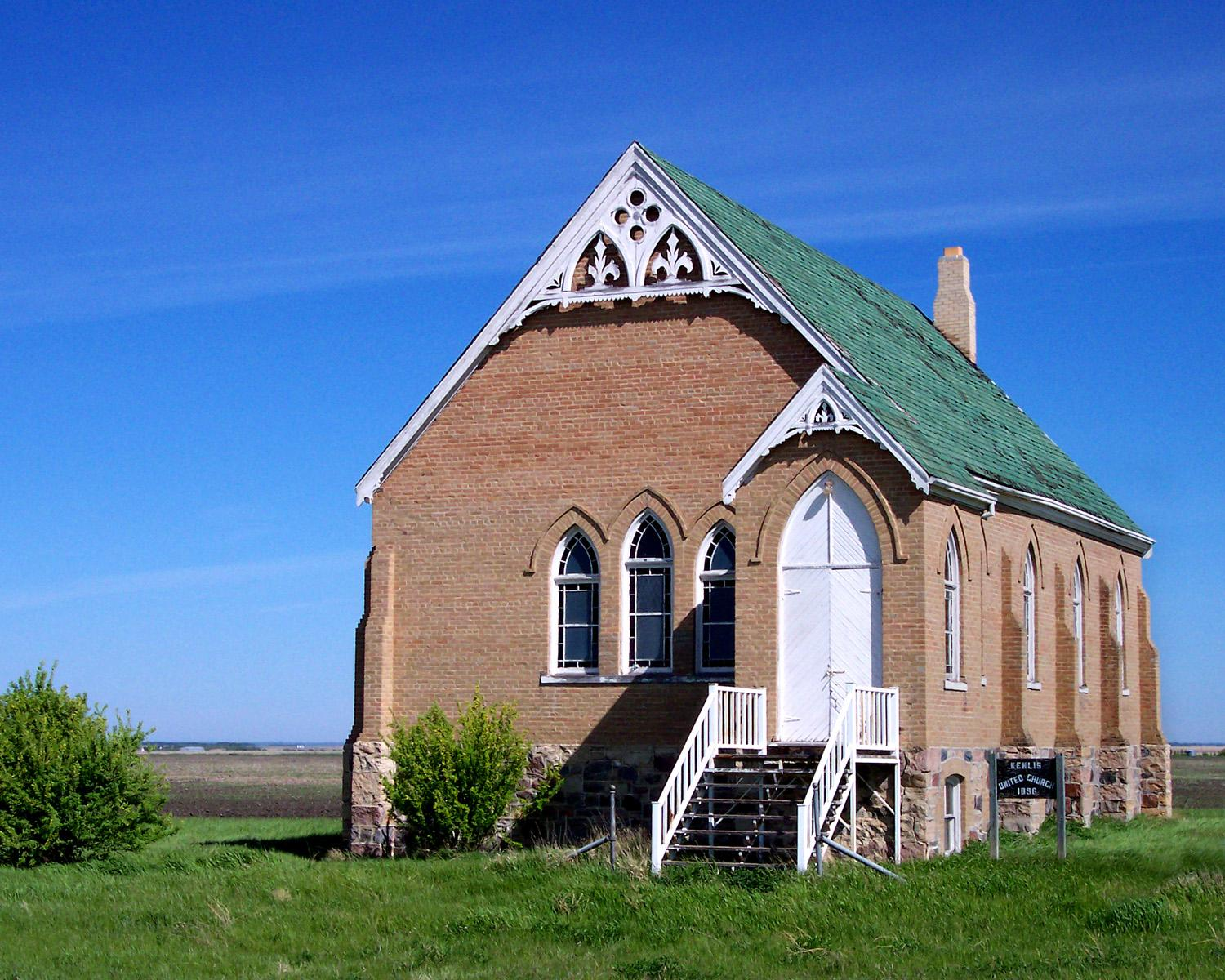
- Kenlis United Church

- Location within Saskatchewan Location within Canada
- Coordinates: 50.444°N 103.252°W
- Country: Canada
- Province: Saskatchewan
- Region: Southwest
- Census division: 6
- Rural municipality: Abernethy No. 186
- Established: 1880s

Government
  - Administrator: Thom Barker
  - Governing body: Abernethy No. 186
- Time zone: CST
- Postal code: S0A 0A0
- Area code: 306
- Historic Sites: Kenlis United Church

Kenlis is a small farming community in the Rural Municipality of Abernethy No. 186, Saskatchewan, Canada. The community is located 10 kilometres (6.2 mi) south of the village of Abernethy close to the Qu'appelle Valley on range road 112 about 15 kilometres (9.3 mi) northeast of the town of Indian Head.

== History ==
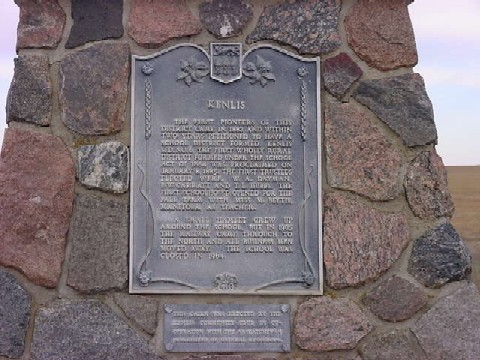

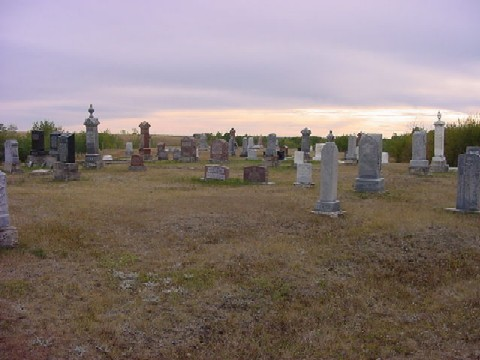
Cairn Memorial

When the Canadian Pacific Railway constructed tracks through the village of Abernethy many residents and businesses from Kenis moved to be closer to the rail line. The Kenlis United Church and a Cairn Memorial to the school are still located on the former town site. Every summer the congregation from the United Church in Abernethy have a service in the old Kenlis Church. The Kenlis cemetery also still exists approximately two miles to the north with occasional burials still taking place.

== See also ==
- List of communities in Saskatchewan
- List of hamlets in Saskatchewan
