= Bell Farm (Indian Head, Saskatchewan) =

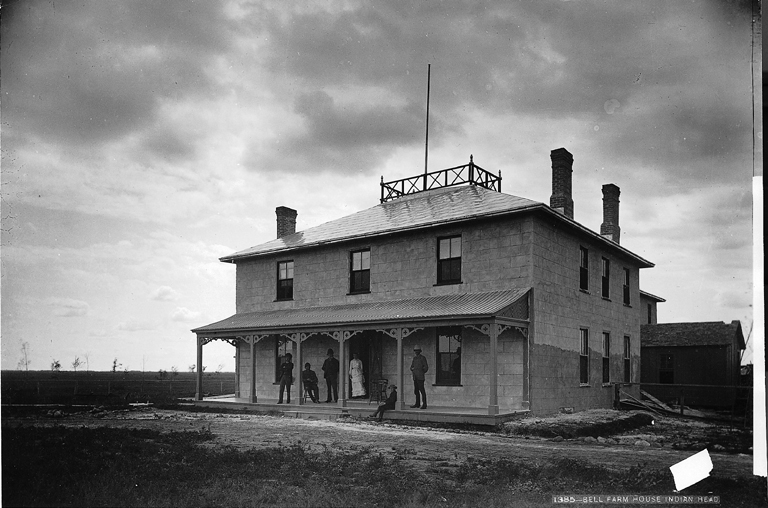
- Major Bell's farm house in 1884; from Notman Photographic Archives
- Interactive map of the Bell Farm area

General information
- Status: Reconstructed
- Architectural style: Round Barn
- Location: Indian Head, Saskatchewan, Canada
- Coordinates: 50°33′6.84″N 103°40′46.92″W
- Construction started: 1882
- Renovated: July 24, 2010
- Demolished: April 2008

Dimensions
- Diameter: 67 feet (20 m)

Technical details
- Structural system: Limestone

Bell Farm is a heritage farm built in 1882 by William Robert Bell on ten miles (16 km) square or 60,000 acres (24,000 ha) at Indian Head in Saskatchewan. The Bell Farm Barn is amongst the ten top most endangered sites by the Heritage Canada Foundation. The round structure consisted of a silo which could be used also as a lookout tower. The silo had a capacity of 4,000 bushels of oats and 100 tons of hay. The surrounding area could house 36 horse and an office. Having the silo centrally located greatly reduced labour involved in livestock feeding and resulted in a stronger facility than the rectangular structures.

The first settlers moved into the district in 1882, a few months ahead of the Canadian Pacific Railway. The farming operations were so huge and out of the ordinary that, on many occasions, the passenger trains would stop and let the passengers watch the harvesting operation becoming the area's first tourist attraction.

== Operations ==
The first buildings constructed were the 16-room, two-story stone house measuring 34 by 40 feet (10 m × 12 m) with a 23 by 44 feet (7.0 m × 13.4 m) wing. Four stone and two frame five-room cottages, complemented the main dwelling along with an ice house, a cow barn, and a chicken house. The farm was divided into 200-acre (0.81 km^{2}) portions with a foreman supervising each section. Houses and buildings were built at each area with phone lines connecting the entirety. The phone lines between the 23 cottages on the farm was one of the first two phone lines in the North West Territories. In 1886 the Bell Farm owned 45 reapers, and binders, 78 ploughs, 6 mowers, 40 seeders, 80 sets of harrows and seven steam threshing outfits to plant and harvest 5,000 acres (20 km^{2}) of Red Fyfe wheat, oats and potatoes crop. The Bell Farm was a mixed farm enterprise, and the livestock of 1886 comprised 200 horses, 250 cattle and 900 hogs. Wooden granaries on wheels, grain elevator and flour mill also complemented the Bell Farm.

Major Bell erected a 12,000-dollar building for an Agricultural College to bring in Dr. Tanner, a noted professor of agriculture. The building was all that materialized from this plan.

== Bell Barn Society ==
Dave Aldous began a campaign to save the Bell Farm when the mortar holding the stones of the Bell Farm House decayed, and the farm house collapsed. A letter from Dave Aldous reached Frank Korvemaker, a provincial heritage official. Korvemaker wrote a book on stone buildings, Legacy of Stone:Saskatchewan's Stone Buildings by Margaret Hryniuk, Frank Korvemaker, and Larry Easton, and from there went on to establish the Bell Barn Society to preserve this historic barn. Korvemaker has had experience with the Saskatchewan Heritage Foundation and was instrumental in preserving the Claybank Brick Plant National Historic Site. Margaret Hryniuk, Frank Korvemaker, and Larry Easton contacted the barn's owner, Dan Walker in 2005.

The Bell Barn Society of Indian Head was founded in 2006 to raise public awareness, and financial support to restore the Bell Farm Round Barn. The campaign received $50,000 from James Richardson International (JRI) towards rebuilding the Bell Farm barn and establishing an interpretive centre for Western Canadian Agriculture. JRI, a Winnipeg company, recently celebrated 150 years of business in Canada. The effort has been supported by the Heritage Canada foundation, the Saskatchewan Architectural Heritage Society, United Empire Loyalies, local historians, schools and businesses.

In April 2008, the 126-year-old stone farm was dismantled rock by rock. The ground has been leveled to reconstruct the building and engineers will be consulted for depth of piles needed for support. 5 acres (2.0 ha) of land was acquired from the rural municipality (RM) of Indian Head. The town of Indian Head will own the reconstructed site, picnic, and parking facilities. A sheet-metal roof with 30 square air vents for light and ventilation, surrounds an 8-sided cupola in the center which was the upper extension of the silo and look-out tower. The original barn had a herringbone-pattern wood frame on trusses extending from the center to the stone walls. Reconstruction of the barn alone is estimated at $1 million. An 1883 Bell Farm cottage has been preserved at the Indian Head Museum. The provincial and federal governments will not commit to designating the barn with heritage status as it will not be re-constructed on its precise original site. The original site of the Bell Farm will be preserved with the lower one foot of the original building for archaeological findings. The roof and north wall had already collapsed due to a heavy snowfall during the winter of 2005–2006.
