= Notman Photographic Archives =

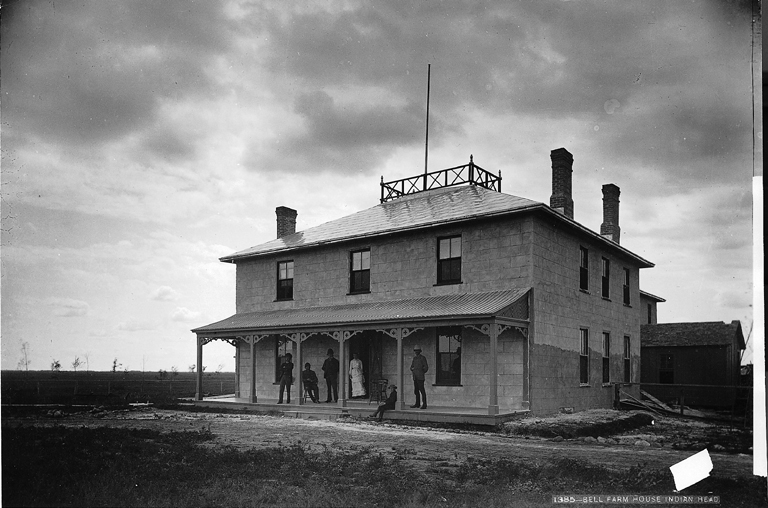
Major Bell's farm house, Bell Farm (Indian Head, Saskatchewan) (1884)

The Notman Photographic Archives (French: Archives photographiques Notman) is an archive of photographic images originally collected by photographer William Notman. It is conserved by the McCord Museum of Canadian History in Montreal, Quebec. Institutions and researchers worldwide consult the archives. Through its thousands of images—landscapes, well-known people, families, places, events, and activities—these historically invaluable archives provide a visual history of Montreal, Quebec and Canada from the 1840s to the present. As well as the iconographical data bank of 1,250,000 photographs, the archives include various items of early photographic equipment and accessories.

== Profile ==
More than 450,000 photographs (including 200,000 glass negatives), were taken by the Notman studio during its 78 years of operation. Each glass negative is accompanied by a print that is identified, listed and classified in numerical order in one of 200 albums, and in alphabetical order in one of 43 other albums. The principal period of this archive is 1840–1935. About 800,000 images taken by other photographers (from the 19th century to the present), including such known figures as Alexander Henderson and John Taylor.

A small but important collection of photographic equipment.

== See also ==
- List of museums devoted to one photographer
