= Rural Municipality of Abernethy No. 186 =

Rural municipality in Saskatchewan, Canada

Abernethy No. 186
- Rural municipality
- Rural Municipality of Abernethy No. 186
- Location of the RM of Abernethy No. 186 in Saskatchewan
- Coordinates: 50.639°N 103.485°W
- Country: Canada
- Province: Saskatchewan
- Census division: 6
- SARM division: 1
- Federal riding: Regina—Qu'Appelle
- Provincial riding: Last Mountain-Touchwood
- Formed: December 11, 1911

Government
  - Reeve: John Fishley
  - Governing body: RM of Abernethy No. 186 Council
  - Administrator: Karissa Lingelbach
  - Office location: Abernethy

Area (2016)
  - Land: 779.42 km^{2} (300.94 sq mi)

Population (2016)
  - Total: 362
  - Density: 0.5/km^{2} (1.3/sq mi)
- Time zone: CST
  - Summer (DST): CST
- Postal code: S0A 0A0
- Area codes: 306 and 639

The Rural Municipality of Abernethy No. 186 (2016 population: 362) is a rural municipality (RM) in the Canadian province of Saskatchewan within Census Division No. 6 and SARM Division No. 1. It is located on the Qu'Appelle River.

== History ==
The RM of Abernethy No. 186 incorporated as a rural municipality on December 11, 1911.

== Geography ==
=== Communities and localities ===
The following urban municipalities are surrounded by the RM.

Towns

- Balcarres

Villages

- Abernethy

Resort villages

- Katepwa
  - Katepwa Beach, dissolved as a resort village and amalgamated into Resort Village of the District of Katepwa, July 24, 2004
  - Katepwa South, dissolved as a resort village and amalgamated into Resort Village of the District of Katepwa, July 24, 2004
  - Sandy Beach, dissolved as a resort village and amalgamated into Resort Village of the District of Katepwa, July 24, 2004

The following unincorporated communities are within the RM.

Localities

- Blackwood
- Kenlis
- Lorlie

=== Lakes and rivers ===
Along the southwest boundary of the RM is Katepwa Lake, which is one of the four Fishing Lakes in the Qu'Appelle Valley. The rest of the southern border follows the Qu'Appelle River.

== Demographics ==
Population history (1981–2016)
Year	Pop.	±%
1981	652	—
1986	610	−6.4%
1991	515	−15.6%
1996	497	−3.5%
2001	433	−12.9%
2006	375	−13.4%
2011	387	+3.2%
2016	362	−6.5%
Source: Statistics Canada via Saskatchewan Bureau of Statistics

In the 2021 Census of Population conducted by Statistics Canada, the RM of Abernethy No. 186 had a population of 337 living in 144 of its 165 total private dwellings, a change of −6.9% from its 2016 population of 362. With a land area of 763.11 km^{2} (294.64 sq mi), it had a population density of 0.4/km^{2} (1.1/sq mi) in 2021.

In the 2016 Census of Population, the RM of Abernethy No. 186 recorded a population of 362 living in 150 of its 196 total private dwellings, a −6.5% change from its 2011 population of 387. With a land area of 779.42 km^{2} (300.94 sq mi), it had a population density of 0.5/km^{2} (1.2/sq mi) in 2016.

== Attractions ==
- Motherwell Homestead, a National Historic Site of Canada
- Katepwa Point Provincial Park

== Government ==
The RM of Abernethy No. 186 is governed by an elected municipal council and an appointed administrator that meets on the second Tuesday of every month. The reeve of the RM is John Fishley while its administrator is Karissa Lingelbach . The RM's office is located in Abernethy.

== Transportation ==
Rail

- Brandon-Virden-Saskatoon Section C.P.R. – serves Neudorf, Lemberg, Abernethy, Balcarres, Patrick

Roads

- Highway 22—serves Balcarres, Saskatchewan [west]
- Highway 10—serves Balcarres, Saskatchewan [east]
- Highway 310—serves Balcarres, Saskatchewan [north]
- Highway 619—serves Balcarres, Saskatchewan [south]

== See also ==
- List of rural municipalities in Saskatchewan
