= Motherwell Homestead =

National historic site in Saskatchewan, Canada

Coordinates: 50°43′08″N 103°25′30″W

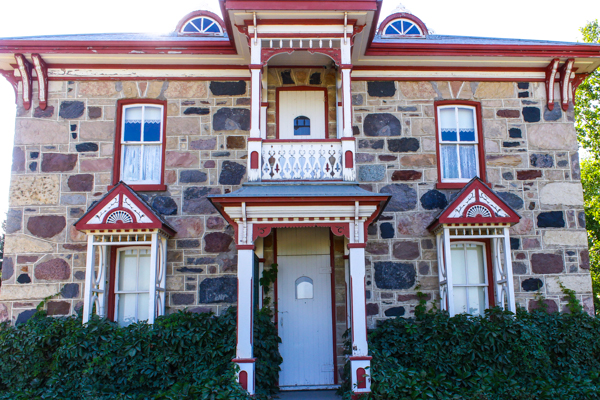
- Motherwell Homestead
- Interactive map of Motherwell Homestead
- Type: Homestead
- Location: Abernethy No. 186, Saskatchewan, Canada
- Built: 1882
- Architectural style: Field Stone – Italianate
- Governing body: Private Residence

National Historic Site of Canada
- Designated: May 25, 1966

The Motherwell Homestead is a National Historic Site of Canada located just south of the community of Abernethy, Saskatchewan. The site commemorates the life and achievements of William Richard Motherwell, Saskatchewan's first minister of agriculture and federal minister of agriculture for the Mackenzie King government.

The homestead's fieldstone house, called Lanark Place after Motherwell's previous Ontario home, is modelled after similar farmsteads built in Ontario. The homestead is surrounded by a shelter belt.

The 3.59-hectare (8.9-acre) farmstead, in addition to the main house, includes fields defined by fences and shelter belt shrub and tree lines, and agricultural buildings.

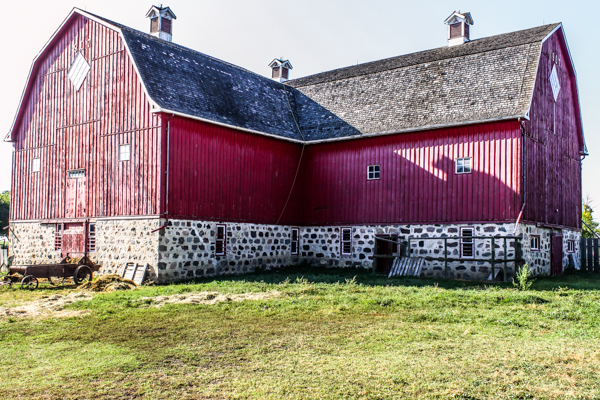
Motherwell barn (1907)

Visitors to the park are immersed in 1907 agriculture. The Motherwell house, barn and outbuildings have been restored to their 1907 appearance. Employees at the park dress in period clothing. During operational months (May 21 to September 1), livestock, including hogs, cows, and chickens, are on site.

The Friends of the Motherwell Homestead operate a restaurant and gift shop on site.
