= William Robert Bell =

Canadian militia officer, farmer & businessman (1845-1913)

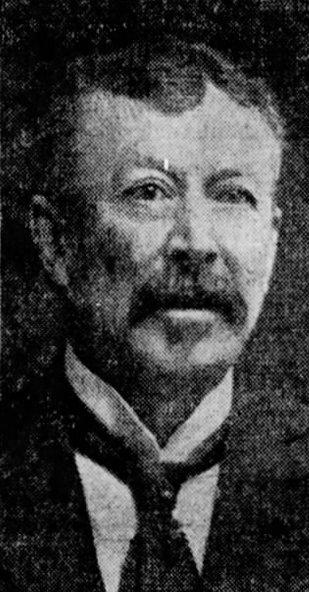
- Born: 28 May 1845; Brockville, Ontario
- Died: 17 February 1913 (aged 67); Winnipeg, Manitoba
- Occupation(s): Militia officer, farmer, businessman

William Robert Bell (28 May 1845 – 17 February 1913) was a militia officer, farmer, and businessman who was born in Brockville, Ontario.

Bell's military history is connected with the Fenian raids of 1866 and 1870 where he achieved the rank of Major.

Bell's most important contributions to history were in the field of agriculture. He was involved at one time in a large-scale agricultural operation, known as the Bell-Kelso Farm, and located in Minnesota. Building on that experience he began a model farm in what is now Indian Head, Saskatchewan. Started in 1882 and encompassing 55,000 acres, it was known as Bell Farm.

He died at his home in Winnipeg on 17 February 1913.
