= Abernethy, Saskatchewan =

Village in Saskatchewan, Canada

Abernethy
- Village
- Village of Abernethy
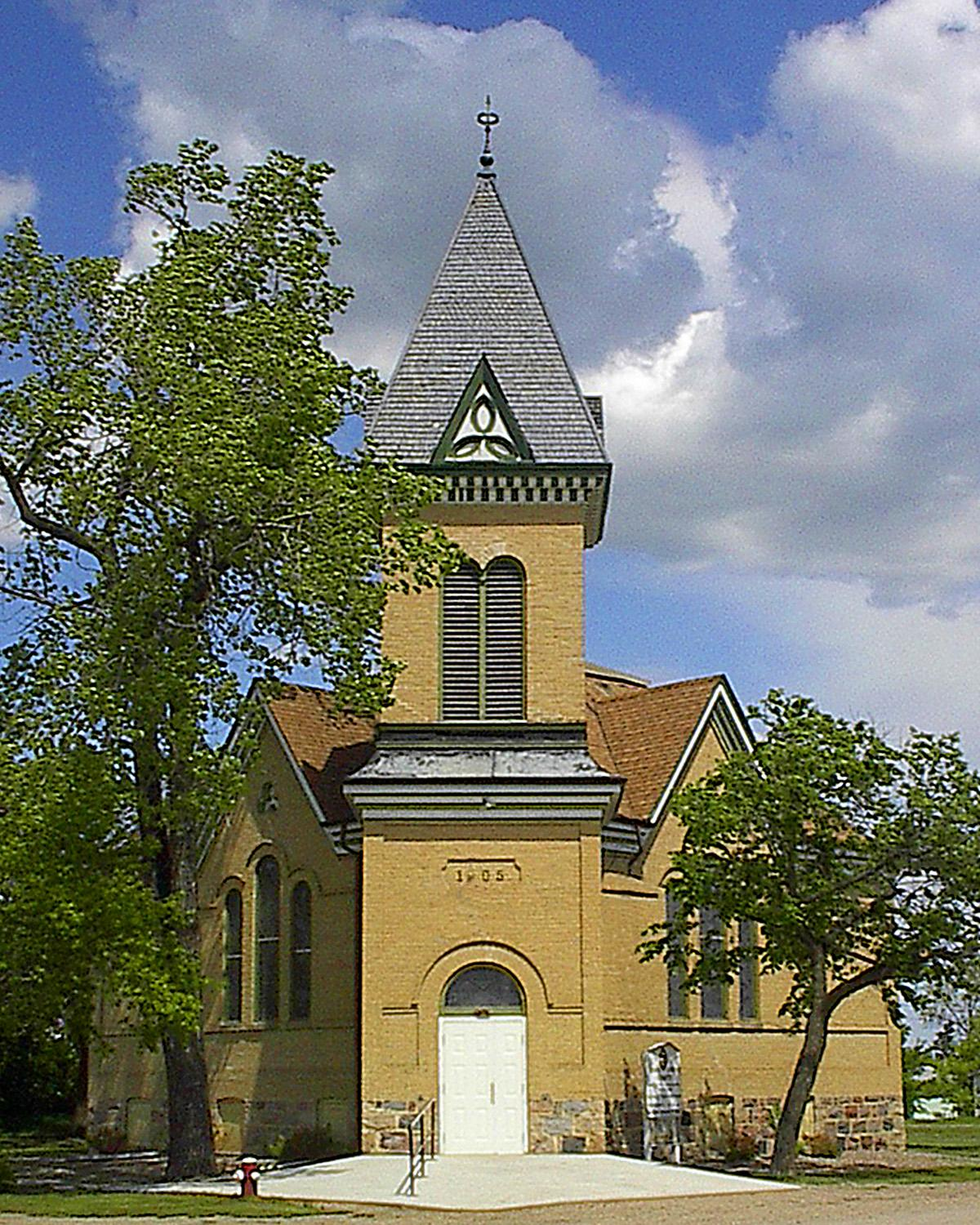
- Abernethy Church

- Location within Saskatchewan Location within Canada
- Coordinates: 50.444°N 103.252°W
- Country: Canada
- Province: Saskatchewan
- Region: Southwest
- Census division: 6
- Rural Municipality: Abernethy No. 186
- Established: 1904

Government
  - Mayor: Kevan Stryker
  - Administrator: Travis Blanchard
  - Governing body: Abernethy Village Council

Area
  - Total: 1.03 km^{2} (0.40 sq mi)

Population (2021)
  - Total: 190
  - Density: 197.7/km^{2} (512/sq mi)
- Time zone: CST
- Postal code: S0A 0A0
- Area codes: 306, 639
- Highways: Highway 22
- Historic Sites: Motherwell Homestead
- Website: Village of Abernethy

Abernethy (2021 population: 190) is a village in the Canadian province of Saskatchewan within the Rural Municipality of Abernethy No. 186 and Census Division No. 6. It is about one hour east of Regina, one hour southwest of Yorkton, and approximately five hours northwest of Winnipeg. To the south of Abernethy lies the Qu'Appelle Valley in which Katepwa Beach is located.

The current mayor is Kevin Stryker, and the village council consists of Janet Englot, Marty Fayant, Mark Harrison, and Colin Ward.

== History ==
Abernethy was incorporated as a village on July 26, 1904. Abernethy celebrated its one hundredth anniversary in the summer of 2004 with a centennial celebration held at the same time as the annual agricultural fair.

=== Historic sites ===
- Abernethy is home to the Motherwell Homestead, which is a National Historic Site and is the original homestead of Saskatchewan's first minister of agriculture W.R. Motherwell.
- Abernethy and District Memorial Hall is a Municipal Heritage Property, that was constructed in 1921, to commemorate the return of soldiers from World War I. Funds for the hall were raised through local donations in the community. The hall was designed by Storey and Van Egmond of Regina.
- Christ Anglican Church is a Municipal Heritage Property, that was constructed near Abernethy in 1886, and relocated into the village in 1904.

== Demographics ==
Population history (1981–2016)
Year	Pop.	±%
1981	300	—
1986	261	−13.0%
1991	243	−6.9%
1996	232	−4.5%
2001	213	−8.2%
2006	197	−7.5%
2011	196	−0.5%
2016	204	+4.1%
2021	190	−6.9%
Source: Statistics Canada via Saskatchewan Bureau of Statistics

In the 2021 Census of Population conducted by Statistics Canada, Abernethy had a population of 190 living in 86 of its 108 total private dwellings, a change of −6.9% from its 2016 population of 204. With a land area of 0.98 km^{2} (0.38 sq mi), it had a population density of 193.9/km^{2} (502.1/sq mi) in 2021.

In the 2016 Census of Population, Abernethy recorded a population of 204 living in 84 of its 104 total private dwellings, a 3.9% change from its 2011 population of 196. With a land area of 1.03 km^{2} (0.40 sq mi), it had a population density of 198.1/km^{2} (513.0/sq mi) in 2016.

== Economy ==
Abernethy is primarily an agricultural community. Businesses in this village include an ice cream store, photographery business, crochet business, as well as a CO-OP gas and grocery store.

== Education ==
For schooling, children are bussed to Lemberg and Neudorf in the east and Balcarres in the west. Abernethy School was closed in 1994.

== See also ==
- List of communities in Saskatchewan
- List of villages in Saskatchewan
