= Katepwa =

Resort village in Saskatchewan, Canada

- Resort village
- Resort Village of the District of Katepwa
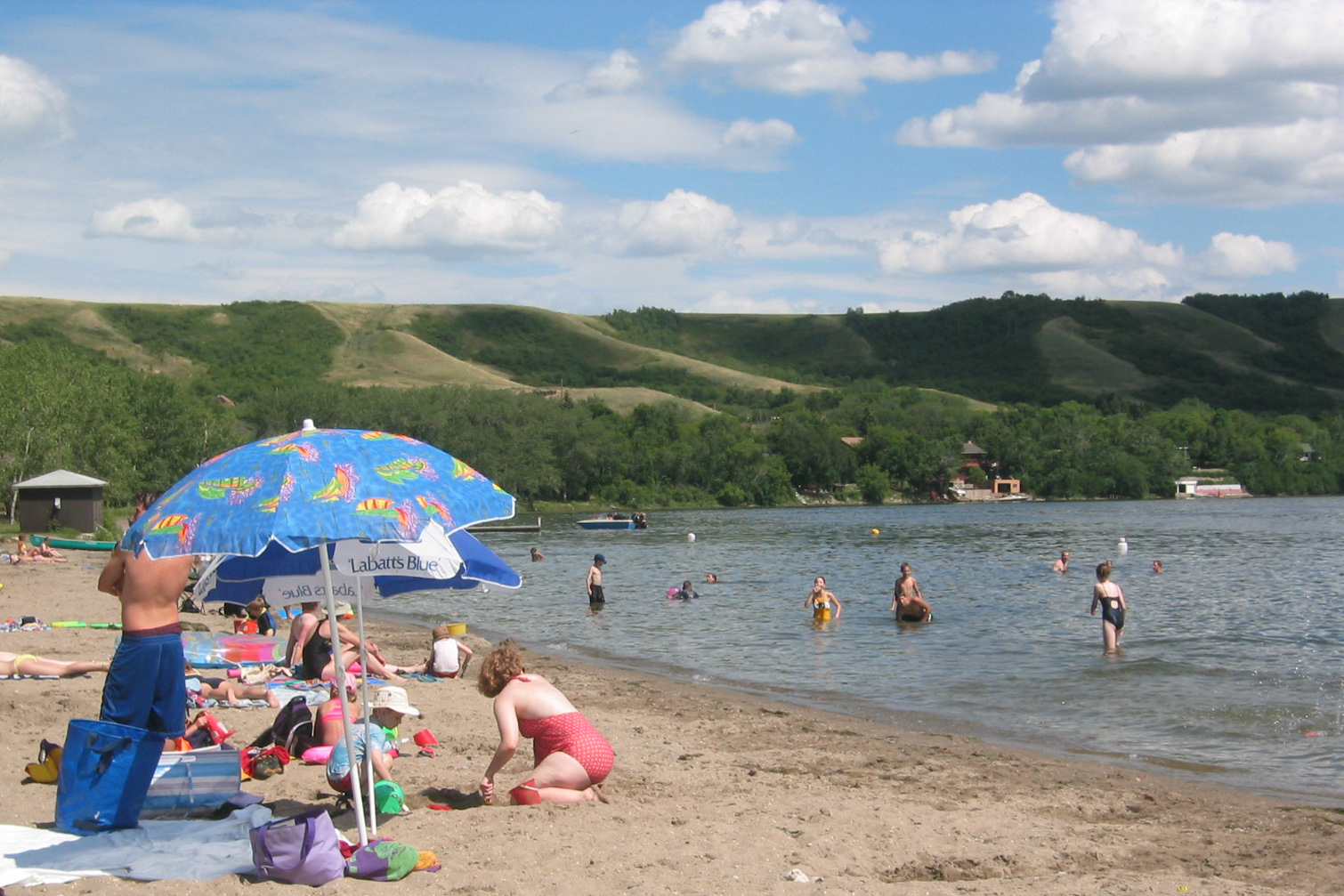
- Katepwa Beach

- Location within Saskatchewan Location within Canada
- Coordinates: 50.7°N 103.634°W
- Country: Canada
- Province: Saskatchewan
- Census division: 6
- Rural municipality: Abernethy No. 186
- Incorporated: July 24, 2004

Government
  - Mayor: Don Jewitt
  - Governing body: Resort Village Council
  - Administrator: Gail E. Sloan

Area (2016)
  - Land: 5.78 km^{2} (2.23 sq mi)

Population (2016)
  - Total: 312
  - Density: 54/km^{2} (140/sq mi)
- Time zone: CST
  - Summer (DST): CST
- Area codes: 306 and 639
- Highway(s): Highway 56 / Highway 619
- Waterway(s): Katepwa Lake

Katepwa (2016 population: 312) is a resort village in the Canadian province of Saskatchewan within Census Division No. 6. It is on the eastern and southern shores of Katepwa Lake in the Rural Municipality of Abernethy No. 186. The name Katepwa likely comes from the Cree word Kahtapwao meaning "What is calling?" The name was given to the last in the chain of four lakes, Katepwa Lake. Legend has it that spirits inhabited the shores of the lake and First Nation people would hear voices on the lake.

The Resort Village of the District of Katepwa was incorporated on July 24, 2004. Its incorporation was the result of the amalgamation of three separate resort villages – Katepwa Beach, Katepwa South and Sandy Beach. Katepwa Beach and Katepwa South originally incorporated as a resort villages on August 1, 1957 and January 1, 1990 respectively.

== History ==
The Qu'Appelle Valley was formed approximately 14,000 years ago as retreating glaciers and their meltwater sculpted the landscape. The valley was further changed by erosion and sediment. This sediment is also responsible for forming what was once one long lake into the four Fishing Lakes of Pasqua Lake, Echo Lake, Mission Lake, and Katepwa Lake. First Nations could have been living in this area as early as eleven thousand years ago, after the glacier retreated.

When white settlers reached the area, Assiniboine and Cree were the two most prominent groups living there. Predating the settlers were missions established by Presbyterians, Anglicans, and Methodists. In 1864, Fort Qu'Appelle was established as a Hudson Bay Trading Post, and the following year, Bishop Tache, the Bishop of St. Boniface opened a mission at St. Florent, (present day Lebret). Following the first Riel rebellion in Manitoba in 1870, Métis were forced to leave the new province and moved into the valley. The first settlers, among them John Louder, began farming in the area soon after. Churches and schools were well established by 1890.

=== Settlement ===
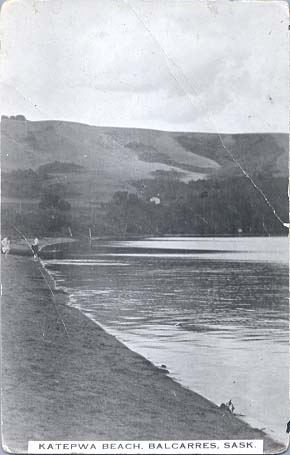
Katepwa Point in 1900

In 1898, Arthur Osment moved his brick factory from Indian Head to Lebret, but it was not successful, and sold to Clem Peltier who moved it to the end of the lake. The factory was closed by 1908 due to competition.

Soon, activities began happening on the lake, such as picnics, boating, and fishing. A summer resort was soon added to the lake. Skating became a popular winter pastime, as well as ice fishing. A type of net called a jigger which would be placed through a hole in the ice and checked for fish every two days or so. Some commercial fishing took place on Katepwa Lake in the early 1970s.

=== Katepwa Beach Syndicate ===
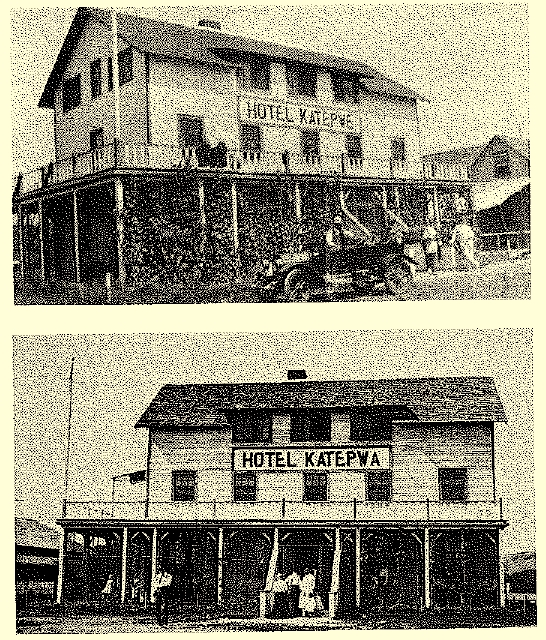
Two Photographs of the Katepwa Hotel, one with the original spelling of "Katepwe" and the other spelt "Katepwa"

By 1914, the Katepwa Beach Syndicate was formed, subdividing the land where the village of Katepwa now stands The syndicate set up laws concerning the sale of property and sanitation in the townsite. Another subdivision, Who Calls Beach, was surveyed in 1911, followed by Lake View Beach in 1913, Idylwyld in 1919, and Como Park in 1921 (incorporated with Sandy Beach in 1980). Dundurn Park predates the syndicate and the other subdivisions.

Soon after the syndicate was formed, the summer resort grew to include the hotel, dining room, tea room that also served as a sort of general store, a dance hall, a boat rental, and an 18-hole golf course. The hotel was operated by the Grant family until 1934. In 1940, Jack Obleman and Wally Wirth took over the Katepwa Hotel when the previous owner, Mr. Arlet, died after running the Hotel for a year. Mr. Obleman ran the hotel while Mr. Wirth went overseas in World War II, and Mr. Wirth and his wife, Lillian, ran the Hotel until 1955, at which point they sold it to Allan Robinson from Indian Head. The hotel burned down in May 1977 and was quickly rebuilt, opening July 1 that same year.

In 1912, Adelaide Hemstreet opened the Sunset Inn Tea Room. In 1913 she built a number of simply furnished cabins which she rented to guests. She expanded the land in 1914 and built a kitchen and screened-in veranda. Guests were fed in the tea room, which became exclusive and gave the Inn a very good reputation. Al Chaffee bought the Sunset Inn in 1939 and added a confectionery store and improved the kitchen. He added electric lights to the cabins, the store, the inn, and the dining room, as well as a telephone.

The business was sold in 1946 to W.J. (Bill) Oliver, who expanded the store considerably, increased the number of cabins, modernised the cabins, including electric refrigerators and flush toilets. His wife, Mae, ran the dining room, which offered formal Sunday turkey dinners, and his son, Dwight, helped out as well. Bert Miles bought the store from Bill in 1962, but sold it to Dwight Oliver in 1968. Jay and Bonnie Haaland ran the store from 1970 to 1973, followed by Pete and Frankie Law from 1974 to 1976. Dwight Oliver's children, Bryan and Barbie, ran the business in 1977. The Laws bought the store in 1978 and continued to run the business until 1982, when it was sold to Maureen Barth.

Bill Oliver continued to care for the cabins until the last of them was sold in 1978, leaving only the store. After several more changes in ownership, the store was torn down in April 2010.

== Geography ==
The Resort Village of Katepwa is located approximately 95 km north-east of Regina via the Trans-Canada Highway and 120 km south-west of Yorkton. The south-facing beach is protected from winds and algae blooms.

== Demographics ==
Population history (2001–2016)
Year	Pop.	±%
2001	316	—
2006	285	−9.8%
2011	403	+41.4%
2016	312	−22.6%
Source: Statistics Canada via Saskatchewan Bureau of Statistics

In the 2021 Census of Population conducted by Statistics Canada, Katepwa had a population of 539 living in 270 of its 761 total private dwellings, a change of 72.8% from its 2016 population of 312. With a land area of 4.49 km^{2} (1.73 sq mi), it had a population density of 120.0/km^{2} (310.9/sq mi) in 2021.

In the 2016 Census of Population conducted by Statistics Canada, the Resort Village of the District of Katepwa recorded a population of 312 living in 159 of its 808 total private dwellings, a −22.6% change from its 2011 population of 403. With a land area of 5.78 km^{2} (2.23 sq mi), it had a population density of 54.0/km^{2} (139.8/sq mi) in 2016.

== Attractions ==
Located in the Qu’Appelle Valley, the resort village is home to a hotel and restaurant, cottages and log cabins to rent, and a general store just off the beach, complete with confections, ice cream, and gas and propane. The adjacent beach and provincial park at Katepwa Point feature a playground and a boat launch. The provincial park was formerly Vidal Point Dominion Park from 1921 to 1930.

=== The beach ===
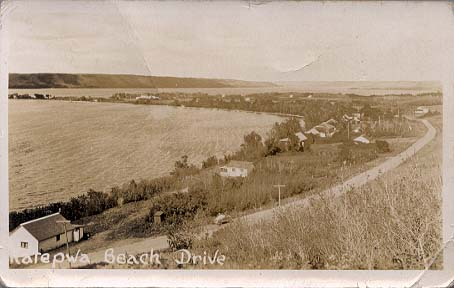
Katepwa Beach from Katepwa Drive circa 1931

Katepwa Point Provincial Park is a day-use park. The beach area features swimming, restrooms, change rooms, picnicking, a playground, and barbecues. The picnic area is set in a large grassy area just behind the beach with mature trees and the playground. There is also a boat launch east of the beach that has one dock with two launching pads. Activities on the lake include fishing, water-skiing, wakeboarding, tubing, sailing, and windsurfing. Mini-golf is also available, as well as flea markets on Sundays.

=== Fishing ===
Fishing is a year-round activity on Katepwa Lake. Perch, walleye, and northern pike are all common fish to be caught in both the summer and winter. In the summer, fishing is done off the western point, next to the beach, and from boats. In the winter, ice fishing is very popular.

=== Golfing ===
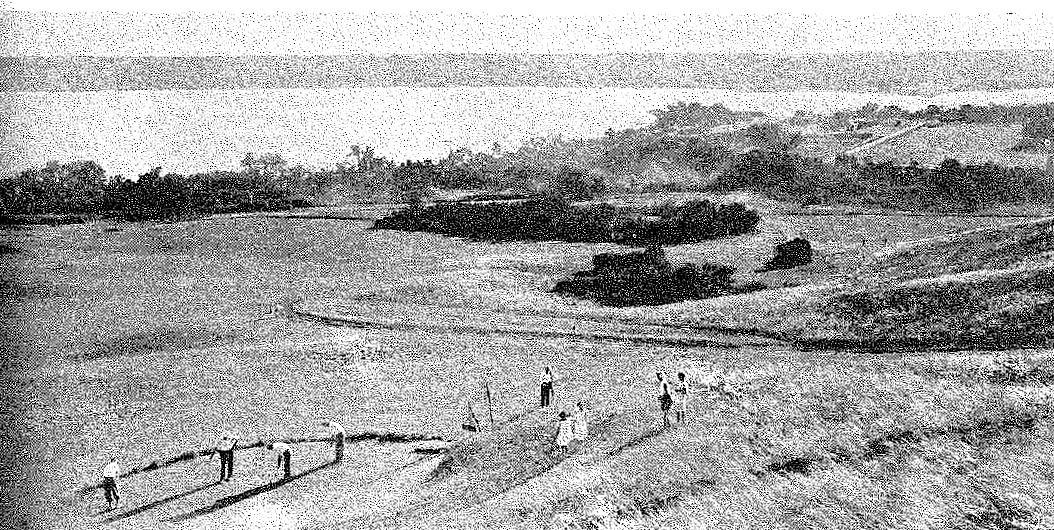
Original Golf Course at Katepwa

The Katepwa Beach Golf Course is a golf course with its roots in the Syndicate formed in the early 1900s. Early residents carved the first 18-hole course out of the hills shortly after establishing cottages on the lake. In the 1980s, use of the golf course had dropped so low that it was put up for sale. A group of golfers bought the land and reserved it for a golf course. In the mid-nineties, a new 9-hole course was built, which has gained international renown. The course is unique in that there is no fee to maintain membership; members need only pay for the rounds of golf they play. A simpler 9-hole, family-friendly course called Katepwa Family Nine Golf Course is also located in the area.

=== Trails ===
The Katepwa Nature Trail starts in the park and winds through the nearby coulees, with signs along the way explaining flora and fauna that can be found in the area. The historic Fort Ellice-Fort Qu'Appelle Trail begins at the end of Lake Katepwa and is a day-long driving trip through to Crooked Lake. Bird-watching in Skinners Marsh and a visit to the Fort Ellice Historical Site are possible activities along the way.

=== Churches ===
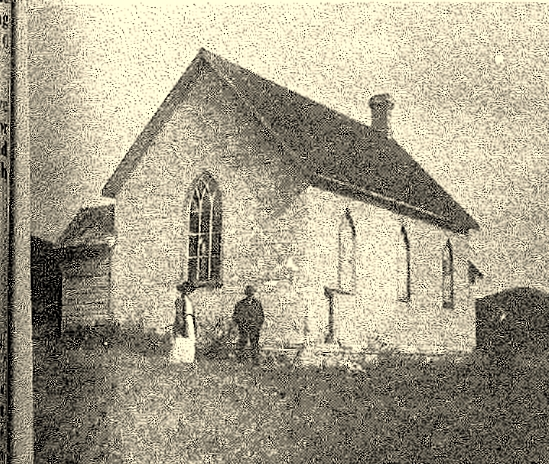
The All Saints' Anglican Church c. 1900

The All Saints’ Anglican Church Katepwe was built in 1886 on the south-eastern shore of the lake, in a small settlement then known as Lauder's Town. John Lauder, the owner of the townsite, donated the land. Construction started in July 1886 with the hauling of stones from nearby fields, to be used for the foundation. The main structure is wood and concrete. The church was not fully completed until after its consecration on August 21, 1887. Although the church was not completed until 1887, the members of its congregation held Anglican services in local homes and the schoolhouse as early as 1884, and this is considered the year of origin for All Saints’ Anglican Church Katepwe. The graveyard beside the church is the final resting place of many original settlers. Regular services ceased in 1945 and the church was only used in July and August. By the 1960s, the building was in poor condition and leaning from the pressure of the chimney. The exterior was repaired, followed by a complete refurbishment of the interior by the end of the 1970s. Electricity was installed in 1982. Congregation members throughout the years have made maintenance of the church and churchyard possible by various donations and bequests.

Roman Catholic churches in the area have always centred on Lebret. Catholic interment continues there today.

== Government ==
The Resort Village of the District of Katepwa is governed by an elected municipal council and an appointed administrator that meets on the third Tuesday of every month. The mayor is Don Jewitt and its administrator is Gail E. Sloan. It holds elections once every four years. Anyone who is an eligible voter in his or her municipality can run for a position on council. Eligible voters are those who are over eighteen years of age, reside in Katepwa, and own assessable land in the municipality. Council is responsible for monitoring public funds, appointing the administration, and acting as the internal control for proper use of the public funds. The administration does most of the financial work along with the council within the municipality.

== See also ==
- List of communities in Saskatchewan
- List of resort villages in Saskatchewan
- List of villages in Saskatchewan
- List of summer villages in Alberta
- List of place names in Canada of Indigenous origin
