= Sandy Beach, Saskatchewan =

Former resort village in Saskatchewan, Canada

Sandy Beach
- Former resort village
- Location within Saskatchewan
- Coordinates: 50.727°N 103.649°W
- Country: Canada
- Province: Saskatchewan
- Census division: 6
- Rural municipality: RM of Abernethy No. 186
- Resort village: District of Katepwa
- Incorporated (resort village): 1954
- Amalgamated: July 24, 2004

Government
  - Mayor: Don Jewitt
  - Governing body: Resort Village Council
  - Administrator: Gail E. Sloan
  - Councillors: Darren Cyca; Murdoch MacPherson

Area (2006)
  - Land: 0.14 km^{2} (0.054 sq mi)

Population (2006)
  - Total: 48
  - Density: 342.9/km^{2} (888/sq mi)
- Time zone: CST
  - Summer (DST): CST
- Area codes: 306 and 639
- Highway(s): Highway 56
- Waterway(s): Katepwa Lake

Sandy Beach (2006 population: 48) is a former resort village in the Canadian province of Saskatchewan within Census Division No. 6. It is now part of the District of Katepwa. Sandy Beach is on the eastern shore of Katepwa Lake in the Rural Municipality of Abernethy No. 186, approximately 13 km (8.1 mi) south-east of the town of Fort Qu'Appelle on Highway 56.

== History ==
Sandy Beach originally incorporated as a resort village in 1954. It, and the resort villages of Katepwa Beach and Katepwa South, amalgamated on July 24, 2004 to form the Resort Village of the District of Katepwa.

== Demographics ==
Population history (1961–2006)
Year	Pop.	±%
1961	13	—
1966	11	−15.4%
1971	5	−54.5%
1986	12	+140.0%
1991	49	+308.3%
1996	88	+79.6%
2001	83	−5.7%
2006	48	−42.2%
Source: Statistics Canada

In the 2006 Census of Population conducted by Statistics Canada, the former Resort Village of Sandy Beach recorded a population of 48 living in 24 of its 159 total private dwellings, a −42.2% change from its 2001 population of 83. With a land area of 0.14 km^{2} (0.054 sq mi), it had a population density of 342.9/km^{2} (888.0/sq mi) in 2006.

In the 2001 Census of Population, the Resort Village of Sandy Beach recorded a population of 83, a −5.7% change from its 1996 population of 88. With a land area of 0.35 km^{2} (0.14 sq mi), it had a population density of 251.4/km^{2} (651.2/sq mi) in 2001.

== Government ==
The former Resort Village of Sandy Beach has been governed by the District of Katepwa since the 2004 amalgamation. Sandy Beach is in Ward 1, which is represented by councillors Darren Cyca and Murdoch MacPherson. The District of Katepwa's mayor is Rick Pattison and its administrator is Gail E. Sloan.

== See also ==
- List of communities in Saskatchewan
- List of municipalities in Saskatchewan
- List of resort villages in Saskatchewan
