= Katepwa South =

Former resort village in Saskatchewan, Canada

- Former resort village
- Location within Saskatchewan
- Coordinates: 50.667°N 103.634°W
- Country: Canada
- Province: Saskatchewan
- Census division: 6
- Rural municipality: RM of Abernethy No. 186
- Resort village: District of Katepwa
- Incorporated (resort village): January 1, 1990
- Amalgamated: July 24, 2004

Government
  - Mayor: Don Jewitt
  - Governing body: Resort Village Council
  - Administrator: Gail E. Sloan
  - Councillor: David Thauberger

Area (2006)
  - Land: 3.31 km^{2} (1.28 sq mi)

Population (2006)
  - Total: 125
  - Density: 37.8/km^{2} (98/sq mi)
- Time zone: CST
  - Summer (DST): CST
- Area codes: 306 and 639
- Highway(s): Highway 56 / Highway 619
- Waterway(s): Katepwa Lake

Katepwa South (2006 population: 125) is a former resort village in the Canadian province of Saskatchewan within Census Division No. 6. It is now part of the District of Katepwa. Katepwa South is on the southwest shore of Katepwa Lake in the Rural Municipality of Abernethy No. 186, approximately 23 km (14 mi) southeast of the Town of Fort Qu'Appelle on Highway 56.

== History ==
Katepwa South incorporated as a resort village on January 1, 1990. It, and the resort villages of Katepwa Beach and Sandy Beach, amalgamated on July 24, 2004 to form the Resort Village of the District of Katepwa.

== Demographics ==
Population history (1991–2006)
Year	Pop.	±%
1991	32	—
1996	30	−6.2%
2001	44	+46.7%
2006	125	+184.1%
Source: Statistics Canada

In the 2006 Census of Population conducted by Statistics Canada, the former Resort Village of Katepwa South recorded a population of 125 living in 63 of its 428 total private dwellings, a 184.1% change from its 2001 population of 44. With a land area of 3.31 km^{2} (1.28 sq mi), it had a population density of 37.8/km^{2} (97.8/sq mi) in 2006.

In the 2001 Census of Population, the Resort Village of Katepwa South recorded a population of 44, a 46.7% change from its 1996 population of 30. With a land area of 1.87 km^{2} (0.72 sq mi), it had a population density of 16.0/km^{2} (41.6/sq mi) in 2001.

== Government ==
The former Resort Village of Katepwa South has been governed by the District of Katepwa since the 2004 amalgamation. Katepwa South is in Ward 3, which is represented by Councillor David Thauberger and Corey Hodson. The District of Katepwa's mayor is Rick Pattison and its administrator is Gail E. Sloan.

== See also ==
- List of communities in Saskatchewan
- List of municipalities in Saskatchewan
- List of resort villages in Saskatchewan
