= Rural Municipality of Indian Head No. 156 =

Rural municipality in Saskatchewan, Canada

Indian Head No. 156
- Rural municipality
- Rural Municipality of Indian Head No. 156
- Location of the RM of Indian Head No. 156 in Saskatchewan
- Coordinates: 50.596°N 103.561°W
- Country: Canada
- Province: Saskatchewan
- Census division: 6
- SARM division: 1
- Formed: August 6, 1884

Government
  - Reeve: Terry Rein
  - Governing body: RM of Indian Head No. 156 Council
  - Administrator: Tracy Luscombe
  - Office location: Indian Head

Area (2016)
  - Land: 759.98 km^{2} (293.43 sq mi)

Population (2016)
  - Total: 336
  - Density: 0.4/km^{2} (1.0/sq mi)
- Time zone: CST
  - Summer (DST): CST
- Area codes: 306 and 639

The Rural Municipality of Indian Head No. 156 (2016 population: 336) is a rural municipality (RM) in the Canadian province of Saskatchewan within Census Division No. 6 and SARM Division No. 1. It is located in the southeast portion of the province.

== History ==
The RM of Indian Head No. 156 incorporated as a rural municipality on August 6, 1884. The first settlers moved into the district in 1882.

== Geography ==
=== Communities and localities ===
The following urban municipalities are surrounded by the RM.

Towns

- Indian Head
- Sintaluta

Resort villages

- Katepwa (part)

== Demographics ==
Population history (1981–2016)
Year	Pop.	±%
1981	579	—
1986	577	−0.3%
1991	486	−15.8%
1996	449	−7.6%
2001	398	−11.4%
2006	356	−10.6%
2011	380	+6.7%
2016	336	−11.6%
Source: Statistics Canada via Saskatchewan Bureau of Statistics

In the 2021 Census of Population conducted by Statistics Canada, the RM of Indian Head No. 156 had a population of 362 living in 145 of its 153 total private dwellings, a change of 7.7% from its 2016 population of 336. With a land area of 745.38 km^{2} (287.79 sq mi), it had a population density of 0.5/km^{2} (1.3/sq mi) in 2021.

In the 2016 Census of Population, the RM of Indian Head No. 156 recorded a population of 336 living in 136 of its 166 total private dwellings, a −11.6% change from its 2011 population of 380. With a land area of 759.98 km^{2} (293.43 sq mi), it had a population density of 0.4/km^{2} (1.1/sq mi) in 2016.

== Government ==
The RM of Indian Head No. 156 is governed by an elected municipal council and an appointed administrator that meets on the second Tuesday of every month. The reeve of the RM is James Woidyla while its administrator is Tracy Luscombe. The RM's office is located in Indian Head.
