= Jeff Lank =

Canadian ice hockey player

- Born: March 1, 1975 (age 50) Indian Head, Saskatchewan, Canada
- Height: 6 ft 3 in (191 cm)
- Weight: 210 lb (95 kg; 15 st 0 lb)
- Position: Defence
- Shot: Left
- Played for: Philadelphia Flyers
- NHL draft: 113th overall, 1993; Montreal Canadiens; 230th overall, 1995; Philadelphia Flyers
- Playing career: 1995–2000

Jeff Lank (born March 1, 1975) is a Canadian former professional ice hockey player. He played two NHL games with the Philadelphia Flyers during the 1999–2000 season.

Lank was born in Indian Head, Saskatchewan.

== Career statistics ==
			Regular season					Playoffs
Season	Team	League	GP	G	A	Pts	PIM	GP	G	A	Pts	PIM
1990–91	Columbia Valley Rockies	KIJHL	54	6	28	34	33	—	—	—	—	—
1991–92	Prince Albert Raiders	WHL	56	2	8	10	26	9	0	0	0	2
1992–93	Prince Albert Raiders	WHL	63	1	11	12	60	—	—	—	—	—
1993–94	Prince Albert Raiders	WHL	72	9	38	47	62	—	—	—	—	—
1994–95	Prince Albert Raiders	WHL	68	12	25	37	60	13	2	10	12	8
1995–96	Hershey Bears	AHL	72	7	13	20	70	5	0	0	0	8
1996–97	Philadelphia Phantoms	AHL	44	2	12	14	49	7	2	1	3	4
1997–98	Philadelphia Phantoms	AHL	69	7	9	16	59	20	1	4	5	22
1998–99	Philadelphia Phantoms	AHL	51	5	10	15	36	2	0	0	0	2
1999–00	Philadelphia Flyers	NHL	2	0	0	0	2	—	—	—	—	—
1999–00	Philadelphia Phantoms	AHL	26	1	4	5	16	3	0	0	0	2
AHL totals			262	22	48	70	230	37	3	5	8	38
NHL totals			2	0	0	0	2	—	—	—	—	—
