= Katepwa Lake =

Lake in Saskatchewan, Canada

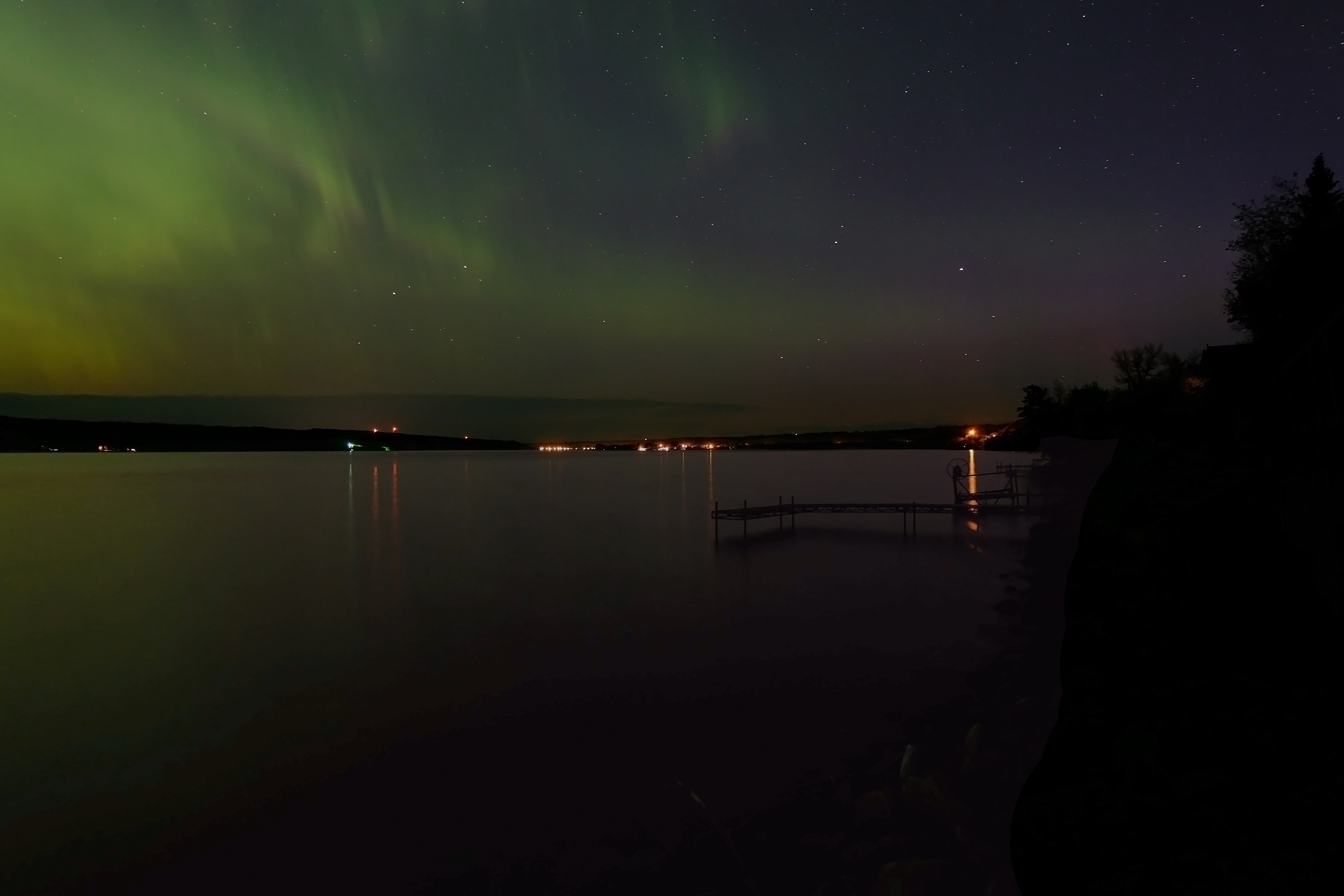
- Aurora over Katepwa Lake

- Location in Saskatchewan Katepwa Lake (Canada)
- Location: District of Katepwa, Saskatchewan
- Group: Fishing Lakes
- Coordinates: 50°41′N 103°37′W
- Part of: Red River drainage basin
- Primary inflows: Qu'Appelle River
- Primary outflows: Qu'Appelle River
- Basin countries: Canada
- Max. length: 9.9 km (6.2 mi)
- Max. width: 1.7 km (1.1 mi)
- Surface area: 1,651 ha (4,080 acres)
- Average depth: 14.3 m (47 ft)
- Max. depth: 23.2 m (76 ft)
- Water volume: 229,431 dam^{3} (186,003 acre⋅ft)
- Shore length^{1}: 25.7 km (16.0 mi)
- Surface elevation: 458 m (1,503 ft)
- Settlements: Katepwa
- ^{1} Shore length is not a well-defined measure.

Katepwa Lake (/kəˈtɛpwə/) is a recreational lake in the Qu'appelle Valley in the Canadian province of Saskatchewan. The lake's name likely originated from the Cree word Kahtapwao, which means "What is calling?" Katepwa Lake is the eastern most and farthest downstream of four lakes along the Qu'Appelle River known as the Fishing Lakes. Highway 56 runs along the eastern and southern shore and Highway 619 runs along the south-eastern shore.

Katepwa Lake, as well as the other three Fishing Lakes, are all in the Qu'Appelle Valley, which was formed about 14,000 years ago during the last ice age. Meltwater from the glaciers carved out the valley and, as water levels rose and fell, alluvium was left in the wake. These piles of alluvium are what created the separations between the lakes.

== Communities ==
Two rural municipalities border the lake. On the north and east side is the RM of Abernethy No. 186 and on the west is the RM of North Qu'Appelle No. 187. The Resort Village of the District of Katepwa occupies much of the eastern and southern shoreline. It was formed in 2004 with the amalgamation of three resort villages, Katepwa South, Katepwa Beach, and Sandy Beach.

On the west side of the lake, there are the communities of Taylor Beach, Lake View Beach, and Carry the Kettle Indian reserve.

== Parks and recreation ==
Katepwa Point Provincial Park is located at Katepwa Beach on the eastern side of the lake. It is a day-use park that has swimming, fishing, boating, and picnicking.

On the western shore, there are two Christian summer camps — Camp Monahan and Katepwa Lake Camp.

Also along the lake, there are walking paths, nature trails, and two golf courses near Katepwa Beach.

A section of the Trans Canada Trail runs along the eastern shore of Katepwa Lake. The trail is part of the historic Fort Ellice–Fort Qu'Appelle Trail that was used from the 1830s to bring furs from the west, east to Fort Garry. From the 1850s, explorers and settlers heading west also used this trail. The trail was part of a wide network of trails that ran across the Canadian Prairies. Several famous explorers used this trail, including John Palliser, James Hector, Henry Youle Hind, and James Carnegie, 9th Earl of Southesk. With the coming of the Canadian Pacific Railway's Transcontinental railway in 1882, the trail lost its importance and faded away as a route to the west. Part of the trail has been turned into a gravel road and some of it remains hikeable.

== Katepwa Dam ==
Katepwa Dam (50.6627°N 103.6029°W) is at the eastern end of the lake where the Qu'Appelle River flows out. The dam is 5 metres (16 ft) high and impounds a reservoir with a capacity of 229,431 dam^{3} (186,003 acre⋅ft). It was originally built in 1957 and then upgraded in 2005.

== See also ==
- Saskatchewan Water Security Agency
- List of dams and reservoirs in Canada
- List of lakes of Saskatchewan
- Tourism in Saskatchewan
