= Katepwa Beach =

Community in Saskatchewan, Canada

- Former resort village
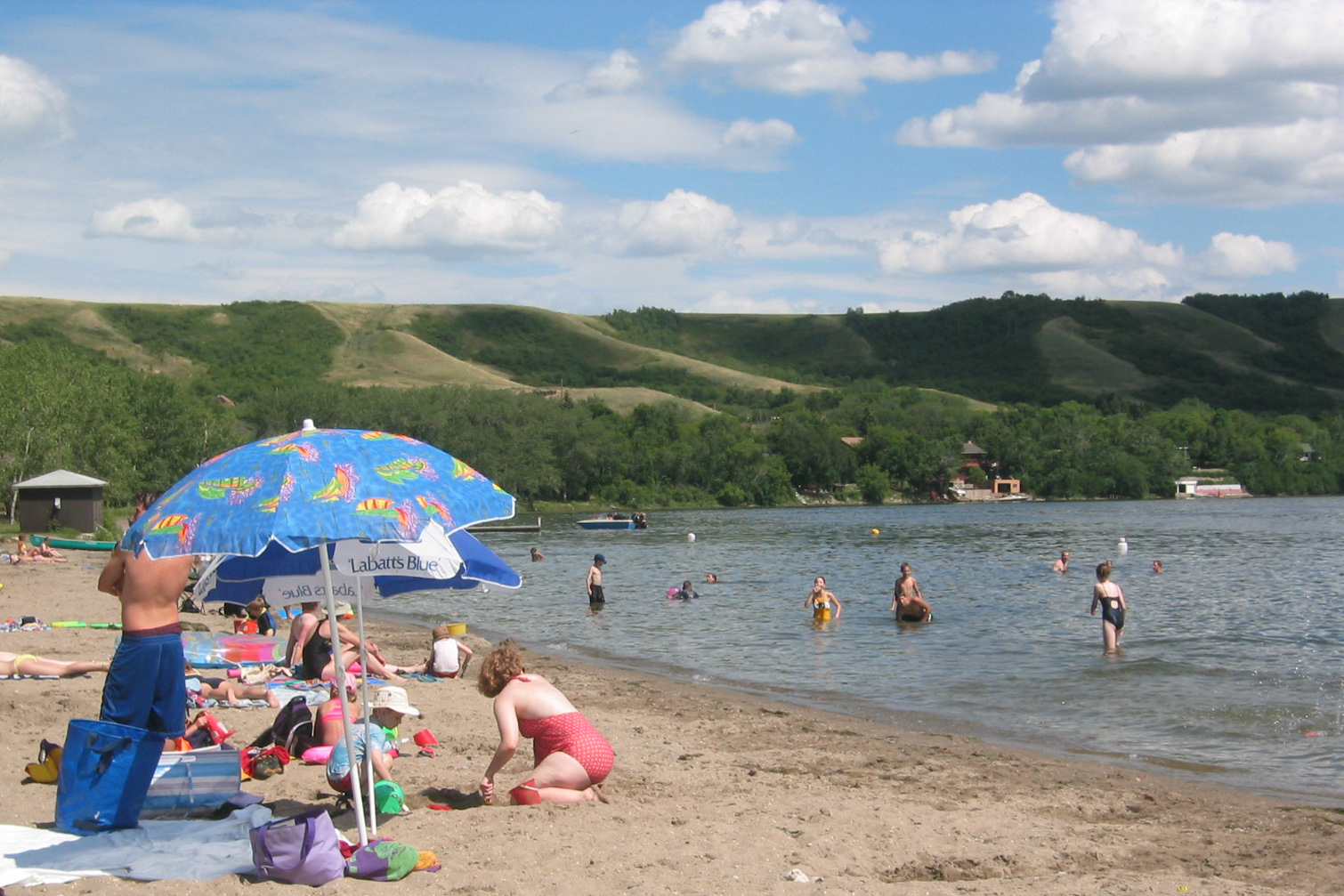
- Katepwa Beach

- Location within Saskatchewan
- Coordinates: 50.697°N 103.628°W
- Country: Canada
- Province: Saskatchewan
- Census division: 6
- Rural municipality: RM of Abernethy No. 186
- Resort village: District of Katepwa
- Incorporated (resort village): August 1, 1957
- Name change: May 13, 1992
- Amalgamated: July 24, 2004

Government
  - Mayor: Don Jewitt
  - Governing body: Resort Village Council
  - Administrator: Gail E. Sloan
  - Councillors: Michael Alport; Georden Pettigrew; Dennis Temple

Area (2006)
  - Land: 1.69 km^{2} (0.65 sq mi)

Population (2006)
  - Total: 112
  - Density: 66.3/km^{2} (172/sq mi)
- Time zone: CST
  - Summer (DST): CST
- Area codes: 306 and 639
- Highway(s): Highway 56 / Highway 619
- Waterway(s): Katepwa Lake

Katepwa Beach (2006 population: 112) is a former resort village in the Canadian province of Saskatchewan within Census Division No. 6. It is now part of the District of Katepwa. Katepwa Beach is on the eastern shore of Katepwa Lake in the RM of Abernethy No. 186, approximately 16 kilometres (9.9 mi) south-east of the town of Fort Qu'Appelle on Highway 56.

Located on the south side of Katepwa Beach is Katepwa Point Provincial Park and on the east side are two golf courses. Katepwa Beach Golf Course is an 18-hole course and Katepwa Family Nine Golf Course is a 9-hole course.

== History ==
Katepwa Beach incorporated as a resort village on August 1, 1957, under the official name of the Summer Resort Village of Katepwa Beach. The resort village changed its official name to the Resort Village of Katepwa Beach on May 13, 1992. It, and the resort villages of Katepwa South and Sandy Beach, amalgamated on July 24, 2004, to form the Resort Village of the District of Katepwa.

== Demographics ==
Population history (1961–2006)
Year	Pop.	±%
1961	31	—
1966	19	−38.7%
1971	44	+131.6%
1976	34	−22.7%
1981	45	+32.4%
1986	90	+100.0%
1991	148	+64.4%
1996	103	−30.4%
2001	189	+83.5%
2006	112	−40.7%
Source: Statistics Canada

In the 2006 Census of Population conducted by Statistics Canada, the former Resort Village of Katepwa Beach recorded a population of 112 living in 56 of its 279 total private dwellings, a −40.7% change from its 2001 population of 189. With a land area of 1.69 km^{2} (0.65 sq mi), it had a population density of 66.3/km^{2} (171.6/sq mi) in 2006.

In the 2001 Census of Population, the Resort Village of Katepwa Beach recorded a population of 189, an 83.5% change from its 1996 population of 103. With a land area of 2.89 km^{2} (1.12 sq mi), it had a population density of 65.4/km^{2} (169.4/sq mi) in 2001.

== Government ==
The former Resort Village of Katepwa Beach has been governed by the District of Katepwa since the 2004 amalgamation. Katepwa Beach is in Ward 2, which is represented by councillors Stephen Alport, Scott Baber and Garry Huntington, . The District of Katepwa's mayor is Rick Pattison and its administrator is Gail E. Sloan.

== See also ==
- List of communities in Saskatchewan
- List of municipalities in Saskatchewan
- List of resort villages in Saskatchewan
