= Katepwa Point Provincial Park =

Provincial park in Saskatchewan, Canada

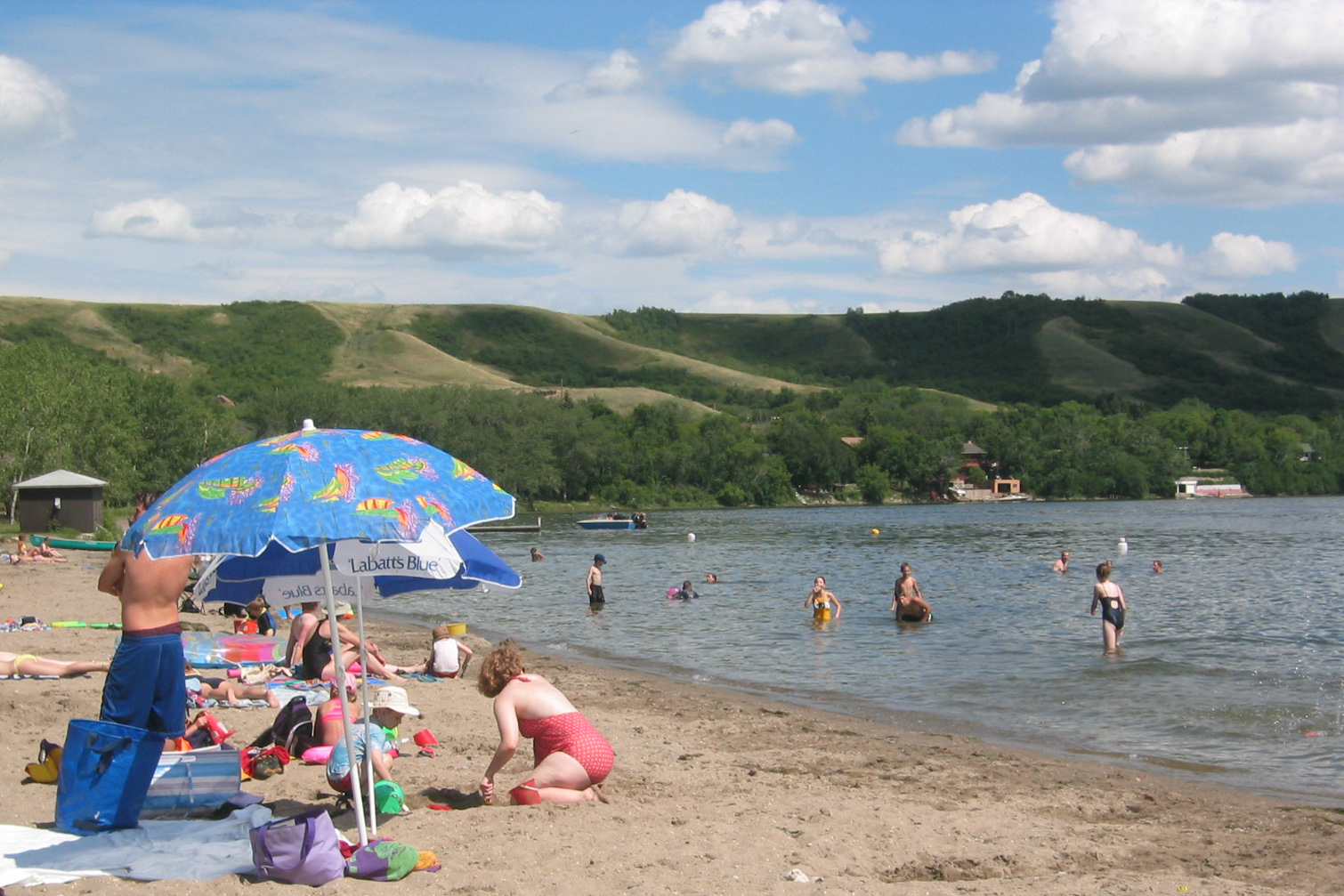
- Katepwa Beach

- Location within Saskatchewan Location within Canada
- Location: Saskatchewan
- Nearest city: Fort Qu'Appelle, Indian Head
- Coordinates: 50°41′39″N 103°37′38″W
- Area: 5 ha (12 acres)
- Established: 1931
- Governing body: Sask Parks

Katepwa Point Provincial Park is located along the eastern shore of Katepwa Lake in the southern portion of the Canadian province of Saskatchewan, adjacent to the resort village of Katepwa. The park's primary feature is a large beach, which is complemented by a large lawn, boat launch, and picnic facilities. At only (5 ha (12 acres)) in size, it is among the smallest of Saskatchewan's provincial parks.

The park was established by the Canadian federal government in 1921 as Vidal Point Dominion Park. In 1930, the Government of Canada transferred the responsibility for Saskatchewan's natural resources to the province. As such, Vidal Point fell under the jurisdiction of the newly created Saskatchewan Parks Branch in 1931 and was renamed Katepwa Point Provincial Park. It was one of the six original provincial parks in Saskatchewan, the others being Moose Mountain, Duck Mountain, Cypress Hills, Good Spirit Lake Provincial Park, and Little Manitou.

Highway 56 provides access to the park as it travels along the Qu'Appelle Valley and the Fishing Lakes.

== Attractions ==
The main attraction for the park is the beach. The beach is located in the southern shore of Katepwa Point, on the south side of Katepwa Beach. Besides the beach, there's a picnic area, playground, and a boat launch. Activities at the park include swimming, fishing, boating, and various other water related activities.

In the winter, there's snowmobiling, cross-country skiing, skating, and ice fishing.

Amenities near the park include a golf course, mini-golf, hotel, cabins, licensed dining, and hiking.

== See also ==
- List of protected areas of Saskatchewan
- Tourism in Saskatchewan
- Fishing Lakes
