= Indian Head, Saskatchewan =

Town in Saskatchewan, Canada

- Town
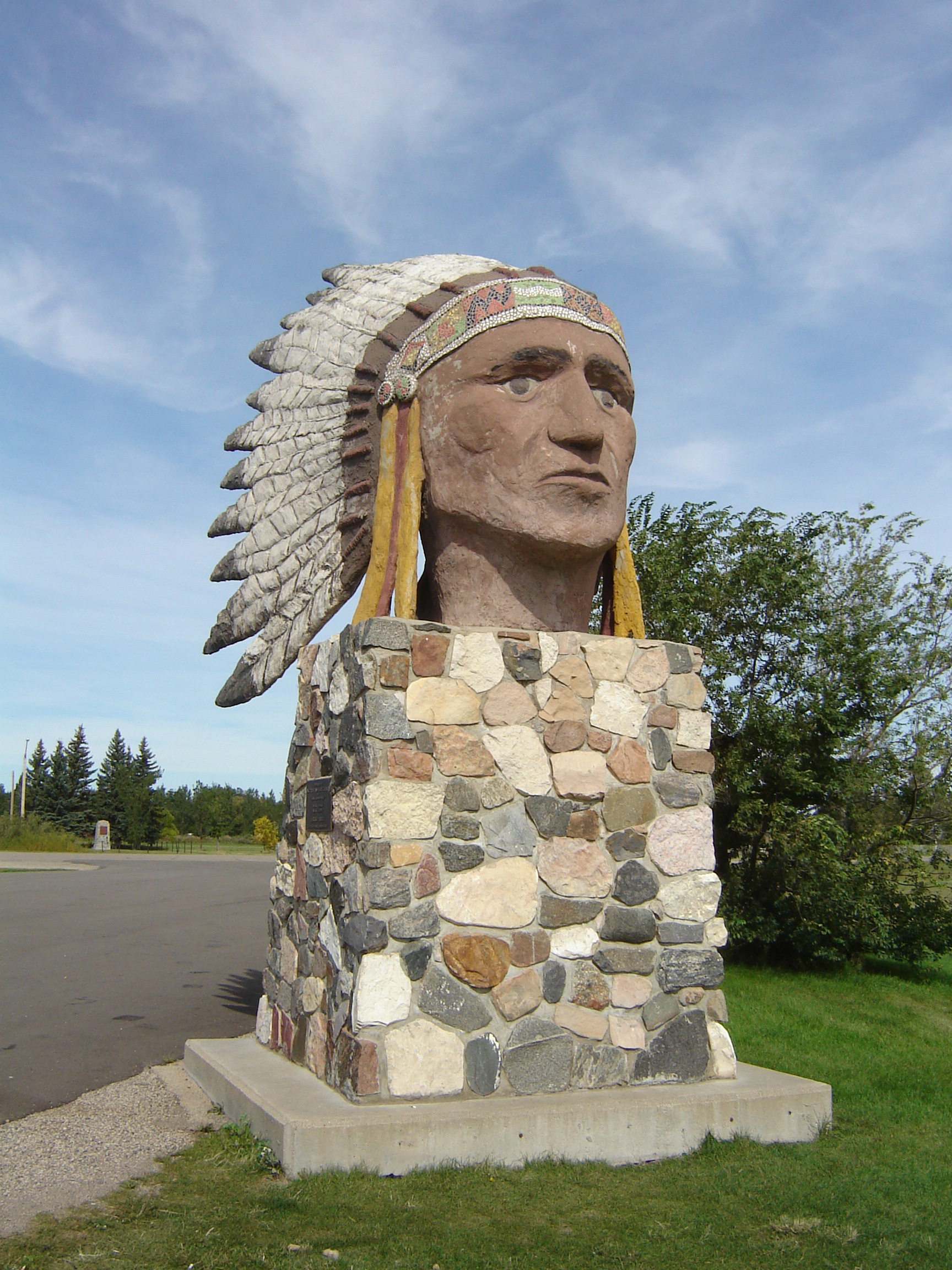
- Indian Head Statue
- Motto: Beautiful Historic Indian Head
- Location within Saskatchewan Location within Canada
- Coordinates: 50.320°N 103.400°W
- Country: Canada
- Province: Saskatchewan
- Census division: 6
- Rural Municipality: Indian Head
- Established: 1882
- Incorporated (Town): 1902

Government
  - Mayor: Steven Cole
  - Governing body: Indian Head Town Council

Area
  - Total: 3.17 km^{2} (1.22 sq mi)

Population (2016)
  - Total: 1,910
  - Density: 602/km^{2} (1,560/sq mi)
- Time zone: CST
- Postal code: S0G 2K0
- Area code: 306
- Highways: Highway 1 (TCH) / Highway 56 / Highway 619
- Website: Town of Indian Head

Indian Head is a town in southeast Saskatchewan, Canada, 69 kilometres (43 mi) east of Regina on the Trans-Canada Highway. It "had its beginnings in 1882 as the first settlers, mainly of Scottish origin, pushed into the area in advance of the railroad, most travelling by ox-cart from Brandon." "Indian" refers to Indigenous peoples in Canada. The town is known for its federally operated experimental farm and tree nursery, which has produced and distributed seedlings for shelter belts since 1901. For many years the program was run by the Prairie Farm Rehabilitation Administration (PFRA).

Indian Head was incorporated as a town in 1902 and the Canadian Journal noted that the community was the largest point of initial shipment of wheat in the world. Today it is run by the Agroforestry Development Centre. Today the town "has a range of professional services and tradespeople, financial institutions, and a large number of retail establishments." The CBC television sitcom Little Mosque on the Prairie was partially filmed here.

== Geography ==
Indian Head is located in the Indian Head Plain of the Aspen Parkland ecoregion on the parkland of the Qu'Appelle flood plain. The area is characterised by lush rolling grasslands, interspersed with poplar bluffs (in prairie Canadian terminology poplar groves surrounding sloughs) and open sloughs. Indian Head is located in the transition zone between the Qu'Appelle River and the corresponding Qu'Appelle Valley and the Canadian Prairies. The Indianhead Creek flows through Indian Head into the Qu'Appelle River to the north. The legal land description is section 24 – township 18 – range 13 – west of the 2nd meridian. About 16 kilometres (10 mi) north of Indian Head are the Fishing Lakes which are part of the Qu'Appelle Valley.

== Climate ==
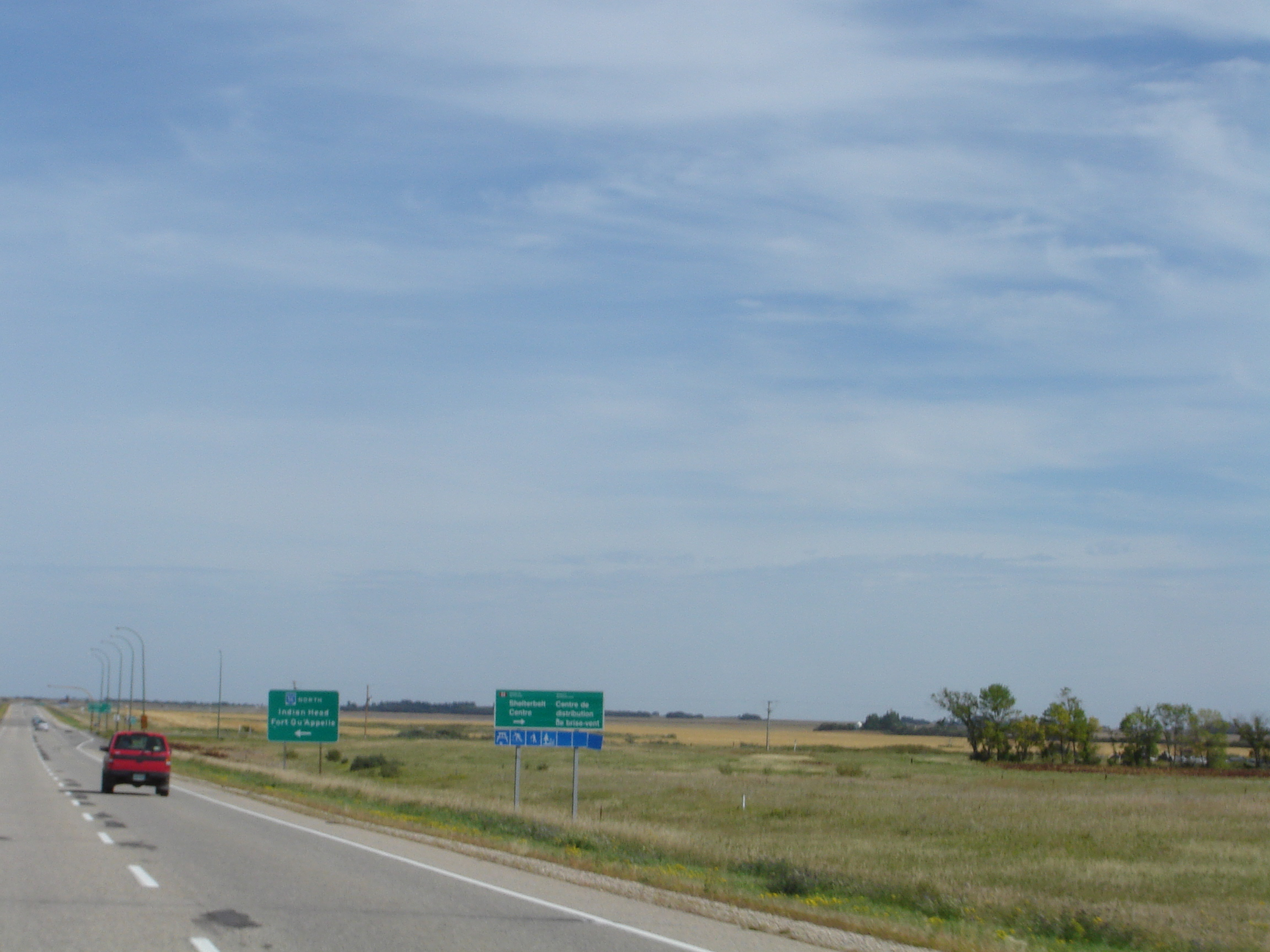
Shelter Belt Centre Saskatchewan Hwy 56 junction on Highway 1, the Trans Canada

Indian Head has a humid continental climate, with extreme seasonal temperatures. It has warm summers and cold winters, with the average daily temperatures ranging from −14.8 °C (5.4 °F) in January to 18.2 °C (64.8 °F) in July. On Average, temperatures exceed 30.0 °C (86 °F) 12 days per year. Typically, summer lasts from late June until late August, and the humidity is seldom uncomfortably high. Winter lasts from November to March and varies greatly in length and severity. Spring and autumn are both short and highly variable.

The highest temperature ever recorded in Indian Head was 42.8 °C (109 °F) on 5 July 1937. The coldest temperature ever recorded was −46.7 °C (−52 °F) on 1 February 1893.

Climate data for Indian Head, 1981–2010 normals, extremes 1885–present
Month	Jan	Feb	Mar	Apr	May	Jun	Jul	Aug	Sep	Oct	Nov	Dec	Year
Record high °C (°F)	9.0 (48.2)	13.9 (57.0)	24.4 (75.9)	33.3 (91.9)	38.0 (100.4)	40.6 (105.1)	42.8 (109.0)	39.4 (102.9)	36.7 (98.1)	31.7 (89.1)	22.8 (73.0)	14.4 (57.9)	42.8 (109.0)
Mean daily maximum °C (°F)	−9.5 (14.9)	−6.7 (19.9)	−0.2 (31.6)	10.9 (51.6)	17.9 (64.2)	22.2 (72.0)	25.0 (77.0)	24.7 (76.5)	18.4 (65.1)	10.3 (50.5)	−0.3 (31.5)	−7.2 (19.0)	8.8 (47.8)
Daily mean °C (°F)	−14.8 (5.4)	−12 (10)	−5.4 (22.3)	4.2 (39.6)	10.8 (51.4)	15.8 (60.4)	18.2 (64.8)	17.4 (63.3)	11.5 (52.7)	4.0 (39.2)	−5.3 (22.5)	−12.4 (9.7)	2.7 (36.9)
Mean daily minimum °C (°F)	−20.1 (−4.2)	−17.3 (0.9)	−10.5 (13.1)	−2.6 (27.3)	3.7 (38.7)	9.3 (48.7)	11.4 (52.5)	10.1 (50.2)	4.5 (40.1)	−2.3 (27.9)	−10.2 (13.6)	−17.5 (0.5)	−3.5 (25.7)
Record low °C (°F)	−45.6 (−50.1)	−46.7 (−52.1)	−44.4 (−47.9)	−30.6 (−23.1)	−15.0 (5.0)	−4.4 (24.1)	−0.6 (30.9)	−2.8 (27.0)	−13.3 (8.1)	−30.0 (−22.0)	−38.9 (−38.0)	−41.5 (−42.7)	−46.7 (−52.1)
Average precipitation mm (inches)	19.2 (0.76)	14.3 (0.56)	24.3 (0.96)	22.6 (0.89)	51.7 (2.04)	77.4 (3.05)	63.8 (2.51)	51.2 (2.02)	35.3 (1.39)	24.9 (0.98)	19.4 (0.76)	24.4 (0.96)	428.4 (16.87)
Average rainfall mm (inches)	0.1 (0.00)	0.5 (0.02)	6.2 (0.24)	17.1 (0.67)	49.0 (1.93)	77.4 (3.05)	63.8 (2.51)	51.2 (2.02)	34.1 (1.34)	18.5 (0.73)	3.4 (0.13)	0.5 (0.02)	321.7 (12.67)
Average snowfall cm (inches)	19.4 (7.6)	13.6 (5.4)	18.5 (7.3)	5.8 (2.3)	2.8 (1.1)	0.0 (0.0)	0.0 (0.0)	0.0 (0.0)	1.1 (0.4)	6.4 (2.5)	16.1 (6.3)	26.8 (10.6)	110.5 (43.5)
Mean monthly sunshine hours	99.0	125.7	153.5	228.7	271.7	292.4	333.8	290.5	188.5	169.8	95.7	84.0	2,333.2
Percentage possible sunshine	37.4	44.3	41.8	55.3	56.7	59.5	67.5	64.6	49.6	50.9	35.3	33.5	49.7
Source: Environment Canada

== Demographics ==
Historical Population
Year	Pop.	±%
1901	768	—
1906	1,545	+101.2%
1911	1,285	−16.8%
1916	1,334	+3.8%
1921	1,439	+7.9%
1986	1,886	+31.1%
1991	1,827	−3.1%
1996	1,833	+0.3%
2001	1,758	−4.1%
2006	1,634	−7.1%
2011	1,815	+11.1%
2016	1,910	+5.2%

In the 2021 Census of Population conducted by Statistics Canada, Indian Head had a population of 1,902 living in 842 of its 911 total private dwellings, a change of −0.4% from its 2016 population of 1,910. With a land area of 3.08 km^{2} (1.19 sq mi), it had a population density of 617.5/km^{2} (1,599.4/sq mi) in 2021.

In 2011, 50 percent were male and 50 per cent were female. Also in 2011, children under five accounted for approximately 6.1 per cent of the resident population of Indian Head.

According to data from 2001, more than 33.6% of the town's residents identify themselves as Catholic; 48.9% of residents are Protestant, and 12.3% of residents do not practise a religion.

Canada census – Indian Head community profile

	2021	2011
Population	1,902 (-0.4% from 2016)	1,815 (+11.11% from 2006)
Land area	3.08 km^{2} (1.19 sq mi)	3.17 km^{2} (1.22 sq mi)
Population density	617.7/km^{2} (1,600/sq mi)	572.1/km^{2} (1,482/sq mi)
Median age	46.0 (M: 43.6, F: 48.4)	43.7 (M: 40.5, F: 47.8)
Private dwellings	911 (total) 842 (occupied)	809 (total)
Median household income	$73,000

References: 2021 2011

== Government ==
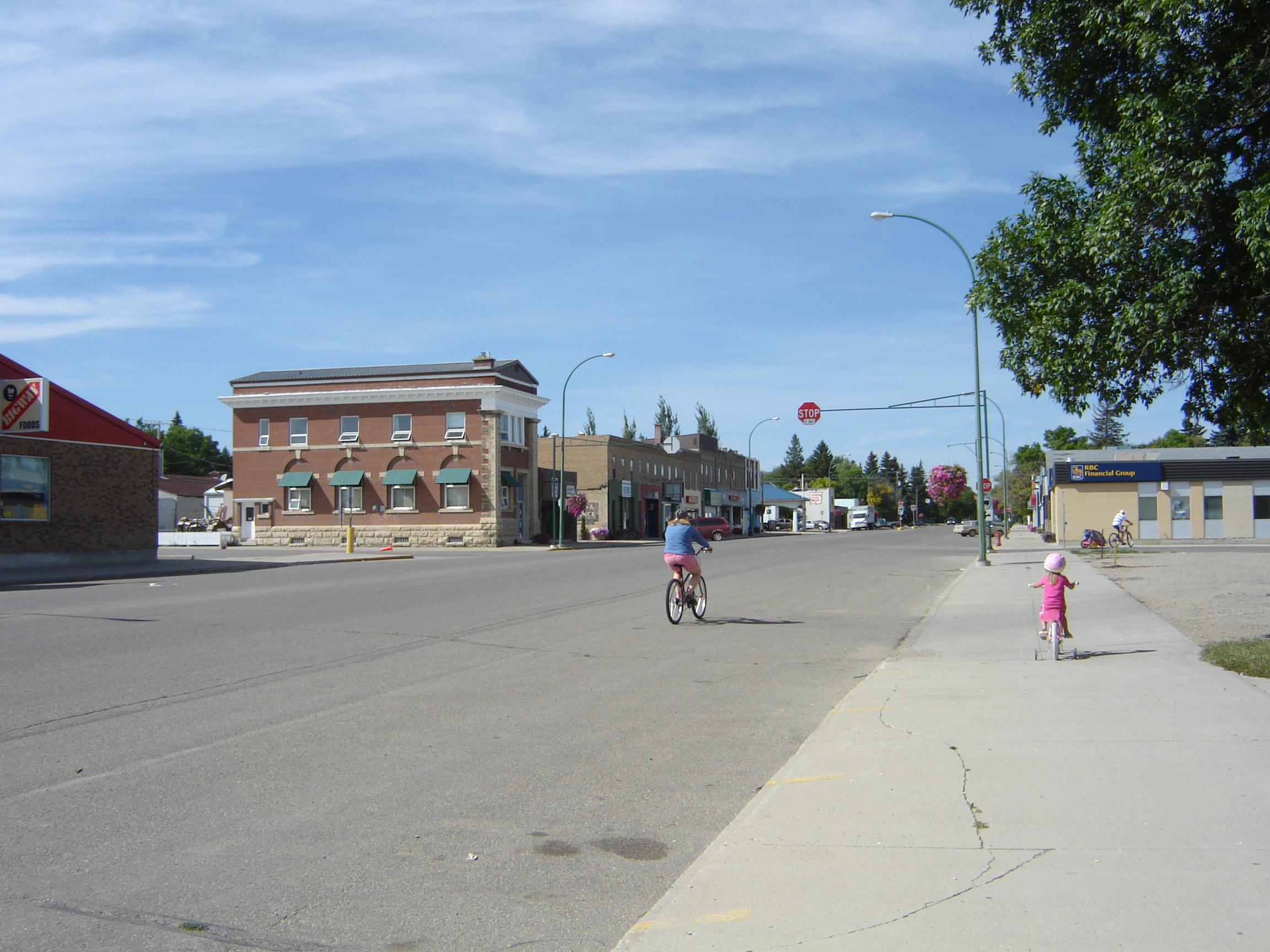
Indian Head streetscape with Film Rescue International (centre left) and Royal Bank (right)

The town of Indian Head has a mayor as the highest ranking government official. The town also elects aldermen or councillors to form the municipal council. Currently, the mayor is Steven Cole and is serving with councillors Pieter Cruson, Alan Hubbs, Charity Palmer, Tim Klein, Chris Simpson, and Nathan Longeau. The town administrator is Cam Thauberger.

Provincially, Indian Head is within the constituency of Indian Head-Milestone served by their Member of legislative assembly, the Honourable Don McMorris. Federally, the Regina—Qu'Appelle riding is represented by their Member of Parliament, Andrew Scheer.

== Infrastructure ==
Even though the provincial government Saskatchewan Air Ambulance system was not established until 1946, Indian Head did call to Charlie Skinner, a pilot in Regina in 1935. Transport was needed to get the doctor from Indian Head to Odessa to treat a critically ill patient during a time when the roads were blocked by snow. Thus began Skinner's Air Service.

The first communication system in Saskatchewan was on the Bell Farm built in 1882 by Major Bell on ten miles (16 km) square or 60,000 acres (240 km^{2}) at Indian Head. The telecommunications system utilised barbed wire for the phone lines.

=== Transportation ===
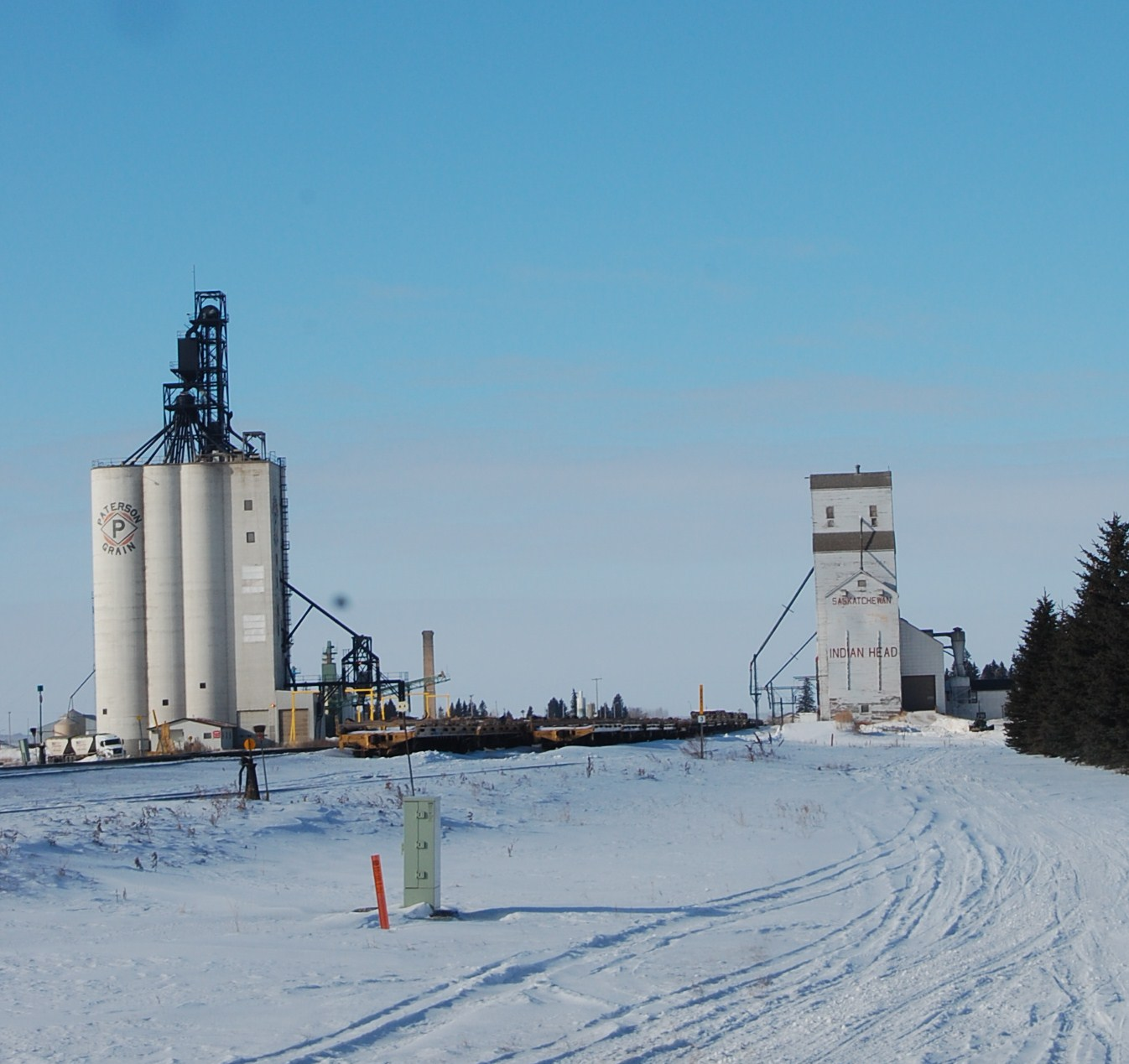
Indian Head grain elevator on a winter day

Indian Head is served by the Canadian Pacific Railway. It is located at the junction of the Trans-Canada Highway (Saskatchewan Highway 1) and Highway 56. It is about 70 kilometres (43 mi) east of the provincial capital city of Regina and 507 kilometres (315 mi) west of Winnipeg.

An Indian trail used by fur traders, and red river carts pulling settlers effects was the first path between Moosomin and Fort Ellice, Manitoba. The transcontinental CPR paralleled this trail when coming through in the late 19th century and early 20th century.

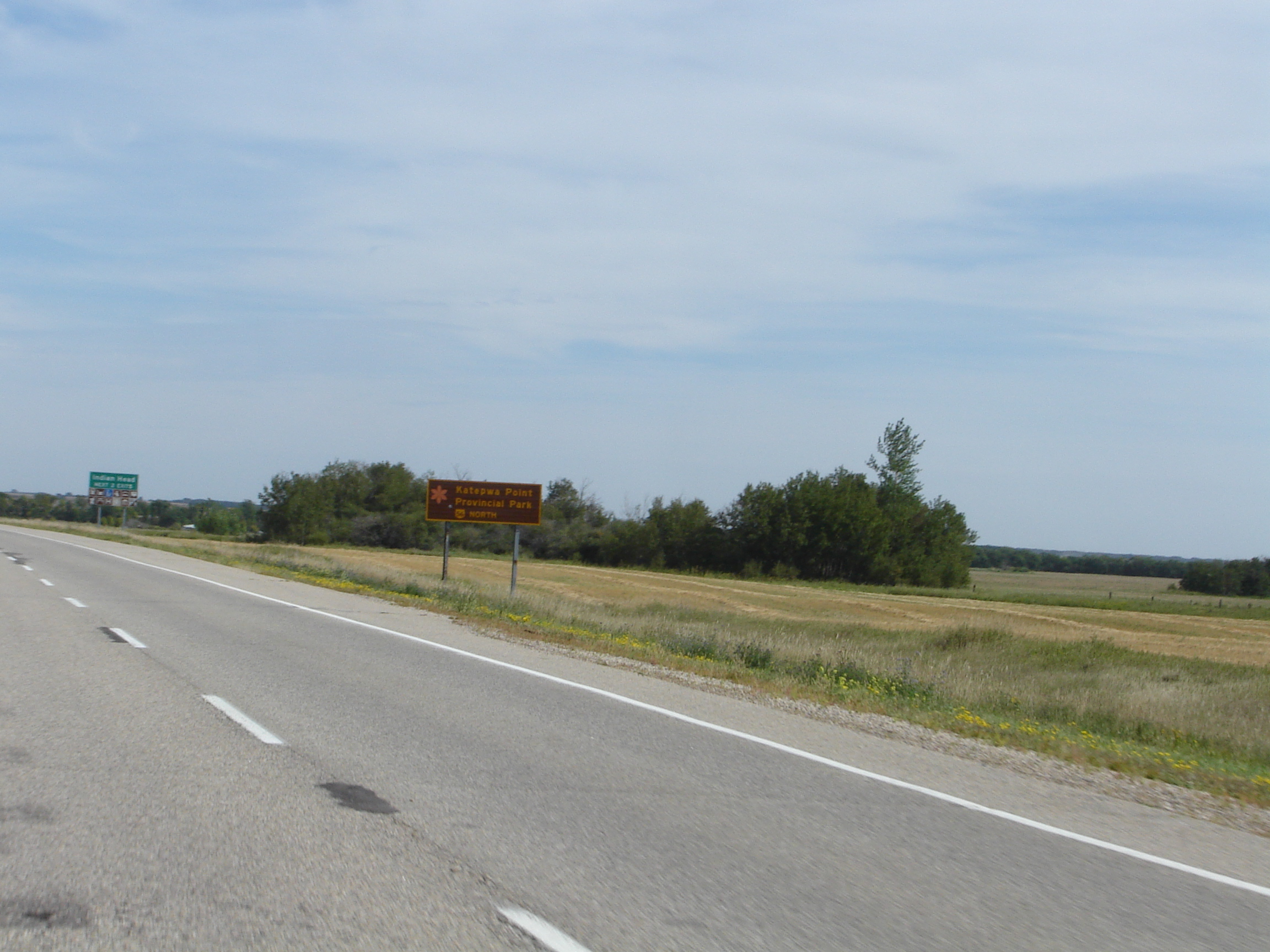
Indian Head next 2 exits. Katepwa Point Provincial Park Sk Hwy 56 North between Qu'Appelle and Regina Saskatchewan Highway 1, the Trans-Canada Highway

Provincial Highway 4, the precursor of the Trans–Canada Saskatchewan Highway 1, followed the surveyed grade of the transcontinental CPR between the Alberta and Manitoba border. Travel along Provincial Highway 4 before the 1940s would have been travelling on the square following the township road allowances, barbed wire fencing and rail lines. As the surveyed township roads were the easiest to travel, the first highway was designed on 90 degree right angle corners as the distance traversed the prairie along range roads and township roads. Two-horse then eight-horse scrapers maintained these early dirt roads.

One of the problems that came about was when the Manitoba survey met the Saskatchewan survey. The Manitoba survey allowed for 100 feet (30 m) road allowances placed east and west every 1 mile (1.6 km). This system was followed west of Manitoba until just north of Indian Head. However, the Saskatchewan survey conducted in 1887, allowed for 66-foot (20 m) road allowances and placed roads east and west every 2 miles (3.2 km). The two surveys needed a 2 miles (3.2 km) correction which took years to smooth out.

Originally roadwork was done by horsepower, and the municipality owned its horses and equipment. It was found that roadwork under the supervision of a councillor cost half as much as that under a road commission system. There were problems with labour. One cold November payday the whole crew quit, with not one left to even feed the horses. In 1909 a foreman shot one of his crew; the [Indian Head] council minutes make no further comment.

— History of Indian Head and District Inc., Indian Head: history of Indian Head and district (1981)

Agriculture is one of Saskatchewan's main industries and taking grain to elevators was first accomplished by horse and cart, to be replaced around World War I by truck travel. Long haul trucking flourished between 1950 and 1970, and the Trans–Canada was completed across Canada by 1970. Since the 1970s, 17 times the number of grain trucks and 95 percent of goods transported now are hauled by truck across Saskatchewan.

== Education ==
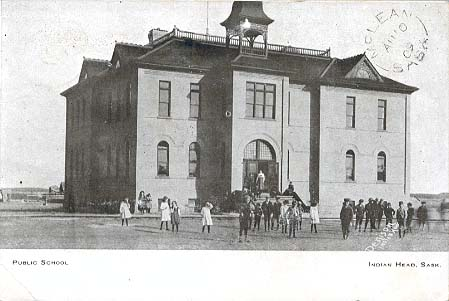
Public school, Indian Head, 1900s

The Robert Webster High School hosts the Broncs athletic teams and is part of the Prairie Valley School Division No. 208 along with the Indian Head Elementary School. Indian Head Elementary School features classes Pre-Kindergarten to grade 6 with about 205 enrolled. The high school supports grades 7 to 12 with an enrollment of about 225 pupils.

The Southeast Regional College has a district campus office located in Indian Head which will support grade 12 equivalency general education development, post-secondary classes supported by the University of Regina, University of Saskatchewan, SIAST and the Certified General Accountants Association. Some post-secondary skills and career services are additionally available.

Historically there were quite a number of one-room school houses in the area of Indian Head the first, Indian Head School District #49, was established in 1886. It was followed soon after by Wide Awake School District #54. Other schools were Sunny South School District #61, Katepwe School District #116, Rose Valley School District # 191 Fair Play School District #192, Blackwood School District #241, Flen Lynn School District #333 Burnsdale School District #777, Jubilee School District #1122, Interlake School District #1565, Sunny Slope School District #1843, Squirrel Hills School District #4058, Lake Marqerite School District #1237 and Spring Coulee School.

== Indian Head Hospital ==
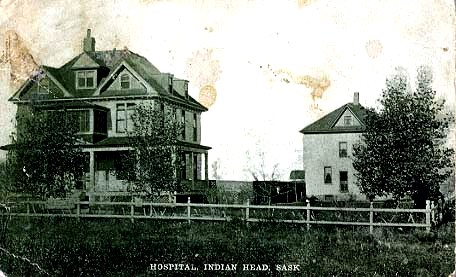
General Hospital, Indian Head, opened in 1905

Indian Head hospital opened in 1905 with an attached nursing training school. "Nursing training continued until 1925 at Indian Head"; the hospital remained open in 2006 with 15 beds.

The new hospital to this day, "provides inpatient, emergency and outpatient/ambulatory care services" with "[o]utpatient/[a]mbulatory Care provid[ing] scheduled services or services ordered by [a] physician. Laboratory and x-ray services are provided on weekdays during regular hours with an order from [a] physician [and] [v]isiting professional services...available at various times each month."

== Museums and other points of interest ==
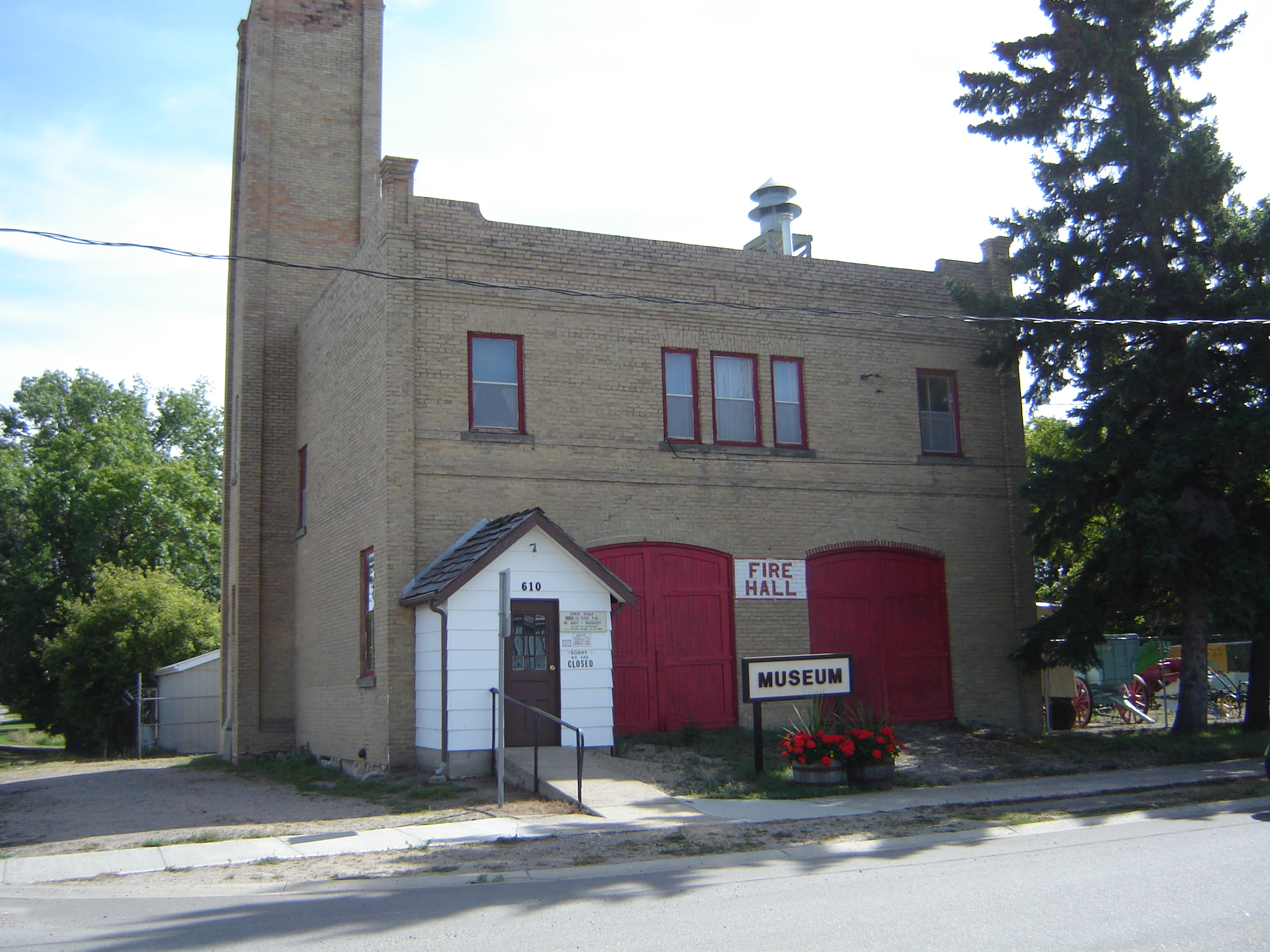
Indian Head museum

Charhead Ranch Farm features Charolais cattle, dairy operation and Welsh ponies on this 75-year-old farm.

The Bell Farm is amongst the top ten most endangered sites listed by the Heritage Canada Foundation. Having the silo centrally located in the round barn greatly reduced labour involved in livestock feeding and resulted in a stronger facility than the rectangular structures. It is currently undergoing re-construction and preservation.

Thirty-two hectares of federal crown land comprise the Indian Head Migratory Bird Sanctuary located 2 kilometres (1.2 mi) south of Indian Head. The Canada Agriculture Experimental Farm Tree Nursery is a part of the sanctuary lands The Canadian Wildlife Service on its last review felt that the sanctuary should be abolished.

The Prairie Farm Rehabilitation Administration (PFRA) and PFRA shelterbelt centre set up in 1902 features a picnic area with nature trails along with tree nursery, and flora displays. The nursery still establishes farm shelterbelts with its shipments of trees every year across Alberta, Saskatchewan and Manitoba.

Indian Head Experimental Station or Indian Head Research Farm established in 1887 provides innovative research into crops and soil types.

The Indian Head Museum features pioneer artifacts and is hosted in the 1907 fire hall. In the museum yards is a 1926 one-room school house and an 1883 Bell Farm cottage.

== Sports and recreation ==
As early as 1889, Indian Head had established its own curling rink, and in 1904 it was a provincial sport. Indian Head was one of four rinks which competed in the first curling bonspiel of the North-West Territories in 1892 playing against Calgary, Regina, and Qu'Appelle.

Indian Head established its hockey team by 1900, one of the first of a dozen or so in the North-West Territories.

After World War II, for a period of time, baseball tournaments were held in Saskatoon and Indian Head offering thousands of dollars in prize money. In the 1950s, Indian Head hosted an all-black baseball team called the Rockets; the players were Negro league players from Jacksonville, Florida. The team was extremely popular and reportedly brought thousands of people to the town to watch them play. The Rockets were inducted into the Saskatchewan Baseball Hall of Fame in 2022.

Indian Head is home to the Saskatchewan Rural Sports Hall of Fame and Museum established in 1992 which commemorates athletes from rural Saskatchewan who achieved fame in the big leagues.

In 2013, the Indian Head Broncs hosted and won the 3A 9 Man Provincial High School Football Championship, defeating the Meadow Lake Spartans 14–7.

== Media ==
The community is served by the community newspaper the Indian Head-Wolseley News, which is owned by Grasslands News Group.

The local Internet news program Indian Head Today has been featured on CBC's The National.

Indian Head was a major filming location for the Canadian television sitcom Little Mosque on the Prairie, which aired on CBC.

Indian Head is also a major film processing center for old motion and still films, processing is done by Film Rescue International. Film Rescue – Revealers Of Lost And Found Treasures Since 1999

== History ==
=== First non-aboriginal settlers ===
The first settlers were from Ontario and of Scottish origin. They moved into the district in 1882, ahead of the Canadian Pacific Railway. The Bell Farm at Indian Head comprised 53,000 acres (210 km^{2}). Such settlement was so huge and out of the ordinary that on many occasions the passenger trains would stop and let the passengers watch the harvesting operation.

=== Historical economy ===
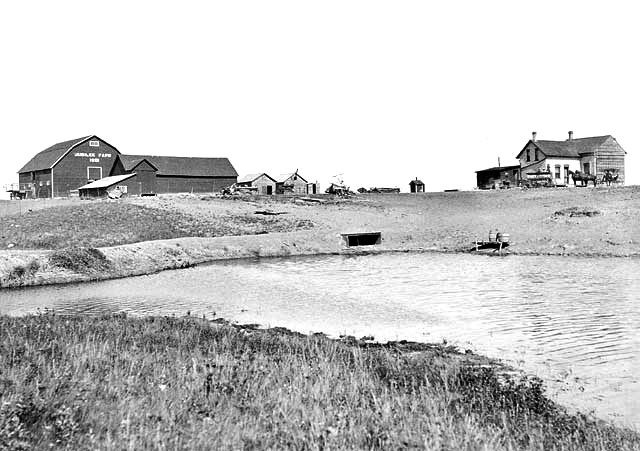
Holden Farm

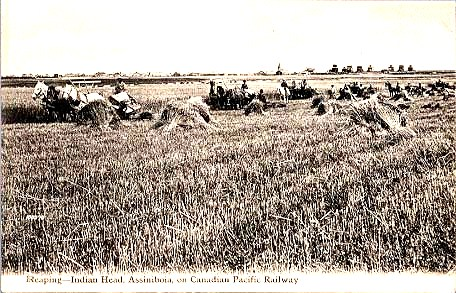
Reaping, Indian Head, Assiniboia, on Canadian Pacific Railway

Historically, according to the Department of Agriculture, the Indian Head district ranked highest for wheat production in the North-West Territories in 1903, 1904 and 1905. The Indian Head Experimental Station exceeded the Brandon Experimental station by seven bushels of wheat per acre for ten years. For a town of population 1,800 in 1905, it boasted twelve grain elevators which were erected along the Canadian Pacific Railway, with each elevator having the capacity to hold approximately 350,000 bushels. This location handled a higher quantity of grain in 1902 in the initiatory shipment stage than any other inland port in the world.

The North-West Rebellion in 1885 caused the farmland of the Qu'Appelle Valley Farming Company to lie untended as their horses and wagons were used in the military engagement. The summer of 1886 provided a good crop as the land was allowed to collect moisture. The Indian Head Experimental Farm then followed up and said: "fallowing the land is the best preparation to ensure a crop."

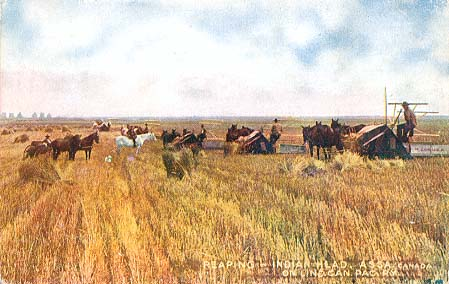
Reaping near Indian Head, 1900s

The Territorial Grain Growers' Association (TGGA) was formed in the winter of 1901 at Indian Head. It was a collective of farmers in the Qu'Appelle Valley responding to the Sinatluta Case. In the fall of 1901 farmers were trying to ship a large harvest and they could not sell it due to a boxcar shortage. The existing elevators were not set up to hold the amount of grain that year. Farmers lost about half of a record wheat crop. William Richard Motherwell became the first president and pressed for a change to the Manitoba Act which would allow farmers access to railway cars on a first-come, first-served basis.

In the early 20th century Indian Head was the financial centre of the district and distribution point. Three banks established branches, the Opera House was erected by Mr. Osment, and The Club conducted its operations within the opera house block. The Lady Minto Hospital was erected at a cost of CA$6,000. ($6,000 is equivalent to $215,000 in present day terms.) Streetscapes were extremely lively before the arrival of motorised automobiles, trucks and farm implements. Farmers' drives to Indian Head were extremely frequent; expeditions to Regina, the nearest city, the Qu'Appelle Valley and near towns were considerably less convenient than they became once car and truck engines existed and Number 1 Highway was vastly upgraded from the 1950s onwards: trips were most easily made by the frequent trains, which carried passengers in early days until substantially replaced by road vehicles.

=== Dominion Experimental Farm ===
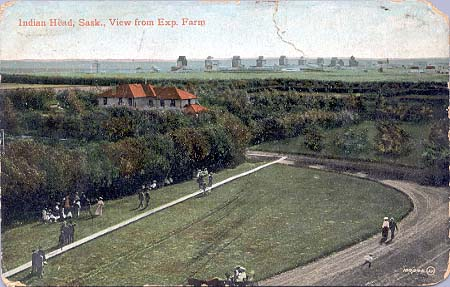
Town from the Experimental Farm, 1900s

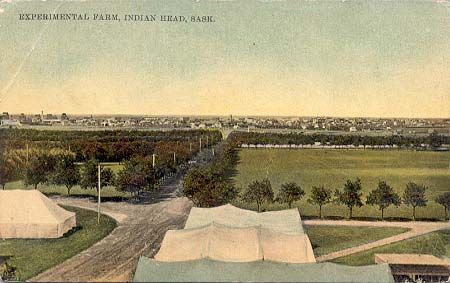
Dominion Experimental Farm, 1911

In 1887 the Dominion Experimental Farm was founded as one of the original research stations in Canada. Today it is still doing research and giving valuable information to farmers. Settlement began to accelerate seriously after 1900 and by the outbreak of World War I in 1914 its population had reached 1200. In 1902, the PFRA tree nursery was inaugurated and is still shipping out several million trees each year for farm shelterbelts in the three prairie provinces. "The Indian Head Experimental Farm [was] responsible for the whole of the North-West Territories. The intent of the farm was to meet the needs of new settlers for reliable information on the best farming methods and practices for local conditions. Long-term studies with field crops, animal husbandry and horticulture were initiated….During the 1930s, a concerted effort against the blowing topsoil by the Indian Head Experimental Farm and [other] …stations … was effective in developing tillage methods that reduced soil erosion. The post-war years saw great changes with the introduction of selective chemicals to control insects, plant diseases and [w]eeds. Programs were set up at all stations to advise farmers on the use of these new chemicals. Nutrition and management studies at Indian Head [and other stations] have done much to improve livestock production in the province."

=== Early centre of arrival in and departure from the North-West Territories ===
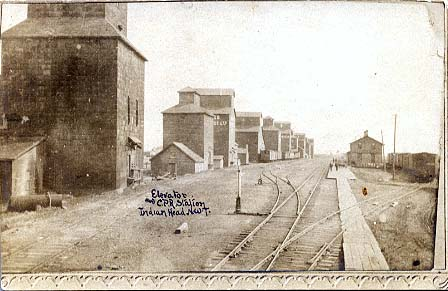
CPR elevators and station Indian Head NWT, ie prior to formation of the Province of Saskatchewan in 1905

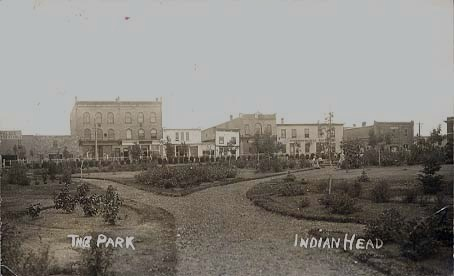
Park with hotel, 1900s

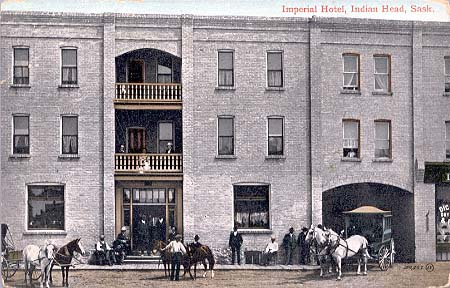
Imperial Hotel, Indian Head 1900s. Note absence of motor vehicles.

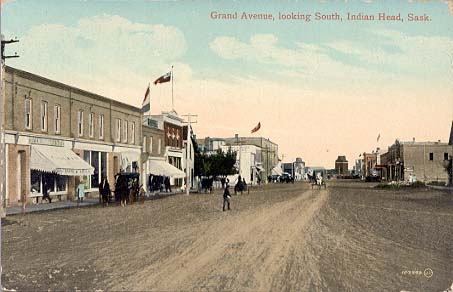
Grand Avenue, Indian Head, 1910s.

Indian Head main street identified in publication as "191-" but quite likely much earlier, before the creation of the Province of Saskatchewan in 1910

In the days of the last two decades of the 19th century, Indian Head was a significant centre for people arriving in the North-West Territories by train from Ontario. It was necessary for the town to have hotel accommodation for travellers and several were on hand.

Their appearance now seems extraordinarily substantial but at the beginning of settlement of what was later to become the provinces of Saskatchewan and Alberta it appeared certain that the population of the eventual provinces would be substantially greater than it turned out and that the provincial capital, whatever it might be, would be vastly larger.

Indian Head streetscapes were remarkably lively in the town's early days, when automobiles and trucks had not yet arrived and agricultural, shopping and social expeditions to town were extremely frequent compared to later days when expeditions to Regina or the Qu'Appelle Valley became significantly faster and more convenient than after World War I, when automobiles and trucks began to become common: until then, expeditions to the city generally conducted by train—with a lengthy interruption with little travel of any kind from the 1929 onset of the Great Depression until the 1945 end of World War II.

=== Philharmonic Society ===
The Philharmonic Society in Indian Head was established in the early 20th century. In 1914, A.S. Vogt (founder of the Mendelssohn Choir) claimed that Saskatchewan's excellent choral work was one benefit of the province’s isolation and corresponding need to create its own art.

=== Churches ===
At its outset, Indian Head had substantial churches, though as elsewhere in Canada religiosity significantly declined beginning in the late 1960s. In the beginning, the denominations were principally Presbyterian, Methodist, Anglican, and Roman Catholic.

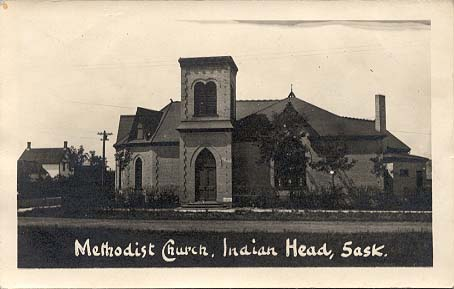
Indian Head Methodist Church 190-?

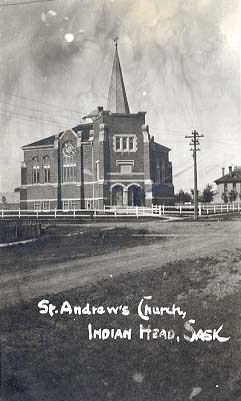
St. Andrew's Presbyterian Church, Indian Head, 190-?

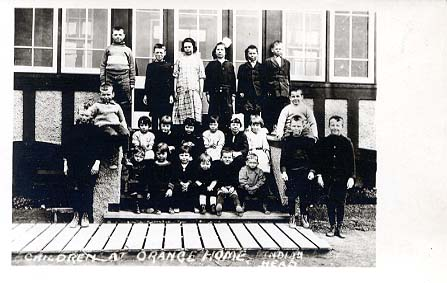
Children at Orange Orphanage, Indian Head. 192-?

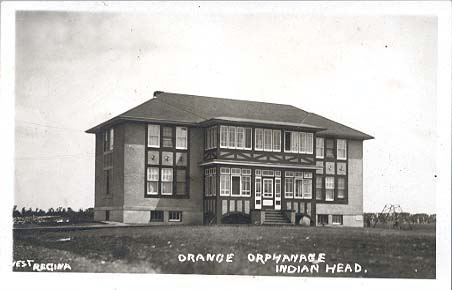
Orange Orphanage circa 1925

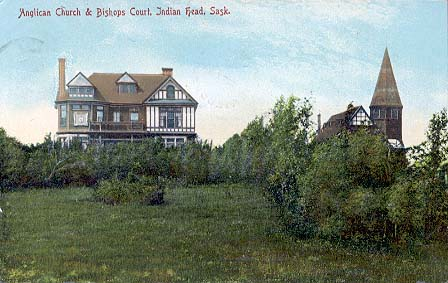
Bishop's Court and Anglican church, Indian Head, after 1905

Indian Head's Methodist church became United Church in 1925 but as in nearby Qu'Appelle the Presbyterian church divided, with a portion of the congregation constituting a continuing separate Presbyterian church. The Indian Head and Qu'Appelle Presbyterian churches were demanding if not downright prestigious and obtained clergy of considerable talent, who on leaving proceeded to urban congregations such as First Presbyterian in Regina. Thereafter the Presbyterians shared a clergyman with the Presbyterian church in Qu'Appelle, which had withdrawn from the old Presbyterian church thereupon church union. "In 1923 the Orange Benevolent Society, then a substantial service club of the Loyal Orange Lodge established the Orange Home and Orange Home Farm for children from distressed families."

The Anglican Church (until 1955 the "Church of England") Diocese of Qu'Appelle was originally centred in the nearby town of Qu'Appelle, whose parish church was the pro-cathedral for southern Saskatchewan. The Hon. Edgar Dewdney was appointed Lieutenant-Governor of the North-West Territories (sic) December 3, 1881, and it was not immediately clear that he would choose Pile-of-Bones, renamed Regina in 1882—where he had acquired land to sell for private profit—as the capital of the Territories. It had previously been thought likely that other sites would be chosen, including Prince Albert, the seat-of-government of the Territories' District of Saskatchewan, Fort Qu'Appelle and Qu'Appelle: this accounts for the Church of England's original choice of Qu'Appelle and uncertainty as to what to choose in the alternative. Bishop's Court, the residence of the diocesan bishop, was relocated from Qu'Appelle to Indian Head in 1895 before being further relocated to Regina. Such matters were of substantially greater interest back then and would remain so until the end of the 1960s when in Indian Head as in other Canadian cities and towns participation in religion generally began steadily decreasing. Nevertheless, St. Joseph's Roman Catholic Church had "[t]he first...built in the early 1900s, and the present church was completed in 1961."

== Notable people ==
- Lynne Bowen, award-winning writer, oral historian and UBC professor
- Bill Davies, went on to establish the Saskatchewan Federation of Labour (SFL).
- Dave Karpa, he played in the National Hockey League for the Quebec Nordiques, Mighty Ducks of Anaheim, Carolina Hurricanes and New York Rangers between 1993 and 2003.
- Jeff Lank, drafted by the Montreal Canadiens in 1993, traded to the Philadelphia Flyers in 1995 and played two games for that team during the 1999-2000 season.
- Eric Peterson, Canadian stage and television actor, known for his roles in three major Canadian series – Street Legal, Corner Gas and This is Wonderland.
- Ron Robison is a Western Hockey League Commissioner, as well as the former Head of Hockey Canada.
- Sinclair Ross was born near Shellbrook, but attended school in Indian Head until grade 11. Ross is a noteworthy Canadian author best known for his fiction about life in the Canadian prairies, especially As For Me and My House (1941). A monument in his honour has been erected in Indian Head by Saskatchewan artists and readers with a bronze statue sculpted by Joe Fafard.
- Lorne Scott, Environmentalist, former provincial MLA and Member of the Order of Canada

== Bibliography ==
- McLennon, David. "Indian Head." Encyclopedia of Saskatchewan.
- N.a. (1984), Indian Head: History of Indian Head and District. Digitalised online by Our Roots/Nos Racines, University of Calgary, 2006. Retrieved 10 May 2009.
