= Assembly of First Nations leadership elections =

Assembly of First Nations (National Indian Brotherhood before 1982) leadership elections are held every three years to elect the national chief of the Assembly of First Nations. Each chief of a First Nation in Canada is eligible to cast a vote. Currently there are 634 eligible voters.

AFN rules state that a candidate needs 60% of the votes to win the election. If multiple candidates are on the ballot, the candidate with the fewest votes on each ballot is dropped until one candidate has reached the required percentage of votes. Additionally, any candidate who receives less than 15 per cent of the vote on a ballot is automatically dropped.

If only two candidates remain, however, the candidate with fewer votes is not dropped from the ballot automatically, but rather the race continues to another ballot until the leading candidate reaches 60 per cent or the trailing candidate voluntarily concedes.

== 1968 ==
Winner: Walter Dieter

== 1970 ==
Winner: George Manuel

== 1972 ==
Winner: George Manuel

== 1974 ==
Winner: George Manuel

== 1976 ==
Held in Whitehorse, Yukon on September 16, 1976.

Winner: Noel Starblanket (acclaimed)

== 1978 ==
Winner: Noel Starblanket

== 1980 ==
Winner: Delbert Riley

== 1982 ==
Held in Penticton, British Columbia on April 21, 1982.

=== First ballot ===
Candidate	Delegate Support	Percentage
David Ahenakew	190	55.72
Delbert Riley	67	19.65
Arthur Manuel	48	14.08
Sykes Powderface	26	7.62
Clive Linklater	10	2.93
Total	341	100%

For this election the two candidates with the fewest votes on the first ballot were dropped. This applied to Linklater and Powderface. Riley then announced he would withdraw.

=== Second ballot ===
Candidate	Delegate Support	Percentage
David Ahenakew	259	83.82
Arthur Manuel	50	16.18
Total	309	100%

== 1985 ==
Held in Vancouver, British Columbia on July 30, 1985.

=== First ballot ===
Candidate	Delegate Support	Percentage
Georges Erasmus		
David Ahenakew		
Simon Lucas	69	
Graydon Nicholas	44	
Ernie Daniels	10	
Total		100%

=== Second ballot ===
Candidate	Delegate Support	Percentage
Georges Erasmus	274	54.26
David Ahenakew	231	45.74
Total	505	100%

== 1988 ==
Held in Edmonton, Alberta.

Winner: Georges Erasmus

== 1991 ==
Held in Winnipeg, Manitoba on June 11, 1991.

=== First ballot ===
Candidate	Delegate Support	Percentage
Ovide Mercredi		
Bill Wilson		
Phil Fontaine	164	
Neil Sterritt	13	
Mike Mitchell		
Total		100%

== 1994 ==
Held in Saskatoon, Saskatchewan on July 6, 1994.

=== First ballot ===
Candidate	Delegate Support	Percentage
Ovide Mercredi		54.0%
Wallace McKay		
Mike Kanentakeron Mitchell		
Delia Opekokew		
Konrad Sioui		
Total		100%

=== Third ballot ===
Candidate	Delegate Support	Percentage
Ovide Mercredi		60.8%
Wallace McKay		
Total		100%

== 1997 ==
Held in Vancouver, British Columbia on July 30, 1997.

=== First ballot ===
Candidate	Delegate Support	Percentage
Ovide Mercredi	127	
Phil Fontaine	126	
Wendy Grant-John	123	
Joe Dion		
Larry Sault		
Bob Manuel		
Total		100%

=== Second ballot ===
Candidate	Delegate Support	Percentage
Phil Fontaine		
Wendy Grant-John		
Ovide Mercredi		
Joe Dion		
Larry Sault		
Total		100%

=== Third ballot ===
Candidate	Delegate Support	Percentage
Phil Fontaine		
Wendy Grant-John		
Ovide Mercredi		
Total		100%

=== Fourth ballot ===
Candidate	Delegate Support	Percentage
Phil Fontaine		
Wendy Grant-John		
Total		100%

== 2000 ==
Held in Ottawa, Ontario on July 12, 2000.

=== First ballot ===
Candidate	Delegate Support	Percentage
Matthew Coon Come	244	50.31
Phil Fontaine	202	41.65
Lawrence Martin	26	5.36
Marilyn Buffalo	13	2.68
Total	485	100%

=== Second ballot ===
Candidate	Delegate Support	Percentage
Matthew Coon Come	287	58
Phil Fontaine	207	42
Total	494	100%

== 2003 ==
Held in Edmonton, Alberta on July 16, 2003.

=== First ballot ===
Candidate	Delegate Support	Percentage
Phil Fontaine	292	51.59
Roberta Jamieson	167	29.50
Matthew Coon Come	105	18.55
Rejected ballots	2	0.35
Total	566	100%

=== Second ballot ===
Candidate	Delegate Support	Percentage
Phil Fontaine	338	60.90
Roberta Jamieson	217	39.09
Total	555	100%

== 2006 ==
Held in Vancouver, British Columbia on July 12, 2006.

Candidate	Delegate Support	Percentage
Phil Fontaine	373	76.12
Bill Wilson	117	23.88
Total	490	100%

== 2009 ==
The 2009 convention was held in Calgary, Alberta on July 22.

At the close of nominations on June 16, the declared candidates were AFN's British Columbia regional chief Shawn Atleo, Roseau River First Nation chief Terry Nelson, Federation of Saskatchewan Indian Nations chief Perry Bellegarde, British Columbia land claims negotiator Bill Wilson and former Union of Ontario Indians chief John Beaucage.

Beginning with the second ballot, the convention went into an unprecedented deadlock, with six successive ballots in which the final two candidates effectively tied at roughly 50 per cent of the vote. Under AFN rules, a candidate requires 60 per cent of the vote to win unless their opponent voluntarily concedes the race. Bellegarde conceded after the eighth ballot, on which Atleo had surged ahead to a 58 per cent finish.

=== First ballot ===
Candidate	Delegate Support	Percentage
Shawn Atleo	238	43.11
Perry Bellegarde	162	29.35
John Beaucage	84	15.21
Terry Nelson	57	10.32
Bill Wilson	11	1.99
Total	552	100%

Nelson and Wilson were automatically dropped after the first ballot, as both failed to garner 15 per cent of the vote. Both candidates endorsed Bellegarde on the second ballot. Beaucage, as the last-place finisher among the three remaining candidates, voluntarily dropped out shortly after the ballot results were announced, also endorsing Bellegarde.

=== Second ballot ===
Candidate	Delegate Support	Percentage
Shawn Atleo	276	50.36
Perry Bellegarde	272	49.64
Total	548	100%

=== Third ballot ===
Candidate	Delegate Support	Percentage
Shawn Atleo	266	50.09
Perry Bellegarde	265	49.90
Total	531	100%

=== Fourth ballot ===
Candidate	Delegate Support	Percentage
Perry Bellegarde	267	50.19
Shawn Atleo	264	49.62
Rejected ballots	1	0.19
Total	532	100%

=== Fifth ballot ===
Candidate	Delegate Support	Percentage
Perry Bellegarde	254	49.9
Shawn Atleo	254	49.9
Rejected ballots	1	0.2
Total	509	100%

=== Sixth ballot ===
Candidate	Delegate Support	Percentage
Shawn Atleo	256	51.4
Perry Bellegarde	242	48.6
Total	498	100%

=== Seventh ballot ===
Candidate	Delegate Support	Percentage
Shawn Atleo	259	53.5
Perry Bellegarde	225	46.5
Total	484	100%

=== Eighth ballot ===
Candidate	Delegate Support	Percentage
Shawn Atleo	265	58.11
Perry Bellegarde	189	41.45
Rejected ballots	2	0.44
Total	456	100%

== 2012 ==
The 2012 convention was held in Toronto, Ontario on July 18, 2012

At the close of nominations on June 12, the declared candidates were Shawn Atleo, Diane Kelly, Bill Erasmus, Terrance Nelson, Pamela Palmater, Ellen Gabriel, Joan Jack and George Stanley.

=== First ballot ===
Candidate	Delegate Support	Percentage
Shawn Atleo	284	52.59
Pamela Palmater	95	17.59
Diane Kelly	39	7.22
Terry Nelson	35	6.48
Ellen Gabriel	33	6.11
Bill Erasmus	29	5.37
Joan Jack	20	3.70
George Stanley	5	0.93
Total	540	100%

=== Second ballot ===
Candidate	Delegate Support	Percentage
Shawn Atleo	318	59.44
Pamela Palmater	107	20.00
Bill Erasmus	34	6.36
Diane Kelly	31	5.79
Terry Nelson	25	4.67
Ellen Gabriel	17	3.18
Total	535	100%

=== Third ballot ===
Candidate	Delegate Support	Percentage
Shawn Atleo	341	66.60
Pamela Palmater	141	27.54
Bill Erasmus	30	5.86
Total	512	100%

== 2014 ==
The 2014 leadership election took place on December 10. The candidates were Perry Bellegarde, the chief of the Federation of Saskatchewan Indian Nations and the runner-up to Atleo in 2009; Ghislain Picard, the AFN's regional chief for Quebec and Labrador and the organization's interim chief since Atleo's resignation; and Leon Jourdain, the former grand chief of the Treaty 3 area in Manitoba and Northwestern Ontario.

Candidate	Delegate Support	Percentage
Perry Bellegarde	291	62.98
Ghislain Picard	136	29.43
Leon Jourdain	35	7.57
Total	462	100%

== 2018 ==
The 2018 leadership election took place on July 25, 2018, at the Annual General Assembly in Vancouver, British Columbia. Loretta Pete Lambert, of the Little Pine Cree Nation in Saskatchewan, was the chief electoral officer. The candidates were the incumbent, Perry Bellegarde, from the Little Black Bear First Nation; policy analyst Russell Diabo, a member of the Mohawk Nation at Kahnawake; Grand Chief of Manitoba Keewatinowi Okimakanak Sheila North, a member of the Bunibonibee Cree Nation; economist and former President of the Council of the Haida Nation Miles Richardson; and Katherine Whitecloud, former Manitoba regional chief for the AFN, and member of Wipazoka Wakpa Dakota Nation.

=== First ballot ===
Candidate	Delegate Support	Percentage
Perry Bellegarde	286	53.1
Sheila North	106	19.7
Miles Richardson	87	16.2
Russell Diabo	40	7.4
Katherine Whitecloud	19	3.5
Total	538	100.0

=== Second ballot ===
Candidate	Delegate Support	Percentage
Perry Bellegarde	328	62.8
Sheila North	125	23.9
Miles Richardson	59	11.3
Russell Diabo	10	1.9
Total	522	100.0

== 2021 ==
RoseAnne Archibald secured victory on July 8, 2021, after her rival, Reginald Bellerose, conceded. The election had stretched to a second day and went to a fifth round of voting after neither Archibald nor Bellerose received the necessary 60% of votes to win. That remained the case when the Assembly of First Nations announced the fifth-ballot results, but Bellerose announced he was withdrawing from the race before a sixth round of voting could begin.

== See also ==
- Presidents of Inuit Tapiriit Kanatami
- Metis National Council
