= Roberta Jamieson =

Roberta L. Jamieson, OC is a Canadian lawyer and First Nations activist. She was the first Indigenous woman ever to earn a law degree in Canada, the first non-Parliamentarian to be appointed an ex officio member of a House of Commons committee, and the first woman appointed as Ontario Ombudsman.

== History ==
Jamieson is a member of the Six Nations of the Grand River. She was educated at McGill University and the University of Western Ontario, graduating with a law degree in 1976. She worked primarily as a policy advisor in government bodies, including as a commissioner on the Indian Commission of Ontario from 1985 to 1989 and as Ontario's provincial ombudsman from 1989 to 1999.

Jamieson was the first non-Parliamentarian to be appointed an ex officio member of a special House of Commons committee on Indian self-government.

Jamieson has also been recognized for her work in developing and promoting alternative dispute resolution methods. She received the Goodman Fellowship from the University of Toronto in 1991, and the international Association for Conflict Resolution's Mary Parker Follet Award in 1992. She was awarded 13 April 1994 the Order of Canada and invested on 1 March 1995 as a Member of the Order of Canada.

In 2001 Jamison was elected as Chief of Six Nations, the first woman to hold the position. She was a candidate for the leadership of the Assembly of First Nations at their 2003 leadership convention, losing to Phil Fontaine but finishing ahead of incumbent chief Matthew Coon Come.

Jamieson was awarded a National Aboriginal Achievement Award in 1998 for her achievement in law and justice. She was subsequently named president and chief executive officer of the award's parent organization, the National Aboriginal Achievement Foundation, in 2004. The non-profit raises funds from government, corporate and the private sector to disperse bursaries and scholarships to support Indigenous students in post-secondary education.

Roberta L. Jamieson received the Inter-American Award at the Conference of the Americas on International Education in October 2017. This award celebrates achievements made by renowned individuals that have proven themselves through their contribution to building cultural links between different nations of the Americas.

On 30 June 2016, Jamieson was promoted to an Officer of the Order of Canada by Governor General David Johnston for "her contributions to indigenous people across Canada, particularly her work to improve funding, access and opportunities for indigenous youth in the area of education."

Her charitable activities include being a founding board member of the Canadian Native Law Students Association and the Centre for Research in Women's Health. She is also a founding chair of the international media arts festival ImagineNATIVE which showcases the work of Indigenous artists. In the past she served as an advisory committee member to the Minister of Heritage Canada on the National Gathering on Aboriginal Artistic Expression and on the National Gathering on Cultural Tourism.
