= First Nations education jurisdiction in British Columbia =

Legal framework for First Nations education in British Columbia

The First Nations jurisdiction over education in British Columbia has gradually evolved, first established in 2006, and becoming operational in 2022, under a unique legal framework unlike the other provinces and territories in Canada.

== Organizations ==
=== First Nations Education Steering Committee and First Nations Schools Association ===
The First Nations Education Steering Committee policy and advocacy organization which represents a group of First Nations in British Columbia.

The First Nations Schools Association represents a group of First Nations schools.

The First Nations Education Steering Committee was founded in 1992 and the First Nations Schools Association was founded in 1996, as a response to a lack of governmental progress in meeting Indigenous demands for improvements to the schooling system.

The First Nations Education Steering Committee has created provincial Indigenous curriculums for teachers.

=== First Nations Education Authority ===
The First Nations Education Authority is a regulatory body established by participating First Nations with education jurisdiction agreements.

While the First Nations Education Authority was nominally established by the 2006 Education Jurisdiction Framework Agreement, it was only established operationally in 2022.

== History ==
=== National Indian Brotherhood proposal ===
In 1972, the National Indian Brotherhood proposed First Nations having autonomy K-12 education in their areas.

After 1972, the Canadian federal government made unilateral decisions concerning Indigenous education while purporting to accept the document.

=== Nisga'a Agreement in Principle and Nisga'a Final Agreement ===
The 1996 Nisga'a Agreement in Principle and the 1998 Nisga'a Final Agreement granted Nisga’a Nation in the Nass River Valley a degree of autonomy over education in its area.

Under the final agreement, the laws passed by the Nisga'a Nation prevail over provincial and federal legislation in the event of a conflict.

The treaty came into effect on May 11, 2000.

=== Education Jurisdiction Framework Agreement ===
The First Nations Education Jurisdiction Framework Agreement was an agreement between the government of Canada, the government of British Columbia and the First Nations Education Standing Committee, which significantly advanced the matter of First Nations education jurisdiction.

It was signed on July 5, 2006.

The First Nations Jurisdiction over Education in British Columbia Act (Bill C-34; SC 2006, c. 10) is an act of the Parliament of Canada, which gave effect to the agreement. It established the First Nations Education Authority.

The First Nations Education Act (Bill 46; SBC 2007, c. 40) is an act of the Legislative Assembly of British Columbia which gave effect to the agreement and made the necessary changes to provincial legislation.

=== First Nations Control of First Nations Education Act ===
The government of Canada published a draft bill entitled the First Nations Education Act, which was intended to give First Nations across Canada a degree of autonomy concerning K-12 education. The Assembly of First Nations rejected the draft bill outright, for not meeting its five tests.

The First Nations Control of First Nations Education Act (Bill C-33) was introduced by the government into the Parliament of Canada. The minister for Bernard Valcourt claimed that the bill met the five tests that had been laid out by the Assembly of First Nations.

The legislation was supported by Shawn Atleo, the leader of the Assembly of First Nations. The legislation was withdrawn because of First Nation opposition, including from within the Assembly of First Nations, over the considerable control that would have been retained by the federal government. Shawn Atleo was forced to resign as leader due to criticism of his support for the legislation.

=== Tripartite Education Framework Agreement ===
The Tripartite Education Framework Agreement is an agreement between the government of Canada, the government of British Columbia, and the First Nations Education Standing Committee, signed in 2012, which gave additional funding to First Nations schools, in order to ensure parity with other schools.

Until this point, First Nations schools received approximately 25% less funding compared to similarly sized public schools.

=== British Columbia Tripartite Education Agreement ===
The British Columbia Tripartite Education Agreement is an agreement between the Government of Canada, the Government of British Columbia and the First Nations Education Steering Committee, signed in 2018, which gave First Nations additional autonomy over education in their areas.

=== Education Statutes Amendment Act, 2021 ===
The Education Statutes Amendment Act, 2021 (Bill 25; SBC 2021, c. 29) is an act of the Legislative Assembly of British Columbia which gave every First Nation with a jurisdiction agreement the right to certify and regulate teachers in their area.

=== Education jurisdiction agreements ===
Since 2022, First Nations have been able to sign education jurisdiction agreements with Crown–Indigenous Relations and Northern Affairs Canada.
