= David Ahenakew =

Canadian politician (1933-2010)

David Ahenakew CD

National Chief of the Assembly of First Nations
- In office 1982–1985
- Preceded by: Delbert Riley
- Succeeded by: Georges Erasmus

Personal details
- Born: July 28, 1933 Sandy Lake Indian Reserve, Saskatchewan, Canada
- Died: March 12, 2010 (aged 76) Shellbrook, Saskatchewan, Canada
- Awards: Order of Canada (revoked)

David Ahenakew CD (July 28, 1933 – March 12, 2010) was a Canadian First Nations (Cree) politician, and former National Chief of the Assembly of First Nations.

Ahenakew was born at the Sandy Lake Indian Reserve in Saskatchewan. He and his wife, Grace Ahenakew, had five children.

== Military and political career ==
Ahenakew served in the Canadian Forces from 1951 to 1967, during which time he was stationed in Germany, Korea (during the Korean War), and Egypt. An alternate source indicates he served with the Canadian Armed Forces Engineers Corps in Canada, Egypt and Germany from 1962 to 1968 and attained the rank of Sergeant.

In 1967, upon leaving the army, Ahenakew accepted a position with the Saskatchewan government, and became active in the Federation of Saskatchewan Indian Nations (FSIN). He was elected to the position of FSIN president in 1968 (until 1979). He stated that his military experience heavily influenced his choice to pursue politics: "I could see that what was happening to our people was the same kind of exploitation and degradation I had seen in Korea and Egypt."

During his time as FSIN president he released a report entitled "Indian Education in Saskatchewan," and played a role in the founding of the Saskatchewan Indian Cultural College and the Saskatchewan Indian Federated College in 1972.

He received an honorary Doctor of Laws degree from the University of Regina in 1977 and in 1978 he received the John Stratychuk award from the Saskatchewan Human Rights Association.

Ahenakew was appointed to the Order of Canada in the degree of Member in 1978. His citation read: "Member of a United Nations committee and of the World Indigenous Peoples Council. His many years of service to Indians and Métis in Saskatchewan culminated in his election as Chief of the Federation of Saskatchewan Indians, which has revolutionized Indian education in his province." He was stripped of the Order of Canada in 2005 after making controversial remarks about the Holocaust.

On March 9, 1981, he was appointed Director of the Saskatchewan Public Service Commission's Special Programs Unit.

In 1982, he was elected Chief of the Assembly of First Nations, a national representative body for Canadian aboriginals.

== Controversy surrounding antisemitic remarks ==
On December 13, 2002, Ahenakew gave a speech to an FSIN group, which was attended by James Parker, a reporter from the Saskatoon StarPhoenix. He made references to "goddamn immigrants" in Canada during his speech. During a question-and-answer session following his lecture, Ahenakew said that Jews were a disease in Germany and that Hitler was trying to "clean up Europe" when he "fried six million of those guys." He also stated that Israel and the United States (specifically mentioning George W. Bush) were going to start the next world war.

The Germans used to tell me, and I got to know them well because I played soccer against them and with them and so forth. But they used to tell me that you guys are blessed. What we know about the Indians in Canada. They are blessed. But that blessing is being destroyed by your immigrants that are going over there. Especially the Jews, they said. The Second World War was started by the Jews and the Third World War, whatever it is, is between Israel and the Arab countries. I was there as well. But there's going to be a war because the Israelis and the "Bushies" – you know, the bully, the bigot in the United States – tells you that if you're not with me you're against me.

After the session concluded, the StarPhoenix reporter asked him to clarify these remarks, and he explained that while serving in the army after the war, Germans had told him the Jews had provoked the war. The StarPhoenix quoted him as further saying:

The Jews damn near owned all of Germany prior to the war. That's why Hitler came in. He was going to make damn sure that the Jews didn't take over Germany, or even Europe. That's why he fried six million of those guys, you know. Jews would have owned the goddamned world. And look what they're doing now, they're killing people in Arab countries.

The reporter asked how Ahenakew could justify the Holocaust. The StarPhoenix quoted Ahenakew as replying:

How else do you get rid of a disease like that, that's going to take over, that's going to dominate?

=== Public reaction ===
The comments were first circulated in the Canadian national media several days later, and were quickly condemned as antisemitic by Jewish groups, Aboriginal leaders and Canadian politicians alike. Both Perry Bellgarde, president of FSIN, and Matthew Coon Come, AFN national chief, were quick to distance themselves from Ahenakew's comments.

In June 2003, Ahenakew was formally charged by the Saskatchewan Justice Department with promoting hatred.

In an interview in the July/August 2003 edition of This Magazine, Ahenakew expressed to reporter Alex Roslin his dissatisfaction with what he called "racial control" of the media, saying that "when a group of people, a race of people, control the world media, something has to be done about it." The article also quotes claims that Ahenakew had long held racist beliefs against Jews, Blacks and other ethnic groups, and that those beliefs had been hidden from the public.

In connection with the remarks from 2002, which were recorded on tape with his knowledge, Ahenakew was later convicted in July 2005 of willfully promoting hatred against Jews. Ahenakew apologized for the remarks, saying they did not represent his beliefs and that he was "caught up in the heat of the moment. I was attempting to spark debate on what has been happening to our First Nations people." At his trial, he later recanted his apology and blamed his outburst on his diabetes, some wine and a change in medication, a defense that was rejected by the court; he was subsequently fined $1,000. Despite this, he retained his belief that the Jews started the Second World War. Jewish groups, aboriginals and politicians later called for Ahenakew's membership in the Order of Canada to be revoked. The Governor General revoked Ahenakew's membership shortly after his trial.

In June 2006, the conviction was overturned by the Saskatchewan Court of Queen's Bench on the grounds that the trial judge failed to properly take into account that the remarks were uttered in the midst of an angry confrontation with a reporter, and therefore may not have constituted a "willful" promotion of hatred. A new trial was ordered.

=== Second trial ===
Ahenakew was retried in Saskatoon in 2008. In February 2009, Saskatchewan Provincial Court Judge Wilfred Tucker acquitted Ahenakew because his statements, while "revolting, disgusting and untrue" did not show an intent to incite hatred.

== Death ==
Ahenakew died on March 12, 2010 from cancer at a hospital in Shellbrook, Saskatchewan, aged 76.
