= Wade Grant =

Canadian politician

Wade Grant MP
- caləχʷəlenəxʷ 志堅
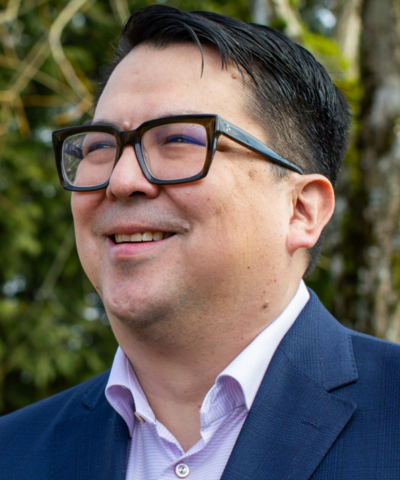

Parliamentary Secretary to the Minister of Environment and Climate Change
- Incumbent
- Assumed office June 5, 2025

Member of Parliament for Vancouver Quadra
- Incumbent
- Assumed office April 28, 2025
- Preceded by: Joyce Murray

Personal details
- Born: 1977 or 1978 (age 48–49)
- Party: Liberal
- Relations: Larry Grant (uncle); Wayne Sparrow (uncle)
- Children: 2
- Parents: Howard Grant (father); Wendy Grant-John (mother)
- Education: University of British Columbia
- Website: wadegrant.liberal.ca

Chinese name
- Traditional Chinese: 志堅
- Simplified Chinese: 志坚
Transcriptions
Standard Mandarin
- Hanyu Pinyin: Zhì Jiān
Yue: Cantonese
- Jyutping: zi^{3} gin^{1}
other Yue
- Taishanese: zi^{1} gen^{1}

Halkomelem name
- Halkomelem: caləχʷəlenəxʷ

Howard Wade Grant MP (Hunʼqumiʼnum: caləχʷəlenəxʷ; Chinese: 志堅; born 1977 or 1978) is a Canadian politician of Musqueam and Chinese descent. He is a member of the Liberal Party and has represented Vancouver Quadra in the House of Commons since being elected in 2025. Grant previously served as a Musqueam band councillor from 2004 to 2014.

== Education ==
Grant studied political science at the University of British Columbia, graduating with a Bachelor of Arts in 2002.

== Political career ==
Grant served as a Musqueam Indian Band councillor from 2004 to 2014, and on the Vancouver Police Board from 2010 to 2014. From 2014 to 2017, he served as a special advisor on aboriginal issues to Christy Clark, the premier of British Columbia. He ran for Vancouver City Council in the 2018 municipal election and lost, coming in 29th place with 15,422 votes.

Since 2019, he has served as an Intergovernmental Affairs Officer for the Musqueam Indian Band. In June 2019, Grant was elected to the First Nations Health Council, and since 2021 he has served as its chair. He has also served as chair of the New Relationship Trust, "an independent non-profit organization dedicated to strengthening First Nations in B.C. through capacity building."

With incumbent Liberal Vancouver Quadra Member of Parliament (MP) Joyce Murray declining to seek re-election, Grant was nominated as the riding's Liberal candidate in March 2025. During the 2025 federal election, Grant supported affordable housing and advocated for oil infrastructure projects to comply with the United Nations Declaration on the Rights of Indigenous Peoples. He was elected MP, receiving 63.1% of the vote.

== Family ==
Grant's mother, Wendy Grant-John (Hunʼqumiʼnum: taχʷtəna:t), and his maternal grandfather, Willard Sparrow (Hunʼqumiʼnum: θəliχʷəltən), both served as chiefs of the Musqueam Indian Band. His father is Howard Grant (洪文興), an executive director with the First Nations Summit. His paternal grandparents were Hong Tim Hing (洪添慶), a Chinese immigrant who came to Canada in 1920, and Agnes Grant, a Musqueam woman.

Current Musqueam chief Wayne Sparrow (Hunʼqumiʼnum: yəχʷyaχʷələq) and elder Larry Grant (Hunʼqumiʼnum: sʔəyəɬəq) are Grant's uncles.

Grant has two children. Eli and Isla Grant.

== Electoral record ==
=== Federal ===
2025 Canadian federal election: Vancouver Quadra
Party	Candidate	Votes	%	±%	Expenditures
Liberal	Wade Grant	35,384	63.19	+19.80	$97,232.30
Conservative	Ken Charko	17,008	30.37	+1.15	$111,444.13
New Democratic	Alim Fakirani	2,391	4.27	–15.12	$12,680.64
Green	Tom Digby	1,032	1.84	–4.12	$5,660.00
People's	John Odan Ede	182	0.33	–1.71	$2,304.34
Total valid votes/expense limit		55,997	99.28	–	$128,292.43
Total rejected ballots		407	0.72	+0.12	
Turnout		56,404	68.82	+6.17	
Eligible voters		81,957			
Liberal notional hold		Swing		+9.33	
Source: Elections Canada
