= Michael Posluns =

Canadian journalist and researcher (1941–2020)

- Born: 1941; Canada
- Died: January 10, 2020 (aged 78–79)
- Education: York University
- Occupations: Journalist, researcher, advocate

Michael Posluns (1941 - January 10, 2020) was a notable Canadian journalist and researcher. While studying at Carleton University, Posluns became involved with social justice causes and joined the Company of Young Canadians. He went to Akwesasne where he worked with Rarihokwats and Ernie Benedict, helping to publish Akewsasne Notes, a local newspaper that ran from 1969-1996. He also became a self-trained court worker, assisting locals to navigate the legal system.

In the mid-1970s, he served as a parliamentary adviser to the National Indian Brotherhood (known today as the Assembly of First Nations), working with George Manuel. He also worked with the Dene Nation and others on governance, land claims, mercury poisoning and other issues. Posluns completed a PhD at York University in 2002 and his dissertation is titled The Public Emergence of the Vocabulary of First Nations Self-Government.

He was the author of numerous other articles and books and he was co-author with George Manuel of 'The Fourth World: An Indian Reality' (1974) and with David Nahwegahbow and Douglas Sanders of 'The First Nations and the Crown: A Study in Trust Relationships' (1983). Posluns was an important figure in raising the profile of indigenous rights in Canada. He worked closely with George Manuel to advance self-government and indigenous political rights and their work had significant impact on the work of future political actors. In speaking to The Globe and Mail in 2013 Posluns cited some of his early advocacy work in the 1970s involved changing the language the government used to refer to indigenous peoples. For example members of Canadian parliament would refer to activist Kahnitenata Horn as a "Mohawk princess," demonstrating an ignorance of the democratic governance structures of the Haudenosaunee Confederacy. Posluns continued to advocate on issues related to governance and challenging myths and problematic language related to indigenous peoples of Canada, writing opinion columns and policy statements up to 2013. He retired from this work in 2014 due to illness. He died on January 10, 2020.

== Works ==
- Manuel, George; Posluns, Michael (2019) The fourth world: an Indian reality. Minneapolis: University of Minnesota Press, 2019. ISBN 9781517906061.
- Posluns, Michael W. (2011-10-27). "Aboriginal Land Claims: The Alice in Wonderland Dimension of the Canadian Judicial System". Slaw.
- Posluns, Michael; Bruce W. Hodgins; S. L. Osborne; TotalBoox; TBX (2014). The Dundurn Arctic Culture and Sovereignty Library. Dundurn. ISBN 9781459729568.
- Posluns, Michael (2013-09-18). "Did the National Apologies to Aboriginal People Grant Absolution to the Government?". Slaw: Canada's online legal magazine.
- Posluns, Michael W (2010). Speaking with authority: the emergence of the vocabulary of first nations' self-government. Place of publication not identified: Routledge. ISBN 978-0-415-88261-3.
- Posluns, Michael (2007-07-23). "Congress of Aboriginal Peoples". The Canadian Encyclopedia.
- Posluns, Michael; Marshall, Tabitha; Hall, Anthony J. (2006-02-07). "Assembly of First Nations". The Canadian Encyclopedia.
- Posluns, Michael (1993). Voices from the Odeyak. Toronto: NC Press. ISBN 9781550210705.
- Posluns, Michael (1984). "Book Review: Marching to the Beat of the Same Drum: Transportation of Petroleum and Natural Gas North of 60°". Arctic. 37 (3): 310–311. doi:10.14430/arctic2446. ISSN 0004-0843.
- Posluns, Michael; Western Constitutional Forum; Northwest Territories; Legislative Assembly; Special Committee on Constitutional Development (1983). Constitutional development & the protection of Aboriginal rights. Yellowknife: Northwest Territories Legislative Assembly, Special Committee on Constitutional Development.
- Manuel, George; Posluns, Michael (1974). The fourth world: an Indian reality. New York: Free Press. ISBN 9780029756607. OCLC 301706816.
