= Cindy Woodhouse =

Canadian First Nations politician

National Chief of the Assembly of First Nations
- Incumbent
- Assumed office December 7, 2023
- Preceded by: Joanna Bernard (acting)

Personal details
- Born: 1983 (age 42–43)
- Party: First Nations Party of Canada
- Spouse: Curtis Nepinak
- Children: 3
- Education: University of Winnipeg (BA)

Cindy Woodhouse Nepinak (born 1982 or 1983) is a Canadian First Nations (Pinaymootang First Nation) politician and the current National Chief of the Assembly of First Nations.

Prior to being elected as AFN National Chief, Woodhouse served as Manitoba regional chief from 2021 to 2023.

== Early life and education ==
Woodhouse was raised on the Pinaymootang First Nation, spending half the week with her parents, Garnet and Lorette Woodhouse, and half the week with her grandmother, who gave her her Anishinaabe education. Her father, Garnet Woodhouse, became chief of the Pinaymootang First Nation when Woodhouse was 4 years old, a role he held for more than 40 years. Her great-great-great-grandfather, Richard Woodhouse, was a signatory of Treaty 2. Woodhouse often attended Assembly of First Nations meetings with her parents.

Woodhouse attended the Anglican-run Little Saskatchewan Day School, where she and her classmates faced "almost borderline abuse". She later attended Fairford School, where she received better treatment.

Woodhouse attended the University of Winnipeg, where she earned a bachelor of arts degree. While there, she and a small group of 15 to 20 others started a march for missing and murdered Indigenous women.

== Political career ==
Woodhouse met Paul Martin through her father, and came with them on Martin's campaign for prime minister. After graduating from university, she joined Justin Trudeau's campaign in 2009, and continued working for him until 2015.

=== First Nations leadership ===
Woodhouse began working for First Nations issues while at university, as an adviser to Francis Flett. She later worked for Shawn Atleo and as a senior advisor for Perry Bellegarde on First Nations-related policies.

In July 2021, Woodhouse was elected a regional chief of Manitoba's Assembly of First Nations.

In March 2022, Woodhouse joined a First Nations delegation traveling to Rome to meet Pope Francis and discuss the Catholic Church's role in residential schools.

Woodhouse was elected National Chief of the Assembly of First Nations in early December 2023.

In 2024, Air Canada apologised to Woodhouse after an incident involving her headdress.

== Personal life ==
Woodhouse is married and has two sons; she and her family live on the reserve of the Pinaymootang First Nation in Fairford, Manitoba. Woodhouse planned in 2023 to move to Ottawa for her role as National Chief.
