= Sheila North =

Cree leader and journalist

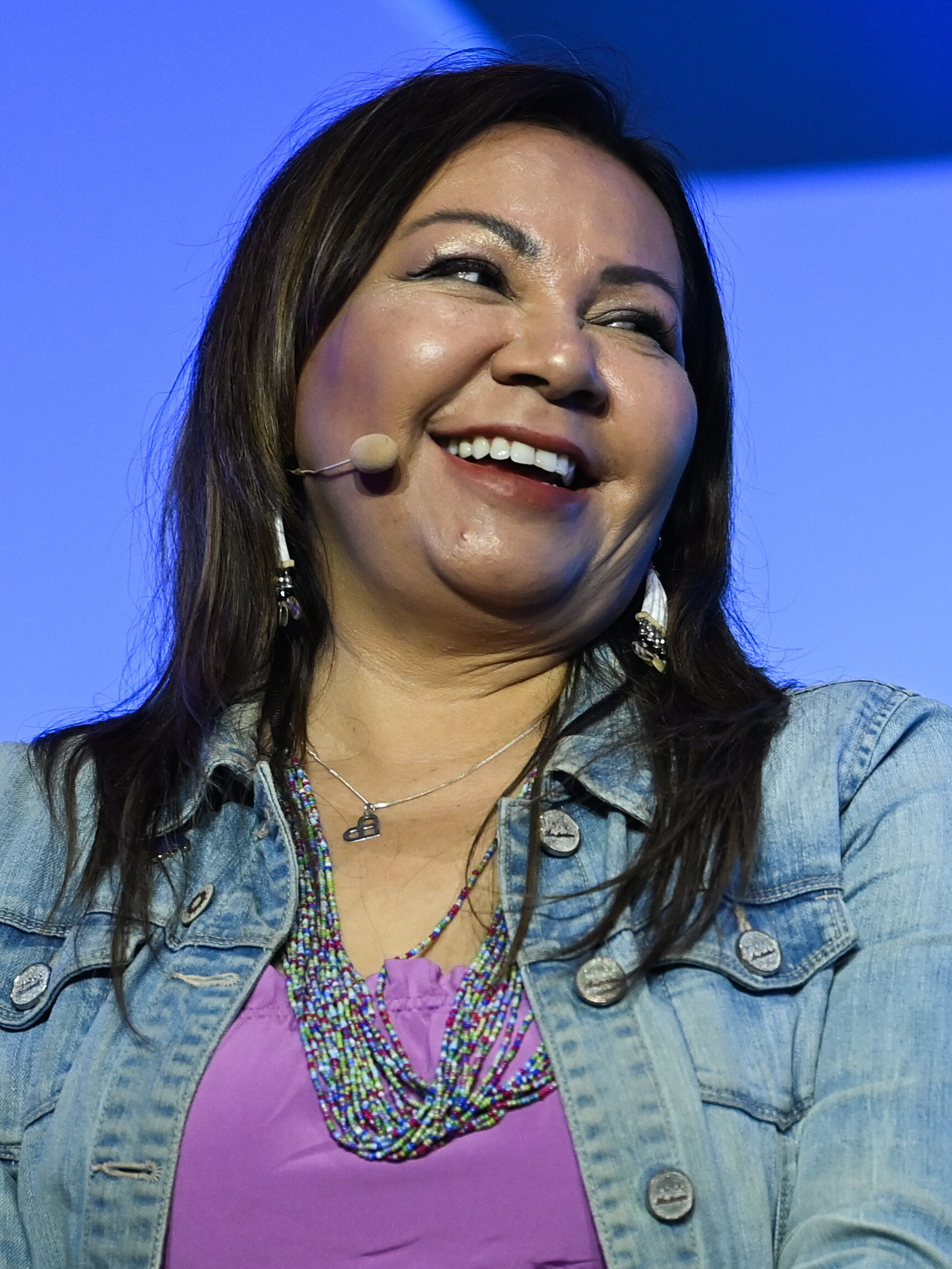
North in 2022

Sheila North is a Cree leader and journalist, who formerly served as Grand Chief of Manitoba Keewatinowi Okimakanak.

North is originally from Bunibonibee Cree Nation in Northern Manitoba. As a teenager, she moved to Winnipeg to attend Daniel McIntyre Collegiate Institute, before graduating from Red River College in 2006 with a degree in communications. She then worked as a journalist for CBC News and CTV News. She was nominated for a Gemini Award in 2010. In 2012, she helped coin the hashtag #MMIW, for missing and murdered indigenous women, while working for the Assembly of Manitoba Chiefs. She was involved in English-to-Cree translation for the 2012 documentary We Were Children.

In 2015, she became Grand Chief of Manitoba Keewatinowi Okimakanak, the first woman to hold the position. She was named one of Chatelaine’s top 30 women of 2015. In November 2016, she appealed to federal Prime Minister Justin Trudeau to accept an invitation to visit Shamattawa First Nation after a fire destroyed the only grocery store in the nation. In 2017, she addressed the federal parliament's Indigenous and Northern Affairs Committee over the country's failure to compensate First Nations for hydropower development, as was agreed in the Northern Flood Agreement.

After her term ended, she contested the 2018 Assembly of First Nations leadership election, finishing as runner up to incumbent Perry Bellegarde with 23,9% of the second ballot vote.

In 2021, she announced she would be running to lead the Assembly of Manitoba Chiefs, aiming to become the first woman in history to become AMC Grand Chief.
