= Pamela Palmater =

Mi'kmaq lawyer, professor, activist

- Pam Palmater speaking at an event on contested claims of indigeneity in Vermont.
- Born: 1970 (age 55–56); Eel River, New Brunswick, Canada
- Education: Dalhousie University
- Occupation: Professor
- Writing career
- Notable works: Beyond Blood: Rethinking Aboriginal Identity and Belonging.
- Website: pampalmater.com

Pamela Palmater (born 1970) is a Mi'kmaq social justice activist, lawyer, and academic from New Brunswick, Canada. She was noted as a leading voice in the 2013 Idle No More movement, and was cited heavily in the final report of the National Inquiry into Missing and Murdered Indigenous Women and Girls. Palmater is a professor in the Department of Politics and Public Administration at Toronto Metropolitan University (formerly Ryerson University). She is a frequent political and legal commentator, appearing on such network as Aboriginal Peoples Television Network's InFocus, CTV, and CBC.

== Early life ==
Palmater's family is from Eel River, New Brunswick. She is a member of the Eel River Bar First Nation. Pamela's parents decided to move the family to St. Mary's area in Frederiction in hopes of giving a better life for their children. After her parents parted ways, she lived for several years in the uptown area of Fredericton with her mother and her 2 sisters.

== Education ==
She graduated with a Bachelor of Arts from St. Thomas University in 1994 with a double major in Native Studies and History. She then graduated from the University of New Brunswick in 1997 with a Bachelor of Laws. In 1999, she graduated from Dalhousie University with a Master in Laws in Aboriginal Law. In 2009, Palmater obtained a Doctorate in Aboriginal Law from Dalhousie University Law School with her thesis entitled, "Beyond Blood: Rethinking Aboriginal Identity and Belonging".

== Career ==
Palmater is active in the Assembly of First Nations and is head of the Centre for Indigenous Governance at Toronto Metropolitan University, where she is a professor in the Department of Politics and Public Administration. She worked for the federal government for over ten years, and was a director at Indian and Northern Affairs managing portfolios responsible for First Nations treaties, land claims and self-government.

In 2012, Palmater was the runner up in the Assembly of First Nations leadership elections for national chief. Her social advocacy highlighting Indigenous issues and missing and murdered Indigenous women bestowed many awards throughout her career.

In 2021, Palmater began contributing to the online news website The Breach.

Palmater is the host of the Warrior Life podcast about Indigenous activism.

== Statements ==
In an interview for Co-op Media New Brunswick, Palmater stated "The Harper government has no respect for the law, the constitution, the charter, treaties or international law with respect to the duty and legal obligation to solve and accommodate the rights of indigenous peoples, and that’s clear."

A National Post article described Palmater as "the most prominent spokesperson for the 2013 Idle No More movement." The article notes "Palmater also figured heavily in the final report of the National Inquiry into Missing and Murdered Indigenous Women and Girls, and its controversial assertion that Canada is just as bent on genocide now as during the residential school era." It quotes from the 2019 report, where Palmater says “Today’s racist government laws, policies and actions have proven to be just as deadly for Indigenous peoples as the genocidal acts of the past.”

Discussing the Nova Scotia mass murder perpetrator, Palmater wrote there is "a real bias problem in mainstream media when it comes to white men who commit horrible crimes. It’s called “Exceptional White Male Syndrome.”

Speaking at a symposium at the University of Vermont in 2024, she said perpetrators of Indigenous identity fraud were "...literally a threat to our sovereignty, our nationhood/citizenship, our culture and political standing in the future,"

== Awards ==
2012 YWCA Toronto Woman of Distinction Award in Social Justice.

2012 Women's Courage Award in Social Justice.

2012 Bertha Wilson Honour Society (Inaugural Inductee).

2013 Top 25 Most Influential Lawyer: Top 5 in Human Rights.

2014 Canada's Top Visionary Women Leaders: Top 23.

2014 Building a Better World Designation: Nation-Builder.

2015 UNB Alumni Award of Distinction.

2016 Ryerson's Aboriginal Role Model.

2016 21 Inspirational First Nation, Metis, Inuit Women Leaders.

2016 J.S. Woodsworth Woman of Excellence Award in Human Rights and Equality.

2016 Margaret Mead Award in Social Justice.

2017 Doctor of Laws honoris causa.

2017 Award for Excellence in Human Rights.

== Publications ==
Warrior Life: Indigenous Resistance and Resurgence (Fernwood, 2020).

Indigenous nationhood: empowering grassroots citizens (Fernwood, 2015)

Stretched Beyond Human Limits: Death by Poverty in First Nations (for publication in 2012).

Beyond Blood: Rethinking Indigenous Identity and Belonging. (Saskatoon: Purich Publishing, 2011)

Our Children, Our Future, Our Vision: First Nation Jurisdiction over First Nation Education for the Chiefs of Ontario

In My Brother's Footsteps: Is R. v. Powley the Path to Recognized Aboriginal Identity for Non-Status Indians? in J. Magnet, D. Dorey, eds., Aboriginal Rights Litigation (Markham: LexisNexis, 2003) 149. Stretched Beyond Human Limits: Death by Poverty in First Nations (2012) 65/66 Canadian Review of Social Policy.
