= Noel Starblanket =

Canadian First Nations leader

- Kisikaw Piyesiwewin; Pahpahtaywak Kihew

Chief of the National Indian Brotherhood
- In office 1976–1980
- Preceded by: George Manuel
- Succeeded by: Delbert Riley

Personal details
- Born: September 26, 1946 Fort Qu'Appelle, Saskatchewan
- Died: April 15, 2019 (aged 72) Regina, Saskatchewan
- Children: 3

Noel Victor Starblanket (September 26, 1946 – April 15, 2019) was a Canadian politician. For two terms from 1976 to 1980 he was chief of the National Indian Brotherhood (today known as the Assembly of First Nations).

== Early years and education ==
Noel was born at Fort Qu'Appelle Indian Hospital in Fort Qu'Appelle, Saskatchewan on September 26, 1946. He was a Cree from the Starblanket Indian Reserve near Balcarres, Saskatchewan, in Treaty 4 territory.

Starblanket spent eleven years at Qu'Appelle Indian Residential School and was abused while there. Some of his memories are recorded in The Survivors Speak: a report of the Truth and Reconciliation Commission of Canada and the e-book Shattering the Silence. Additionally, Regina filmmaker Trudy Stewart produced a short documentary film, From Up North.

Starblanket attended law school at the University of Saskatchewan.

== Career ==
In 1971, at age 24, Starblanket became one of the youngest reserve chiefs in Canada. He was elected Third Vice-Chief of the Executive of the Federation of Saskatchewan Indians (FSIN) and Director of Treaty Rights and Research. In 1975, he was elected president of the National Indian Brotherhood and was re-elected in 1978.

As part of the "Indian Film Crew", an early effort in Indigenous filmmaking at the National Film Board of Canada (NFB), Starblanket was one of the filmmakers (with Mike Mitchell) on the 1969 documentary film, You Are on Indian Land, and worked on the Ballad of Crowfoot, among others. In 1973, the NFB released a 27-minute film, Starblanket. in which, starting at 19:25 he discusses his desire in to start a farm for reserve members (see SIAP, Federation of Sovereign Indigenous Nations).

Starblanket was asked to consider the position of Assistant Deputy Minister of Indian Affairs in 1980. He spoke at the economics conference at the World Assembly of First Nations when President of the National Indian Business Association (NIBA).

Starblanket, Morley Watson and Vern Bellegarde envisioned a Native hockey team and spurred the formation of the Lebret Eagles."

In March 2001 he gave the keynote speech at the annual conference of the Association of Death Education and Counseling. In 2001 he was interviewed for a project and the documentary, Starblanket: A Spirit Journey was later produced.

He speaks about the 1970/1969 Red Paper/White Paper events in the 2010 CBC radio program Ideas, titled Red Paper/White Paper and Part 2.

In 2018, Starblanket became Elder-in-residence at Scott Collegiate, a high school in Regina. He worked with the University of Regina's Office of Indigenization. Speaking January 13, 2019.

== Personal life and demise ==
Starblanket died at age 72 on April 15, 2019, at a hospital in Regina, Saskatchewan, from complications of diabetes.
