= The Key 65 =

Indian reserve in Saskatchewan, Canada

Coordinates: 51°45′38″N 102°08′13″W

- Indian reserve
- The Key Indian Reserve No. 65
- Location in Saskatchewan
- First Nation: The Key
- Country: Canada
- Province: Saskatchewan

Area
  - Total: 6,404.8 ha (15,827 acres)

Population (2016)
  - Total: 143
  - Density: 2.23/km^{2} (5.78/sq mi)
- Community Well-Being Index: 60

The Key 65 is an Indian reserve of The Key First Nation in Saskatchewan, Canada. It is about 26 kilometres (16 mi) north-west of Kamsack. In the 2016 Canadian Census, it recorded a population of 143 living in 46 of its 58 total private dwellings. In the same year, its Community Well-Being index was calculated at 60 of 100, compared to 58.4 for the average First Nations community and 77.5 for the average non-Indigenous community.

== See also ==
- List of Indian reserves in Saskatchewan
