= The Key First Nation =

First Nations band in Saskatchewan

- Band No. 368
- Treaty: Treaty 4
- Headquarters: Norquay
- Province: Saskatchewan

Land
- Other reserve: The Key 65
- Land area: 64.048 km^{2} (24.729 sq mi)

Population (2019)
- On reserve: 308
- Off reserve: 1099
- Total population: 1407

Government
- Chief: Dustin Brass
- Council: Kimberly Keshane Shannon Brass Jaycee Brass David Cote Rick Crane

Tribal Council
- Yorkton Tribal Administration

Website
- keyband.com

The Key First Nation (Ojibwe: Baakwaang) is a band government in southern Saskatchewan, Canada. Their reserves include:

- The Key 65
- Treaty Four Reserve Grounds 77, shared with 32 other bands.

== Chiefs ==
This First nation band, led by Chief Ow-tah-pee-ka-kaw (“He Who unlocks” or “The Key”, the namesake of the modern First Nation), signed Treaty 4 with the representatives of the Crown on September 24, 1875.

The Federation of Saskatchewan Indian Nations Chiefs Assembly honoured Gwendolyn Lucy O'Soup Crane for her lifetime achievements and recognized her as Canada's first female, First Nations Chief (of The Key First Nation), and the first elected under the current electoral system.
