= Wendy Grant-John =

First Nations leader in British Columbia

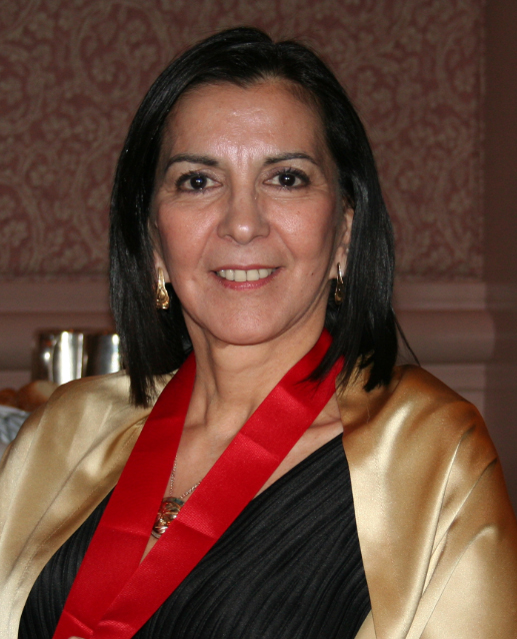
- Grant-John in 2011

Chief of the Musqueam First Nation

Vice-Chief of the Assembly of First Nations

Personal details
- Born: Wendy Sparrow
- Spouse: Edward John
- Children: 4
- Relatives: Willard Sparrow (father), Gail, Debra, and Robyn Sparrow (sisters)
- Awards: Indspire Award (2006), YWCA Woman of Distinction (2001), Honorary Doctorates from Royal Roads University (2003) and Simon Fraser University (2011)

Wendy Grant-John, née Wendy Sparrow, is a prominent First Nations leader in British Columbia. She served three terms as chief of the Musqueam First Nation and was the first woman elected regional vice-chief of the Assembly of First Nations.

== Early life and education ==
She is the daughter of former Musqueam chief Willard Sparrow and sister of Gail Sparrow. Grant-John also has two other sisters named Debra and Robyn Sparrow who are Indigenous weavers.

== Career ==
In 1997 Grant-John came in second to Phil Fontaine in the election for National Chief of the Assembly of First Nations. That year, she also enrolled in the University of Northern British Columbia. From 1997 until 2000 she served as Associate Regional Director-General of the Department of Indian and Northern Affairs for British Columbia. She was the first woman elected Regional Chief to the Assembly of First Nations.

Grant-John has been involved in the development and operation of several businesses. As Musqueam chief, she helped to create the first aboriginal commercial fishery in Canada and was a founder of Musqueam Weavers, a company that revitalized the local tradition of weaving. She was also a founding member and director of the Aboriginal Healing Commission in 1998.

Grant-John has served as a lay bencher of the Law Society of British Columbia and as a Commissioner of the Pacific Salmon Commission. As well, in 2006, she was appointed the Minister of Indian Affairs and named Assembly of First Nations Commission Co-chair. In 2011, she joined the National Aboriginal Client Services Practice.

In 2017, Grant-John was one of five people appointed by the Liberal government to come up with recommendations to reform the National Energy Board. Two years later, she was appointed a member of Vancouver Police Board.

== Awards ==
Grant-John received the YWCA Woman of Distinction Award for Social Action in 2001, an honorary Doctor of Laws from Royal Roads University in 2003, and a National Aboriginal Achievement Award, now the Indspire Awards, for Community Development in 2006. In the fall of 2011 she received another honorary doctorate from Simon Fraser University.

== Personal life ==
Grant-John is married to Edward John and has four children from her previous marriage to Howard Grant.

== Bibliography ==
- Indian Affairs bio
