= RoseAnne Archibald =

Canadian First Nations advocate

National Chief of the Assembly of First Nations
- In office July 8, 2021 – June 28, 2023
- Preceded by: Perry Bellegarde
- Succeeded by: Joanna Bernard (interim)

Personal details
- Born: 1966 or 1967 (age 58–59)
- Education: Laurentian University

RoseAnne Archibald is a Canadian First Nations advocate and politician who served as the National Chief of the Assembly of First Nations (AFN) from July 2021 to June 2023. She made history as the first female National Chief of the Assembly of First Nations. However, her tenure ended in June 2023 when she was ousted following a third-party investigation into her leadership. Consequently, she became the first AFN national chief to be voted out of office.

Archibald was first elected as the chief of the Taykwa Tagamou Nation in 1990, being the first woman and the youngest chief to be elected, at the age of 23. She was the first woman and youngest Nishnawbe Aski Nation Deputy Grand Chief in 1991, and the first woman and youngest Grand Chief of the Mushkegowuk Council in 1994. She became the first woman elected as Ontario Regional Chief in 2018. During this tenure, Archibald was the subject of an independent probe after AFN staff accused her of bullying and harassment. While the AFN deemed the allegations credible, Archibald maintains the probe was reprisal. On July 8, 2021, Archibald won the National Chief of the Assembly of First Nations election on the second day of voting, after Reginald Bellerose, who was in second place, conceded.

Archibald was suspended as National Chief on June 17, 2022 over bullying and harassment allegations. The suspension came after she released a statement labelling the allegations a "smear campaign" and calling for an investigation into the AFN's conduct. She was reinstated on July 5, 2022, after a resolution to uphold her suspension was defeated at the AFN General Assembly. Third party investigators subsequently concluded Archibald breached the AFN's harassment policy, whistleblower policy and code of conduct. As a result, on June 28, 2023, AFN members voted 71 per cent in favour to remove her as national chief, effective immediately. On July 10, Joanna Bernard of Madawaska First Nation was appointed as interim national chief until a special chiefs' assembly is held in December.

Archibald was succeeded by AFN Manitoba Regional Chief Cindy Woodhouse, who was elected national chief in December 2023.

== Awards and recognition ==
- Toronto Star 20 Ontario Vaccine Heroes
- Maclean's Magazine Power List: 50 Canadians shaping how we think and live
- The Hill Times 100 most influential people to watch in federal politics
