= Gwendolyn Lucy O'Soup Crane =

Gwendolyn Lucy O'Soup Crane (1930–2005) was Canada's first female First Nations Chief, and first elected.

She was born on August 12, 1930, in The Key First Nation, Saskatchewan, and died on August 10, 2005, in Regina, Saskatchewan.

== Indigenous Peoples History ==
The Truth and Reconciliation Commission 94 Calls to Action are dependent on identifying and making publicly available the history and legacy of residential schools and the history of Indigenous Peoples in Canada. There is a lack of documentation for their history as it was one of forced assimilation by a dominant culture looking to erase those cultures, which means little may be available. Plus digitization efforts to date have not prioritized items under copyright nor non-mainstream cultures and languages, resulting in claims of digital or electronic colonialism. Thus the paucity of information and references for this notable Indigenous person who was publicly honoured by an Indigenous organization (FSIN) for her lifetime achievements.

== Early years ==
She was born Gwendolyn Lucy O'Soup in 1930. Her brothers and sisters include Raymond Brass, Frances Crowfoot, and Geraldine Wardman.

== Personal life ==
She married Clifford Crane of the Key First Nation after his service in World War II and raised nine children, Terry, Dennis (residential school specialist and later, Chief), Garda, Gilda, Trent, Brenda, Joy, Karen, and Cliff. Norman predeceased his parents in 1956 at just over 2 years of age.

She lived in Moose Jaw (1961–67) and Edmonton (1967-84) with most of her children before returning to the reserve to retire.

Gwen Crane was a lifetime member of the Anglican Church and sat on the national Anglican Council for Indigenous People (ACIP). "She spent the last few years trying to convince the province and the federal government to recognize the old St. Andrew's Anglican Church, which was built by members on the reserve in 1885, as a historical monument."

Kookum ["grandmother"] to Corey O'Soup, the first Advocate for Children and Youth for the province of Saskatchewan with Indigenous heritage.

== Career ==
At the age of 24 she was nominated for the position of Chief and won by three votes in December 1954, becoming Canada's first female, First Nations Chief and first elected under the current electoral system. There are reputed to be other female Chiefs pre-contact but the colonial, male dominated culture refused to deal with women, and thus the decline in balanced leadership until her win. Political service was limited to a two-year term at the time, which she fulfilled (1954–56). Her mandate was Indigenous education and revitalizing a health care centre (Union Hospital) in Norquay, and that "our main thrust is to get the Indians working together in harmony." She was a seamstress in a clothing factory in Moose Jaw. She was also the first woman porter at the Royal Alexandra Hospital in Edmonton. She is reported to have also cleaned buses and did housecleaning while living in Edmonton.

== Awards ==
Honoured by the Federation of Saskatchewan Indian Nations Chiefs Assembly for her lifetime achievements.
