= Walter Deiter =

Canadian First Nations leader (1916–1988)

Chief of the National Indian Brotherhood
- In office 1968–1970
- Preceded by: first leader
- Succeeded by: George Manuel

Personal details
- Born: 31 May 1916 Saskatchewan
- Died: 7 September 1988 (aged 72) Regina, Saskatchewan

Walter Perry Deiter OC (31 May 1916 – 7 September 1988) was a Canadian First Nations leader. He was the founding chief of the National Indian Brotherhood in 1968, which is today known as the Assembly of First Nations.

== Early years ==
Deiter was born on the Peepeekisis Reserve near Balcarres, Saskatchewan. His father was Cree and his mother was Saulteaux. He attended residential schools at File Hills in Saskatchewan and later in Brandon, Manitoba, where he completed up to Grade 10.

Deiter volunteered to fight in 1939, enlisting with the Regina Regiment, and completed basic training. Before he could be deployed, he was diagnosed with tuberculosis and was sent to Fort San Hospital, where he spent the next four years, where he completed his Grade 12 and earned a certificate in business administration.

== Personal life ==
Deiter married Inez Wuttunee of Red Pheasant Cree Nation in 1951.

== Career ==
In 1958, Deiter and his wife Inez were "the driving force in laying down the foundations for the inauguration of the Saskatoon Friendship Centre." After relocating to Regina, Deiter served as the first Indigenous president of the Regina Indian and Métis Friendship Centre from 1962 to 1967. In 1966, he became head of the Federation of Saskatchewan Indian Nations and served in that role until 1968. During this time, he negotiated with then Premier Ross Thatcher, for a five percent hiring policy of First Nations and Métis people within the provincial government. He was also heavily involved in developing the first plans for a native-controlled Native Metal Industries Ltd, which was still in operation in 1980. With his staff, Deiter helped organize the Indian Association of Alberta and the Manitoba Indian Brotherhood.

Deiter was instrumental in the founding of the National Indian Brotherhood in Canada and was its first president, serving from 1968 to 1970. Deiter had a relatively conservative approach to issues around indigenous self-government, education and community development. He was replaced by George Manuel in 1970.

In 1970, Deiter formed the Native Alcohol Council (he had been a member of Alcoholics Anonymous since 1956). Deiter was elected as band councillor of Peepeekisis First nation in 1977. He also served as a consultant for the Federation of Saskatchewan Indians (FSI) in 1978. In 1978 he helped organize the National Indian Veterans Association in order to lobby the federal government for equal treatment for Indigenous military veterans. In 1980, he also served as the Southern President of the Saskatchewan Indian Veterans' Association. in 1979 Deiter was one of five leaders who made a presentation to British Parliament about the concerns of Indigenous Peoples in Canada regarding the new Constitution.

Deiter was appointed as an Officer of the Order of Canada in recognition of his work towards better education and social conditions for First Nations people.

He died of cancer in Regina and was buried on the Okanese Reserve.
