= George Manuel =

Canadian First Nations chief

President of the National Indian Brotherhood
- In office 1970–1976
- Preceded by: Walter Dieter
- Succeeded by: Noel Starblanket

Personal details
- Born: February 21, 1921 British Columbia, Canada
- Died: November 15, 1989 (aged 68) Kamloops, British Columbia, Canada

George Manuel, OC (February 21, 1921 – November 15, 1989) was a leader in the Indigenous rights movement locally, provincially (especially with First Nations in British Columbia), nationally (with First Nations in Canada), and globally.

Born and raised in British Columbia, he became politically active there and in Alberta. In 1970, he was elected and served until 1976 as chief of the National Indian Brotherhood (known today as the Assembly of First Nations). In 1975 he founded and became president of the World Council of Indigenous Peoples, serving until 1981.

Reflecting on his work with Indigenous peoples of the Americas, he wrote The Fourth World: An Indian Reality (1975), exploring the effects of waves of European immigration on these peoples. In his later years, he served as president of the Union of British Columbia Indian Chiefs, 1979 through 1981.

== Life ==
Manuel was born to Maria and Rainbow in 1921, on Secwépemc territory in British Columbia. Maria later married Louie Manuel, and George took his stepfather's last name. He was first educated at the Kamloops Indian Residential School.

After contracting tuberculosis (which had no effective antibiotic treatment at the time), he was transferred to an Indian hospital on an Indian reserve near Chilliwack, British Columbia. There Manuel met Marceline Paul (Kutenai) from St. Mary's Indian Band. They later married and had six children together.

His sons Robert and Arthur Manuel (enrolled Secwépemc) also became active in Indigenous politics. His eldest daughter Vera Manuel became a playwright and poet as well as a respected leader in the community. His younger daughter Doreen Manuel is a filmmaker.

== Political career ==
Manuel became involved in Indigenous politics and his increasing responsibilities strained his marriage. He was elected chief of the Neskonlith Indian Band. In 1959, following the death of his mentor Andy Paull, Manuel was elected head of the North American Indian Brotherhood. Soon after, he and Marceline Paul separated.

Not long after this, the federal Department of Indian Affairs hired Manuel for a position with the Cowichan Tribes government at Duncan. Manuel worked as a Community Development Officer. In addition to assisting the tribe, he also worked to increase wider awareness in the government and society of the problems and conditions faced by the Cowichan people.

Manuel next worked for the Alberta Brotherhood, which represented Indigenous peoples in the province. There he developed a strong working relationship with Cree political leader Harold Cardinal. In this position, Manuel met and worked extensively with chiefs across Canada, becoming familiar with a wide range of issues.

Cardinal encouraged Manuel to run for national chief of the newly created National Indian Brotherhood, a body that would represent "status Indians" in Canada. Walter Deiter served as the first president from 1968 to 1970. Manuel served as national chief from 1970 to 1976.

In 1975 Manuel helped found and was elected as the president of the World Council of Indigenous Peoples, serving in this position until 1981.

He had begun to think deeply about the effects of successive waves of European expansion on Indigenous societies in the Americas, and considered these native peoples together as the "Fourth World," with numerous experiences in common in terms of having to adapt to colonisation and its aftermath. Manuel wrote a book, The Fourth World: An Indian Reality, expanding on this idea, co-written with Michael Posluns; it was published in 1975. In the book, Manuel argued that the history of all settler colonial expansion comes from two different ideas of land : land as a commodity and land as a relationship. Indigenous peoples' struggle to defend the latter against the violent globalization of the former is at its core the struggle of what Manuel calls the "Fourth World."

George Manuel was president of the Union of British Columbia Indian Chiefs (UBCIC) from 1979 to 1981. He developed the Aboriginal Rights Position Paper and organized what came to be regarded as one of the UBCIC's most ambitious projects: the Indian Constitutional Express. Under his leadership, the UBCIC gained stature both with Indigenous people and the general public.

In 1984, Manuel and Rudolph C. Ryser formed the Center for World Indigenous Studies.

== Legacy and honours ==
Manuel was made an Officer of the Order of Canada. He was also repeatedly recognized for his international work by the World Council of Indigenous Peoples. In 1983 he received an honorary degree from the University of British Columbia, Vancouver.

In 1993, the George Manuel Institute was established by the Neskonlith Indian Band, offering an adult education program, a business administration program, a university and college entrance program, and a high school.

In 2023, Canada Post announced that Manuel would be one of three people, alongside Nellie Cournoyea and Thelma Chalifoux, honoured as Indigenous pioneers on new postage stamps.
