= Georges Erasmus =

Canadian politician

National Chief of the Assembly of First Nations
- In office 1985–1991
- Preceded by: David Ahenakew
- Succeeded by: Ovide Mercredi

Personal details
- Born: Georges Henry Erasmus; August 8, 1948 (age 77) Behchoko, Northwest Territories, Canada

Georges Henry Erasmus, OC (born August 8, 1948) is a Canadian politician. He was the national chief of the Assembly of First Nations from 1985 to 1991.

Erasmus was born in a Dene community of the Northwest Territories to a family of 12 children. He attended high school in Yellowknife. In 1967, he was a volunteer with the Company of Young Canadians.

He became president of the Dene Nation in 1974 and while president fought against the proposed Mackenzie Valley Pipeline.

He was the federal New Democratic Party candidate in 1979 for Western Arctic riding.

Erasmus was national chief of the Assembly of First Nations during the Oka Crisis. After serving two terms as national chief he co-chaired the Royal Commission on Aboriginal Peoples.

Erasmus has been honoured for his work many times. He was appointed to the Order of Canada as a member in 1987, and was promoted to officer in 1999. He has also been awarded honorary doctorates by seven Canadian universities, including the University of Toronto, Queen's University, and the University of Manitoba. He was awarded an honorary doctorate by the University of Western Ontario in June 2006. In 2009 he was awarded the Governor General's Northern Medal.

== Intellectual Contribution to Indigenous Rights ==
Georges Erasmus is a committed advocate, political leader, and well-respected spokesperson for Indigenous peoples in Canada. In 1976, Erasmus presented to the Berger Inquiry the Dene's position to the proposed pipeline. This presentation, "We the Dene" gives some initial insight into the intellectual thinking of Erasmus. However, it is important to stress that Erasmus speaks from his location as a member of the Dene and his intellectual thoughts would be influenced by his relationships with his elders and his position within his community. Speaking as one of the Dene, Erasmus outlined the Dene's assertion of sovereignty.

As a distinct Dene nation, Erasmus pointed out that they sought to enter into the confederation of Canada as a "recognized entity" with their own self-government over a specific land base. Erasmus points out in this presentation that the Treaties 8 and 11 were agreements entered into on the understanding that they recognized the right of the Dene to govern themselves and from which the Dene nation could live separately but in peaceful coexistence with the non Dene people. Erasmus states, "Clearly these agreements have been broken. Instead of recognition of our national right to self-determination, we have been subjected to over fifty years of colonization, of forced assimilation." In representing his people on the public stage, Erasmus has pursued the need for negotiation, new agreements, and recognition of Indigenous rights from the Canadian government. At times his frustration towards a noncommittal federal government has shown, and he has had to forewarn the government of potential conflict.

At an early point in his intellectual and political life, Erasmus began to highlight the importance of de-colonization and how this must be based on collective action. In taking this approach he attempted to highlight the collective capacity of resistance, and challenged the power relations embedded within the language and practice of paternalism, asserting his people's right to define themselves, and their own needs. Beginning with the Dene declaration, the model of nations coexisting together in an ethical relationship while retaining sovereignty, is highlighted as a central tenet of his people's position. This was carried on throughout his public interviews and is presented in the Royal Commission on Aboriginal Peoples.

In a speech given by Erasmus in 2002, he continued to call for conversation "nation to nation," as the means upon which to build a "common future". Importantly, Erasmus proposed that the contemporary focus should move from an emphasis on "Aboriginal Rights to relationship between peoples; from crying needs to vigorous capacity; from individual citizenship to nations within the nation state." He suggests that the pursuit of seeking recognition of Aboriginal Rights through the Canadian courts should change because "Litigation is no way to build a community." Erasmus reasserts instead, the importance of treaty making as a way forward to build renewed relationships built on "mutual trust" and a bond "like that of brothers who might have different gifts and follow different paths, but who could be counted on to render assistance to one another in times of need."

== Electoral history ==
1979 Canadian federal election: Western Arctic
Party	Candidate	Votes	%	±%
Progressive Conservative	Dave Nickerson	4,058	35.16	–
Liberal	David Searle	3,827	33.15	–
New Democratic	Georges Erasmus	3,385	29.33	–
Independent	Edward McRae	273	2.37	–
Total valid votes		11,543	99.30	
Total rejected ballots		81	0.70	–
Turnout		11,624	72.10	–
Eligible voters		16,123		
Progressive Conservative notional gain		Swing		N/A
Riding created from part of the former riding of Northwest Territories, with New Democrat Wally Firth as the incumbent.
Source: Elections Canada
