= Perry Bellegarde =

Canadian First Nations advocate and politician

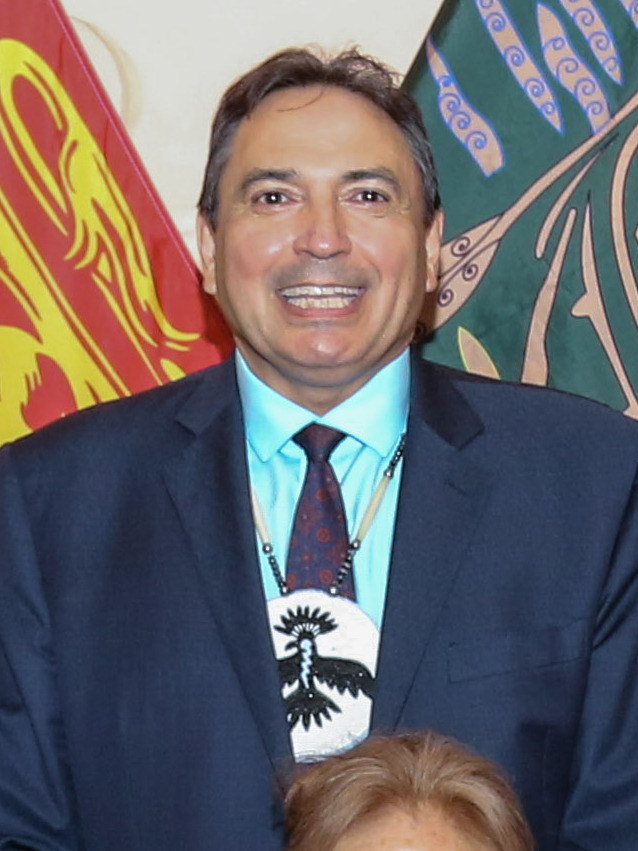
- Bellegarde in 2019

National Chief of the Assembly of First Nations
- In office December 10, 2014 – July 8, 2021
- Preceded by: Ghislain Picard (interim)
- Succeeded by: RoseAnne Archibald

Personal details
- Born: August 29, 1962 (age 64) Fort Qu'Appelle, Saskatchewan
- Spouse: Valerie Galley Bellegarde
- Education: Saskatchewan Federated Indian College, University of Regina
- Alma mater: University of Regina

Perry Bellegarde SOM (born August 29, 1962; Little Black Bear First Nation) is a Canadian First Nations advocate and politician who served as National Chief of the Assembly of First Nations from December 10, 2014, to July 8, 2021. He had previously served as chief of the Little Black Bear First Nation, chief of the Federation of Saskatchewan Indian Nations, and as the Saskatchewan regional chief of the Assembly of First Nations.

== Background ==
Born in 1962 at the Fort Qu'Appelle Indian Hospital in Fort Qu'Appelle, Saskatchewan, to Charles Bellegarde and Mary Yvonne Bellerose, Perry Bellegarde was raised on the Little Black Bear Indian reserve. He attended elementary and secondary schools in the nearby towns of Goodeve and Balcarres. After high school he attended the Saskatchewan Federated Indian College (now the First Nations University of Canada). Later he studied business administration at the University of Regina.

Following graduation, he worked as director of personnel for the Indian Institute of Technologies.

== Political career ==
In 1986 Bellegarde became active in tribal politics, and was elected to the Touchwood–File Hills–Qu’Appelle Tribal Council. In 1988 he was elected to the Presidency of that council, and he began an initiative to transfer management of the government's Fort Qu’Appelle Indian Hospital to First Nations control. In addition, he initiated and implemented the establishment of a new urban service delivery centre for First Nations people in the city of Regina.

Bellegarde has been recognized numerous times for his work as a First Nations leader. He has been awarded the Canada 125 Medal, the Saskatchewan Centennial Medal, and the Queen's Golden and Diamond Jubilee Medals. In 2018, the province of Saskatchewan honored Bellegarde with the Saskatchewan Order of Merit (SOM).

== Federation of Saskatchewan Indian Nations ==
In May 1998, Bellegarde became Chief of the province-wide Federation of Saskatchewan Indian Nations. In this role, he was automatically a regional vice-chair from Saskatchewan in the Assembly of First Nations (AFN). He served in this role until 2003.

Later he was reelected to another term in the position in 2012. In this role, he endorsed Neil Young's Honour the Treaties fundraising concert tour in 2014, which raised funds for the Athabasca Chipewyan First Nation's legal fight against exploitation of the Athabasca oil sands.

== AFN leadership ==
Given his experience, Bellegarde was a strong candidate for National Chief in the AFN's 2009 leadership election. On the eighth ballot, he was defeated by Shawn Atleo (Ahousaht First Nation); for six ballots the two candidates were virtually tied. He did not run in the 2012 election, in which Atleo won a second term.

After Atleo resigned in 2014, an election was held that year Bellegarde ran in the 2014 election. He won on the first ballot. He identified as an early priority to seek federal government support for a judicial inquiry into the high rate of missing and murdered aboriginal women, an issue that had dominated First Nations activism in the 2010s. He contributed to the newly elected Liberal government's establishing the Murdered and Missing Indigenous Women Inquiry on 3 August 2018.

In June 2017, Bellegarde marched in the Toronto Pride Parade. He was the first AFN National Chief to do so. Prime Minister Justin Trudeau also marched in this event.

On July 25, 2018, Bellegarde was re-elected to a second term as National Chief in the Assembly of First Nations' 2018 leadership election. He called for Indigenous nations to enact their own citizenship laws beyond the Indian Act. During the election campaign, he was criticised by other candidates for being too close to Canadian Prime Minister Justin Trudeau.

In 2019, Bellegarde signed an agreement with the Canadian government that led to passage of Bill C-92: An Act respecting First Nations, Inuit and Métis children, youth and families. The First Nations and other indigenous peoples believed that their children were too frequently removed by social welfare authorities from tribal communities, and placed with foster families outside indigenous societies, resulting in their becoming alienated from their families, clans and cultures. The bill transferred jurisdiction over child welfare from the federal government to Indigenous governments. Bellegarde also noted the need to negotiate with provincial governments over the bill, because several provinces were reluctant to cede their jurisdiction to Indigenous governments.

During the 2020 Canadian pipeline and railway protests, he spoke in favour of the protesters, saying that "people should never be criminalized for standing up for their lands." He promoted de-escalation of the crisis but was criticised for having been too quiet on the issue.

In March 2020, he along with the Inuit Tapiriit Kanatami and Métis National Council leaders met with the federal prime minister and the provincial premiers to lobby for the implementation of the UN Declaration on the Rights of Indigenous Peoples into Canadian law.

On the 24th of March 2020, the Assembly of First Nations declared a state of emergency over the severe risk faced by Indigenous communities due to the COVID-19 pandemic in Canada. Bellegrade further called for direct Indigenous involvement in emergency planning for the pandemic.

In June 2020, he called for an overhaul of policing in Canada, including shifting towards community-based policing, zero-tolerance policies for excessive force, and increased civilian oversight, after a series of police killings of Indigenous people.

On December 7, 2020, he announced he would not seek re-election to focus on completing important work, such as the passage of Bill C-15, before the end of his in July 2021.

== Honours ==
Perry Bellegarde received an Honorary Doctorate in Laws on June 2, 2022, from Lakehead University, Ontario, Canada.
