= Arthur Manuel =

Canadian political leader

Arthur Manuel (1951 – January 11, 2017) was a First Nations political leader in Canada. The son of Marceline Paul of the Ktunaxa Nation and political leader George Manuel of the Secwepemc Nation, he grew up on the Neskonlith Reserve in the interior of British Columbia. He attended the Kamloops (Kamloops, BC), St Eugene's (Cranbrook, BC) and St. Mary's (Mission, BC) residential schools, Concordia University (Montreal, Quebec) and Osgoode Hall Law School (Toronto, Ontario). He had five children.

== Early life ==
The son of George Manuel, who served as president of the National Indian Brotherhood and of the World Council of Indigenous Peoples in the 1970s, Arthur was born into the struggle along with other activist family members. In the 1970s, he served as president of the national Native Youth Association.

== Work and activism ==
Manuel attended but did not complete law school in the late 1970s and afterward returned to his community where he was four times elected chief (1995–2003) and three times elected chair of the Shuswap Nation Tribal Council (1997–2003). During this period, he served as spokesperson of the Interior Alliance of B.C. indigenous nations, and he was at the forefront of the indigenous logging initiative. He also co-chaired the Assembly of First Nations Delgamuukw Implementation Strategic Committee (DISC) that was mandated to develop a national strategy to compel the federal government to respect the historic Supreme Court decision on Aboriginal title and rights.

On the international stage, Manuel participated in the United Nations Permanent Forum on Indigenous Issues since its inception in 2002. He served as chair of the Global indigenous caucus and he was the co-chair of the Forum's North American caucus. He made submissions on human rights violations against Indigenous Peoples by Canada to UN human rights bodies, including under the International Covenant on Civil and Political Rights; the International Covenant on Economic, Social and Cultural Rights; and he was an active participant in the Convention on Biodiversity Conferences of the Parties in The Hague (2002), Kuala Lumpur (2004), Curitiba, Brazil (2006), Bonn, Germany (2008) and Nagoya, Japan (2010).

From 2003 onward, he served as spokesperson for the Indigenous Network on Economies and Trade (INET), a network of indigenous nations working on the international level to achieve recognition of Aboriginal title and rights. Working through INET, Manuel succeeded in having the struggle for Aboriginal title and treaty rights injected into international financial institutions. Three of INET's amicus curiae briefs were accepted by the World Trade Organization and one by the North American Free Trade Agreement showing how Canada's failure to recognize and compensate Aboriginal people for the lumber taken off their traditional lands was a form of subsidy to the lumber industry. These rulings have set important precedents for Aboriginal title and rights in Canada.

Arthur Manuel was also a member of the board of directors of the Seventh Generation Fund for Indigenous Peoples and a spokesperson for the Defenders of the Land, an activist network aligned with the Idle No More movement. His book, Unsettling Canada, A National Wake Up Call, which he coauthored with Grand Chief Ronald Derrickson, won the Canadian History Association Aboriginal Book Award in May 2016. The 2018 Whose Land Is It Anyway? A Manual for Decolonization publication was inspired by Manuel's 2016 speaking tour and includes two posthumously published essays written by Manuel.

Manuel died on January 11, 2017, at the age of 66.

== List of works ==
=== Books ===
Manuel, Arthur and Derrickson, Ronald. 2015. Unsettling Canada, A National Wake Up Call, Between the Lines.

Manuel, Arthur and Ronald Derrickson. 2017. The Reconciliation Manifesto: Recovering the Land, Rebuilding the Economy. Toronto: James Lorimer.

=== Chapters ===
Manuel, Arthur. 2003. Aboriginal Rights on the Ground: Making Section 35 Meaningful. In: A Box of Treasures or Empty Box? Twenty years of Section 35. Theytus Books Ltd.

Manuel, Arthur. 2006. Indigenous brief to WTO: How the denial of Aboriginal title serves as an illegal export subsidy. In: Paradigm Wars. Sierra Club Books.

Manuel, Arthur. 2015. Indigenous Rights and Anti-colonial Struggle in Canada. In: Canada After Harper. Lorimer Books.

Manuel, Arthur. 2017. "From Dispossession to Dependency" in Whose Land Is It Anyway? A Manual for Decolonization. Federation of Post-Secondary Educators of BC. (published posthumously)

Manuel, Arthur. 2017. "The Grassroots Struggle: Defenders of the Land & Idle No More" in Whose Land Is It Anyway? A Manual for Decolonization. Federation of Post-Secondary Educators of BC. (published posthumously)

=== Articles ===
Alexander, Don. 2018. Remembering the work of our Elders: Arthur Manuel. The Vancouver Observer. http://hdl.handle.net/10613/9849

Manuel, Arthur and Schabus, Nicole. 2005. Indigenous peoples at the margins of the global economy: A violation of international human rights and international trade law. Chapman Law Review, 8:229.
