= Federation of Sovereign Indigenous Nations =

First Nations organization in Saskatchewan, Canada

The Federation of Sovereign Indigenous Nations (FSIN), formerly known as the Federation of Saskatchewan Indian Nations, is a Saskatchewan-based First Nations organization. It represents 74 First Nations in Saskatchewan and is committed to honouring the spirit and intent of the Numbered Treaties, as well as the promotion, protection and implementation of these promises made over a century ago.

== Early history ==
Precursors to the FSIN include, in 1919, the establishment of the Indian League of Canada or League of Indians of Canada, based in Ontario, that led to the league holding an annual congress in Saskatchewan, in 1921, at the Thunderchild First Nation. In 1929, The League of Indians of Western Canada is formed, with John Tootoosis of the Poundmaker First Nation the first president. In 1933, a group of Saskatchewan "Treaty #4 First Nations; Pasqua, Piapot, and Muscowpetung," known as the Allied Bands, reorganize to become the Saskatchewan Treaty Protection Association then later, Protective Association for Indians and their Treaties. In 1943, The Association of Saskatchewan Indians, led by Joe Dreaver, is formed and quickly grows to become one of the largest bodies representing First Nations in the province.

Then "the Premier of Saskatchewan, T.C. Douglas became involved. Premier Douglas was concerned about the plight of First Nations people in Saskatchewan. He was interested in helping to unite the three major First Nations organizations in the province." Chiefs and leaders gathered in Fort Qu'Appelle in 1946, amalgamating provincial groups to become the Union of Saskatchewan Indians with John Tootoosis as president. The union was created with the merger of at least two other groups, the Protective Association for the Indians and their Treaties, and the Association of Saskatchewan Indians, (officially incorporated in 1945 with Joe Dreaver as president).

In 1958, the First Nations leaders gathered in Fort Qu'Appelle once again, and reviewed the constitution of the union, replacing it with a new organization that more fairly represented the First Nations reality, the Federation of Saskatchewan Indians, and organized as a non-profit. It was decided that the organization be looked upon as a federation of bands and that the power reside in the hands of the Chiefs. The union dropped its non-profit status and evolved into the Federation of Saskatchewan Indian Nations at the convention of 69 Saskatchewan Indian Chiefs in April 1982 (held the same time as the Canadian Constitution was signed, see Treaties section below). The political convention outlined a governing structure that consisted of the Chiefs-in-Assembly, a Senate, an Elders' Council, an executive council and an Indian Government Commission for the FSIN.

In May 2016 the FSIN Chiefs-in-Assembly voted to change the name to the Federation of Sovereign Indigenous Nations, retaining the acronym FSIN.

== Early activism ==
The intent of FSIN and its precursors, was the defense and protection treaty rights, land and resources, and came from the desire to "foster [the] economic, educational and social growth" of their people.

=== Land ===
==== Saskatchewan Indian Agricultural Program (SIAP) ====
Government policies ensured that First Nations farmers found it difficult to farm. With the advent of SIAP (Saskatchewan Indian Agriculture/al Program) governments were passing some control over to indigenous farmers and "...SIAP offered opportunities for Aboriginal peoples to learn about and gain skills in the agricultural sector" "In the 1970s [the 60's according to the SIAP history in Appendix 5 of the Williams report], the groundwork was laid by the Federation of Saskatchewan Indians, the Saskatchewan Department of Agriculture, the University of Saskatchewan and the Department of Indian and Northern Development" for SIAP. Another source reports Harold Greyeyes and the "Agricultural Rehabilitation and Development Administration (ARDA), in co-operation with the FSIN," established SIAP in 1974. A third source states "SIAP was created under the guidance of Alex Kennedy, a First Nations farmer born in Little Pine First Nation, the first chairman of SIAP – and the second chairman of the former FSIN." Regardless, SIAP was funded in 1975, incorporated in 1978 (with a new logo designed by indigenous artist Gerald McMaster), and ended in 1995, though another source states 2002.

SIAP aimed to 'promote interest in the agriculture industry, develop economically viable farm units and to improve the productive capacity of Indian reserve lands.' Alex Kennedy "envisioned farming and agriculture as ideal initiatives to regain lands leased out to non-Indigenous farmers and carve out an agricultural economy for Indigenous communities. A significant component of the SIAP strategy was education and training courses to integrate both farming techniques and farm business literacy to prospective First Nations farmers." In 1977, SIAP was described as "originally intended to establish 350 individual farm units over the initial 5 year period. However, the thrust of the program is being modified with major emphasis now on the development of large (5-10,000 acre) band owned farms." An article published by the Ag. Rep. in the February 1979 Saskatchewan Indian profiles only four successful band farms, including Star Blanket, and notes reasons for the failure of others. SIAP and its efforts were also profiled in 1981. As of 1989, "SIAP has diversified its activities into a number of areas, including wild rice, alfalfa farming, ethanol production, game ranching (deer, buffalo, elf), and fish farming." "At its 'zenith … [SIAP] created 600 viable farm units, a marketing company, a loan company and a venture capital company' (Saskatchewan Agriculture Hall of Fame 2014)." In 1993, Ken Thomas made a presentation to the Royal Commission on Aboriginal Peoples, outlining the successes of the program. Gerald Starr, a Tom Longboat Award Winner from 1952, manager of Star Blanket Farm, is recorded as chairman of the board in the 1980s.

- Saskatchewan Indian Agricultural Program (SIAP) - 4H Program. SIAP organized and funded the successful "Indian 4-H" program until it reportedly ended around 1980 or 1990. Harold Greyeyes worked with the 4-H program for many years.
- SIAP Marketing Co. Inc.(incorporated 1984), a subsidiary of SIAP Inc. eventually became Grey Owl Marketing, to market wild rice, and industry encouraged and supported by SIAP. Gerald Starr is also recorded as chairman of the board for this subsidiary.
- SIAP set up the Saskatchewan Indian Loan Company (SILCO) to make agricultural loans to First Nations farmers. It later amalgamated with the Saskatchewan Indian Equity Company as did Inpro West Investment Corporation (INPRO), in 2002–03.

==== Treaties ====
"Although small portions of present-day Saskatchewan include lands from Treaty 2 (1871) and Treaty 7 (1877), the five major historical or numbered treaties of this province are Treaty 4 (1874), Treaty 5 (1875–76), Treaty 6 (1876), Treaty 8 (1899–1900), and Treaty 10 (1906–07)."

Over many years the FSI attempted to be recognized and participate in discussions and decisions around the "repatriation" of the Constitution of Canada. These efforts are reported in the Saskatchewan Indian (see Publications below). In April 1982 (the same month the Constitution was signed) the First Nations signed the Federation of Saskatchewan Indian Nations Convention, and agreed to unite in a common front to protect and preserve First Nations' Treaty rights and their political, economic, social and cultural characteristics.

In 1989 the FSIN and the Government of Canada agreed to "create an independent and impartial office which, at that time, would serve to research and provide recommendations on the issues of treaty land entitlement and education for First Nations in Saskatchewan," called the Office of the Treaty Commissioner (1991?-1996). This office's mandate was expanded and the term extended for another five years (1997–2002) which then stretched to ten years. This Office remains in existence today.

=== Education and society ===
==== Colleges ====
SIAP offered courses in the agricultural sector, sometimes through or at the premises of the Saskatchewan Indian Cultural College and/or the Saskatchewan Indian Federated College and/or at the Saskatchewan Indian Community College.

The Saskatchewan Indian Cultural College was established in 1972. Its name changed to Saskatchewan Indian Cultural Centre and eventually, the Saskatchewan Indigenous Cultural Centre (SICC) in 2016. It was established as a teaching institution to strengthen and support the overall First Nations education and cultural awareness of First Nations People. It was the first First Nations controlled educational institution serving at the provincial level.

The Saskatchewan Indian Federated College, proposed in 1971 and an eventual spin-off of the Saskatchewan Indian Cultural College, was established in 1976 and immediately federated with the University of Regina in May of that same year. "Initially, it offered a Bachelor of Arts Program in Indian Studies within the Faculty of Arts. Other accredited programs were subsequently developed and implemented: Indian Art, Indian Education, Indian Management and Administration, and Indian Social Work Education. All these programs are academically integrated with their respective University of Regina facilities. Ida Wasacase was the first director of the SIFC." Blair Stonechild (Muscowpetung) was the first lecturer. In 1996, 30 years after inception, it remained "the only Indian-controlled, university-level college in the country." In 2003, its name changed to the First Nations University of Canada and gained a new vision statement “The First Nations University of Canada provides an opportunity for students of all nations to learn in an environment of First Nations cultures and values. The university is a special place of learning where we recognize the spiritual power of knowledge and where knowledge is respected and promoted,” and a new building by Indigenous architect Douglas Cardinal.

Founded as the Saskatchewan Indian Community College in 1976, apparently as an off-shoot of the Federated College with a focus on adult education programs, and awarding certificates and diplomas in various technological and vocational fields, SICC's name changed to Saskatchewan Indian Institute of Technologies (SIIT) in 1985. In 2000, the province enacted the Saskatchewan Indian Institute of Technologies Act that acknowledged the school as a full, post-secondary institution.

==== Selection of publications ====
The Worldcat Identities database record for the Federation of Saskatchewan Indians clearly shows a time frame for their publications, based on items held at various libraries. Roughly 84 works from 1970 to 1985 are recorded, published in one language. The Federation of Saskatchewan Indian Nations Identity record clearly shows a stronger record of publishing, with roughly 168 works in more languages (4), from 1982–1983 to 2015–2016. There have not been a significant number of publications held at libraries, published by the Federation of Sovereign Indigenous Nations. There have been publications from committees and task forces, plus the colleges and University, not included under the names listed above. The Saskatchewan Indigenous Cultural Centre holds a number of items, searchable in their library catalogue.

- The Saskatchewan Indian [journal], 1970-1983(?) or 2011. Originally published by FSI, FSIN, then by the Saskatchewan Indian Media Corporation (funded 1987–1990).
  - In July 1979 the Saskatchewan Indian produced an issue titled The Constitutional Journey outlining indigenous efforts to be recognized and involved in deliberations around the Constitution.
  - April 1982 the "Constitution Special Issue" published, dated the same day the Constitution of Canada was signed. It covered the history, law and politics of indigenous efforts to be recognized and included in the process of repatriation [the Constitution] and Canada acquiring independence. Articles document efforts to be included in the process, including the work of FSI's Constitution Commission (pre-repatriation efforts).
- Principles of Indian Government, 1975 and/or 1977 [unpublished but much quoted].
- Opekokew, Delia (ed). The First Nations: Indian Government and the Canadian Confederation. Federation of Saskatchewan Indians, 1980.
- Opekokew, Delia. The First Nations: Indian Government and the Community of Man, 1982.
- Ahenakew, Freda. Nēhiyaw nikamona: songs in Cree and English. Saskatoon: Federation of Saskatchewan Indian Nations, 1986.
- Ahenakew, Freda, and Shirley M. Fredeen. Our language, our survival. Saskatoon: Federation of Saskatchewan Indian Nations, 1987.

=== Economy ===
Saskatchewan Indian Equity Foundation, established in 1986, is now the Saskatchewan Indian Equity Foundation, Inc. In 2002–03 it amalgamated with SIAP's Saskatchewan Indian Loan Company and the Inpro West Investment Corporation (INPRO).

== Honours awarded ==
The Chiefs Assembly honoured Gwendolyn Lucy O'Soup Crane for her lifetime achievements and recognized her as Canada's first female, First Nations Chief (of The Key First Nation), first elected under the current electoral system.

== List of presidents and chiefs ==
Presidents and chiefs of the FSI and FSIN include:

- John Tootoosis (1958–1961)
- David Knight (1961–1964)
- Wilfred Bellegarde (1964–66)
- Walter Deiter (1966–68)
- David Ahenakew (1968–1978)
- Albert Bellegarde (1978–1979)
- Sol Sanderson (1979–1986)
- Roland Crowe (1986–1994)
- Blaine Favel (1994–1998)
- Perry Bellegarde (1998–2003)
- Alphonse Bird (2003–2006)
- Lawrence Joseph (2006–2009)
- Guy Lonechild (2009–2011)
- Morley Watson, interim (2011–2012)
- Perry Bellegarde (2012–2014)
- Kim Jonathan, interim (2014–2015)
- Bobby Cameron (2015–present)

== List of Saskatchewan First Nations ==
Name	Location	Population	Language	Number	Size
Carry the Kettle First Nation	53 miles East of Regina along the TransCanada #1 Highway	2387 (850 on reserve, 1537 off reserve	Nakota (Assiniboine)	378	15 km x 13 km
Cowesses First Nation	20 kilometres North of Broadview, off highway #1	3526 (712 on reserve)	Cree, Salteaux, English	73	8 miles x 12 miles
Fishing Lake First Nation	Near Wadena	1500	Saulteaux	390	233 acres
George Gordon First Nation	8 km from Punnichy, 125 km NE of Regina	3106 (1100 on reserve)	Cree and Saulteaux	86	145 square km
Kahkewistahaw First Nation	150 km east of Regina	Nil	Saulteaux, Cree	362	Nil
Kawacatoose First Nation	Near Raymore, Quinton, Punnichy	2746 (731 on reserve, 115 rural towns, 1900 urban / off reserve)	Cree and Ojibway	88	6 square km + 12,200 acres purchased land
Lac la Ronge First Nation	Multi-Community: Reserves at La Ronge, Stanley Mission, Grandmother's Bay, Little Red River, Sucker River and Hall Lake.	8,666	Woodland Cree	353	6 Reserve Communities and 18 Separate Reserve lands, with a total land mass of 107,001 acres. The acreage of each reserve ranges from .49 acres to 34,955 acres.
Piapot First Nation	50 km NE of Regina in the Qu'Appelle Valley	2020 (580 on reserve)	Cree	385	6 miles x 5 miles
Sakimay First Nation	100 km E of Regina	1412	Nakawe (Saulteaux)	364	Nil
Standing Buffalo Dakota First Nation	Qu'Appelle Valley	1,111	Dakota	386	2,246.1 hectares
Poundmaker Cree First Nation	North Battleford	1281 (505 on reserve)	Cree	Nil	Nil
Little Pine First Nation	53 km NW of Battleford	Nil	Plains Cree	Nil	Nil
Mosquito Grizzly Bear's Head First Nation	30 km S of Battleford	1243 (644 on reserve)	Assiniboine	Nil	Nil
Lucky Man First Nation	60 km E of North Battleford near Mayfair	Nil	Nil	Nil	Nil
Day Star First Nation	Nil	Nil	Nil	Nil	Nil
George Gordon First Nation	Nil	Nil	Cree and Saulteaux	Nil	Nil
Muskowekwan First Nation	Nil	Nil	Saulteaux	392	Nil
Whitecap Dakota First Nation	26 km S of Saskatoon	521	Dakota	372	4,913 acres
Yellow Quill First Nation	267 km NE of Saskatoon	Nil	Saulteaux	376	5,926.4 hectares
Big River First Nation	Debden	Nil	Cree	404	119.648 km^{2}
Pelican Lake First Nation	Leaville	Nil	Nil	Nil	191
Witchekan First Nation	Spiritwood	Nil	Nil	Nil	Nil
Ahtahkakoop First Nation	Shell Lake	3,661	Cree	104	42,866 acres
Moosomin First Nation	Cochin	Nil	Cree	112	50,000 acres
Red Pheasant First Nation	Cando	Nil	Nil	Nil	Nil
Sweetgrass First Nation	Gallivan	Nil	Nil	Nil	Nil
Young Chippewayan First Nation	Gallivan	Nil	Nil	Nil	Nil
Little Black Bear First Nation	Goodeve	Nil	Nil	Nil	Nil
Muscowpetung First Nation	Fort Qu'Appelle	Nil	Nil	Nil	Nil
Nekaneet First Nation	Maple Creek	Nil	Nil	Nil	Nil
Okanese First Nation	Balcarres	Nil	Nil	Nil	Nil
Pasqua First Nation	Fort Qu'Appelle	Nil	Nil	Nil	Nil
Peepeekisis First Nation	Balcarres	Nil	Nil	Nil	Nil
Piapot First Nation	Zehner	Nil	Nil	Nil	Nil
Standing Buffalo First Nation	Fort Qu'Appelle	Nil	Nil	Nil	Nil
Star Blanket First Nation	Balcarres	Nil	Nil	Nil	Nil
Wood Mountain First Nation	Assiniboia	Nil	Nil	Nil	Nil
Birch Narrows First Nation	Turnor Lake	Nil	Nil	Nil	Nil
Buffalo River First Nation	Dillon	Nil	Nil	Nil	Nil
Canoe Lake First Nation	Canoe Narrows	Nil	Nil	Nil	Nil
Clearwater River Dene First Nation	La Loche	Nil	Nil	Nil	Nil
English River First Nation	Patuanak	Nil	Nil	Nil	Nil
Flying Dust First Nation	Meadow Lake	Nil	Nil	Nil	Nil
Island Lake First Nation	Loon Lake	Nil	Nil	Nil	Nil
Makwa Sahgaiehcan First Nation	Loon Lake	Nil	Nil	Nil	Nil
Waterhen Lake First Nation	Waterhen Lake	Nil	Nil	Nil	Nil
Opawakoscikan First Nation	Prince Albert	Nil	Nil	Nil	Nil
Black Lake Denesuline First Nation	Black Lake	Nil	Nil	Nil	Nil
Cumberland House Cree Nation	Cumberland House	912 (on reserve), 837 (off reserve)	Swampy Cree	350	21.458 km^{2}
Fond Du Lac Denesuline First Nation	Fond Du Lac	Nil	Nil	Nil	Nil
Hatchet Lake Denesuline First Nation	Wollaston Lake	Nil	Nil	Nil	Nil
James Smith First Nation	Melfort	Nil	Nil	Nil	Nil
Montreal Lake Cree First Nation	Montreal Lake	Nil	Nil	Nil	Nil
Peter Ballantyne Cree First Nation	Pelican Narrows	Nil	Nil	Nil	Nil
Red Earth First Nation	Red Earth	on reserve population of approximately 1,300 members and 300 members residing off the reserve.	Cree	Nil	Nil
Shoal Lake First Nation	Pakwaw Lake	Nil	Cree	Nil	Nil
Sturgeon Lake First Nation	Shellbrook	Nil	Nil	Nil	Nil
Wahpetan Dakota First Nation	Prince Albert	Nil	Nil	Nil	Nil
Kinistin Saulteaux First Nation	Tisdale	Nil	Nil	Nil	Nil
Mistawasis First Nation	Leask	Nil	Nil	Nil	Nil
Muskeg Lake Cree First Nation	Marcelin	Nil	Nil	Nil	Nil
Muskoday First Nation	Muskoday	Nil	Nil	Cree	Nil
One Arrow First Nation	Bellevue	Nil	Nil	Nil	Nil
Ochapowace First Nation	Whitewood	Nil	Nil	Nil	Nil
White Bear First Nation	Carlyle	Nil	Nil	Nil	Nil
Cote First Nation	Kamsack	Nil	Nil	Nil	Nil
Kahkewistahaw First Nation	Broadview	Nil	Nil	Nil	Nil
Keeseekoose First Nation	Kamsack	Nil	Nil	Nil	Nil
Key First Nation	Norquay	Nil	Nil	Nil	Nil
Ocean Man First Nation	Stoughton	Nil	Nil	Nil	Nil
Beardy's & Okemasis First Nation	Duck Lake	3,520 (approx. 1,400 O/R)	Plains Cree	#97&96	50,274.97
Big Island First Nation	Pierceland	Nil	Nil	Nil	Nil
Chacachas First Nation	Nil	Nil	Nil	Nil	Nil
Chakastapaysin First Nation	Nil	Nil	Nil	Nil	Nil
Onion Lake Cree Nation	Onion Lake	Nil	Nil	Nil	Nil
Peter Chapman First Nation	Nil	Nil	Nil	Nil	Nil
Pheasant Rump Nakota First Nation	10 km north of Kisbey	Nil	Nil	Nil	Nil
Saulteaux First Nation	Cochin	Nil	Nil	Nil	Nil
Thunderchild First Nation	Turtleford	Nil	Nil	Nil	Nil

== See also ==
- List of Indian reserves in Saskatchewan
