= Delbert Riley =

Canadian First Nations leader

Chief of the National Indian Brotherhood
- In office 1980–1982
- Preceded by: Noel Starblanket
- Succeeded by: David Ahenakew

Personal details
- Born: 1941 (age 84–85) Chippewas of the Thames First Nation 42, Ontario, Ontario

Delbert Riley is a Canadian First Nations leader of Chippewa background. He was chief of the National Indian Brotherhood (known today as the Assembly of First Nations) from 1980 to 1982. Riley also presided over the Union of Ontario Indians.

== Biography ==
Riley was born in the Chippewas of the Thames First Nations community near St. Thomas, Ontario. As a child he had spent time in a tuberculosis sanatorium before being sent to Mohawk Institute Residential School near Brantford, Ontario. He graduated from the University of Western Ontario.

Riley was elected as chief of the National Indian Brotherhood in 1980, succeeding Noel Starblanket.
