= Balcarres, Saskatchewan =

Town in Saskatchewan, Canada

Balcarres
- Town
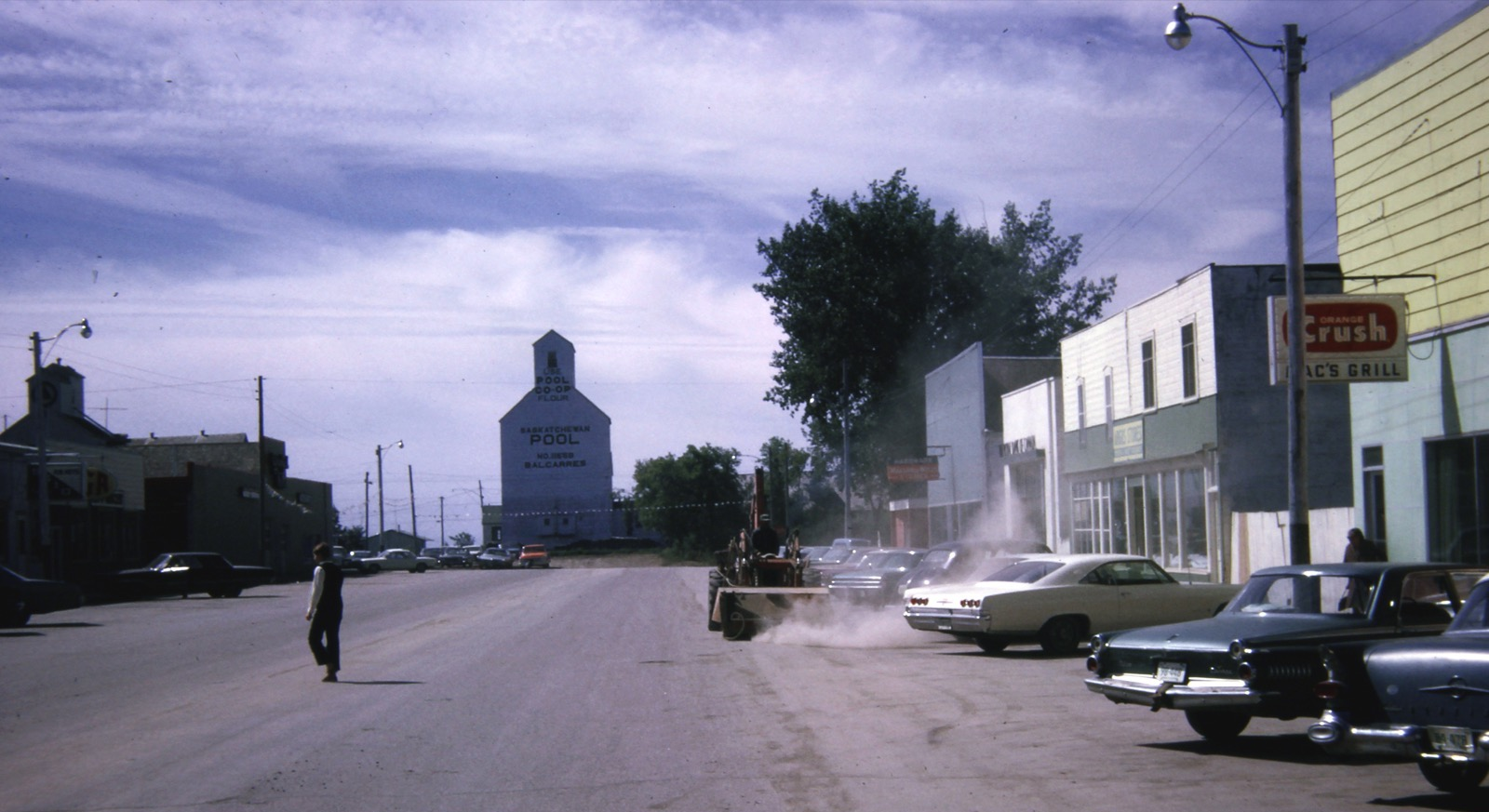
- Balcarres Main Street in 1968

- Location of Balcarres in Saskatchewan
- Coordinates: 50°48′00″N 103°32′40″W
- Country: Canada
- Province: Saskatchewan
- Rural Municipality (RM): Abernethy No. 186
- Post Office founded NWT: 1884-04-01

Government
  - Mayor: Dwight Dixon
  - Administrator: Bev Gelech
  - Governing body: Balcarres Town Council

Area
  - Total: 1.57 km^{2} (0.61 sq mi)

Population (2011)
  - Total: 617
  - Density: 392.9/km^{2} (1,018/sq mi)
- Time zone: UTC−6
  - Summer (DST): CST
- Postal code: S0G 0C0
- Area code: 306
- Highways: Highway 10 / Highway 22 / Highway 310 / Highway 619
- Website: townofbalcarres.ca

Balcarres (/bəlˈkɛərrɪs/ bel-KAIR-is); 2006 population 598) is a town located in southern Saskatchewan, Canada, at the intersection of Highways 10, 22, 310, and 619, approximately 85 kilometres (53 mi) northeast of Regina. The town is about 15 kilometres (9.3 mi) northeast of the Fishing Lakes.

Neighbouring communities include Fort Qu'Appelle to the west, to the southeast Abernethy, and to the north Ituna. The File Hills First Nations of Little Black Bear, Peepeekisis, Okanese, and Star Blanket are also located to the northeast.

== History ==
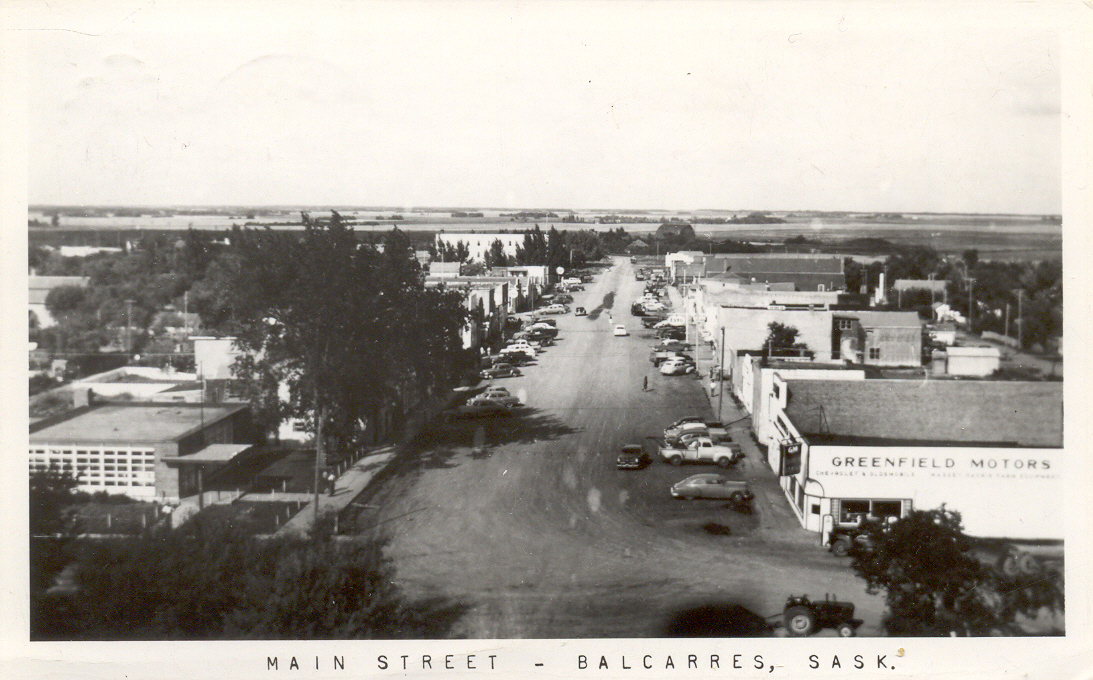
Historical view of Balcarres

Balcarres post office was established in the North-West Territories on 1 April 1884. The name originates from the first postmaster, Balcarres Crawford, at the neighbouring community of Indian Head, North-West Territories (now, since 1905, Saskatchewan).

== Demographics ==
In the 2021 Census of Population conducted by Statistics Canada, Balcarres had a population of 616 living in 257 of its 271 total private dwellings, a change of 4.9% from its 2016 population of 587. With a land area of 1.62 km^{2} (0.63 sq mi), it had a population density of 380.2/km^{2} (984.8/sq mi) in 2021.

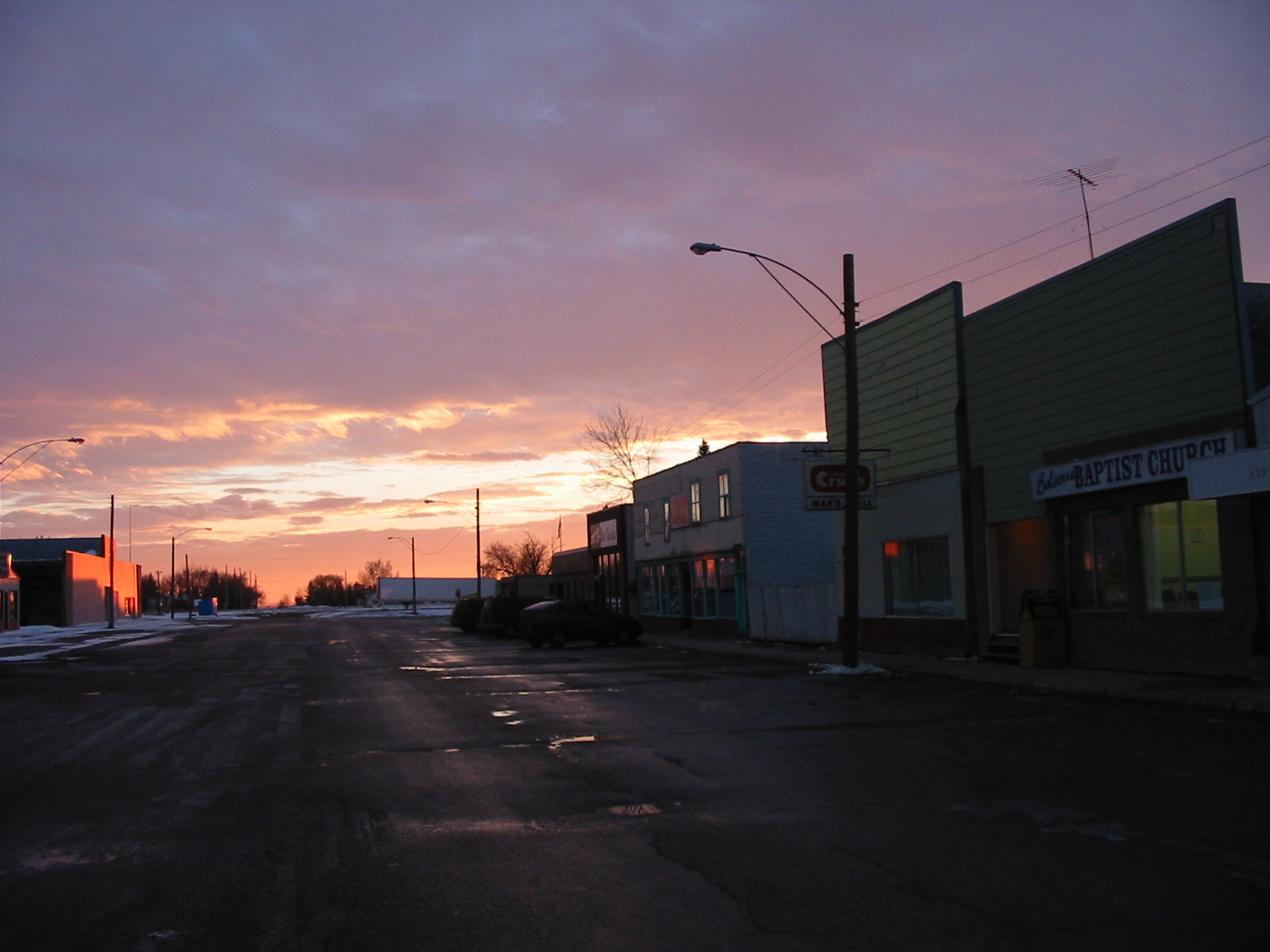
Balcarres Main Street in 2002

Canada census – Balcarres community profile

| | 2021 | 2011 |
| Population | 616 (+4.9% from 2016) | 617 (+3.2% from 2006) |
| Land area | 1.62 km^{2} (0.63 sq mi) | 1.57 km^{2} (0.61 sq mi) |
| Population density | 381.3/km^{2} (988/sq mi) | 392.9/km^{2} (1,018/sq mi) |
| Median age | 45.2 (M: 43.6, F: 47.6) | 47.6 (M: 46.1, F: 49.4) |
| Private dwellings | 271 (total) 257 (occupied) | 261 (total) |
| Median household income | $63,200 |

References: 2021 2011

== Amenities ==
The town is home to several businesses including a grocery store, inn, pharmacy, bank, and restaurants. Terminal 22, a large inland grain terminal, is located west of town along the Canadian National Railway rail line.

Balcarres has a hospital and senior citizens home called the Balcarres Integrated Care Centre or BICC, and an elementary and high school, which educates children from the communities of Balcarres, Abernethy, and the File Hills Indian reserves. There is a Baptist church.

== Notable people ==
- Walter Deiter, chief of the National Indian Brotherhood
- James Garfield Gardiner, premier of Saskatchewan and minister in the Canadian Cabinet
- Mandy Meyer, guitar player for Asia and Krokus
- Kenneth Moore, ice hockey player in the 1932 Winter Olympics.
- Noel Starblanket, chief of the National Indian Brotherhood
- Doug Trapp, ice hockey player
- Jerry Walker, ice hockey player

== See also ==
- List of towns in Saskatchewan
