= Ovide Mercredi =

Chief of the Assembly of First Nations and politician in Canada

Ovide Mercredi OC OM
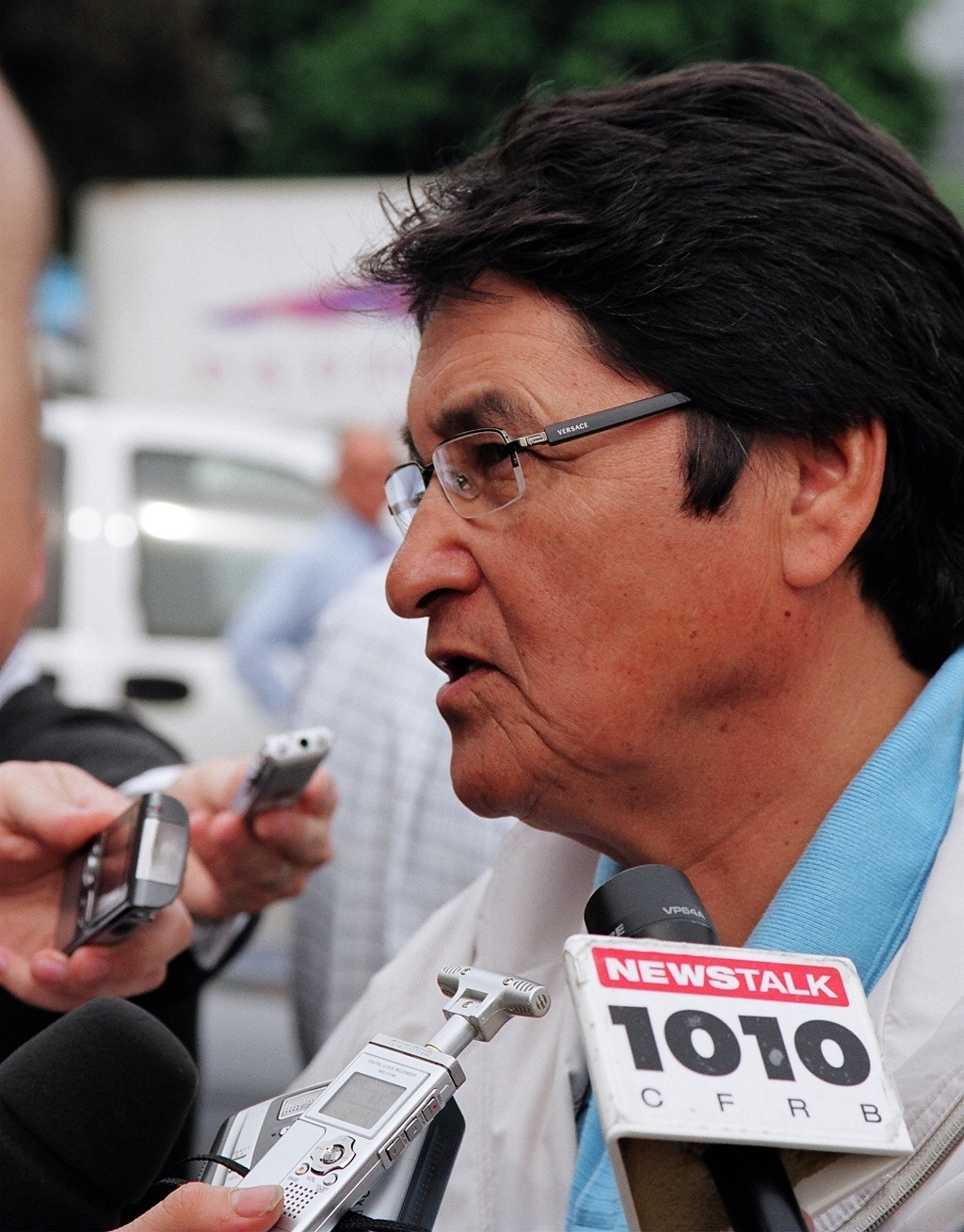

President of the Manitoba New Democratic Party
- In office February 7, 2015 – March 18, 2017
- Leader: Greg Selinger; Flor Marcelino (interim)
- Preceded by: Ellen Olfert
- Succeeded by: David Woodbury

National Chief of the Assembly of First Nations
- In office 1991–1997
- Preceded by: Georges Erasmus
- Succeeded by: Phil Fontaine

Chief of the Misipawistik Cree Nation
- In office 2005–2011

Personal details
- Born: Ovide William Mercredi; January 30, 1946 (age 80) Grand Rapids, Manitoba, Canada
- Party: New Democratic
- Spouse: Beryle Taylor (d. 2004)
- Education: University of Manitoba
- Profession: Lawyer

Ovide William Mercredi OC OM (born January 30, 1946) is a Canadian politician. He is Cree and a former National Chief of the Assembly of First Nations. He is also the former president of the Manitoba New Democratic Party.

== Early life and career ==
A Cree, Ovide Mercredi was born in the Grand Rapids reserve of the Misipawistik Cree Nation, in central Manitoba. But he lived outside the reserve because his mother was stripped of her Indian status when she married a Métis (a person of mixed indigenous and European descent). Mercredi attended the University of Manitoba and graduated with a degree in law in 1977. While a student he became President of the first native students' association formed in Canada. He was elected Regional Chief of the Assembly of First Nations for Manitoba in 1989. Mercredi had specialized in constitutional law, and became a key strategist for the Assembly during the time of the Meech Lake Accord constitutional reform discussions. He also had a strong leadership role in resolving the Oka Crisis.

Mercredi was elected as National Chief for the Assembly of First Nations, the national political body representing over 600 First Nations chiefs across Canada. During his first term, Mercredi played a major role in the Charlottetown Accord constitutional discussions. He was re-elected as National Chief in 1994, and served until 1997. As National Chief, Mercredi addressed the United Nations in both Geneva and New York. He also led a Canadian delegation to the troubled area of the Mexican state of Chiapas.

In addition to serving as a lawyer and politician, Mercredi is an author. He co-wrote, with Justice Mary Ellen Turpel-Lafond, the 1993 book In The Rapids: Navigating the Future of First Nations.

Mercredi is an advocate of non-violent methods for change and has been nominated by the Government of India for the Gandhi Peace Prize. He has also received honorary law degrees from Saint Mary's University, Cape Breton University and Bishop's University.

== Career since his national chiefship ==
In April 2005, Mercredi announced he would challenge Bev Desjarlais for the New Democratic Party nomination in the riding of Churchill for the next federal election, but he later withdrew his candidacy.

In May 2007, Mercredi along with his fellow Manitoba chiefs began seeking compensation from Manitoba Telecom Services for every cellphone signal that passes through First Nations land, saying the airspace should be considered a resource like land and water. Mercredi was quoted as saying, "When it comes to using airspace, it's like using our water and simply because there's no precedent doesn't mean that it's not the right thing to do."

He is the former chancellor of University College of the North in northern Manitoba, and delivered his inaugural address at a ceremony on November 6, 2007.

On June 12, 2009, Ovide Mercredi received an honorary Doctor of Letters degree from Athabasca University.

Mercredi became Chief of the Misipawistik Cree Nation and served his community from 2005 to 2011.

In 2012, Mercredi endorsed Sheila Copps' bid for the presidency of the Liberal Party of Canada.

In 2013, Ovide Mercredi received the Distinguished Alumni Award from the University of Manitoba.

He was elected president of the Manitoba New Democratic Party on March 7, 2015. While now the president of a political party, he has previously publicly questioned the utility of voting. Mercredi, at the age of 72, announced that he would step down from his position.

On October 22, 2015, Ovide Mercredi launched his book of poetry called My Silent Drum published by Aboriginal Issues Press. All proceeds of the book will go towards a scholarship for an indigenous student at the University of Manitoba.

== See also ==
- Aboriginal Canadian personalities
