= Shawn Atleo =

Canadian politician

Shawn A-in-chut Atleo
- Ah-up-wa-eek
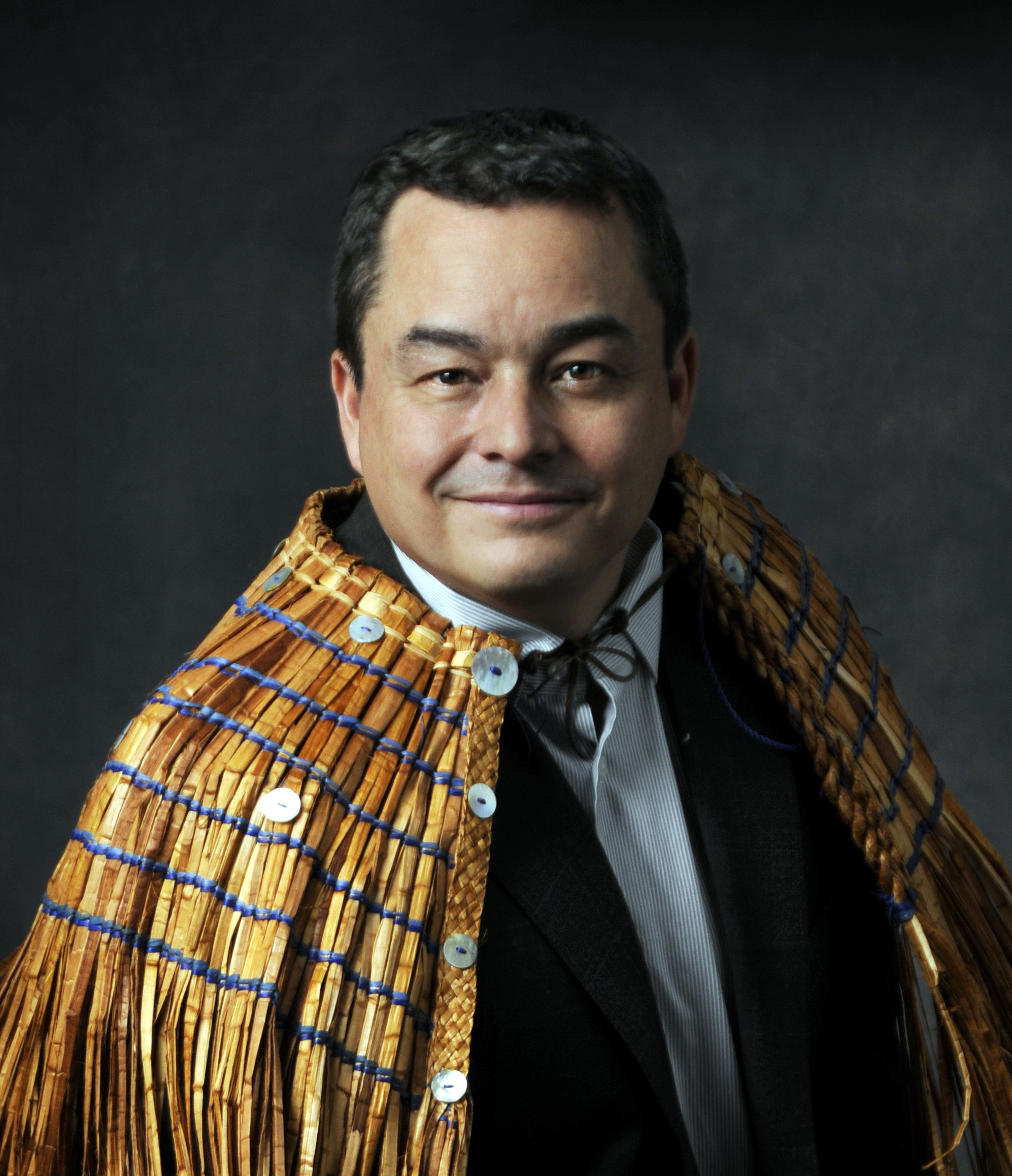

National Chief of the Assembly of First Nations
- In office 2009–2014
- Preceded by: Phil Fontaine
- Succeeded by: Ghislain Picard (interim)

Personal details
- Born: 1967 (age 58–59) Vancouver, British Columbia
- Spouse(s): Nancy Atleo (m. 1986–2014) Heather Squire (m. 2017)
- Education: University of Technology, Sydney

Shawn A-in-chut Atleo (Ahousaht First Nation, born 1967), is a Canadian activist and politician, a former National Chief of the Assembly of First Nations in Canada (serving 2009 to 2014). He also has served since 1999 as a Hereditary Chief of the Ahousaht First Nation, part of the Nuu-chah-nulth Nation based in British Columbia.

== Early years ==
Atleo was born in 1967 in Vancouver, British Columbia to an Ahousaht First Nation family. He traveled abroad for a Master of Education in Adult Learning and Global Change (MEd) from the University of Technology in Sydney, Australia.

As an adult, Atleo became an activist for the rights of First Nations in Canada. He formerly served as Regional Chief (British Columbia) of the Assembly of First Nations. Since 1999 he served as a Hereditary Chief (Hiwilth) of the Ahousaht First Nation, which is part of the Nuu-chah-nulth Nation.

== AFN leadership ==
Atleo was elected as the AFN's National Chief on July 23, 2009, at the leadership convention. He defeated Perry Bellegarde (Little Black Bear First Nation) after eight rounds of voting.

He was re-elected for a second term on July 19, 2012, in the third round of voting at the AFN's 2012 leadership convention. He resigned from his position as AFN Chief on May 2, 2014, amid controversy over Bill C-33, the First Nations Control of First Nations Education Act.

== Duties outside of AFN ==
In 2008, Atleo was appointed as Chancellor of Vancouver Island University in Nanaimo, British Columbia. He was the first university chancellor appointed in the province's history who was of Aboriginal heritage.

Atleo has also served as executive director of a family addictions treatment facility and of an Aboriginal post-secondary training institute, Umeek Human Resource Development. He participated in drafting the United Nations Declaration on the Rights of Indigenous Peoples. He also led a delegation to assist in rebuilding indigenous communities in Indonesia following the 2004 Indian Ocean earthquake and tsunami.

== Personal life ==
Atleo is a first cousin of Canadian electronic musician and producer Rhys Fulber. He is known for appearing on the Roadrunner United track "The End".

== Awards and honorary degrees ==
- The College of Family Physicians of Canada/Scotiabank Family Medicine Lectureship Award (2013).
- Honorary Doctorate of Laws Degree from University of Cape Breton (2013).
- Honorary Doctorate of Letters Degree from University of New Brunswick (2013).
- 2013 Indspire Award (formerly the National Aboriginal Achievement Award) for Education.
- Honorary Doctorate of Laws Degree from University of Guelph (2013).
- Queen Elizabeth II Diamond Jubilee Medal presented by Governor General David Johnston (2012).
- Honorary Doctorate of Laws Degree from Ryerson University (2012).
- Honorary Doctorate of Laws Degree from Queen's University (2012).
- Honorary Doctorate of Civil Law Degree from Bishop's University (2012).
- Honorary Doctor of Technology Degree from British Columbia Institute of Technology (BCIT) (2012).
- Vancouver Magazine Power 50 Award (2011).
- Ottawa Life Magazine Top 50 list of Capital People (2011).
- Distinguished Alumni Award from the University of Technology, Sydney (2011).
- Vancouver Magazine Power 50 Award (2010).
- Honorary Doctor of Education Degree from Nipissing University (2010).
- Vancouver Magazine Power 50 Award (2009).

Academic offices
Preceded by New position	Chancellor of Vancouver Island University; September 2008–2014	Incumbent
