= Fort Qu'Appelle Indian Hospital =

Indian Hospital
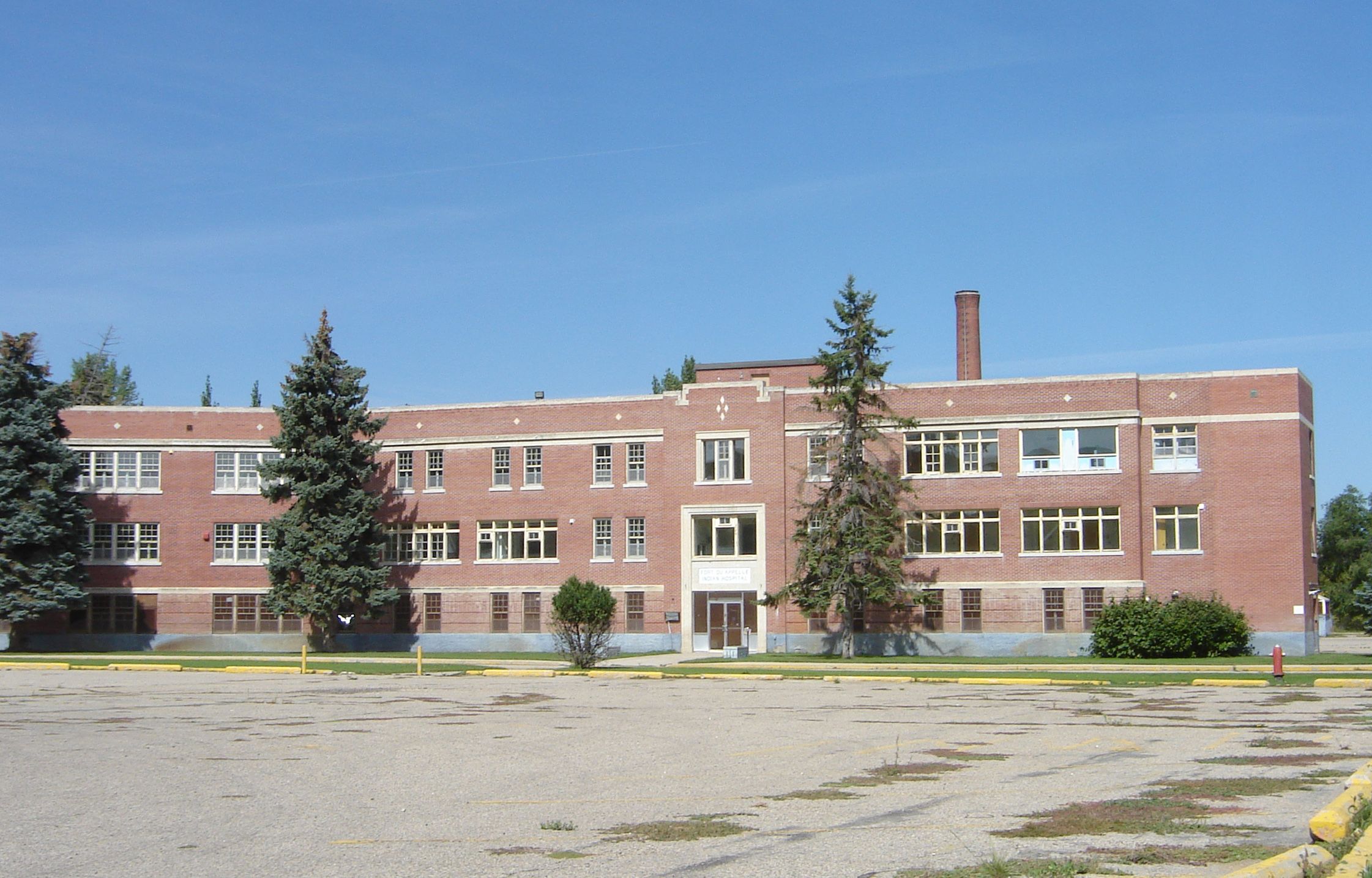

Geography
- Location: Broad Street, Fort Qu'Appelle, Saskatchewan, Canada
- Coordinates: 50.77040°N 103.80434°W

Organization
- Care system: Public
- Type: Community

History
- Founded: 1909
- Closed: 2004

Links
- Lists: Hospitals in Canada

Indian Hospital (also called Indian Services Hospital or Hôpital indien) was a public hospital in Fort Qu'Appelle, Saskatchewan. The hospital was originally built by the federal government and specialized as a 50-bed tuberculosis treatment facility. When responsibility of TB was later taken over by the Fort Sanatorium this facility transitioned to one of many Indian hospitals administered by the federal government across Canada. Early in the 1990s the Touchwood File Hills Qu'Appelle Tribal Council (TFHQTC, now Touchwood Agency Tribal Council and File Hills Qu’Appelle Tribal Council) commenced negotiations to assume responsibility for the delivery of emergency and acute care services in the Fort Qu'Appelle Indian Hospital with the federal and provincial governments and the local health authority. Negotiations successfully concluded in 1996 with an agreement between the parties for the provision of full hospital services by the TFHQTC.

The Fort Qu'Appelle Indian Hospital operated as a rural hospital until it was replaced in 2004 by the culturally significant and modern All Nations' Healing Hospital. The hospital is a designated federal heritage property, however after having been unoccupied for more than a decade, it became derelict and has since been demolished.

The architect of the 1936 building was Roland Guerney Orr, Chief Architect of the Department of Indian Affairs (now Crown–Indigenous Relations and Northern Affairs Canada and Indigenous Services Canada).
