= Matthew Coon Come =

Canadian Politician

Matthew Coon Come OC

National Chief of the Assembly of First Nations
- In office 2000–2003
- Preceded by: Phil Fontaine
- Succeeded by: Phil Fontaine

Personal details
- Born: April 13, 1956 (age 70) Mistissini, Quebec, Canada

Matthew Coon Come OC (born April 13, 1956) is a Canadian politician and activist of Cree descent. He was National Chief of the Assembly of First Nations from 2000 to 2003.

Born near Mistissini, Quebec, Coon Come was first educated at LaTuque Indian Residential School, in LaTuque, Quebec, part of the residential school system. He later studied political science at Trent University, and law at McGill University.

Coon Come was first elected as grand chief and chairman of Quebec's Grand Council of the Crees in 1987. He became known internationally for his efforts to defend the fundamental rights of First Nations peoples, notably in the campaign against the Quebec government's James Bay hydroelectric project.

== Awards and honours ==
Coon Come was awarded with a National Aboriginal Achievement Award, now the Indspire Awards, in 1995. He has also received 2 honorary degrees, including:

Honorary degrees

Country	Date	School	Degree
Canada	1998	Trent University	Doctor of Laws (LL.D)
Canada	2000	University of Toronto	Doctor of Laws (LL.D)
