= Phil Fontaine =

Aboriginal Canadian leader (born 1944)

Phil Fontaine OC OM

National Chief of the Assembly of First Nations
- In office 1997–2000
- Preceded by: Ovide Mercredi
- Succeeded by: Matthew Coon Come
- In office 2003–2009
- Preceded by: Matthew Coon Come
- Succeeded by: Shawn Atleo

Personal details
- Born: September 20, 1944 (age 82) Fort Alexander, Manitoba, Canada
- Education: University of Manitoba (BA)

Larry Phillip Fontaine, OC OM (born September 20, 1944) is an Indigenous Canadian leader and former National Chief of the Assembly of First Nations. He is known for his role in raising public awareness of the Canadian Indian residential school system and pushing to secure Federal and Papal apologies in 2008 and 2022 respectively. He also helped secure a repudiation of Discovery doctrine from Pope Francis on March 30, 2023.

== Early life ==
Fontaine, an Ojibwe, was born September 20, 1944 to Jean Baptiste Fontaine and Agnes Mary Spence at the Sagkeeng First Nation on the Fort Alexander Reserve No. 3 near Pine Falls, Manitoba, There were twelve children in the family, ten boys and two girls. His father died in 1952, and his mother in 1988. His first language is Ojibway.

Fontaine attended the Fort Alexander Indian Residential School on his reserve and the Assiniboia Indian Residential School on Academy Road in Winnipeg. He graduated from Powerview Collegiate, a public high school in Powerview-Pine Falls, in 1961. After high school graduation, Fontaine took a bookkeeping course at the Manitoba Commercial College in Winnipeg, was a trainee with the Department of Indian Affairs, and a youth activist with the Canadian Indian Youth Council (a youth organization formed by the National Indian Council, a forerunner of the Assembly of First Nations), and a Project Director with the Company of Young Canadians. At the age of 22, Fontaine was hired by Chief David Courchene as Band Manager for the Fort Alexander Indian Band (now the Sagkeeng First Nation).

In 1973, Fontaine was elected Chief of the Fort Alexander Indian Band for two consecutive terms. Upon completion of his mandate, he and his family moved to the Yukon, where he was a Regional Director General with the Department of Indian Affairs.

== Political career ==
In 1981, Fontaine graduated from the University of Manitoba with a Bachelor of Arts degree in political studies. After graduation, he worked for the Southeast Resource Development Council as a special advisor to the tribal council, which was followed by his election to the position of Manitoba’s vice-chief for the Assembly of First Nations. Fontaine was one of the Manitoba First Nation leaders who led the opposition of the Meech Lake Accord.

The Aboriginal Residential Schools Truth and Reconciliation Commission credits Fontaine for placing the issue of residential schools on the national agenda when in October 1990 he spoke publicly about the abuse that he and his fellow students had experienced at the Fort Alexander school. The next year, in 1991, he was elected grand chief of the Assembly of Manitoba Chiefs and served for three consecutive terms.

In 1997, he was elected National Chief of the Assembly of First Nations for the first time. Following his first term as national chief, Fontaine was appointed chief commissioner of the Indian Claims Commission. Under his term the land claim of the Kahkewistahaw First Nation was resolved, resulting in a $94.6 million agreement for the Saskatchewan band. Fontaine resigned from the ICC in 2003 in order to run for national chief once again.

In July 2003, Fontaine was elected to his second term as National Chief of the Assembly of First Nations. He ran again and was re-elected in July 2006 with almost 76 percent of the vote, defeating Bill Wilson of British Columbia. He was re-elected in 2006 on the basis of the "Getting Results" agenda, which proved to be successful. In his third term, Fontaine said that he would attempt to bring the $5 billion Kelowna Accord negotiated in 2005 with the Liberal government of Paul Martin back to the table. The deal, aimed at improving living conditions and education for Aboriginal people, was cancelled by the succeeding Conservative government.

In 2005, Fontaine successfully negotiated the Indian Residential Schools Settlement Agreement, leading to a financial contribution of more than $5 billion to survivors and programs for them. The IRSSA, which includes a Truth and Reconciliation Commission, was ratified by the federal Conservative government in May 2006. In the same year, Fontaine was recognized as number one of the Top 50 list of Capital People of 2005 selected by Ottawa Life Magazine.

In June 2007, Fontaine, Prime Minister Harper, and Indian Affairs Minister Jim Prentice announced a process to establish an independent tribunal to adjudicate Specific Land Claims.

In 2009, he had a meeting with Pope Benedict XVI in order to obtain an apology for abuses that occurred in First Nations schools during the 20th century.

Since September 1, 2009, Fontaine acts as "Special Advisor" to the Royal Bank of Canada. His mandate is to "provide advice and counsel to RBC's Canadian businesses to help the company deepen its relationships with Aboriginal governments, communities, and businesses in Canada".

On March 29, 2010, Fontaine joined Norton Rose OR LLP (formerly Ogilvy Renault) as Senior Advisor and advises Canadian and international clients with First Nations matters, including Aboriginal law, energy, environmental and mining and resources.

He was made an officer of the Order of Canada on December 30, 2012.

In 2014, he was heckled by a group of Indigenous protestors at the University of Winnipeg due to his support for the Trans Mountain pipeline.

== Awards and honorary degrees ==
- National Aboriginal Achievement Award, now the Indspire Awards (1996)
- Honorary Doctorate of Laws from Royal Military College of Canada (1999)
- Honorary Doctorate of Laws from Brock University (2004)
- Member of the Order of Manitoba (2004)
- Honorary Doctorate of Laws from University of Windsor (2005)
- Honorary Doctorate of Laws from Lakehead University (2005)
- Honorary Doctorate of Laws from University of Winnipeg (2008)
- Honorary Doctorate of Laws from University of Western Ontario (2010)
- Honorary Doctorate of Laws from University of Guelph (2010)
- Honorary Doctorate of Laws from Queen's University at Kingston (2010)
- Honorary Doctorate of Laws from Carleton University (2013)
- Honorary Doctorate of Laws from University of Toronto (2017)
- Honorary Doctorate of Laws from University of New Brunswick (2010)

== Personal life ==
In 1967 Fontaine married Janet Spence. They have two children, Maya and Michael. Fontaine's current partner is Kathleen Mahoney.

Fontaine's nephew, Jerry Fontaine, served as chief of the Sagkeeng Nation from 1989 to 1998, and was a prominent Aboriginal leader in Manitoba. Another nephew is Tim Fontaine, a former journalist and now comedy writer who created the satirical Walking Eagle News in 2017.
