= Assembly of First Nations =

First Nations organization in Canada

- Assemblée des Premières Nations (French)
- AFN Logo
- Abbreviation: AFN
- Formation: Developed from the NIB beginning in 1978, eventually holding its first meeting in April 1982 in Penticton, British Columbia.
- Headquarters: Ottawa, Ontario, Canada
- Region served: Canada
- Official language: English, French
- National Chief: Cindy Woodhouse
- Website: www.afn.ca

The Assembly of First Nations (French: Assemblée des Premières Nations, AFN) is an assembly of Canadian First Nations (Indian bands) represented by their chiefs. Established in 1982 and modelled on the United Nations General Assembly, it emerged from the National Indian Brotherhood, which dissolved in the late 1970s.

The aims of the organization are to protect and advance the aboriginal and treaty rights and interests of First Nations in Canada, including health, education, culture and language. It represents primarily status Indians.

The Métis and non-status Indians have organized in the same period as the Congress of Aboriginal Peoples (CAP). Reflecting changes in where Aboriginal peoples are living, it represents primarily urban Indians, including off-reserve status Indians and Inuit.

== History ==
Indigenous peoples of North America have created varieties of political organizations. Examples preceding European contact include the Blackfoot Confederacy, Powhatan Confederacy. There were other confederacies in the Southeast British colonies. Other groups formed later to enter into treaties with colonial governments led by ethnic French, Spanish and English.

During the late 19th and early 20th centuries, a number of regional Indigenous organizations were formed in Canada, such as the Grand Indian Council of Ontario and Quebec, and the Allied Tribes of B.C. After World War II, additional provincial and territorial organizations were founded and continued to expand their memberships in an effort to assert their rights to land and to protect their cultures.

Indigenous activists under the leadership of controversial lawyer William Wuttunee from Red Pheasant First Nation founded the National Indian Council (NIC) in 1961 to represent their peoples of Canada, including treaty/status Indians, non-status Indians, and the Métis, though not the Inuit, who took a different path. This organization, however, collapsed in 1967 as the three groups failed to achieve consensus on their positions.

In February 1968, Chief Andrew Delisle stated the need for a collective and unified Indian voice, first on a regional and provincial basis, and then on a national level. In March, eight provincial leaders of Indian organizations from Nova Scotia to British Columbia gathered to form the Canadian Indian Brotherhood. At a meeting in Winnipeg in April attended by more than 2000 status Indians and Metis from BC to New Brunswick, a meeting of the newly-formed Canadian National Indian Brotherhood was called for in May with the objective of consolidating all Indian and Metis tribes and Bands into a national brotherhood.

Following the Canadian government's publication of its 1969 White Paper, in 1970 George Manuel, Noel Doucette, Andrew Delisle, Omer Peters, Jack Sark, David Courchene, Roy Sam, Harold Sappier, David Ahenakew, Harold Cardinal, and Roy Daniels founded and incorporated the National Indian Brotherhood. It was intended as an umbrella organization for the various provincial and territorial organizations of status Indians, such as the Indian Association of Alberta.

The Métis and non-status Indians set up a separate organization in 1971, known as the Native Council of Canada (NCC). It originally was made up of regional and provincial associations of these peoples. By the late 20th century, an increasing number of Aboriginal peoples were living in urban areas. With further development and led by Jim Sinclair, in 1993 it became the Congress of Aboriginal Peoples (CAP), representing urban and off-reserve Métis, non-status and status Indians. It also represents some Inuit.

=== National Indian Brotherhood ===
The National Indian Brotherhood (NIB) was a national political body made up of the leadership of the various provincial and territorial organizations (PTOs); it lobbied for changes to federal and provincial policies to support Indigenous rights and sovereignty.

The following year, the NIB launched its first major campaign, which opposed the assimilationist proposals of the 1969 White Paper. In that, the Minister of Indian Affairs, Jean Chrétien, had proposed abolition of the Indian Act, rejection of Aboriginal land claims, and assimilation of First Nations people into the Canadian population, with the status of other ethnic minorities, who were largely descendants of immigrants, rather than as a distinct group reflecting Indigenous peoples history in North America.

Supported by a churches, labour, and other citizen groups, the NIB mounted massive opposition to the government plan. On June 3, 1970, the NIB presented the response by Harold Cardinal and the Indian Chiefs of Alberta (entitled "Citizens Plus" but commonly known as "The Red Paper") to Prime Minister Pierre Trudeau and ministers of his Cabinet. Startled by the strong opposition to the White Paper, the Prime Minister told the delegation that the White Paper recommendations would not be imposed against their will.

In 1972, the NIB submitted their policy paper Indian Control of Indian Education to the federal government, which generally accepted this proposal to devolve control of Indigenous education to the bands and reserves. The NIB gained national recognition on the issue of Indigenous education in Canada. Their work contributed to the government's ending the Canadian Residential School System, which had been long opposed by Indigenous people. It was also a first step in the push for Indigenous self-governance.

In 1973, the Calder case decision was issued. "You have more rights than I thought you did," Prime Minister Trudeau told the NIB leaders.

The NIB gained consultative status with the United Nations Economic and Social Council in 1974, until such time as an international Indigenous organization could be formed. When the World Council of Indigenous Peoples was formed on Nuu-chah-nulth territory the following year, under the leadership of George Manuel, it took the place of the NIB at the United Nations.

=== Shift toward representation for chiefs ===
The NIB began to have its own tensions. Individual chiefs and regional groupings begin to chafe because their only access to the national scene was through their respective PTOs. The chiefs complained they were not being heard.

In 1978, in an effort to enable more opinions to be heard, NIB President Noel Starblanket organized an "All Chiefs Conference" on Indian Self-Government. The Chiefs were delighted with the opportunity. At a second All Chief Conference, the Chiefs announced that the All Chief Conference would be "the one and only voice of Indian people in Canada."

That same year Prime Minister Trudeau announced that Canada would patriate its constitution; essentially take over its governance. NIB and other groups questioned what would happen to the Treaty and aboriginal rights that had been guaranteed by the Imperial Crown, if Canada took over its own governance. They believed that strong national leadership from the Chiefs was essential. The Chiefs formalized their governance structure, compromised by incorporating a "Confederacy" composed largely of the NIB leadership, and made the NIB, an incorporated body, its administrative secretariat. They used the United Nations General Assembly as a model in conceiving how the new Assembly of First Nations would be structured and operate.

The Chiefs held their first assembly as "the Assembly of First Nations" (AFN) in Penticton, British Columbia, in April 1982. The new structure gave membership and voting rights directly to individual chiefs representing First Nations, rather than to representatives of their provincial/territorial organizations. This structure was adopted in July 1985, as part of the Charter of the Assembly of First Nations.

== Public perceptions ==
The AFN depends upon the federal government for most of its funding. First Nations activists have sometimes accused it of being obsequious to the government as a result, and not sufficiently representative of the larger First Nations community. But there is also widespread Indigenous support for continued operation of the AFN.

In early 2013, the press reported that documents revealed that the AFN had been operating together with the Royal Canadian Mounted Police (RCMP) to provide information and conduct surveillance on members of First Nations communities. This was in response to their joint concerns over disruptions due to mass protests over issues of sovereignty, land claims, and related tensions. Reporters acquired the documents through access to information requests. The Star reported that heads of the RCMP, and of the Ontario and Quebec provincial police met in the summer of 2007 with AFN national chief Phil Fontaine to "facilitate a consistent and effective approach to managing Aboriginal protests and occupations."

== Principal organs ==
- National Chief (elected for a three-year term)
- First Nations-in-Assembly
- The executive committee (National Chief and regional chiefs from each province and territory)
- Secretariat
- Advisory councils
  - Council of Elders
  - Women's Council
  - Youth Council
  - Veterans' Council
  - 2SLGBTQQIA+

== Presidents of the National Indian Brotherhood ==
- 1968–1970 – Walter Dieter
- 1970–1976 – George Manuel
- 1976–1980 – Noel Starblanket
- 1980–1982 – Delbert Riley

== National Chiefs of the Assembly of First Nations ==
- 1982–1985: David Ahenakew
- 1985–1991: Georges Erasmus
- 1991–1997: Ovide Mercredi
- 1997–2000: Phil Fontaine
- 2000–2003: Matthew Coon Come
- 2003–2009: Phil Fontaine
- 2009–2014: Shawn Atleo
- 2014: Ghislain Picard (interim)
- 2014–2021: Perry Bellegarde
- 2021–2023: RoseAnne Archibald
- 2023: Joanna Bernard (interim)
- 2023–present: Cindy Woodhouse

== See also ==
- Assembly of First Nations leadership conventions
- Congress of Aboriginal Peoples
- Assembly of First Nations Quebec-Labrador
