= St. Catherine's Chapel (Massey College) =

Chapel Royal in Toronto, Canada

The Chapel Royal at Massey College
- Gi-Chi-Twaa Gimaa Nini Mississauga Anishinaabek AName Amik (Ojibwe)
- Arms of the Chapel Royal at Massey College

Religion
- Affiliation: Interfaith
- Designation: Chapel Royal

Location
- Location: Massey College
- Municipality: Toronto, Ontario
- Country: Canada
- Interactive map of The Chapel Royal at Massey College
- Coordinates: 43°39′52″N 79°23′51″W

Architecture
- Architect: Tanya Moiseiwitsch
- Founder: Vincent Massey
- Established: 1963; 63 years ago

The Chapel Royal at Massey College (Ojibwe: Gi-Chi-Twaa Gimaa Nini Mississauga Anishinaabek AName Amik, lit. ''The King's Anishinaabek Sacred Place''), also known as St. Catherine's Chapel, is the chapel of Massey College, a graduate residential college at the University of Toronto on its St. George campus.

Founded in 1963, it was made the third Chapel Royal in Canada by Queen Elizabeth II in 2017. It is the first ecumenical and interfaith worship space to be given the designation.

== History ==
When Vincent Massey, 18th Governor of General of Canada, founded Massey College in 1963, he insisted that the college have a chapel. The master plan and buildings of the college were designed by Ronald Thom, but the design of the chapel was entrusted to Tanya Moiseiwitsch, stage designer for the Stratford Festival. Moiseiwitsch's designs were inspired by a 19th-century Russian chapel. In 2005-2006, the firm of Shim-Sutcliffe carried out a renovation of the chapel, adding a white oak ceiling. The chapel features white oak furniture designed by David Linley, son of Princess Margaret.

The chapel features art from various Canadian and Indigenous artists such as Sarah Hall, as well as various 16th and 17th century Russian Orthodox icons.

== The King's Anishinaabek Sacred Place (Chapel Royal) ==
The The King’s Anishinaabek Sacred Place is a Chapel Royal located within Massey College at the University of Toronto in Toronto, Ontario, Canada. Established originally as the college chapel when Massey College opened in 1963, it evolved from a Christian interdenominational space into a unique multifaith institution dedicated to worship, reflection, dialogue, and Indigenous-Crown reconciliation. In 2017, it was created a Chapel Royal by Her Majesty Queen Elizabeth II, becoming the third Chapel Royal in Canada and the first in the world to possess an explicitly multifaith foundation. The other two, the Mohawk Chapel in Brantford and Christ Church Royal Chapel located on the Tyendinaga Mohawk Territory, are associated with the Mohawk people, making this the first associated with the Anishinaabe.

The chapel maintains a special relationship with the Mississaugas of the Credit First Nation, on whose traditional territory it stands. It also possesses an Indigenous name adopted by the nation, translated as The King's Anishinaabek Sacred Place.

The chapel was given the Anishinaabemowin name Gi-Chi-Twaa Gimaa Kwe Mississauga Anishinaabek Aname Gamik (The Queen's Anishinaabek Sacred Place), since 8 September 2023, it has been known as Gi-Chi-Twaa Gimaa Nini Mississauga Anishinaabek AName Amik (The King's Anishinaabek Sacred Place).

=== History ===
In 2012, members of the college community began discussing how the chapel could contribute to growing national conversations regarding reconciliation with Indigenous peoples. John Fraser, then Head of Massey College, was encouraged to establish a relationship with the Mississaugas of the Credit First Nation.

To explore possible future directions, the college consulted educator and historian Nathan Tidridge. A committee of senior and junior fellows studied Canada's existing Mohawk Chapels Royal, namely His Majesty's Royal Chapel of the Mohawks in Brantford, Ontario, and Christ Church Chapel Royal in Deseronto, Ontario. The committee explored the possibility of establishing Massey's chapel as a third Indigenous Chapel Royal connected to the Mississaugas of the Credit.

Consultations were subsequently held with the Canadian Crown and vice-regal offices. The college was advised on the process for petitioning Queen Elizabeth II, through the office of the Governor General of Canada, to create a new Chapel Royal. By the time the proposal was finalized, Fraser's successor, Hugh Segal, had joined the initiative. The request proposed that the chapel remain not only interdenominational but also explicitly multifaith. According to the project organizers, this represented the first request of its kind submitted to the Sovereign.

Approval for the designation was proclaimed on National Indigenous Peoples Day in 2017. The chapel became the Chapel Royal at Massey College, a development intended to commemorate both Canada's sesquicentennial and the Treaty of Niagara (1764) which extended the Covenant Chain into the Great Lakes region.

=== Activities and significance ===
Since its creation, the King's Anishinaabek Sacred Place has played an important role in fostering relationships between First Nations, the Sovereign and their representatives. In 2019, it hosted a historic "Council at the Chapel Royal" that brought together all of Canada's vice-regal representatives to hear an address by Perry Bellegarde, National Chief of the Assembly of First Nations. A commemorative plaque was later installed near the chapel entrance.

The chapel has also revived the protocol of presenting ceremonial tobacco from the Sovereign and vice-regal representatives to First Nations dignitaries. The first Chapel Royal Tobacco Beds were planted in Waterdown, Ontario, located in the centre of the Treaty territory of the Mississaugas of the Credit First Nation. Chapel Royal Tobacco, used by vice-regal offices across Canada, was personally planted at the college by Prince Edward, Duke of Edinburgh, during a visit in 2023. A tobacco badge was approved by Queen Elizabeth II to mark tobacco grown on behalf the chapel royal, and has since become a shared symbol among Canada's Indigenous Chapels Royal.

In partnership with the Chapel Royal at St James's Palace in London, the chapel has facilitated diplomatic missions by the Mississaugas of the Credit First Nation to the United Kingdom in 2023 and 2025. Both delegations included audiences with King Charles III, described as the first meetings between the Mississaugas and the Sovereign in more than 160 years.

During the 2023 audience in Scotland, Gimaa (Chief) Stacey Laforme presented the King with a replica of the Silver Covenant Chain Wampum. Following its acceptance, the wampum was housed at St James's Palace before installation within the Chapel Royal at Massey College, further emphasizing the chapel's role in commemorating the historic Indigenous-Crown relationship and reinforcing it as Canada’s only monument to the Treaty of Niagara.

== Arms ==
The chapel was granted a coat of arms by the College of Arms on October 9, 1964, which it shares with Massey College.

Coat of arms of The Chapel Royal at Massey College
Notes Granted October 9, 1964, by the College of Arms Escutcheon Argent on a chevron between three lozenges Sable each charged with a fleur-de-lis Argent, three stags’ heads erased Or, a canton Azure charged with the crest of the Royal Arms of Canada, all within a bordure Sable charged with four flames Or; Symbolism "These are the arms of the Right Honourable Vincent Massey, a former Governor General of Canada, within a border set with flames symbolizing knowledge. Massey initiated the idea for the college and provided for its endowment through the Massey Foundation."

== See also ==
- Mohawk Chapel
- Christ Church Royal Chapel
- Monarchy of Canada and the Indigenous peoples of Canada
