= Monarchy of Canada and the Indigenous peoples of Canada =

Association between the Canadian Crown and the Indigenous peoples of Canada

The association between the monarchy of Canada and Indigenous peoples in Canada began with the first interactions between North American Indigenous peoples and European colonialists and, over centuries of interface, treaties were established concerning the monarch and Indigenous nations. First Nations, Inuit, and Métis peoples in Canada have a unique relationship with the reigning monarch and, like the Māori and the Treaty of Waitangi in New Zealand, generally view the affiliation as being not between them and the ever-changing Cabinet, but instead with the continuous Crown of Canada, as embodied in the reigning sovereign.

These agreements with the Crown are administered by Canadian Aboriginal law, overseen by the minister of Crown–Indigenous relations, and expressed through numerous meetings and ceremonies, as well as exchanges of gifts and honours, involving Indigenous leaders, the monarch, viceroy or viceroys, and other members of the Canadian royal family.

== Relations ==
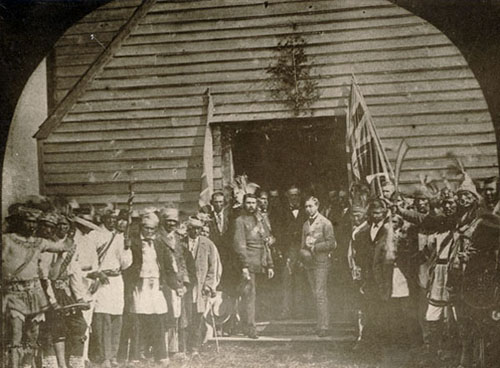
Prince Arthur with the Chiefs of the Six Nations at the Mohawk Chapel, Brantford, 1869

The association between Indigenous peoples in Canada and the Canadian Crown is both statutory and traditional, the treaties being seen by the first peoples both as legal contracts and as perpetual and personal promises by successive reigning kings and queens to protect the welfare of Indigenous peoples, define their rights, and reconcile their sovereignty with that of the monarch in Canada. This was reinforced by the Supreme Court's ruling in Guerin v the Queen in 1985. The agreements are formed with the Crown, not the government, because the monarchy is thought to have inherent stability and continuity, as opposed to the transitory nature of populist whims that rule the political government, meaning the link between monarch and Indigenous peoples in Canada will theoretically last for "as long as the sun shines, grass grows, and rivers flow".

The relationship has thus been described as mutual—"cooperation will be a cornerstone for partnership between Canada and First Nations, wherein Canada is the short-form reference to Her Majesty the Queen in Right of Canada"—and "special", having a strong sense of "kinship" and possessing familial aspects. Constitutional scholars have observed that First Nations are "strongly supportive of the monarchy", even if not necessarily regarding the monarch as supreme. (Note: In a speech given sometime between 1812 and 1817, Chief Peguis of the Ojibwa stated that even King George III, though he was called the Great Father, was below the Great Spirit and could not claim the lands of the spirit as his own.) The nature of the legal interaction between Canadian sovereign and First Nations has similarly not always been supported. (Note: The 1969 White Paper proposed that Aboriginal peoples in Canada be recognised by the Crown in the same fashion as non-native Canadians; a notion that was opposed by Status Indians but later supported by the Reform Party of Canada, which viewed the special treaty rights as racist.)

=== Definition ===
The Office that I hold represents the Canadian Crown. As we are all aware the Crown has a fiduciary responsibility for the ongoing well being of Canada's First Citizens.

— Lieutenant Governor of British Columbia Iona Campagnolo, 2005

While treaties were signed between European monarchs and First Nations in North America as far back as 1676, the only ones that survived the American Revolution are those in Canada, which date to the beginning of the 18th century. Today, the main guide for relations between the monarchy and Canadian First Nations is King George III's Royal Proclamation of 1763. Though not a treaty, it is regarded by First Nations as their Magna Carta or "Indian Bill of Rights", binding on not only the British Crown, but, the Canadian one, as well, as the document remains a part of the Canadian constitution. The proclamation set parts of the King's North American realm aside for colonists and reserved others for the First Nations, thereby affirming native title to their lands and making clear that, under the sovereignty of the Crown, the Aboriginal bands were autonomous political units in a "nation-to-nation" association with non-native governments, with the monarch as the intermediary.

This created a "constitutional and moral basis of alliance" between Indigenous Canadians and the Canadian state as personified in the monarch, (Note: but also a fiduciary affiliation in which the Crown is constitutionally charged with providing certain guarantees to the First Nations,) as affirmed in Sparrow v. The Queen, meaning that the "honour of the Crown" is at stake in dealings between it and First Nations leaders. The Crown's governmental representatives therefore must act in good faith in matters relating to Indigenous peoples, predominantly via a duty to consult and accommodate whenever Indigenous peoples' rights and interests might be involved. The duty derives "from the Crown's assertion of sovereignty in the face of prior Aboriginal occupation" and is "not a mere incantation, but, rather, a core precept that finds its application in concrete practices", and "cannot be interpreted narrowly or technically".

Given the "divided" nature of the Crown, the sovereign may be party to relations with Indigenous Canadians distinctly within a provincial jurisdiction. (Note: For instance, while section VI.91.24 of the Constitution Act, 1867, gives responsibility for "Indians and lands reserved for the Indians" to the monarch in right of Canada, the 1929 Manitoba Natural Resources Transfer Agreement shifted to the monarch in right of Manitoba some of the aforementioned responsibility for setting aside provincial Crown land to satisfy the sovereign's treaty obligations.) This has, at times, led to a lack of clarity regarding which of the monarch's jurisdictions should administer his or her duties towards Indigenous peoples. (Note: The Constitution Act, 1867, gave the Crown in right of Quebec authority over lands and resources within the boundaries of the province, subject to "interest other than that of the province in the same", and it was commonly held that First Nations' title was such an interest. Yet, as early as 1906, federal treaty negotiators were explaining to the Algonquin in Quebec that it was only the Crown in right of Canada that could ratify treaties. Consequently, since Confederation, the Queen of Canada-in-Council has permitted the Lieutenant Governor of Quebec-in-Council to guide settlement and development of Algonquin lands. This arrangement has led to criticism from First Nations leaders of the sovereign's exercise of her duties in Quebec.)

Lieutenant Governor of British Columbia Judith Guichon put a strong focus on the interaction of the Crown with Indigenous peoples, which she believed needs to be defined by "respect, relationships, and responsibility," and stating that the Canadian Crown is central to the treaty relationship. Guichon also drew a parallel between monarchy and Indigenous culture, elaborating, "monarchs have a role somewhat like hereditary chiefs and elders in the First Nations communities. The monarch in our constitutional monarchy represents sober second thought and wisdom, not the next political cycle, but, rather, enduring truths and the historical evolution of our nation through generations."

=== Expressions ===
This stone was taken from the grounds of Balmoral Castle [...] a place dear to my great-great-grandmother, Queen Victoria. It symbolises the foundation of the rights of First Nations peoples reflected in treaties signed with the Crown during her reign. [I] hope that it will serve as a reminder of the special relationship between the sovereign and all First Nations peoples.

— Elizabeth II, Queen of Canada, 2005

Wampum belts were made to mark agreements with the Crown, "serving as important records of an understanding between parties." In 2019, Queen Elizabeth II was given a replica of the Two Row Wampum (Kaswentha), which symbolized an agreement between the Iroquois and representatives of the Dutch Crown in 1613, which formed the foundation of the Covenant Chain of later treaties with the English Crown. The parallel rows of purple beads "represent two groups living in harmony—each following their own path, without forcing their customs or laws on one another."

From time to time, the link between the Crown and Indigenous peoples will be symbolically expressed, through pow-wows or other types of ceremony held to mark the anniversary of a particular treaty—sometimes with the participation of the monarch, another member of the Canadian royal family, or one of the sovereign's representatives (Note: For instance, in 1999, the Lieutenant Governor of New Brunswick and representatives of the Maliseet First Nation were involved in a ceremony marking the restoration of Old Government House in New Brunswick as a royal and viceregal residence, reflecting the participation of their ancestors in the original dedication ceremony on New Year's Day, 1826.)—or simply an occasion mounted to coincide with the presence of a member of the royal family on a royal tour, Indigenous peoples having always been a part of such tours of Canada. Gifts have been frequently exchanged (Note: An example being the occasion as when the Squamish people's Capilano Indian Community Club of North Vancouver in 1953 gave the Duke of Edinburgh a walking stick in the form of a totem pole.) and titles have been bestowed upon royal and viceregal figures since the early days of Indigenous contact with the Crown.

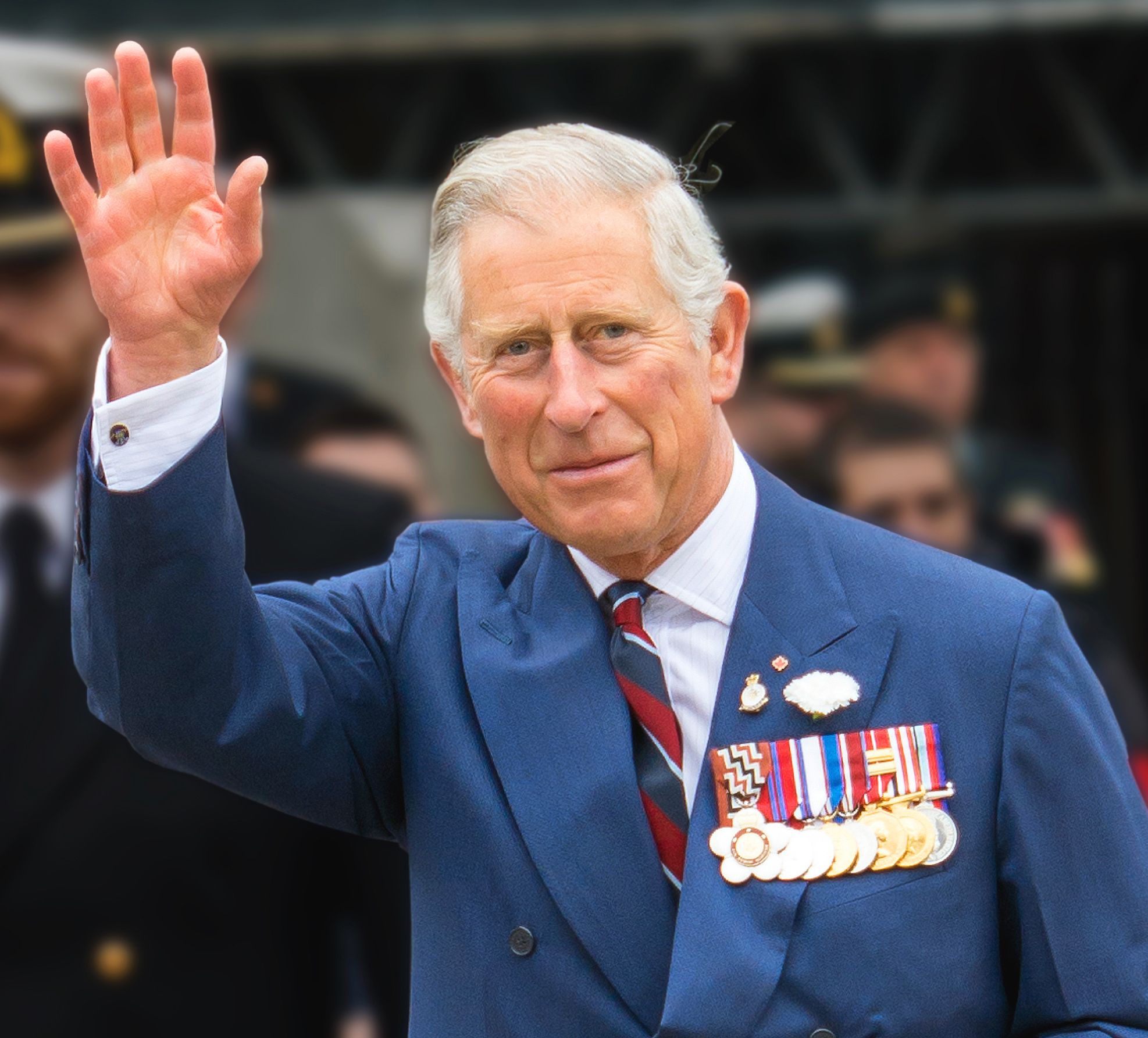
King Charles III as Prince of Wales, in Halifax, 2014. He was named Attaniout Ikeneego by the Inuit of Nunavut, Leading Star by the Ojibwa of Winnipeg, and Kīsikāwipīsimwa miyo ōhcikanawāpamik by the Cree of Saskatchewan.

Since as early as 1710, Indigenous leaders have met to discuss treaty business with royal family members or viceroys in private audience and many continue to use their connection to the Crown to further their political aims. The above-mentioned pageants and celebrations have, for instance, been employed as a public platform on which to present complaints to the monarch or other members of the royal family. It has been said that Aboriginal people in Canada appreciate their ability to do this witnessed by both national and international cameras. (Note: Innu leader Mary Pia Benuen said in 1997: "The way I see it, she is everybody's queen. It's nice for her to know who the Innu are and why we're fighting for our land claim and self-government all the time.")

King Charles III, when Prince of Wales, made Chief Perry Bellegarde an advisor on the development of Charles' Sustainable Markets Initiative, which Bellegarde stated in 2023, "has shown that he is prepared to listen to and learn from Indigenous peoples" and that the King had incorporated Indigenous knowledge systems and rights into his efforts to partner industry, technology, and government together to combat climate change.

== History ==
=== French and British crowns ===
Explorers commissioned by French and English monarchs made contact with Indigenous peoples in North America in the late 15th and early 16th centuries. These interactions were generally peaceful—the agents of each sovereign seeking alliances with Indigenous leaders in wresting territories away from the other monarch—and the partnerships were typically secured through treaties. The Iroquois were among the first to do so, forming the Two Row Wampum Treaty with the Dutch Crown in 1613, which, after the English took New Netherland in 1674, formed the basis of the Covenant Chain of agreements with the English Crown, begun in 1676.

However, the English also used friendly gestures as a vehicle for establishing Crown dealings with Indigenous peoples, while simultaneously expanding their colonial domain: as fur traders and outposts of the Hudson's Bay Company (HBC), a crown corporation founded in 1670, spread westward across the continent, they introduced the concept of a just, paternal monarch to "guide and animate their exertions", to inspire loyalty, and promote peaceful relations. During the fur trade, before the British Crown was considering permanent settlement, marital alliances between traders and Indigenous women were a form of alliance between Indigenous peoples and the Crown. When a land settlement was being planned by the Crown, treaties become the more official and permanent form of relations. They also brought with them images of the English monarch, such as the medal that bore the effigy of King Charles II (founder of the HBC) and which was presented to native chiefs as a mark of distinction; these medallions were passed down through the generations of the chiefs' descendants and those who wore them received particular honour and recognition at HBC posts.

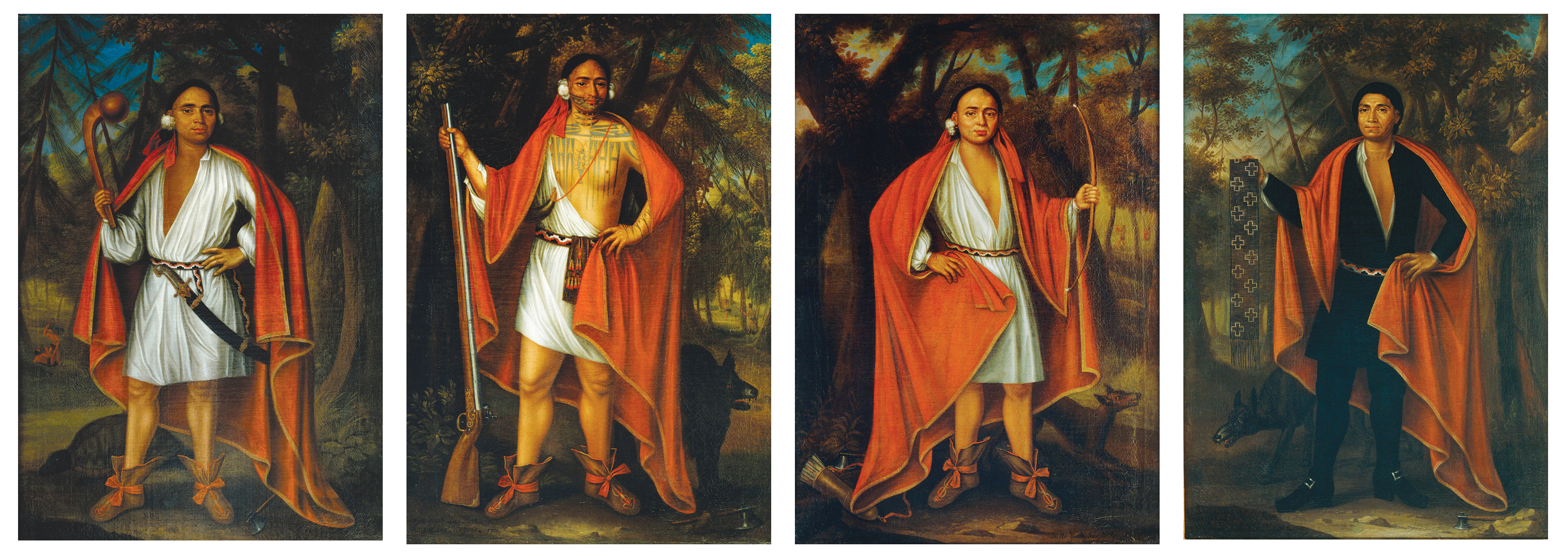
Portraits of the Four Mohawk Kings, painted in 1710, during their visit with Queen Anne

The Great Peace of Montreal was in 1701 signed by the Governor of New France, representing King Louis XIV, and the chiefs of 39 First Nations. Then, in 1710, Indigenous leaders were visiting personally with the British monarch; in that year, Queen Anne held an audience at St. James' Palace with three Mohawk—Sa Ga Yeath Qua Pieth Tow of the Bear Clan (called Peter Brant, King of Maguas), Ho Nee Yeath Taw No Row of the Wolf Clan (called King John of Canojaharie), and Tee Yee Ho Ga Row, or "Double Life", of the Wolf Clan (called King Hendrick Peters)—and one Mahican Chief—Etow Oh Koam of the Turtle Clan (called Emperor of the Six Nations). The four, dubbed the Four Mohawk Kings, were received in London as diplomats, being transported through the streets in royal carriages and visiting the Tower of London and St. Paul's Cathedral. But, their business was to request military aid for defence against the French, as well as missionaries for spiritual guidance. The latter request was passed by Anne to the Archbishop of Canterbury, Thomas Tenison, and a chapel was eventually built in 1711 at Fort Hunter, near present-day Johnstown, New York, along with the gift of a reed organ and a set of silver chalices in 1712.

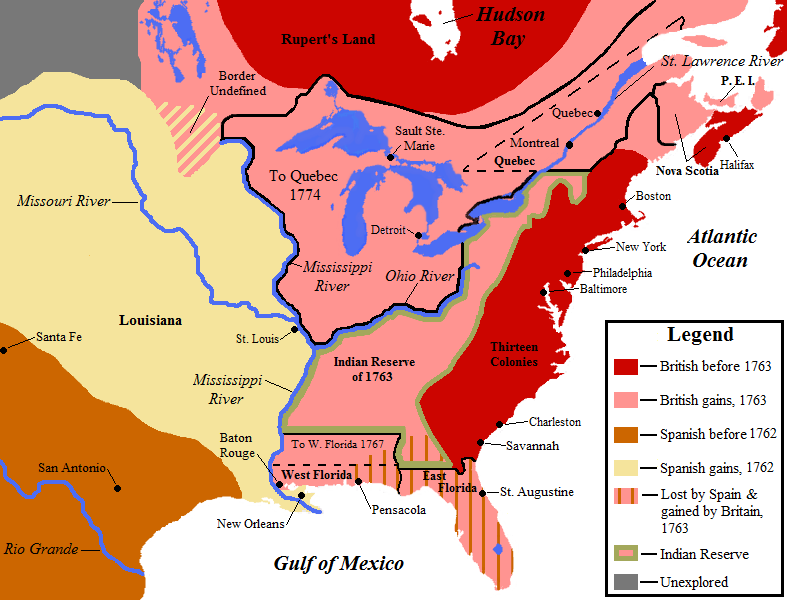
Map of the North American Eastern Seaboard as divided by the Royal Proclamation of 1763. Treaty of Paris gains in pink, and Spanish territorial gains after the Treaty of Fontainebleau in yellow. (Note: The above graphic mistakenly shows King George III's "Indian Reserve" as only south of the Ohio River after the expansion of Quebec in 1774. In fact, the reserve territory north of the Ohio remained part of the reserve, but under the administration and legal regime of Quebec.)

Both British and French monarchs viewed their lands in North America as being held by them in totality, including those occupied by First Nations. Typically, the treaties established delineations between territory reserved for colonial settlement and that distinctly for use by Indigenous peoples. The French kings, though they did not admit claims by Indigenous peoples to lands in New France, granted the natives reserves for their exclusive use; for instance, from 1716 onwards, land north and west of the manorials on the St. Lawrence River were designated as the pays d'enhaut (upper country), or "Indian country", and were forbidden to settlement and clearing of land without the expressed authorisation of the King. The same was done by the kings of Great Britain; for example, the Friendship Treaty of 1725, which ended Dummer's War, established a relationship between King George III and the "Maeganumbe ... tribes Inhabiting His Majesty's Territories" in exchange for the guarantee that the indigenous people "not be molested in their persons ... by His Majesty's subjects". The British contended that the Treaty gave them title to Nova Scotia and Acadia, while Acadians and the Mi'kmaq opposed further British settlement in the territory. The Mi'kmaq would later make peace with the British at the signing of the Halifax Treaties.

=== History of colonization ===
The colonization of land, people, culture and bodies was a result of settler colonial actions in the process of resource extraction and the settlement of the land. An example of this colonization is the imposing of European femininity onto Indigenous women. As Indigenous women adopted Christianity, mostly voluntarily, the social status of Indigenous women changed. Colonialism was an arm of the crown and its history still influences the Canadian government's policies regarding Indigenous peoples in the country. The Indian Act's exclusion of women from maintaining their own status for example, was a government-enforced policy that was amended in 1985 with Bill C31.

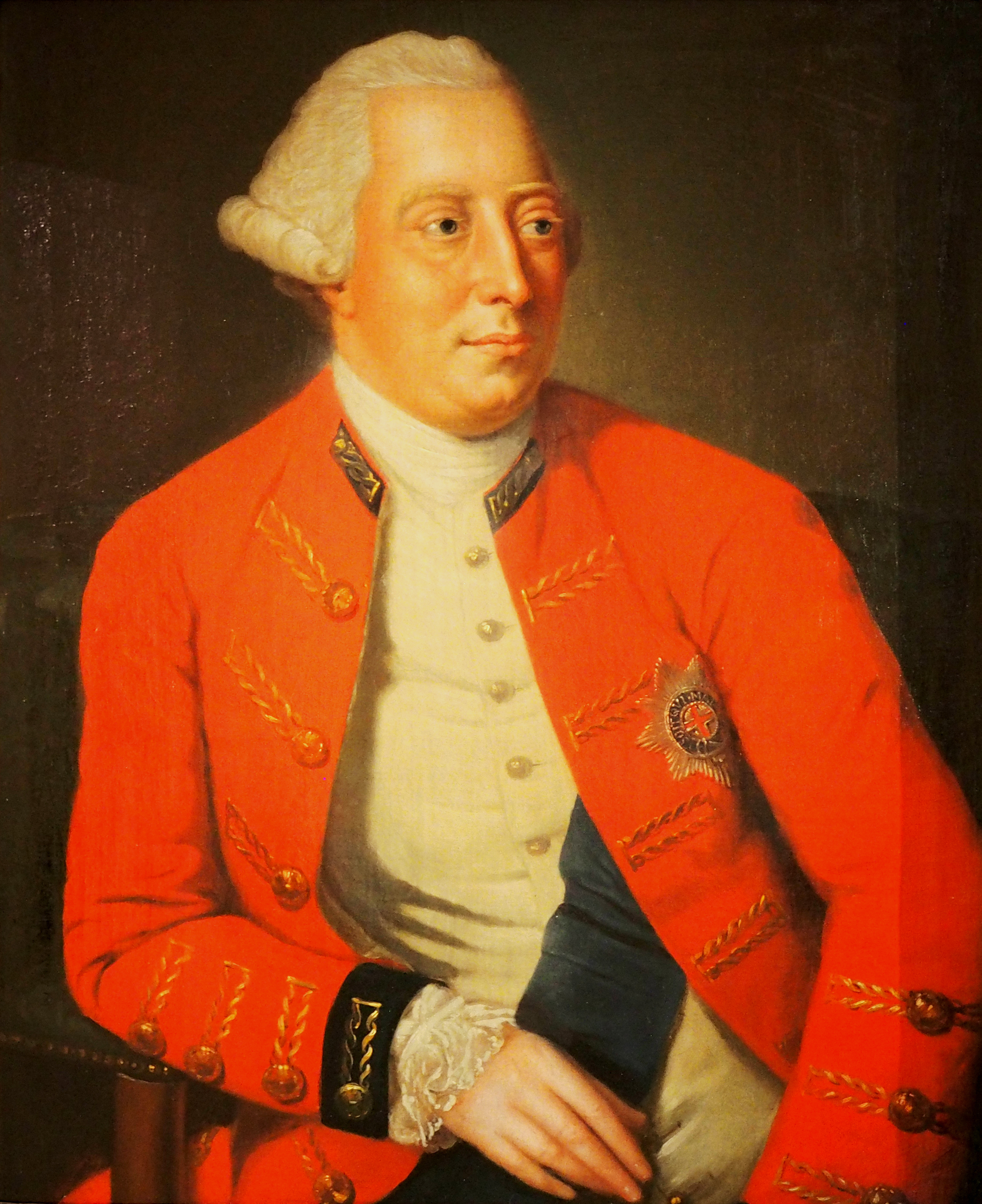
King George III

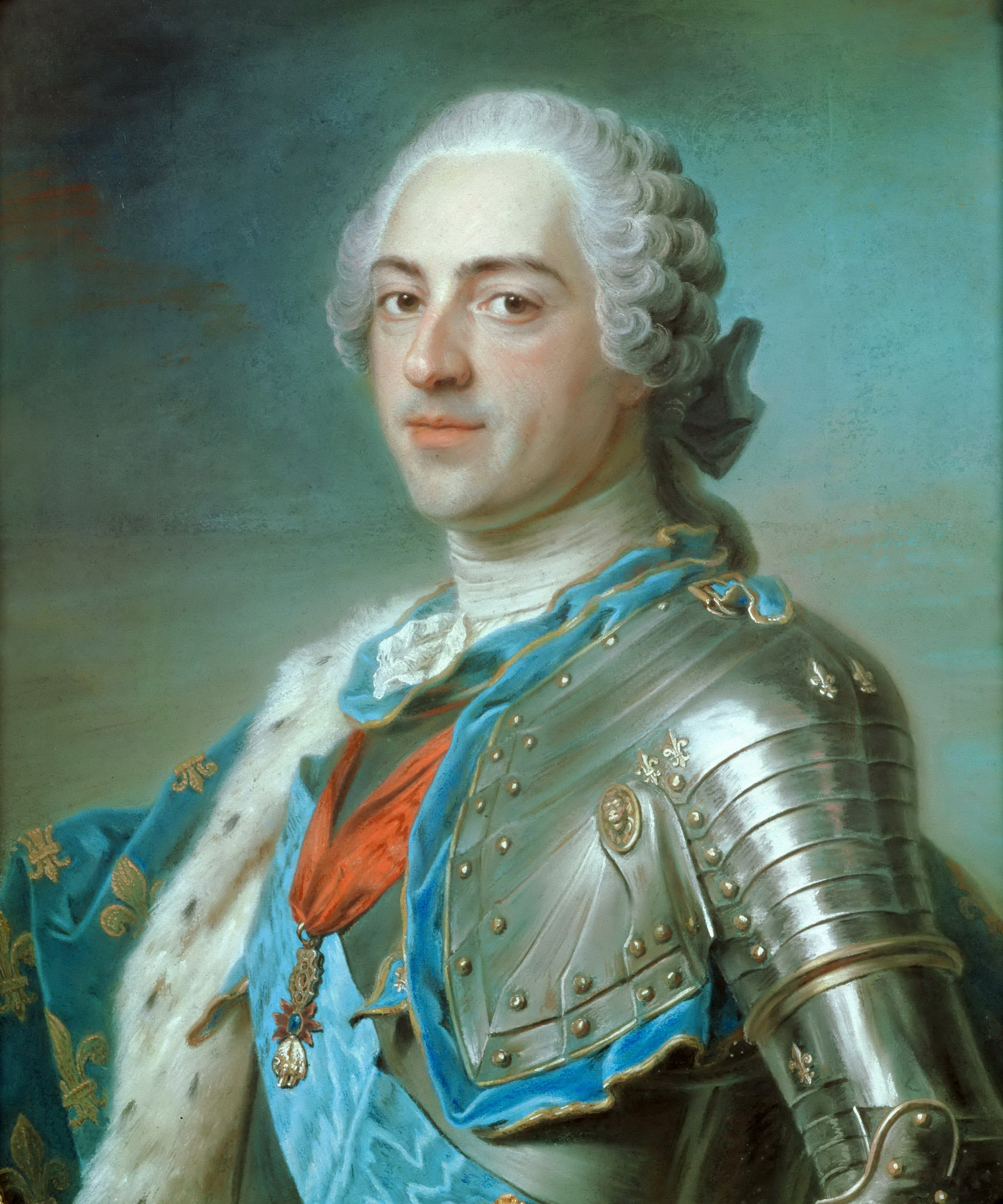
King Louis XV

The sovereigns also sought alliances with the First Nations; the Iroquois siding with Georges II and III and the Algonquin with Louis XIV and XV. These arrangements left questions about the treatment of Aboriginals in the French territories once the latter were ceded in 1760 to George III. Article 40 of the Capitulation of Montreal, signed on 8 September 1760, inferred that First Nations peoples who had been subjects of King Louis XV would then become the same of King George: "The Savages or Indian allies of his most Christian Majesty, shall be maintained in the Lands they inhabit; if they chose to remain there; they shall not be molested on any pretence whatsoever, for having carried arms, and served his most Christian Majesty; they shall have, as well as the French, liberty of religion, and shall keep their missionaries". Yet, two days before, the Algonquin, along with the Hurons of Lorette and eight other tribes, had already ratified a treaty at Fort Lévis, making them allied with, and subjects of, the British king, who instructed General the Lord Amherst to treat the First Nations "upon the same principals of humanity and proper indulgence" as the French, and to "cultivate the best possible harmony and Friendship with the Chiefs of the Indian Tribes". The retention of civil code in Quebec, though, caused the relations between the Crown and First Nations in that jurisdiction to be viewed as dissimilar to those that existed in the other Canadian colonies.

In 1763, George III issued a royal proclamation that acknowledged the First Nations as autonomous political units and affirmed their title to their lands; it became the main document governing the parameters of the relationship between the sovereign and Indigenous subjects in North America. The King thereafter ordered Sir William Johnson to make the proclamation known to Indigenous nations under the King's sovereignty and, by 1766, its provisions were already put into practical use. (Note: In that year, the Imperial Privy Council endorsed a grant of 20,000 acres (81 km^{2}) to Joseph Marie Philibot at a location of his choosing, but Philibot's request for land on the Restigouche River was denied by the Governor of Quebec on the grounds that "the lands so prayed to be assigned are, or are claimed to be, the property of the Indians and as such by His Majesty's express command as set forth in his proclamation in 1763, not within their power to grant".) In the prelude to the American Revolution, native leader Joseph Brant took the King up on this offer of protection and voyaged to London between 1775 and 1776 to meet with George III in person and discuss the aggressive expansionist policies of the American colonists.

However, even as the Treaty of Niagara was being negotiated, the King's powers were being constrained by the development of constitutional monarchy and responsible government; what Walter Bagehot called the "dignified crown" (the monarch him- or herself) and the "efficient crown" (the ministers of the Crown, usually drawn from and accountable to the elected chamber of parliament, using the sovereign's powers). This constitutional evolution continued through the reigns of George IV, William IV, and Victoria, but without consultation with, or obtaining the consent of, the First Nations bound in treaty with the Crown.

=== After the American Revolution ===
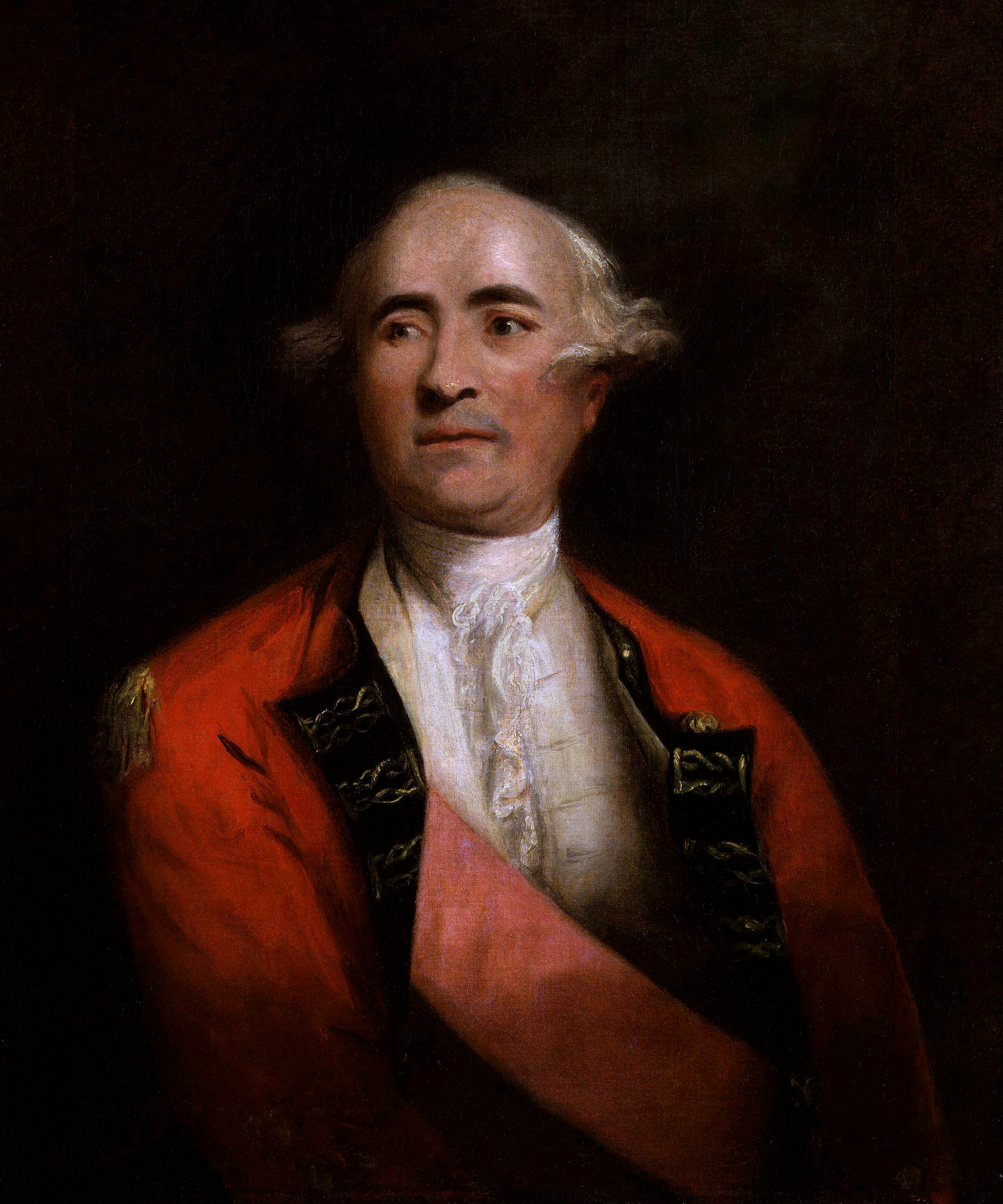
Frederick Haldimand, Governor of Quebec, who issued the Haldimand Proclamation in 1784

During the course of the American Revolution, First Nations assisted King George III's North American forces, who ultimately lost the conflict. As a result of the Treaty of Paris, signed in 1783 between King George and the American Congress of the Confederation, British North America was divided into the sovereign United States (US) and the still British Canadas, creating a new international border through some of those lands that had been set apart by the Crown for First Nations and completely immersing others within the new republic. As a result, some Indigenous nations felt betrayed by the King and their service to the monarch was detailed in oratories that called on the Crown to keep its promises, especially after nations that had allied themselves with the British sovereign were driven from their lands by Americans. New treaties were drafted and those Indigenous nations that had lost their territories in the United States, or simply wished to not live under the US government, were granted new land in Canada by the King.

The Mohawk Nation was one such group, which abandoned its Mohawk Valley territory, in present day New York State, after Americans destroyed the natives' settlement, including the chapel donated by Queen Anne following the visit to London of the Four Mohawk Kings. As compensation, George III promised land in Canada to the Six Nations and, in 1784, some Mohawks settled in what is now the Bay of Quinte and the Grand River Valley, where two of North America's only three chapels royal—Christ Church Royal Chapel of the Mohawks and Her Majesty's Chapel of the Mohawks—were built to symbolise the connection between the Mohawk people and the Crown. Thereafter, the treaties with Indigenous peoples across southern Ontario were dubbed the Covenant Chain and ensured the preservation of First Nations' rights not provided elsewhere in the Americas. This treatment encouraged the loyalty of the Indigenouos peoples to the sovereign and, as allies of the King, they aided in defending his North American territories, especially during the War of 1812; during which the Six Nations and Seven Nations fought to safeguard their territory and "win the Crown's support for long-term Indigenous interests—which included Indigenous sovereignty". (Though, the Indigenous allies were not permitted to send representatives to the negotiations for the Treaty of Ghent and, while the British tried to bargain for the creation of an Iroquoian state south of the Great Lakes, the American delegates refused to agree.)

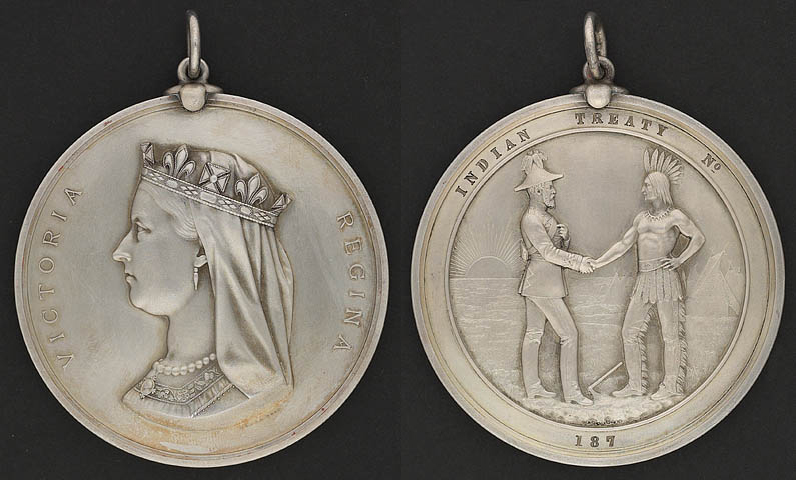
The Indian Chiefs Medal, presented to commemorate Treaties 3, 4, 5, 6, and 7, bearing the effigy of Queen Victoria

In 1860, during one of the first true royal tours of Canada, First Nations put on displays, expressed their loyalty to Queen Victoria, and presented concerns about misconduct on the part of the British Indian Department to the Queen's son, Prince Albert Edward, Prince of Wales, when he was in Canada West. In that same year, Nahnebahwequay of the Ojibwa secured an audience with the Queen. When Governor General John Campbell, Marquess of Lorne, and his wife, Princess Louise, a daughter of Queen Victoria, visited British Columbia in 1882, they were greeted upon arrival in New Westminster by a flotilla of local Indigenous peoples in canoes who sang songs of welcome before the royal couple landed and proceeded through a ceremonial arch built by Indigenous people, which was hung with a banner reading "Clahowya Queenastenass", Chinook Jargon for "Welcome Queen's Child". The following day, the Marquess and Marchioness gave their presence to an event attended by thousands of First Nations people and at least 40 chiefs. One presented the Princess with baskets, a bracelet, and a ring of Aboriginal make and Louise said in response that, when she returned to the United Kingdom, she would show these items to the Queen.

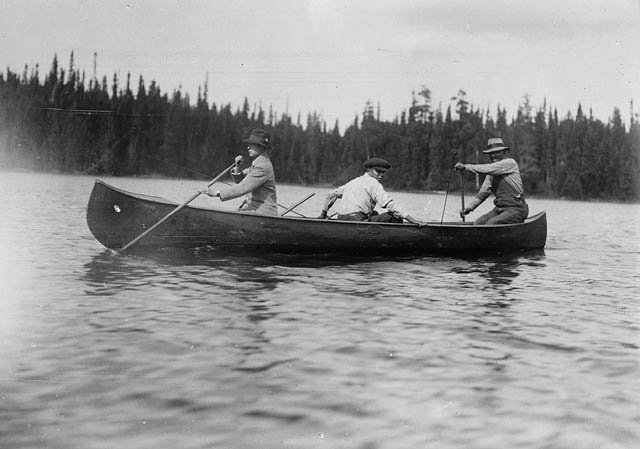
Prince Edward, Prince of Wales, with two Ojibwe guides canoe on the Nipigon River, in Ontario

In 1870, Britain transferred what remained of Rupert's Land from the Hudson's Bay Company to Canada and colonial settlement expanded westward. More treaties were signed between 1871 and 1921, wherein the Crown brokered land exchanges that granted the Indigenous societies reserves and other compensation, such as livestock, ammunition, education, health care, and certain rights to hunt and fish. The treaties did not ensure peace: as evidenced by the North-West Rebellion of 1885, sparked by Métis people's concerns over their survival and discontent on the part of Cree people over unfairness in the treaties signed with Queen Victoria.

=== Independent Canada ===
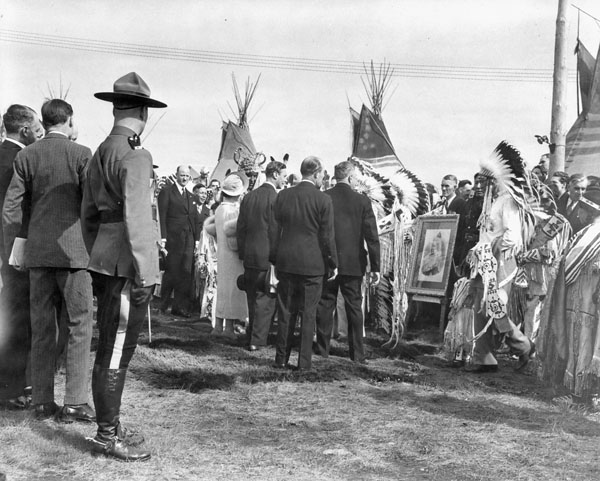
King George VI and Queen Elizabeth meet with Nakoda chieftains, who display an image of the King's great-grandmother, Queen Victoria, in Calgary, 1939.

Following Canada's legislative independence from the United Kingdom (codified by the Statute of Westminster, 1931) relations—both statutory and ceremonial—between sovereign and First Nations continued unaffected as the British Crown in Canada morphed into a distinctly Canadian monarchy. Indeed, during the 1939 tour of Canada by King George VI and Queen Elizabeth—an event intended to express the new independence of Canada and its monarchy—First Nations journeyed to city centres like Regina, Saskatchewan, and Calgary, Alberta, to meet with the King and present gifts and other displays of loyalty. In the course of the Second World War that followed soon after George's tour, more than 3,000 First Nations and Métis Canadians fought for the Canadian Crown and country, some receiving personal recognition from the King, such as Tommy Prince, who was presented with the Military Medal and, on behalf of the President of the United States, the Silver Star by the King at Buckingham Palace.

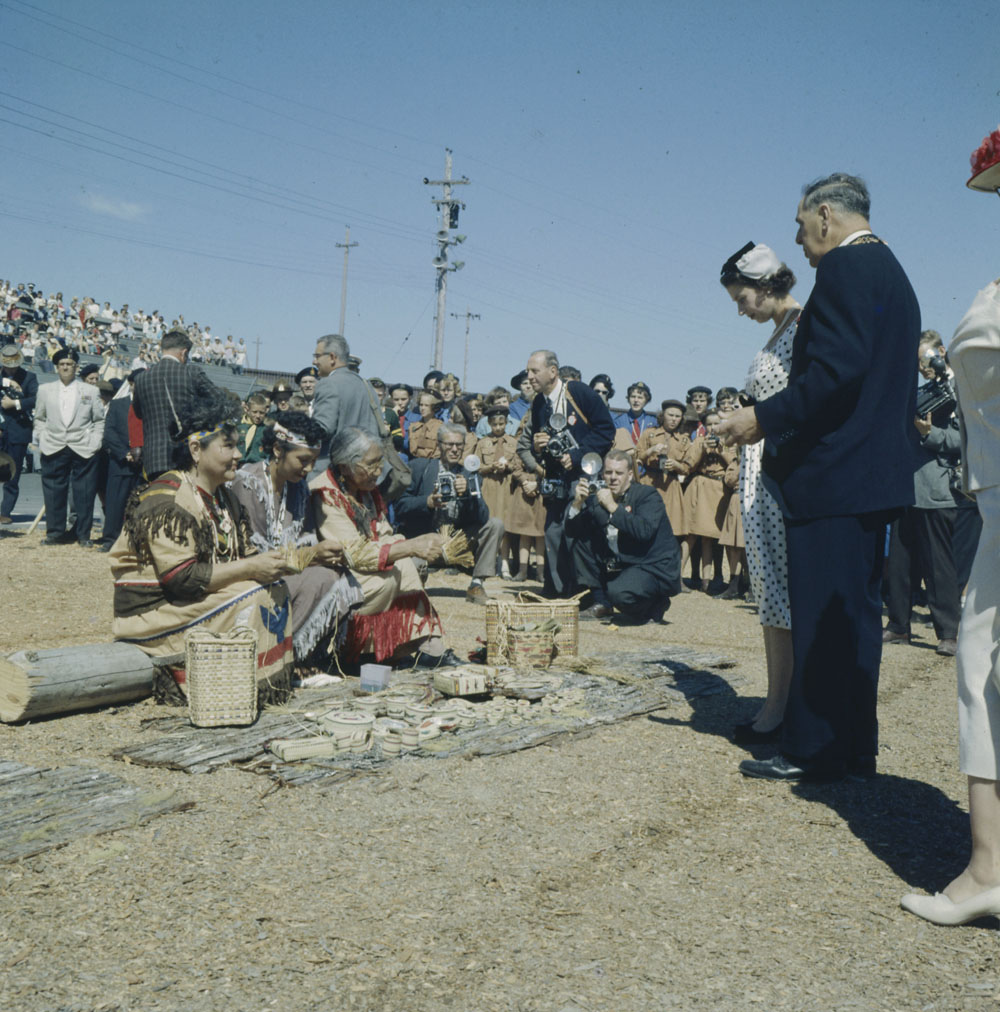
Queen Elizabeth II observing basket weaving by First Nations women

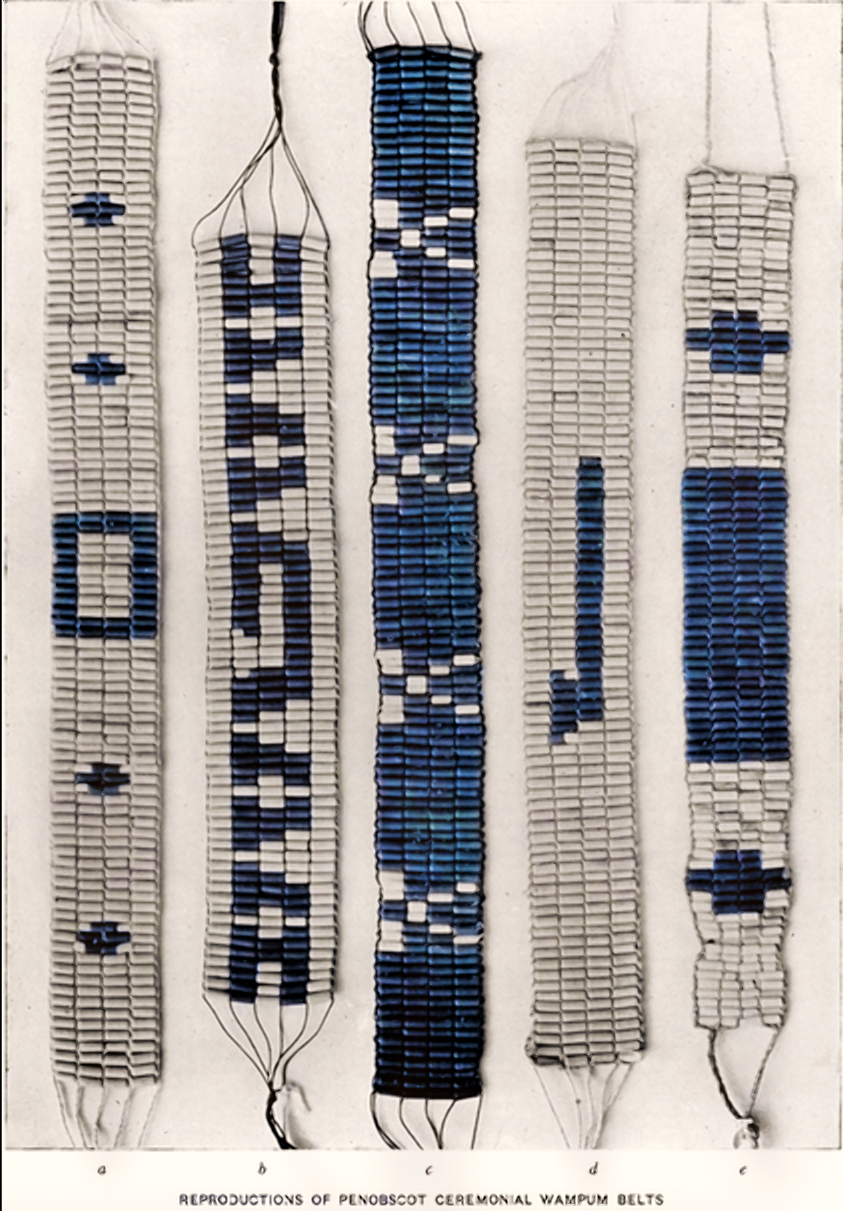
Examples of wampum

King George's daughter, Elizabeth, acceded to the throne in 1952. Squamish Nation Chief Joe Mathias was amongst the Canadian dignitaries who were invited to attend her coronation in London the following year. In 1959, the Queen toured Canada and, in Labrador, she was greeted by the Chief of the Montagnais and given a pair of beaded moose-hide jackets; at Gaspé, Quebec, she and her husband, the Duke of Edinburgh, were presented with deerskin coats by two local Indigenous people; and, in Ottawa, a man from the Kahnawake Mohawk Territory passed to officials a 200-year-old wampum as a gift for Elizabeth. It was during that journey that the Queen became the first member of the royal family to meet with Inuit representatives, doing so in Stratford, Ontario, and the royal train stopped in Brantford, Ontario, so that the Queen could sign the Six Nations Queen Anne Bible in the presence of Six Nations leaders. Across the prairies, First Nations were present on the welcoming platforms in numerous cities and towns, and at the Calgary Stampede, more than 300 Blackfoot, Tsuu T'ina, and Nakoda performed a war dance and erected approximately 30 teepees, amongst which the Queen and the Duke of Edinburgh walked, meeting with various chiefs. In Nanaimo, British Columbia, a longer meeting took place between Elizabeth and the Salish, wherein the latter conferred on the former the title of Mother of all People and, following a dance of welcome, the Queen and her consort spent 45 minutes (20 more than allotted) touring a replica First Nations village and chatting with some 200 people.

In 1970, Elizabeth II's presence at The Pas, Manitoba, provided an opportunity for the Opaskwayak Cree Nation to publicly express their perceptions of injustice meted out by the government. Then, during a royal tour by the Queen in 1973, Harold Cardinal delivered a politically charged speech to the monarch and the Queen responded, stating that "her government recognized the importance of full compliance with the spirit and intent of treaties"; the whole exchange had been pre-arranged between the two. The British High Commissioner to Canada at the time stated a Canadian official, likely Jean Chrétien, had said to him, "the monarchy and the fact that, on occasions, the Queen can talk directly to the native peoples, has helped to prevent in Canada anything like a direct confrontation similar to Wounded Knee". Still, during the same tour, Indigenous people were not always granted the personal time with the Queen that they desired; the meetings with First Nations and Inuit tended to be purely ceremonial affairs wherein treaty issues were not officially discussed. For instance, when Queen Elizabeth arrived in Stoney Creek, Ontario, five chiefs in full feathered headdress and a cortege of 20 braves and their consorts came to present to her a letter outlining their grievances, but were prevented by officials from meeting with the sovereign. In 1976, the Queen did receive First Nations delegations at Buckingham Palace, such as the group of Alberta Aboriginal Chiefs who, along with Lieutenant Governor of Alberta and Cree chief Ralph Steinhauer, held audience with the monarch there.

=== After constitutional patriation ===
In the prelude to the patriation of the Canadian constitution in 1982, some First Nations leaders campaigned for and some against the proposed move, many asserting that the federal ministers of the Crown had no right to advise the Queen that she sever, without consent from the First Nations, the treaty rights she and her ancestors had long granted to Indigenous Canadians. Worrying to them was the fact that their relationship with the monarch had, over the preceding century, come to be interpreted by Indian Affairs officials as one of subordination to the government—a misreading on the part of non-Aboriginals of the terms Great White Mother and her Indian Children. Indeed, First Nations representatives were locked out of constitutional conferences in the late 1970s, leading the National Indian Brotherhood (NIB) to make plans to petition the Queen directly. The Liberal Cabinet at the time, not wishing to be embarrassed by having the monarch intervene, extended to the NIB an invitation to talks at the ministerial level, though not the first ministers' meetings. But the invitation came just before the election in May 1979, which put the Progressive Conservative Party into Cabinet and the new ministers of the Crown decided to advise the Queen not to meet with the NIB delegation, while telling the NIB that the Queen had no power.

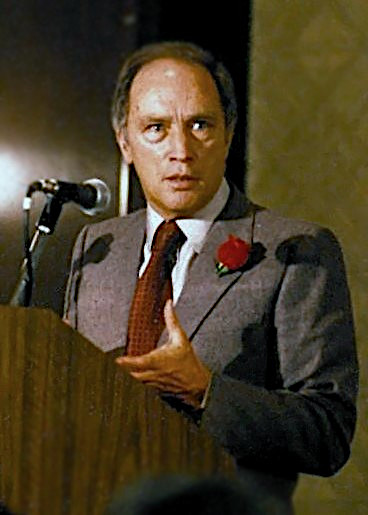
Pierre Trudeau at the Queen Elizabeth Hotel in Montreal, Québec, 1980

After another election on 18 February 1980, the Liberal Party won the plurality of seats in the House of Commons, leading Governor General Edward Schreyer to appoint Pierre Trudeau as prime minister, who advised the viceroy to appoint other Liberal Members of Parliament to Cabinet. On 2 October that year, Trudeau announced on national television his intention to proceed with unilateral patriation in what he termed the "people's package". However, the Union of British Columbia Indian Chiefs, led by President George Manuel, opposed the action due to the continued exclusion of Indigenous voices from consultations and forums of debate. To protest the lack of consultation and their concerns that the act would strip them of their rights and titles, the UBCIC organised the Indian Constitutional Express by chartering two trains that left Vancouver on 24 November 1980 for Ottawa. Upon arrival on 5 December, the "Constitution Express" was carrying approximately 1,000 people of all ages. Although Trudeau announced that he would extend the timetable for the Special Joint Committee on the Constitution to hear from Indigenous representatives, the leaders of the protest presented a petition and a bill of particulars directly to Schreyer. Unsatisfied with the response from the federal government, 41 people immediately continued on to the United Nations headquarters in New York City to gain international attention. Finally, they embarked for the Netherlands, Germany, France, and Belgium in 1981 to present the concerns and experiences of indigenous Canadians to an international audience. In November, they arrived in London, England, and petitioned the British parliament, eventually gaining audience with the House of Lords.

While no meeting with the Queen took place, the position of Indigenous Canadians was confirmed by Master of the Rolls the Lord Denning, who ruled that the relationship was indeed one between sovereign and First Nations directly, clarifying further that, since the Statute of Westminster was passed in 1931, the Canadian Crown had come to be distinct from the British Crown, though the two were still held by the same monarch, leaving the treaties sound. Upon their return to Canada, the NIB was granted access to first ministers' meetings and the ability to address the premiers. After extensive negotiations with Indigenous leaders, Trudeau agreed to their demands in late January 1982 and, therefore, introduced Section 35 of the Constitution Act, which officially reaffirmed Aboriginal rights.

Some 15 years later, the Governor General-in-Council, per the Inquiry Act, and on the advice of Prime Minister Brian Mulroney, established the Royal Commission on Aboriginal Peoples to address a number of concerns surrounding the relationship between Indigenous and non-Indigenous peoples in Canada. After 178 days of public hearings, visits by 96 communities, and numerous reviews and reports, the central conclusion reached was that "the main policy direction, pursued for more than 150 years, first by colonial, then by Canadian governments, has been wrong", focusing on the previous attempts at cultural assimilation. It was recommended that the nation-to-nation relationship of mutual respect be re-established between the Crown and First Nations, specifically calling for the monarch to "announce the establishment of a new era of respect for the treaties" and renew the treaty process through the issuance of a new royal proclamation as supplement to the Royal Proclamation of 1763. It was argued by Tony Hall, a professor of Native American studies at the University of Lethbridge, that the friendly relations between monarch and Indigenous Canadians must continue as a means to exercise Canadian sovereignty.

In 1994, while the Queen and her then-prime minister, Jean Chrétien, were in Yellowknife for the monarch to open the Northwest Territories Legislative Building, Bill Erasmus, the leader of the Dene community, used the opportunity to, in front of the nation's and world's cameras, present Elizabeth with a list of grievances over stalled land claim negotiations. Erasmus stated the Dene's relationship with the Crown was "tarnished and sullied" because the treaties had not been honoured. Though Chrétien gave a political reply, the Queen provided a more diplomatic response, acknowledging the controversies and stating, "you have your differences; linguistic, cultural, or geographical. May these differences long remain. But, may they never be cause for intolerance or give rise to acrimony."

Similarly, the Queen and Chrétien visited in 1997 the community of Sheshatshiu, in Newfoundland and Labrador, where the Innu people of Quebec and Labrador presented to the sovereign a letter of grievance over stagnant land claim talks. On both occasions, instead of giving the documents to the Prime Minister, as he was not party to the treaty agreements, they were handed by the chiefs to the Queen, who, after speaking with the First Nations representatives, then passed the list and letter to Chrétien for him and the other ministers of the Crown to address and advise her or her viceroy on how to proceed.

=== 21st century ===
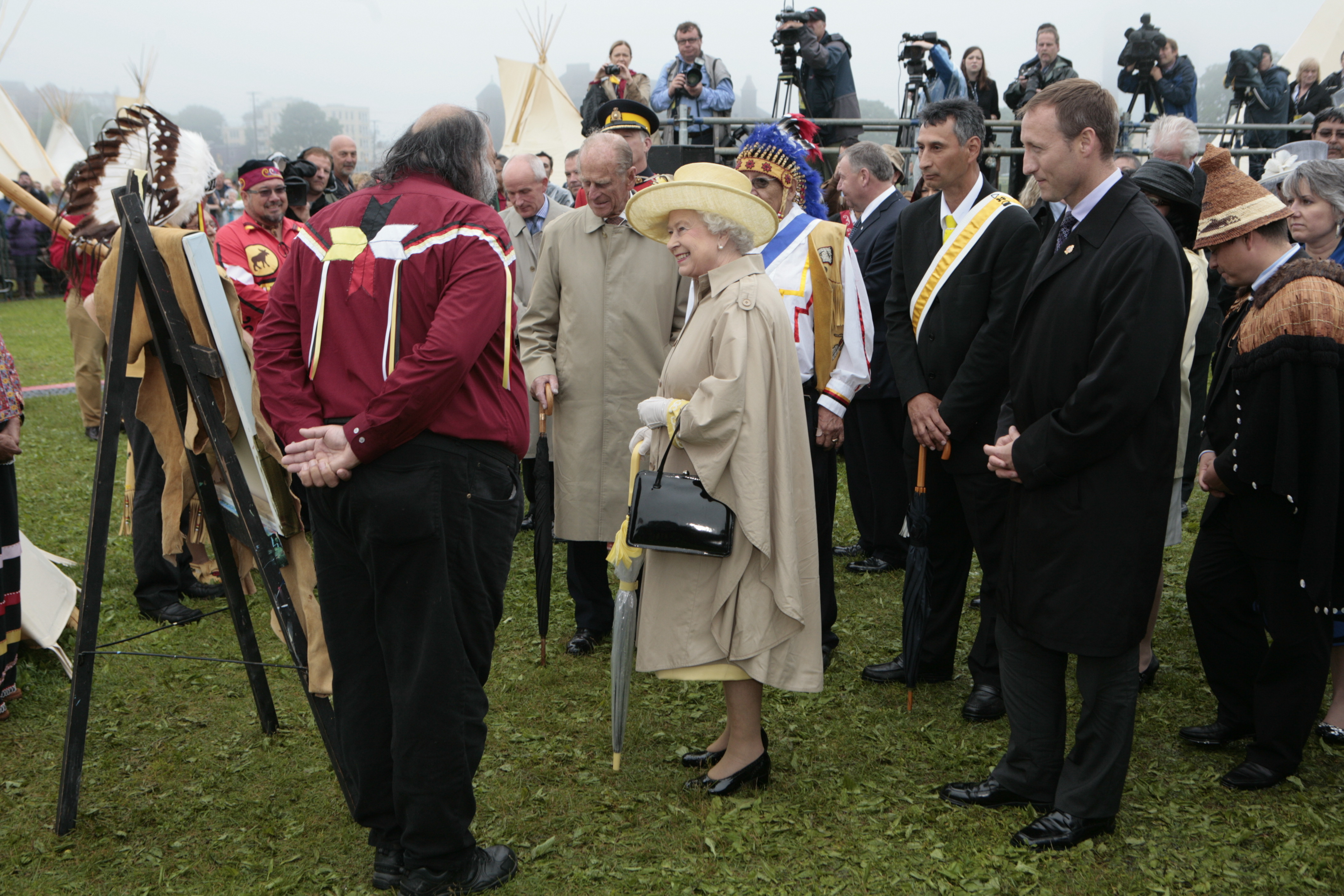
Presentation of Membertou Portrait by Alan Syliboy, to Queen Elizabeth II, 28 June 2010

During the visit of Queen Elizabeth II to Alberta and Saskatchewan in 2005, First Nations stated that they felt relegated to a merely ceremonial role, having been denied by federal and provincial ministers any access to the Queen in private audience. First Nations leaders have also raised concerns about what they see as a crumbling relationship between their people and the Crown, fueled by the failure of the federal and provincial cabinets to resolve land claim disputes, as well as a perceived intervention of the Crown into Indigenous affairs. Formal relations have also not yet been founded between the monarchy and a number of First Nations around Canada; such as those in British Columbia who are still engaged in the process of treaty making.

Portraits of the Four Mohawk Kings that had been commissioned while the leaders were in London had then hung at Kensington Palace for nearly 270 years, until Queen Elizabeth II in 1977 donated them to the Canadian Collection at the National Archives of Canada, unveiling them personally in Ottawa. That same year, the Queen's son, Charles, Prince of Wales, visited Alberta to attend celebrations marking the 100th anniversary of the signing of Treaty 7, when he was made a Kainai chieftain, and, as a bicentennial gift in 1984, Elizabeth II gave to the Christ Church Royal Chapel of the Mohawks a silver chalice to replace that which was lost from the 1712 Queen Anne set during the American Revolution.

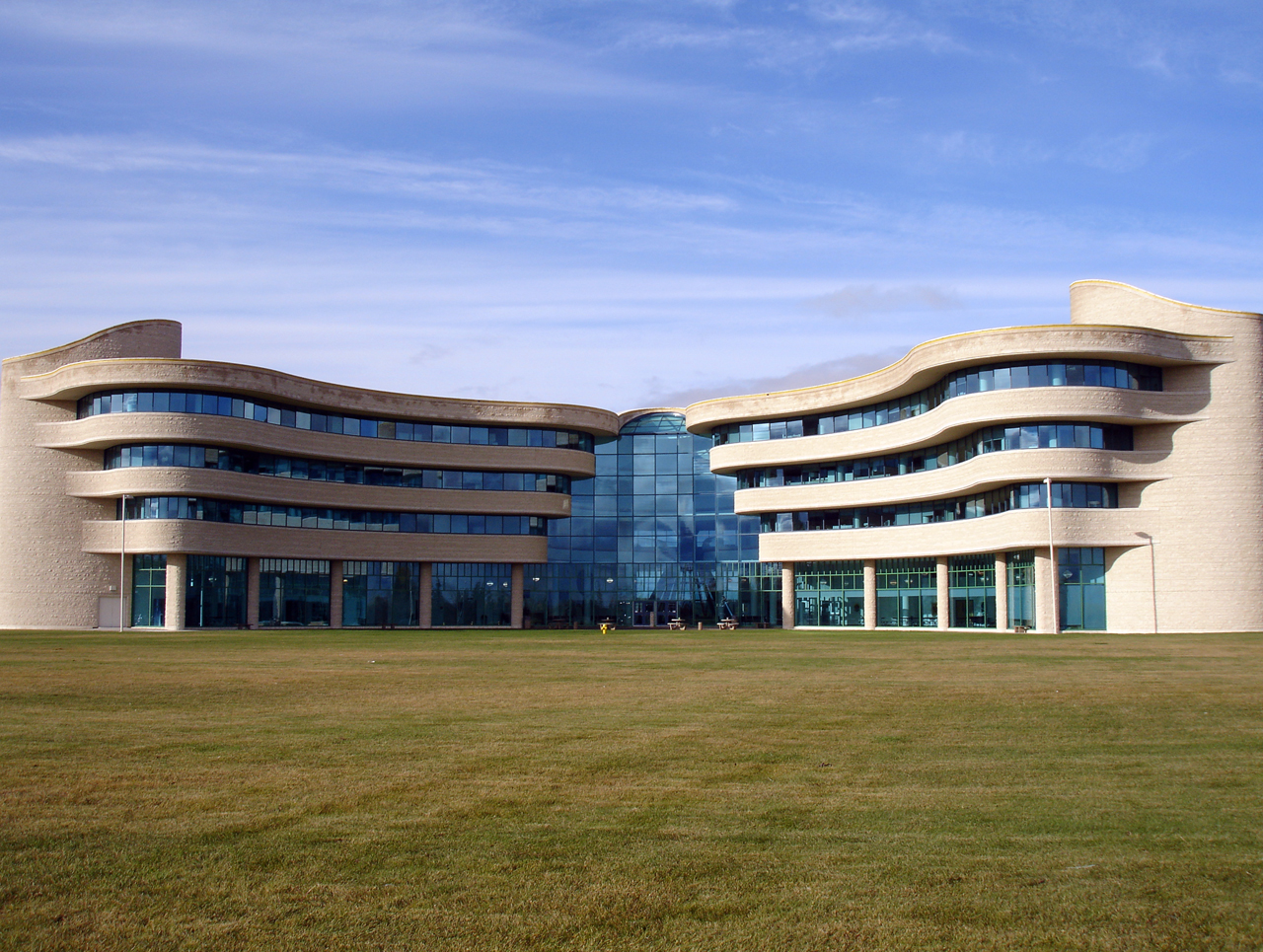
The Regina campus of the First Nations University of Canada, opened by Prince Edward, Earl of Wessex, and which contains a stone plaque donated by Queen Elizabeth II

In 2003, Elizabeth's other son, Prince Edward, Earl of Wessex, opened the Regina, Saskatchewan, campus of the First Nations University of Canada, where the Queen made her first stop during her 2005 tour of Saskatchewan and Alberta and presented the university with a commemorative granite plaque.

A similar scene took place at British Columbia's Government House, when, in 2009, Shawn Atleo, the National Chief of the Assembly of First Nations, presented Prince Charles, Prince of Wales, with a letter of complaint about the Crown's fulfillment of its treaty duties and requested a meeting with the Queen. Prince Charles then added another dimension to the relationship between the Crown and First Nations when, in a speech in Vancouver, he drew a connection between his own personal interests and concerns in environmentalism and the cultural practices and traditions of Canada's First Nations.

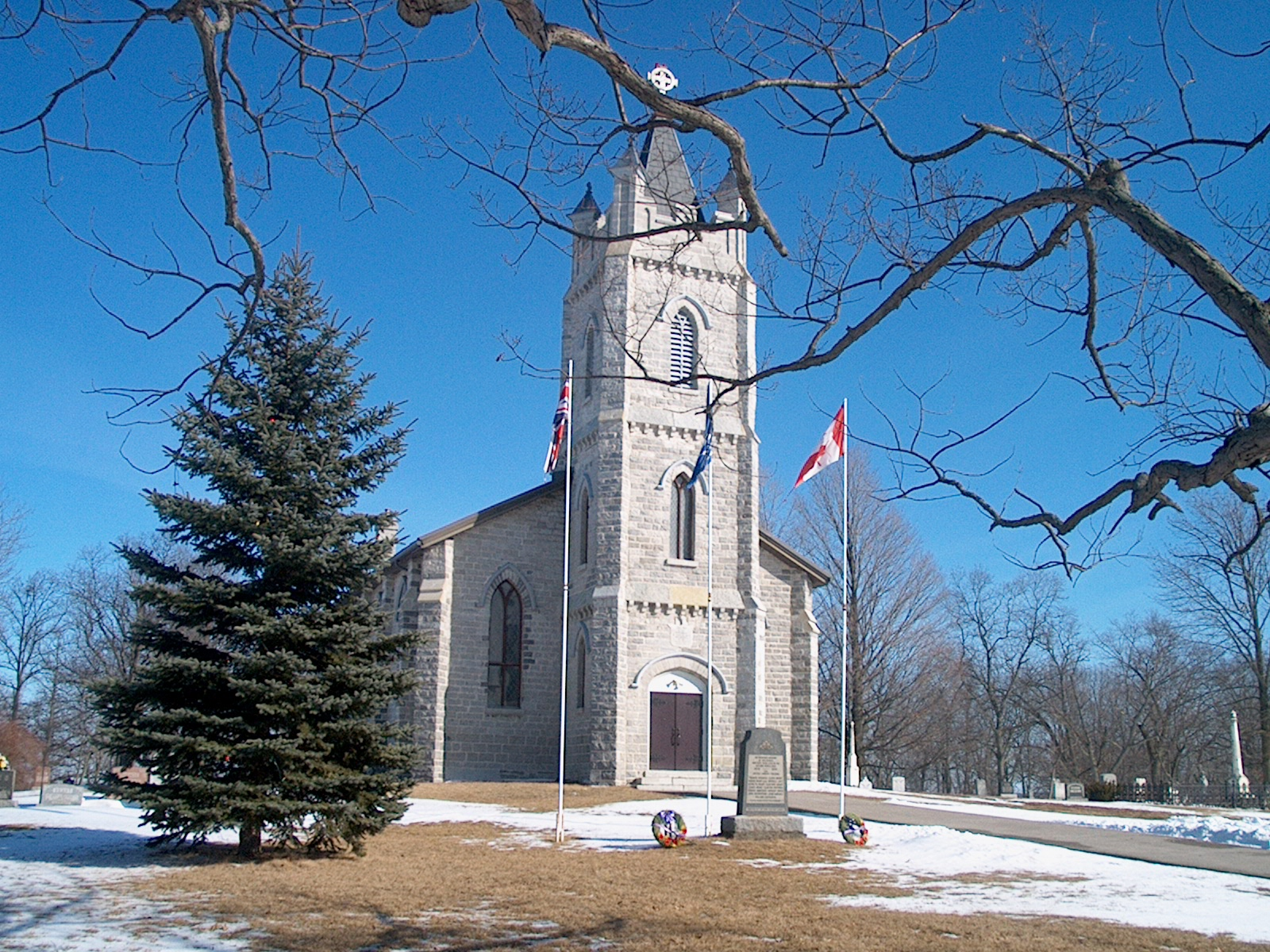
In 2010, the Christ Church Royal Chapel was presented sets of handbells from Queen Elizabeth II to symbolise the councils and treaties between the Iroquois Confederacy and the Crown.

Queen Elizabeth II gifted sets of handbells to both Her Majesty's Royal Chapel of the Mohawks and Christ Church Royal Chapel on 4 July 2010, to symbolise the councils and treaties between the Iroquois Confederacy and the Crown. The date was also symbolic, as 4 July is Independence Day in the United States, from where the Mohawk had been expelled by the Americans following their revolution against the Crown, which granted the Mohawk the territories in Canada on which the two chapels royal are built.

On the occasion of a tour of Canada by Prince Charles in 2012, the Canadian Broadcasting Corporation held a round-table discussion between Atleo; John Borrows, a constitutional scholar at the University of Minnesota and an Anishinabe from Ontario; Pamela Palmater, a lawyer and professor at Ryerson University and a Mi'kmaq from New Brunswick; and Taiaiake Alfred, a Mohawk from Kahnawake and a professor at the University of Victoria, asking them to reflect on the relationship between the Crown and First Nations. Alfred stated the Crown's promises to First Nations were binding on the Canadian state, but, Canada had broken all of the promises. Burrows opined that the honour of the House of Windsor should demand that Charles guarantee that the treaties be upheld. Palmater, speaking of Prince Charles, said, "he is the Crown [sic] and, given that it was the Crown who signed treaties and made promises and established the relationship with indigenous nations, he ought to assume some responsibility for making sure Canada carries out those obligations, which the [British] Crown unilaterally devolved to Canada without input from First Nations."

=== Protests and reconciliation ===
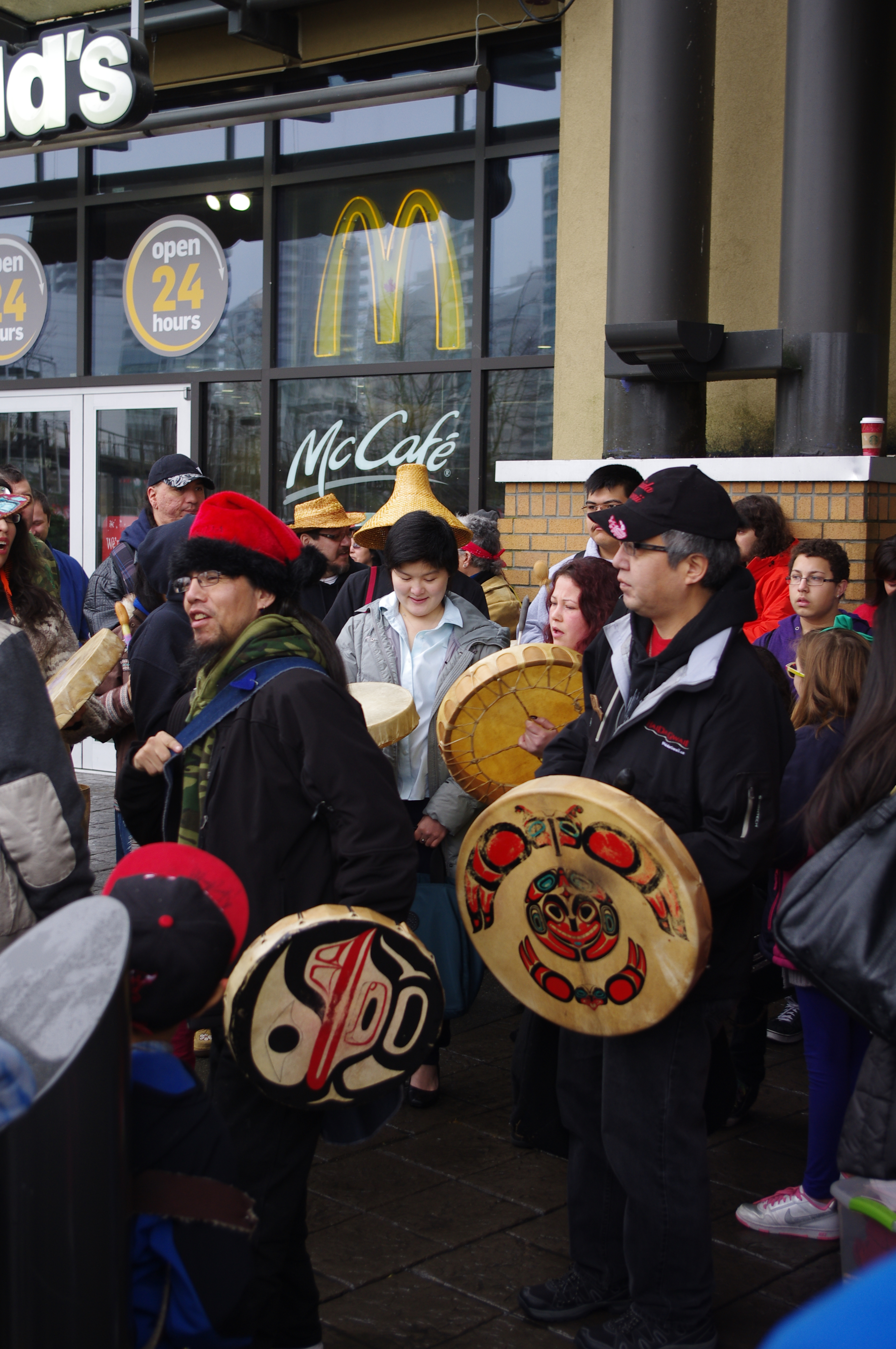
Idle No More protesters at Metropolis at Metrotown, Burnaby, British Columbia, 22 December 2013

During the Idle No More protest movement through 2012 and 2013, Chief Theresa Spence of the Attawapiskat First Nation mounted a liquids-only hunger strike and demanded a meeting with Governor General David Johnston, Prime Minister Stephen Harper, Atleo, and the chiefs of various regional and tribal councils. She, as well as several of her supporters and sympathizers, wrote to the Queen, asking Elizabeth II to instruct the Governor General to attend, but, the Queen declined to do so, indicating that she was bound to follow the advice of her ministers in the federal Cabinet. Spence then indicated that she would boycott a conference involving other First Nations leaders and the Prime Minister because the Governor General, as a non-partisan figure, declined attendance at a policy meeting. The Globe and Mail supported the idea of the Governor General playing a role by listening to grievances from Aboriginal leaders, as "listener-in-chief", but, called it "wrong" to insist that the Governor General attend policy discussions and the idea that First Nations people could relate to the Crown and the government "as if they were two separate entities [...] a fantasy". The Privy Council Office insisted the meeting not include the Governor General, to avoid giving any impression that the viceroy had the constitutional authority to change government policy. Spence and several other chiefs held a "ceremonial" meeting with the Governor General on 11 January 2013, while the separate working meeting between Harper and other chiefs took place the same day.

The report issued at the close of the Truth and Reconciliation Commission in 2015 contained 94 calls to action. Among them were requests for students, lawyers, journalists, employees of private businesses, and public servants to be provided education on Aboriginal–Crown relations and for the federal Crown-in-Council "to jointly develop with Aboriginal peoples a royal proclamation of reconciliation to be issued by the Crown [which] would build on the Royal Proclamation of 1763 [...] and reaffirm the nation-to-nation relationship between Aboriginal peoples and the Crown". It was desired the proclamation would, in part, "reconcile Aboriginal and Crown constitutional and legal orders to ensure that Aboriginal peoples are full partners in Confederation".

At Massey College, part of the University of Toronto, a gathering—also called a council—of the Queen's representatives, territorial commissioners, Assembly of First Nations National Chief Perry Bellegarde, and Mississaugas of the Credit First Nation Chief R. Stacey Laforme took place on 12 June 2019 to pay tribute to the "enduring relationship between the Crown and First Nations people". This began with the lighting of the sacred fire at sunrise, a song by Elder Gary Sault, tobacco offerings, and a circle dance and was regarded as an important act of reconciliation. A commemorative plaque was installed St. Catherine's Chapel, the chapel royal in Massey College, and unveiled by the Ontario Heritage Trust. The plaque reads, in English, French, and Ojibwe, "a Council at the Chapel Royal: Honouring the kinship kindled by the treaty relationships between First Peoples and the Crown, Indigenous leaders gathered here on June 11, 2019, with the Governor General, Lieutenant Governors, and territorial Commissioners of Canada to hear an address by the National Chief of the Assembly of First Nations. A sacred fire burned to mark this unprecedented council."

On Canada's first National Day for Truth and Reconciliation, 30 September 2021, the Queen said she "joins with all Canadians [...] to reflect on the painful history that Indigenous peoples endured in residential schools in Canada and on the work that remains to heal and to continue to build an inclusive society".

I have greatly appreciated the opportunity to discuss with the Governor General the vital process of reconciliation in this country—not a one-off act, of course, but an ongoing commitment to healing, respect and understanding. I know that our visit here this week comes at an important moment—with indigenous and non-indigenous peoples across Canada committing to reflect honestly and openly on the past and to forge a new relationship for the future.

— Prince Charles, Prince of Wales, 2022

The following year, indigenous matters were a theme throughout the royal tour of Prince Charles and his wife, Camilla, Duchess of Cornwall, to celebrate the 70th anniversary of the accession of Elizabeth II to the Canadian throne. Royal correspondent Sarah Campbell noted, "on this brief tour, there has been no shying away from acknowledging and highlighting the scandalous way many indigenous peoples have been treated in Canada". Prince Charles' efforts to learn about Canada and its indigenous peoples have been commended; he has made a point of listening, learning, and reflecting, finding that First Nations' understanding of land and sustainability are in line with his own aims regarding the natural environment, something he acknowledged when in Vancouver in 2009.

Upon the royal couple's arrival at St John's, Newfoundland and Labrador, prayers were held in Inuktitut, followed by Miꞌkmaq music. In his first speech of the tour, the Prince said that it was an "important moment" with "indigenous and non-indigenous peoples across Canada committing to reflect honestly and openly on the past, and to forge a new relationship for the future". The Prince and the Duchess participated in moments of reflection and prayer, first with Lieutenant Governor Judy Foote and indigenous leaders at Heart Garden—which had been unveiled on the grounds of the provincial Government House in 2019, in memory of former residential school students—and, two days later, at the Ceremonial Circle in the Dene community of Dettah, Northwest Territories, where they also participated in an opening prayer, a drumming circle, and a feeding the fire ceremony. Elisabeth Penashue, an elder of the Sheshatshiu Innu First Nation in Labrador, said it was "really important they hear our stories".

Charles met with various indigenous leaders. In Dene, the Prince, with Elder Bernadette Martin, Chief Edward Sangris, and Chief Fred Sangris, participated in a round-table discussion with Dene leadership. At the Prince of Wales Northern Heritage Centre, the Prince participated in a discussion on Treaty 11, its history, and its legacy in the Northwest Territories, At a reception hosted by the Governor General at Rideau Hall, in Ottawa, RoseAnne Archibald, National Chief of the Assembly of First Nations, appealed directly to the Prince for an apology from the Queen in her capacity as monarch and head of the Church of England for the wrongful acts committed in the past by the Crown and the church in relation to indigenous peoples. She said that the Prince "acknowledged" failures by Canadian governments in handling the relationship between the Crown and indigenous people, which she said "really meant something".

Indigenous culture was another component of the tour: The royal couple observed a demonstration of traditional Inuit sports in Dene, where the Duchess visited Kaw Tay Whee School to learn about the school's efforts to preserve their language, and the Prince met members of the Canadian Rangers to mark their 75th anniversary; he was shown different animal furs, drums, and weapons.

=== Reign of Charles III ===
In May 2023, just days before the coronation of King Charles III, Governor General Mary Simon organised an audience between the King and Indigenous leaders at Buckingham Palace. The three leaders—Assembly of First Nations National Chief RoseAnne Archibald, President of Inuit Tapiriit Kanatami Natan Obed, and President of the Métis National Council Cassidy Caron—were also in attendance at the coronation ceremony on 6 May. The following day, Bellegarde addressed the royal household at the first post-coronation morning service at the Chapel Royal at St James' Palace.

A delegation from the Mississauga Nation spoke with the King two months later and presented to him a wampum belt, similar to that given at the signing of the 1764 Treaty of Niagara. Among topics discussed during the 15 minute conversation at a garden party attended by 8,000 guests were the effects of that year's wildfires on indigenous communities. Chadwick Cowie, who was part of the delegation, observed that Charles has a "willingness to listen" to Indigenous people.

== Viceroys and Indigenous peoples ==
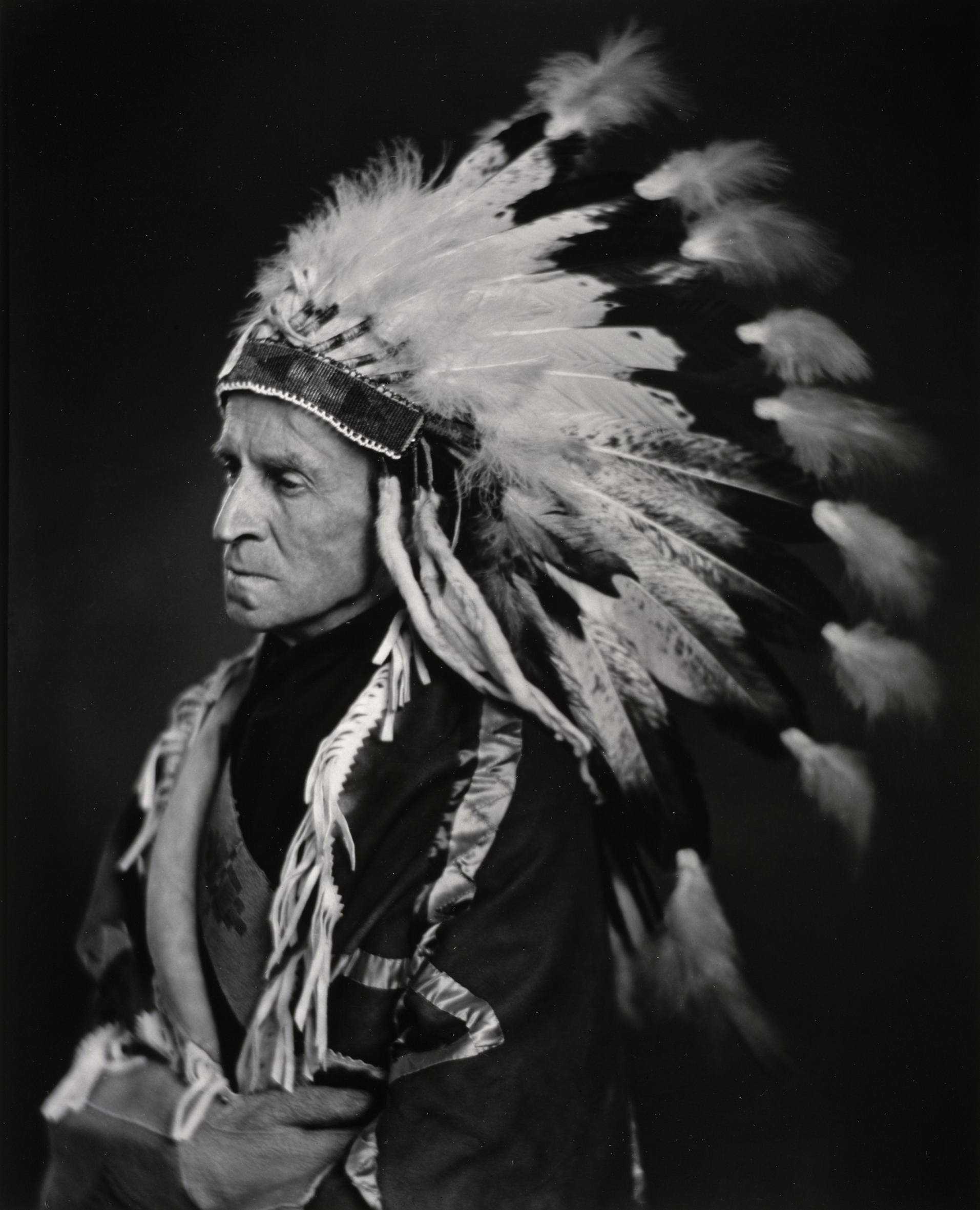
Governor General the Lord Tweedsmuir in native headdress, 1937

It seems history has come full circle. More than 200 years ago, the Anishinabe people welcomed the first Lieutenant Governor of Upper Canada, Sir John Graves Simcoe, to their territory. And now I, their descendant, am being welcomed by you as the Sovereign's representative ...

— James K. Bartleman, Lieutenant Governor of Ontario, 2001

As the representatives in Canada and the provinces of the reigning monarch, both governors general and lieutenant governors have been closely associated with First Nations, Inuit, and Métis peoples. This dates back to the colonial era, when the sovereign did not travel from Europe to Canada and so dealt with Aboriginal societies through his or her viceroy. After the American Revolution, a tradition was initiated in eastern Canada of appealing to the viceregal representatives for redress of grievances and later, after returning from a cross-country tour in 1901, during which he met with First Nations in the Yukon, Governor General the Earl of Minto urged his ministers to redress the wrongs he had witnessed in the north and to preserve native heritage and folklore.

Federal and provincial viceroys also met with First Nations leaders for more ceremonial occasions, such as when in 1867 Canada's first governor general, the Viscount Monck, received a native chief, in full feathers, among some of the first guests at Rideau Hall. The Marquess of Lansdowne smoked a calumet with Aboriginal people in the Prairies, the Marquess of Lorne was there named Great Brother-in-Law, and the Lord Tweedsmuir was honoured by the Kainai Nation through being made a chief of the Blood Indians and met with Grey Owl in Saskatchewan. The Earl Alexander of Tunis was presented with a totem pole by Kwakiutl carver Mungo Martin, which Alexander erected on the grounds of Rideau Hall, where it stands today with the inukshuk by artist Kananginak Pootoogook that was commissioned in 1997 by Governor General Roméo LeBlanc to commemorate the second National Aboriginal Day. Governor General the Viscount Byng of Vimy undertook a far-reaching tour of the north in 1925, during which he met with First Nations and heard their grievances at Fort Providence and Fort Simpson. Later, Governor General Edward Schreyer was in 1984 made an honorary member of the Kainai Chieftainship, as was one of his viceregal successors, Adrienne Clarkson, who was made such on 23 July 2005, along with being adopted into the Blood Tribe with the name Grandmother of Many Nations. Clarkson was an avid supporter of Canada's north and Inuit culture, employing students from Nunavut Arctic College to assist in designing the Clarkson Cup and creating the Governor General's Northern Medal.

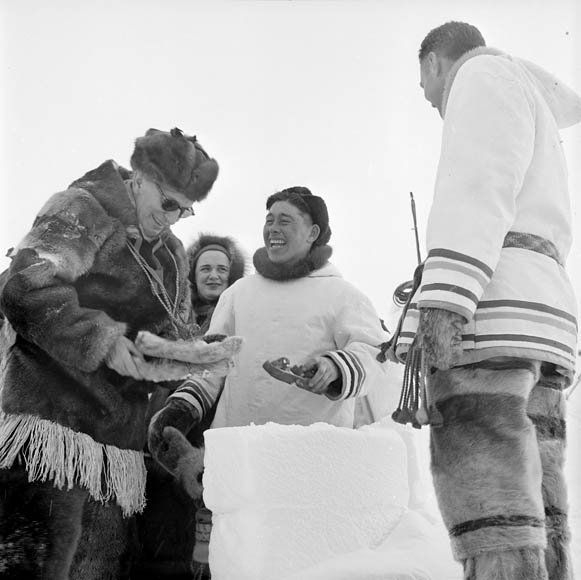
Governor General Vincent Massey (left) shares a laugh with an Inuk inhabitant of Frobisher Bay.

Five persons from First Nations have been appointed as the monarch's representative, all in the provincial spheres. Ralph Steinhauer was the first, having been made Lieutenant Governor of Alberta on 2 July 1974; Steinhauer was from the Cree nation. Yvon Dumont was of Métis heritage and served as Lieutenant Governor of Manitoba between 1993 and 1999. The first Lieutenant Governor of Ontario of Aboriginal heritage was James Bartleman, who was appointed to the position on 7 March 2002. A member of the Mnjikaning First Nation, Bartleman listed the encouragement of indigenous young people as one of his key priorities and, during his time in the Queen's service, launched several initiatives to promote literacy and social bridge building, travelling to remote native communities in northern Ontario, pairing native and non-native schools, and creating the Lieutenant Governor's Book Program, which collected 1.4 million books that were flown into the province's north to stock shelves of First Nations community libraries. On 1 October 2007, Steven Point, from the Skowkale First Nation, was installed as Lieutenant Governor of British Columbia and Graydon Nicholas, born on the Tobique Indian Reserve, was made Lieutenant Governor of New Brunswick on 30 September 2009.

On 6 July 2021, Prime Minister Justin Trudeau announced that Queen Elizabeth II had approved the appointment of Mary Simon as the 30th governor general of Canada. She received a customary audience with the Queen on 22 July, though held virtually (instead of in-person) due to the coronavirus pandemic. When sworn in on 26 July, Simon became the first indigenous governor general in Canadian history. The Queen met Simon in-person for the first time on 15 March 2022 at Windsor Castle, and hosted afternoon tea for her.

=== List of Indigenous viceroys ===
Image	Name	Ancestry	Office	Term start	Term end	Monarch(s)	First minister(s)
	Ralph Steinhauer	First Nations (Cree)	Lieutenant Governor of Alberta	July 2, 1974	October 18, 1979	Elizabeth II	Peter Lougheed
	Yvon Dumont	Métis	Lieutenant Governor of Manitoba	March 5, 1993	March 2, 1999	Elizabeth II	Gary Filmon
	James Bartleman	First Nations (Ojibwe)	Lieutenant Governor of Ontario	March 7, 2002	September 5, 2007	Elizabeth II	Mike Harris; Ernie Eves; Dalton McGuinty
	Steven Point	First Nations (Stó꞉lō)	Lieutenant Governor of British Columbia	October 1, 2007	November 2, 2012	Elizabeth II	Gordon Campbell; Christy Clark
	Mary Simon	Inuit	Governor General of Canada	July 26, 2021	June 8, 2026	Elizabeth II; Charles III	Justin Trudeau; Mark Carney

== See also ==
- Elijah Harper
- Federal Interlocutor for Métis and Non-Status Indians
- History of Canada
- Lists of Canadians
- Status of First Nations treaties in British Columbia
