= Mohawk Chapel =

Church in Ontario, Canada

Coordinates: 43.124432°N 80.235°W

His Majesty's Royal Chapel of the Mohawks
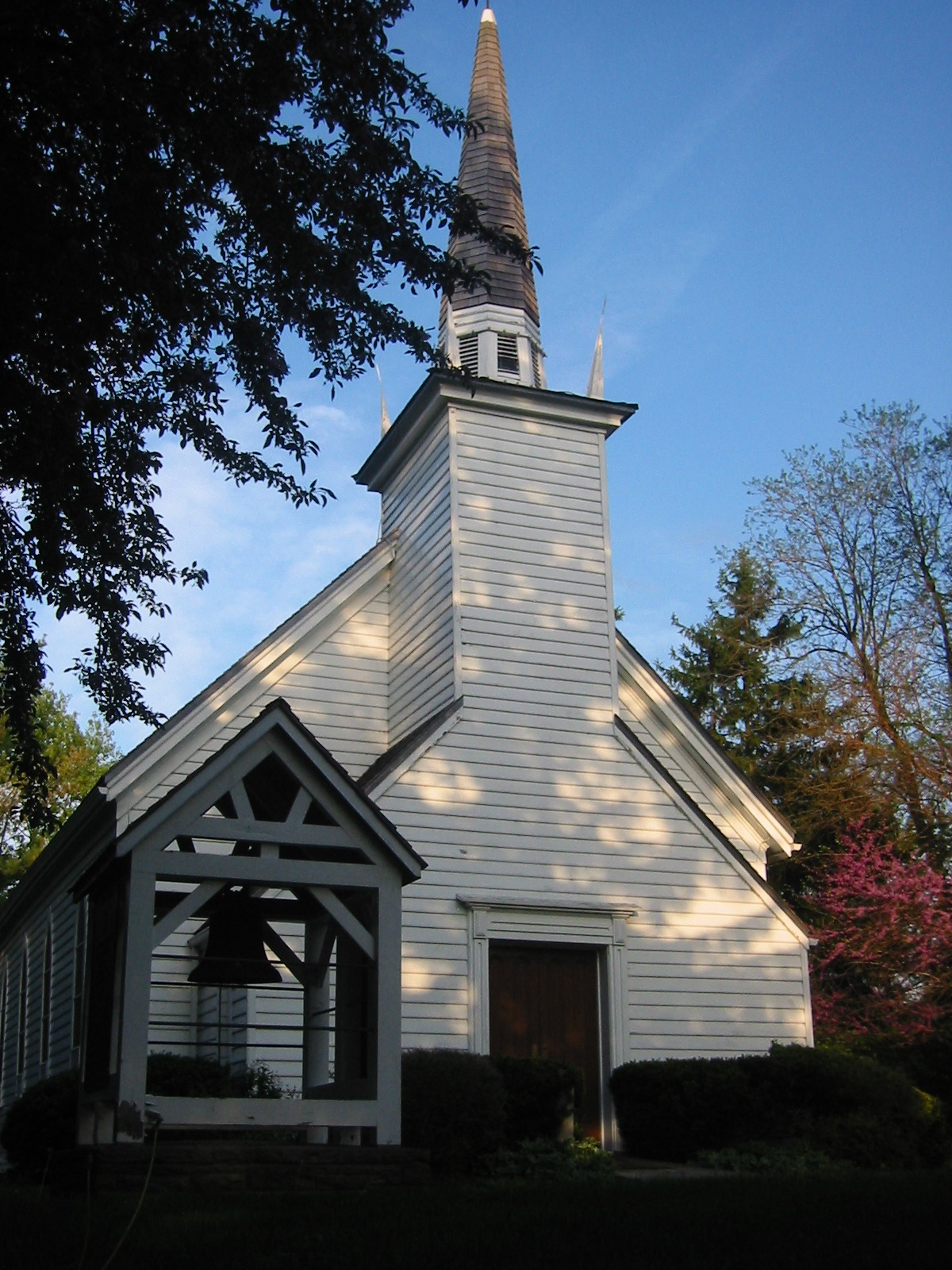
- Mohawk Chapel, Brantford, Ontario
- His Majesty's Royal Chapel of the Mohawks
- Denomination: Anglican Church of Canada
- Website: mohawkchapel.ca

History
- Dedication: Chapel Royal
- Dedicated: 1904

Architecture
- Style: Carpenter Gothic
- Years built: 1785

Administration
- Province: Canada
- Diocese: Huron

National Historic Site of Canada
- Designated: 1981

His Majesty's Royal Chapel of the Mohawks in Brantford, Ontario, Canada is the oldest surviving church building in Ontario and was the first Anglican church in Upper Canada. It is one of only three Chapels Royal in Canada. In 1981, the chapel was designated a National Historic Site of Canada.

== History ==
Constructed in 1785 by the British Crown, the chapel was given to the Mohawk people led by Joseph Brant for their support of the Crown during the American Revolution. They had migrated to Canada after Britain lost the Thirteen Colonies and were awarded land for resettlement. Originally called St. Paul's, the church is commonly referred to as the Mohawk Chapel. It is part of the Anglican Diocese of Huron and has a chaplain appointed by the Bishop of Huron, in consultation with the congregation.

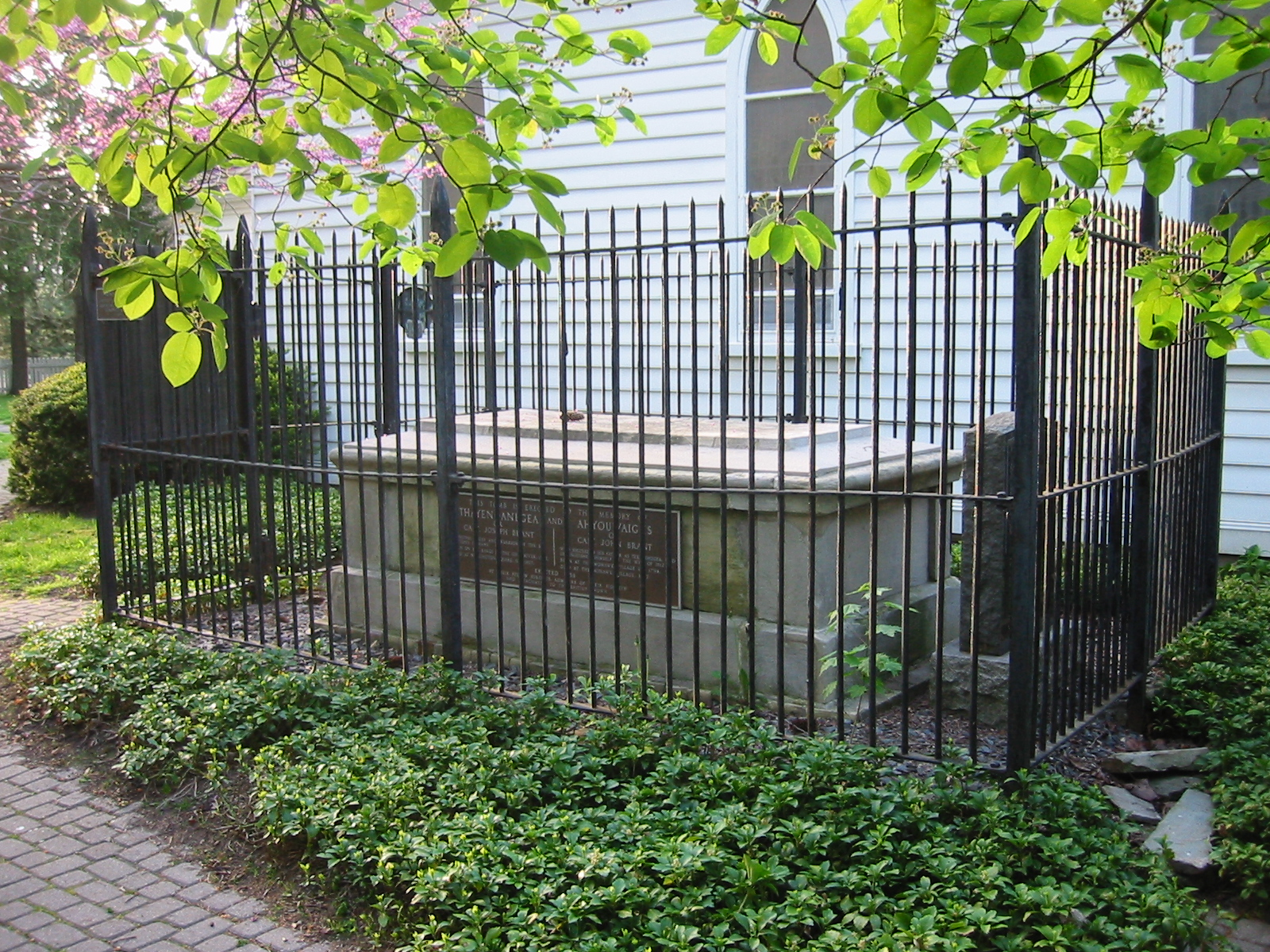
Joseph Brant's tomb

In 1850, the remains of Joseph Brant were moved from the original burial site in Burlington to a tomb at the Mohawk Chapel. His son, John Brant, was also interred in the tomb. Next to Brant's tomb is a boulder memorializing the writer Pauline Johnson, who was born in the nearby Six Nations Reserve and attended services in the chapel.

In 1904, it was designated as a Chapel Royal by King Edward VII.

== Design ==
Architecturally, the chapel is a simple building with a rectangular floor plan; it is constructed of a wood frame faced with painted clapboards. It has been renovated several times. In November 2001, it suffered minor damage during two failed arson attempts.

Originally, the entrance faced east to the canoe landing site on the bank of the Grand River, the transportation route. Eight stained glass windows, installed between 1959 and 1962, depict events from the history of the Six Nations of the Iroquois.

== Chaplains and associated clergy ==
1786 to 1827 (the first missionaries - no resident clergy):

- The Reverend John Stuart of Kingston
- The Reverend Dr. Addison of Niagara
- The Reverend R. Leeming of Ancaster
- The Reverend Mr. Hough of England

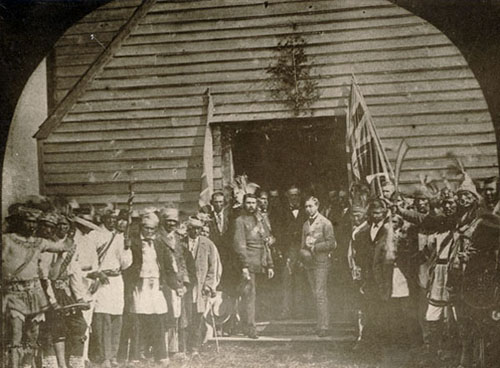
Prince Arthur with the Chiefs of the Six Nations at the Mohawk Chapel, 1869

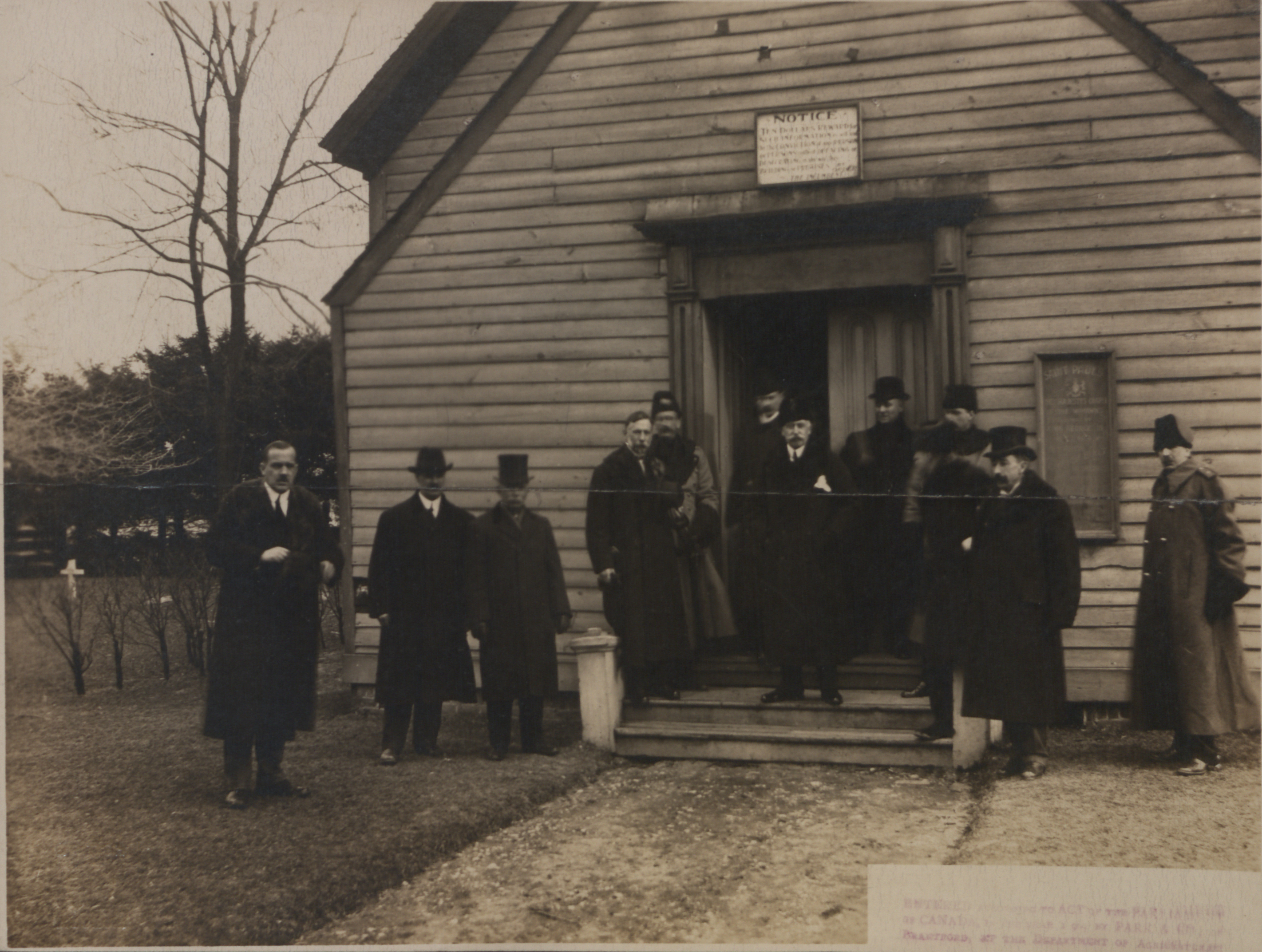
Prince Arthur at the Mohawk Chapel, 1913

1827 to present (chapel incumbents - resident clergy):

- The Reverend Robert Lugger (1827–1837)
- The Reverend Canon Jame Campbell Usher (1837)
- The Reverend A. Nelles (1837–1884)
- Archbishop R. Ashton (1885–1915)
- The Reverend C. M. Turnell (1915–1917)
- The Reverend C. H. P. Owen (1922–1929)
- The Reverend H. W. Snell (1929–1945)
- The Reverend Canon W. J. Zimmerman (1945–1981)
- The Reverend John Stables (1982–1999)
- The Reverend Norman Casey (2000–2003)
- The Reverend Larry Brown (2004–2016)
- The Reverend Rosalyn Elm (2017–present)

== See also ==
- Christ Church Royal Chapel, near Deseronto, Ontario
- The Canadian Crown and Aboriginal peoples
