= Christ Church Royal Chapel =

Coordinates: 44.18555°N 77.07341°W

Christ Church, His Majesty's Chapel Royal of the Mohawk
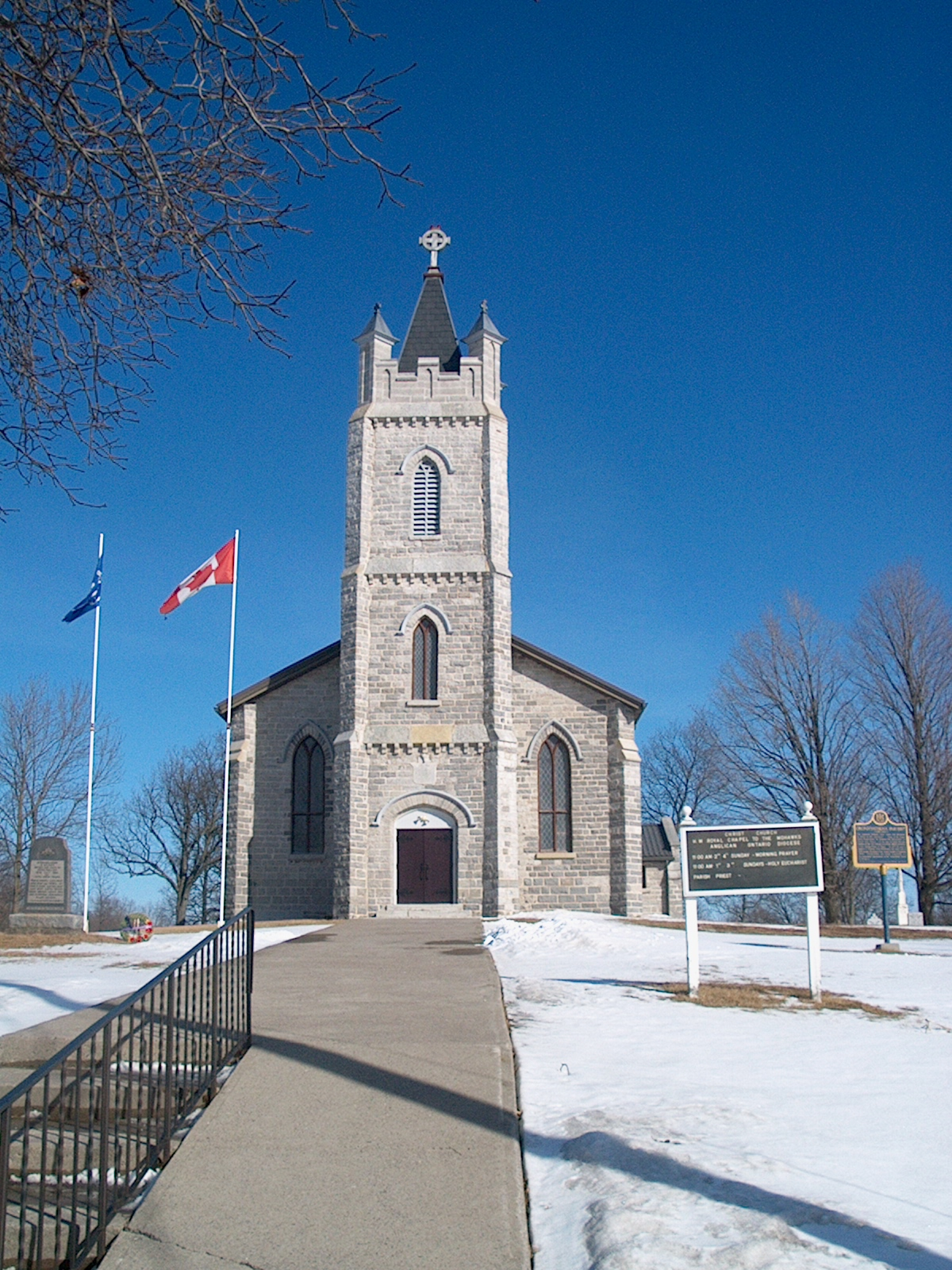
- Location: Tyendinaga Mohawk Territory
- Founded: 1784 (original church)
- Built: 1843 (current church)
- Architect: John George Howard
- Architectural style(s): Gothic Revival
- Owner: Mohawks of the Bay of Quinte First Nation
- Website: www.parishoftyendinaga.org/churches.htm

National Historic Site of Canada
- Designated: 1995

Christ Church, His Majesty's Chapel Royal of the Mohawk is located on the Tyendinaga Mohawk Territory near Deseronto, Ontario, Canada. It is owned by the Mohawks of the Bay of Quinte First Nation and is associated with the Anglican Parish of Tyendinaga, Diocese of Ontario. It was designated as a National Historic Site in 1995 and is one of only three Chapels Royal in Canada, elevated by Queen Elizabeth II in 2004.

== History ==
The history of the chapel begins with the forced relocation by American revolutionaries of the Tyendinaga Mohawks from their indigenous lands in what is now upper New York State to lands provided by George III in recognition to their service to the British during the revolutionary war. They settled in land that would eventually become the Tyendinaga Mohawk Territory on the shores of the Bay of Quinte in 1784.

The Royal chapel is in regular use as a parish church of the Anglican Diocese of Ontario. While not housed in the chapel, on special occasions, a silver Communion set given by Queen Anne in 1711 as a symbol of the alliance between the Crown and the Mohawks, is displayed and used. Also, there is a triptych in the Mohawk language and a bell given by George III, a Royal coat of arms of the United Kingdom given by George V, and a bible given by Queen Victoria.

== Present day ==
A communion chalice was given by Elizabeth II in 1984 to mark the bicentennial of the coming of the United Empire Loyalists, including the Mohawks, to Ontario. In addition, Elizabeth II also presented a set of eight silver handbells to the Chapel Royal in 2010. The chapel also houses a memorial window given by Dr. Oronhyatekha, who is buried at the Royal chapel.

Plaques commemorating the service of Mohawks during the First and Second World Wars hang in the chapel, demonstrating the continuing bond between the Tyendinaga Mohawks and the Crown.

The Chapel Royal has undergone major restoration work in recent years. A Roman Catholic group associated with the Personal Ordinariate of the Chair of Saint Peter celebrates there regularly, at the invitation of the Mohawk leadership.

== Style ==
Built to symbolise the political and military alliance between the British Crown and the Mohawk people, and to house a number of gifts given to the Mohawks by the Royal Family over three centuries, it was built by the Mohawks themselves in a simplified Gothic Revival style in 1843. The new church replaced a wooden structure which had been built near the site when the Mohawks arrived in 1784. The style, popular in the mid 19th century, is demonstrated in the narrow lancet windows and dripstones, stepped piers on the tower and flanks of the nave, and crenellations and pinnacles on the spire, all contributing to an overall sense of verticality common to gothic architecture.

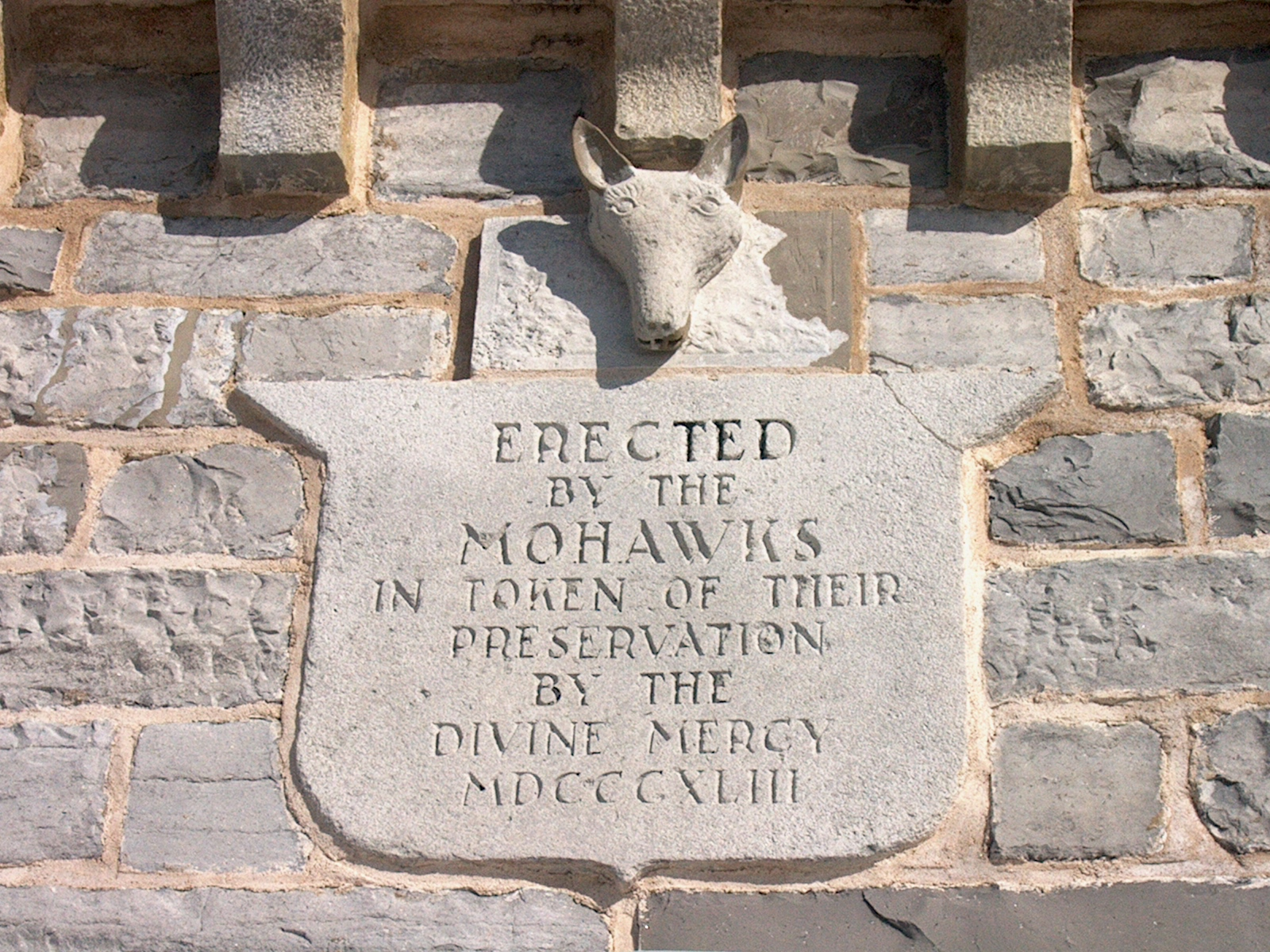
The tablet inscribed above the entrance to the church.

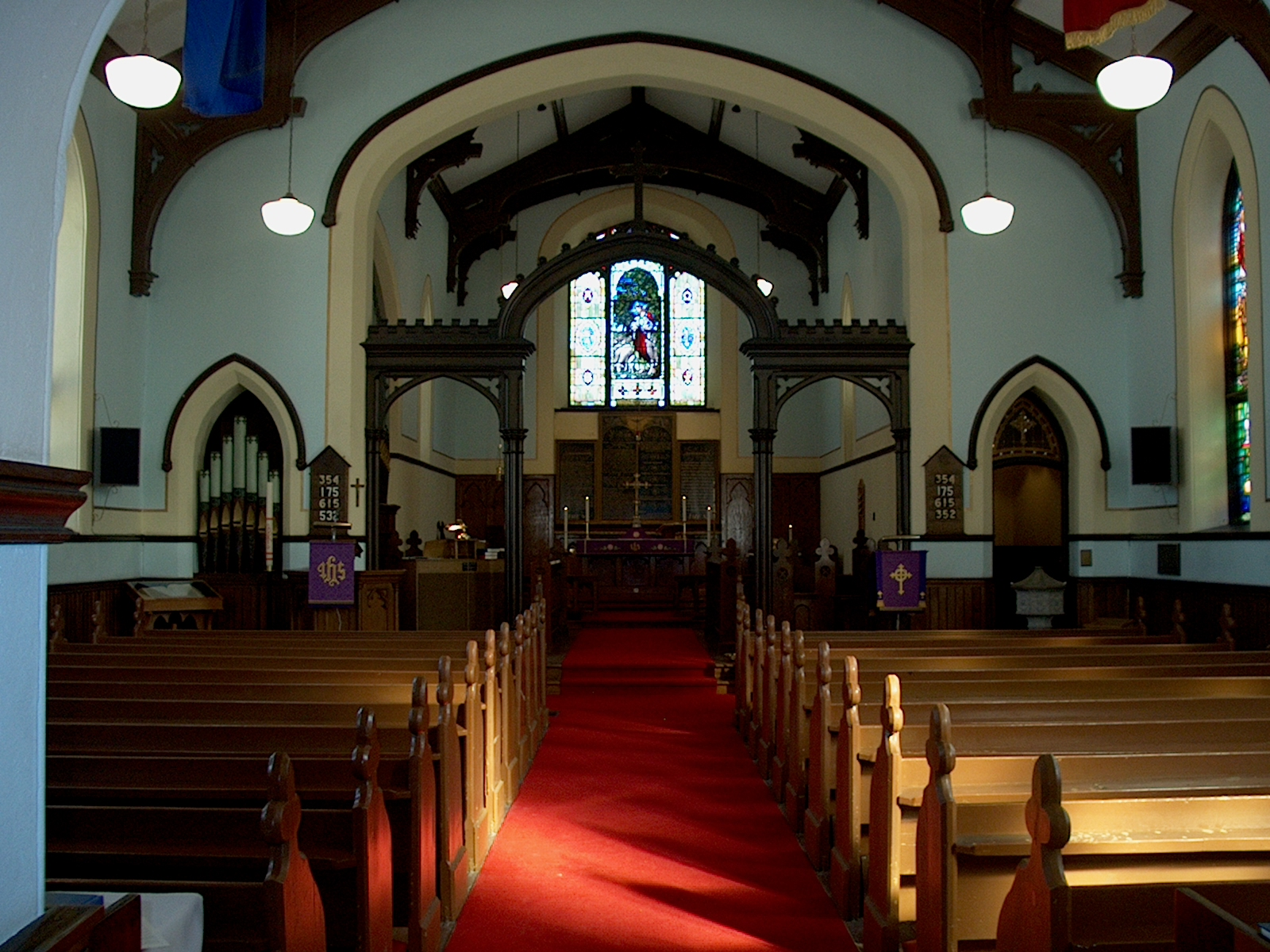
The interior of the church.

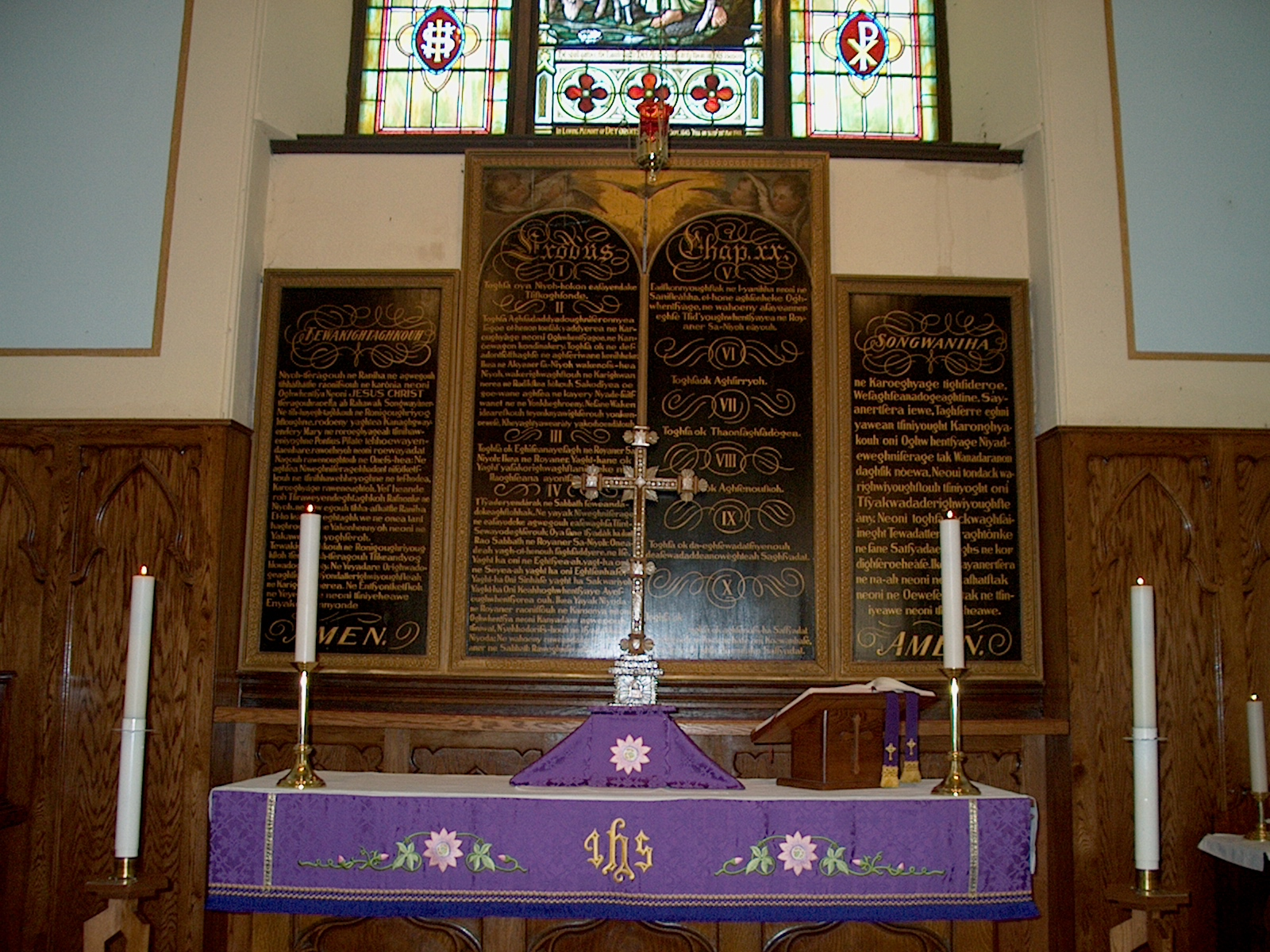
The Triptych given by King George III containing the creed, the Ten Commandments, and the 'Our Father' in the Mohawk Language.

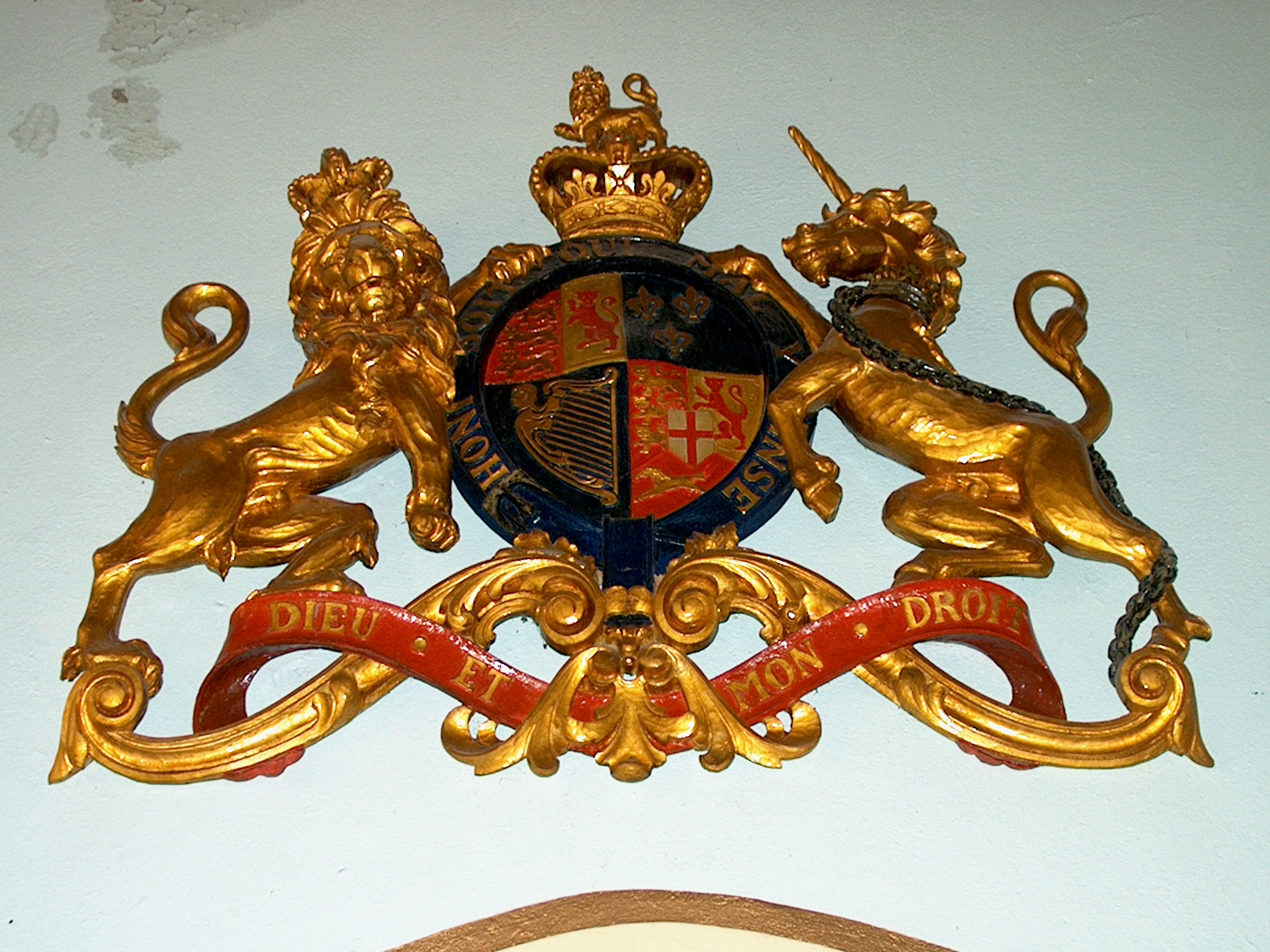
The Royal Coat of Arms given by King George V to replace an earlier set which were lost in a fire. These arms hang above the west door.

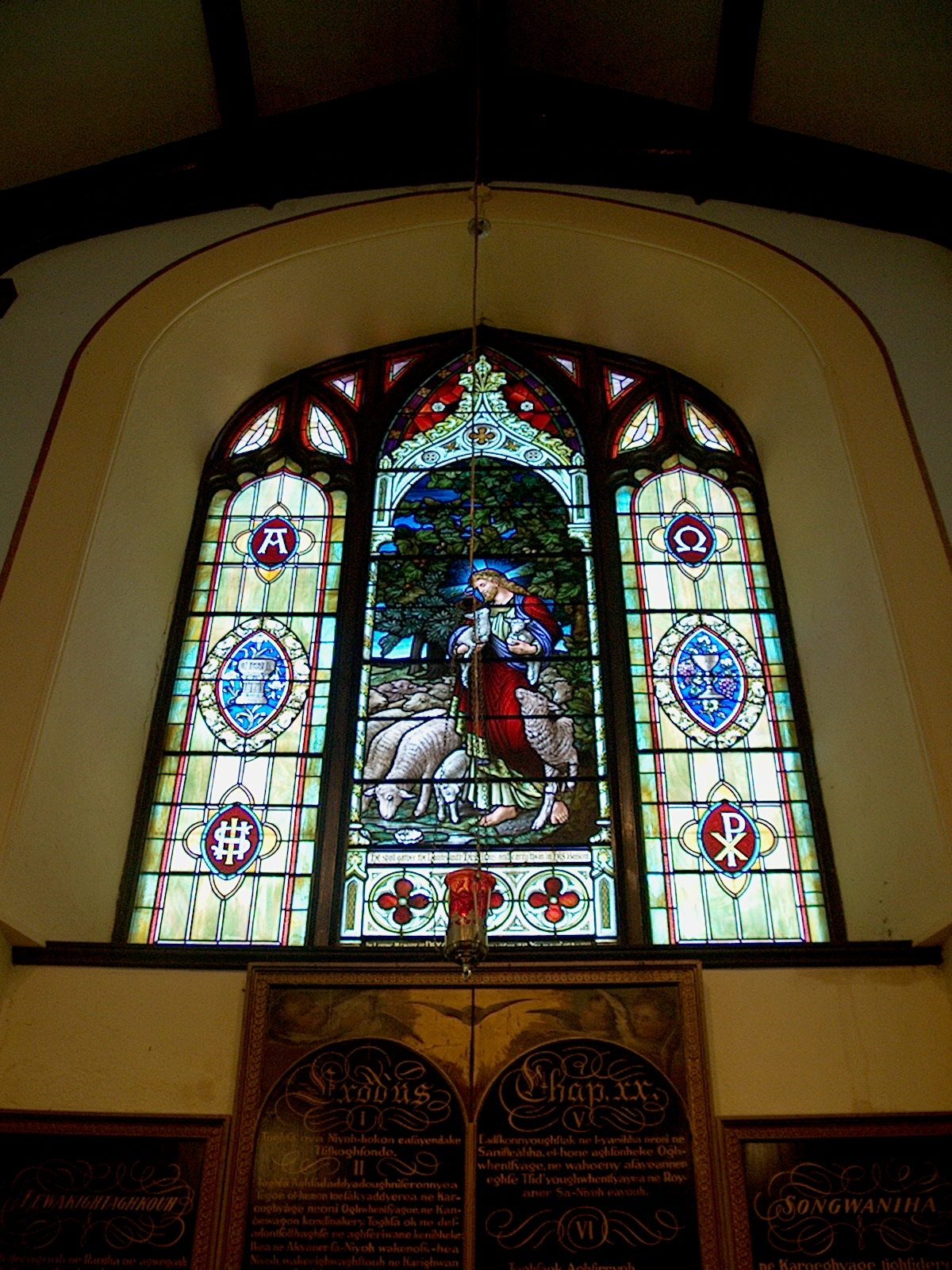
The memorial window given by Dr. Oronhyateka.

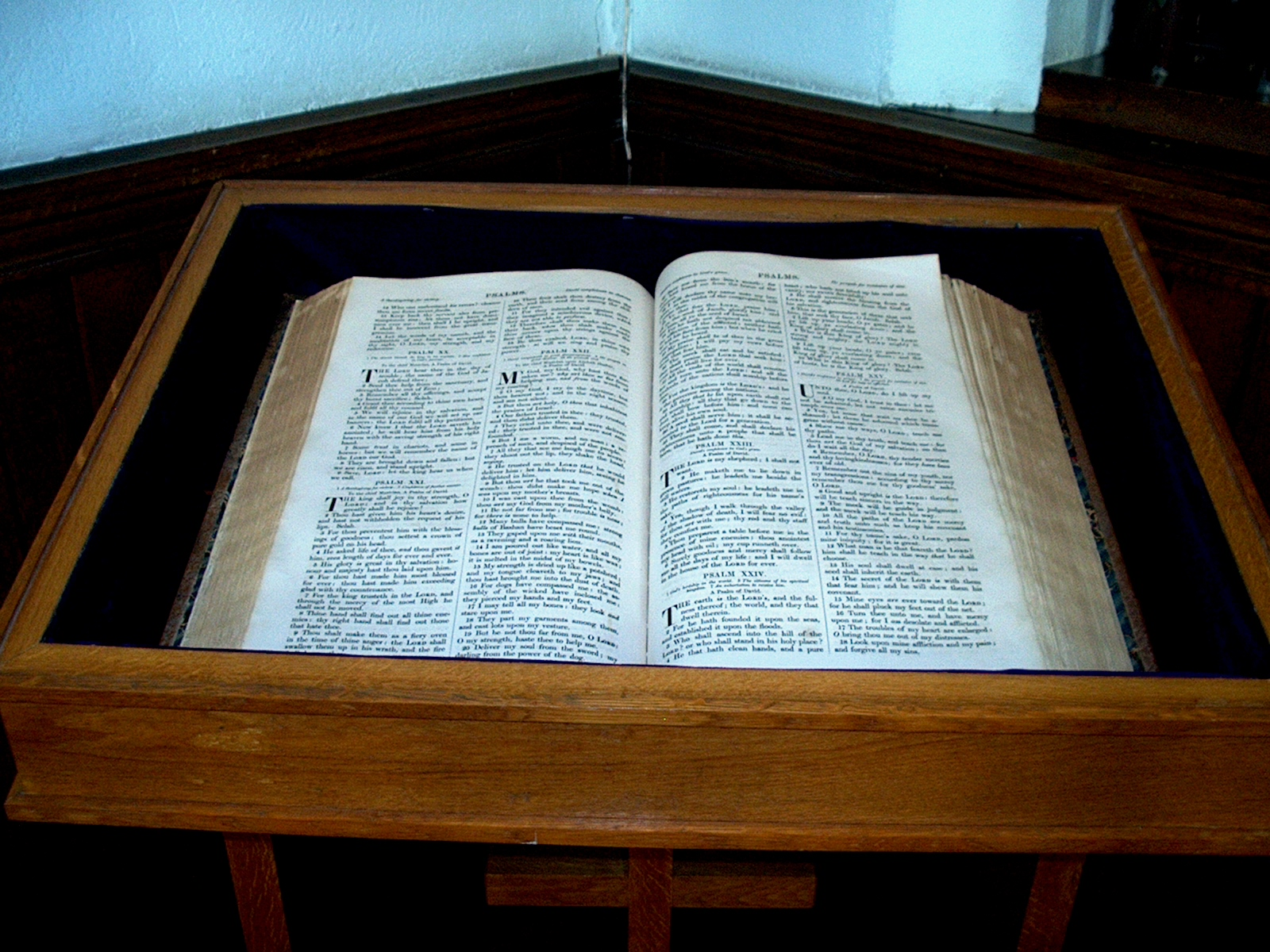
The Bible given to the Mohawks by Queen Victoria.

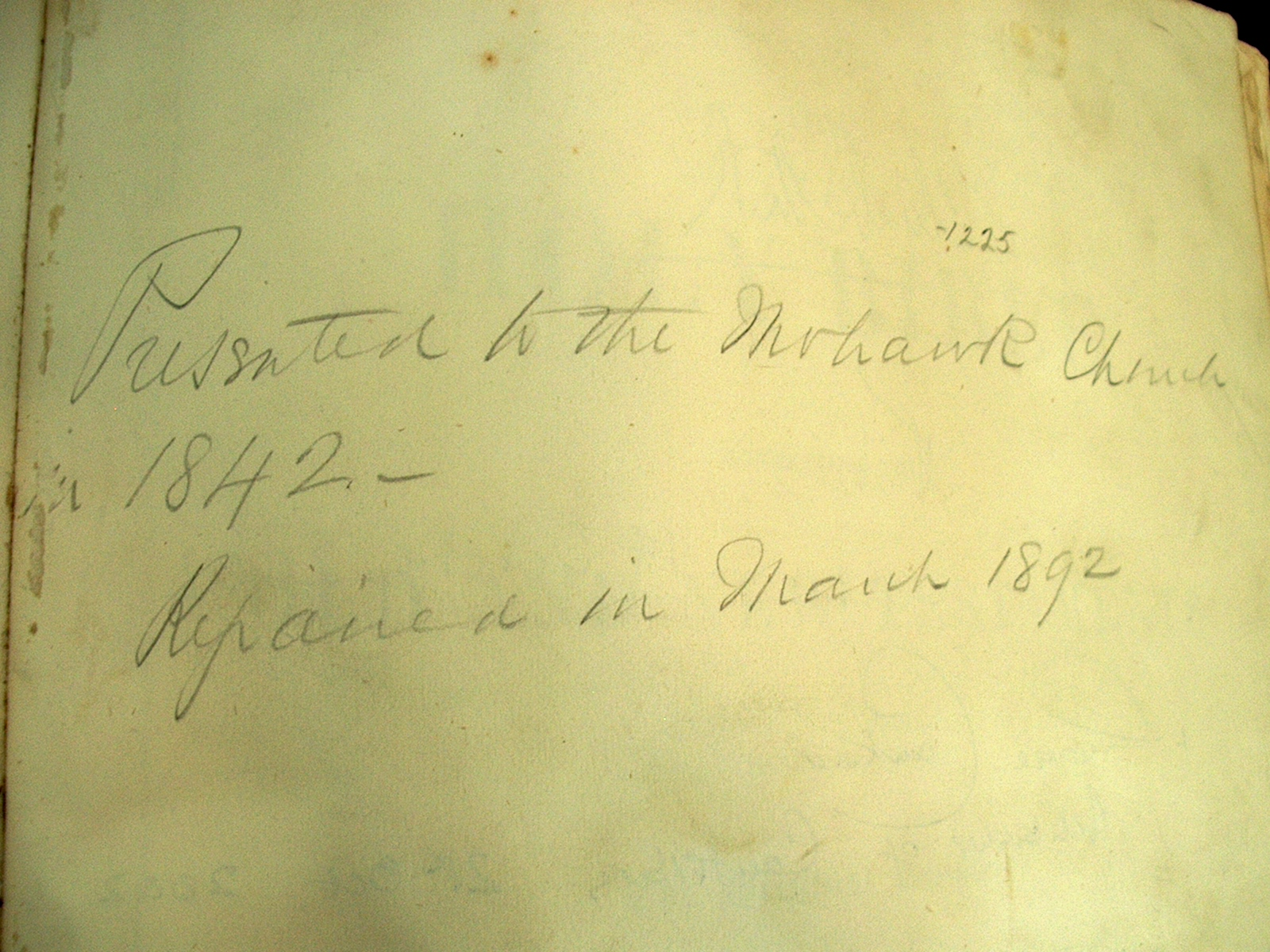
This is the note written in the front of the Bible.

== See also ==
- The Canadian Crown and Indigenous peoples of Canada
