= Division No. 9, Saskatchewan =

Census division in Canada

Coordinates: 51°34′12″N 101°54′00″W

Division No. 9
- Census division in Saskatchewan
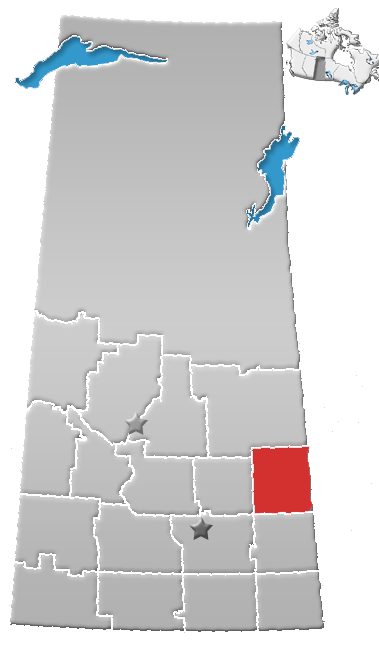
- Country: Canada
- Province: Saskatchewan

Area
  - Total: 15,281.80 km^{2} (5,900.34 sq mi)
- As of 2016

Population (2016)
  - Total: 35,634
  - Density: 2.3318/km^{2} (6.0393/sq mi)

Division No. 9 is one of eighteen census divisions in the province of Saskatchewan, Canada, as defined by Statistics Canada. It is located in the eastern part of the province, bordering Manitoba. The most populous community in this division is Yorkton.

== Demographics ==
In the 2021 Census of Population conducted by Statistics Canada, Division No. 9 had a population of 36,047 living in 15,454 of its 18,216 total private dwellings, a change of 1.2% from its 2016 population of 35,634. With a land area of 14,851.26 km^{2} (5,734.10 sq mi), it had a population density of 2.4/km^{2} (6.3/sq mi) in 2021.

Knowledge of languages in Division No. 9 (1991−2021)
Language	2021		2011		2001		1991	
Language	Pop.	%	Pop.	%	Pop.	%	Pop.	%
English	35,110	99.6%	34,545	99.77%	36,250	99.88%	40,020	99.6%
Ukrainian	1,685	4.78%	3,170	9.16%	6,300	17.36%	9,710	24.17%
Tagalog	1,060	3.01%	330	0.95%	20	0.06%	45	0.11%
French	750	2.13%	660	1.91%	840	2.31%	770	1.92%
German (Note: Combined responses of the High German languages, including Standard German, Pennsylvania German, Swiss German, and Yiddish.)	440	1.25%	465	1.34%	810	2.23%	1,335	3.32%
Hindustani (Note: Combined responses of Hindi and Urdu as they form mutually intelligible registers of the Hindustani language.)	440	1.25%	0	0%	35	0.1%	30	0.07%
Russian	220	0.62%	245	0.71%	620	1.71%	1,055	2.63%
Punjabi	220	0.62%	0	0%	0	0%	10	0.02%
Chinese (Note: Combined responses of the Chinese languages, including Mandarin, Cantonese, Min Nan, Hakka, Wu (Shanghainese), Min Dong, Chinese, n.o.s., and Chinese languages, n.i.e..)	150	0.43%	105	0.3%	140	0.39%	225	0.56%
Spanish	135	0.38%	50	0.14%	80	0.22%	60	0.15%
Cree (Note: Combined responses of the Cree-Innu languages, previously categorized under "Cree" in past censuses.)	90	0.26%	80	0.23%	85	0.23%	75	0.19%
Polish	75	0.21%	300	0.87%	350	0.96%	580	1.44%
Dutch	45	0.13%	65	0.19%	60	0.17%	100	0.25%
Greek	45	0.13%	0	0%	25	0.07%	25	0.06%
Portuguese	35	0.1%	0	0%	0	0%	10	0.02%
Hungarian	25	0.07%	50	0.14%	100	0.28%	160	0.4%
Arabic	25	0.07%	20	0.06%	40	0.11%	15	0.04%
Italian	15	0.04%	55	0.16%	30	0.08%	15	0.04%
Persian (Note: Combined responses of Iranian Persian, Dari, and Persian (Farsi), n.o.s., as they form mutually intelligible registers of the Persian language)	10	0.03%	0	0%	0	0%	0	0%
Total responses	35,250	97.79%	34,625	98.05%	36,295	98.37%	40,180	98.59%
Total population	36,047	100%	35,314	100%	36,895	100%	40,755	100%

== Census subdivisions ==
The following census subdivisions (municipalities or municipal equivalents) are located within Saskatchewan's Division No. 9.

=== Cities ===
- Yorkton

=== Towns ===
- Canora
- Kamsack
- Norquay
- Preeceville
- Springside
- Sturgis

=== Villages ===
- Arran
- Buchanan
- Calder
- Ebenezer
- Endeavour
- Hyas
- Invermay
- Lintlaw
- Pelly
- Rama
- Rhein
- Sheho
- Stenen
- Theodore
- Togo

=== Rural municipalities ===
- RM No. 241 Calder
- RM No. 243 Wallace
- RM No. 244 Orkney
- RM No. 245 Garry
- RM No. 271 Cote
- RM No. 273 Sliding Hills
- RM No. 274 Good Lake
- RM No. 275 Insinger
- RM No. 301 St. Philips
- RM No. 303 Keys
- RM No. 304 Buchanan
- RM No. 305 Invermay
- RM No. 331 Livingston
- RM No. 333 Clayton
- RM No. 334 Preeceville
- RM No. 335 Hazel Dell

=== Indian reserves ===
- Cote First Nation
  - Cote 64
- Keeseekoose First Nation
  - Keeseekoose 66
  - Keeseekoose 66A
  - Keeseekoose 66-CA-04
  - Keeseekoose 66-CA-05
  - Keeseekoose 66-CA-06
  - Keeseekoose 66-KE-04
  - Keeseekoose 66-KE-05
- The Key First Nation
  - The Key 65

== See also ==
- List of census divisions of Saskatchewan
- List of communities in Saskatchewan
