= Saskatchewan Highway 49 =

Provincial highway in Western Canada

Highway 49
- Highway 49 highlighted in red

Route information
- Maintained by Ministry of Highways and Infrastructure
- Length: 166.4 km (103.4 mi)

Saskatchewan
- Length: 165.2 km (102.7 mi)
- West end: Highway 35 south of Fosston
- Major intersections: Highway 38 near Kelvington; Highway 47 at Preeceville; Highway 9 at Preeceville and Stenen; Highway 8 at Norquay and Pelly
- East end: Manitoba border

Manitoba
- Length: 1.2 km (0.75 mi)
- West end: Saskatchewan border
- East end: PTH 83 near Benito

Location
- Country: Canada
- Province: Saskatchewan
- Rural municipalities: Ponass Lake, Lakeview, Kelvington, Sasman, Hazel Dell, Preeceville, Clayton, Keys, St. Philips, Livingston Swan Valley West

Highway system
- Provincial highways in Saskatchewan
- Provincial highways in Manitoba; Winnipeg City Routes
← Highway 48	→ Highway 51
← PTH 45	→ PTH 50

Highway 49 and Provincial Trunk Highway 49 (PTH 49) is a provincial highway in the Canadian provinces of Saskatchewan and Manitoba. Most of the highway is in the east-central part of Saskatchewan and only a very short section is in Manitoba. It runs from Saskatchewan Highway 35 between the communities of Fosston and Hendon to the Saskatchewan – Manitoba border, before ending at Provincial Trunk Highway 83 south of the community of Benito. The combined highway is about 166.4 kilometres (103.4 mi) in length — 165.2 kilometres (102.7 mi) is in Saskatchewan and 1.2 kilometres (0.7 mi) is in Manitoba.

== Route description ==
Highway 49 begins at its western terminus with Highway 35 five kilometres (3.1 mi) south of Fosston. From Highway 35, it travels east to the Manitoba border, where it transitions to PTH 49. This is a primary Saskatchewan highway maintained by the provincial government and is paved for its length. Located along the highway are the communities of Kelvington, Nut Mountain, Okla, Lintlaw, Ketchen, Preeceville, Sturgis, Hyas, Norquay, Pelly, and Arran. Just west of Preeceville, Highway 49 crosses the Assiniboine River. Less than 1 mile (1.6 km) after crossing into Manitoba, the highway terminates at PTH 83 three kilometres (1.9 mi), south of Benito.

North of Pelly on the Swan River, and accessed from a road off Highway 661, is Fort Livingstone. It is the site of the first capital for the North-West Territories from 1874 to 1876.

== Saskatchewan ==
=== Major attractions ===
Highway 49 provides access to the following recreational areas, roadside attractions, and historical sites and buildings:

- Hockey Cards billboard is a Canadian roadside attraction near Kelvington, Canada’s hockey Factory
- Sturgis & District Regional Park
- Norquay Campground is located near the town centre of Norquay
- Preeceville Picnic Area is 2.5 kilometres (1.6 mi) east of Preeceville.
- Preeceville Wildlife Association Campground is just north of the town of Preeceville with hiking trails to Annie Laurie Lake and a new beach there.
- Sturgis hosts Saskatchewan's Largest One Day Sports & Rodeo
- Bucking Horse and Rider statue is a large Canadian roadside attraction is located in Rodeo Falls Park along Highway 49.
- The Sturgis Museum is located in the old CNR Station which has been relocated on the Assiniboine River Valley a block south of Highway 9/49. This museum features pioneer artifacts as well as local arrowheads.
- Fort Pelly-Livingstone Museum features the local areas vibrant Royal North-West Mounted Police history. The original fort was entitled Fort Livingstone or (Swan River Barracks) located on the forks of Swan River and Snake Creek and is designated as a heritage site.

=== History ===
- Ketchen, Preeceville, Sturgis, and Norquay all host early Norwegian ethnic bloc settling in the early 20th century.
- 1899 saw the arrival of Doukhobor settlers near the area of Pelly, Saskatchewan
- In 1876, David Laird, the first Lieutenant-Governor of the North-West Territories held the First Session of the North-West Territorial Council at Fort Livingstone near Pelly, Saskatchewan. The Dominion Government designated this area as the First Seat of Government for the entire territories in 1875. The capital of the North-West Territories and Royal North West Mounted Police Barracks soon moved to Battleford.

== Manitoba ==
Provincial Trunk Highway 49 is a very short provincial highway in Manitoba. It runs from the Saskatchewan border to PTH 83 three kilometres (1.9 mi) south of Benito.

The highway is less than 1 mile (1.6 km) long (the sign welcoming westbound motorists to Saskatchewan can be seen from PTH 83) and connects with the same numbered highway across the border. Along with PTH 27 and 57, PTH 49 is one of the shortest provincial trunk highways within Manitoba.

The speed limit is 90 km/h (55 mph).

=== History ===
Prior to 1947, PTH 49 was part of Manitoba Highway 6, which extended via Benito to Swan River, Dauphin, and Minnedosa. The section from the highway's current eastern terminus to Roblin was opened to traffic in 1948 and designated as Highway 31 along with the remaining section of highway to Swan River. This route was redesignated as PTH 83 in 1954.

The current route between the Saskatchewan border and Highway 31 was redesignated to PTH 49 in 1947.

== Major intersections ==
From west to east:

Province	Rural Municipality	Location	km	mi	Destinations	Notes
Saskatchewan	Ponass Lake No. 367 (Note: North of Highway 49); Lakeview No. 337 (Note: South of Highway 49)		0.0	0.0	Highway 35 – Tisdale, Wadena	
Saskatchewan	Kelvington No. 366; Sasman No. 336		11.4	7.1	Highway 665 south – Kylemore	
Saskatchewan	Kelvington No. 366; Sasman No. 336	Kelvington	19.5	12.1	Highway 38 – Kelvington, Porcupine Plain, Kuroki	
Saskatchewan	Hazel Dell No. 335	Lintlaw	41.8	26.0	Highway 617 south / Highway 759 east (Main Street) – Invermay, Endeavour	
Saskatchewan	Hazel Dell No. 335		61.8	38.4	Hazel Dell access road to Highway 755	
Saskatchewan	Hazel Dell No. 335		68.3	42.4	Highway 753 north	
Saskatchewan	Preeceville No. 334	Preeceville	84.9	52.8	Highway 47 south – Buchanan	
Saskatchewan	Preeceville No. 334	Preeceville	86.4	53.7	Highway 9 north – Hudson Bay	West end of Highway 9 concurrency
Saskatchewan	Preeceville No. 334	Sturgis	94.3	58.6	Highway 664 south – Tiny	
Saskatchewan	Clayton No. 333; Keys No. 303		106.3	66.1	Highway 9 south – Canora, Yorkton	East end of Highway 9 concurrency
Saskatchewan	Clayton No. 333; Keys No. 303		107.9	67.0	Highway 662 north – Stenen	
Saskatchewan	Clayton No. 333; Keys No. 303	Hyas	116.0	72.1	Highway 650 south – Mikado	West end of Highway 650 concurrency
Saskatchewan	Clayton No. 333; Keys No. 303		117.6	73.1	Highway 650 north – Danbury	East end of Highway 650 concurrency
Saskatchewan	Clayton No. 333; Keys No. 303	Norquay	127.4	79.2	Highway 8 north – Swan Plain	West end of Highway 8 concurrency
Saskatchewan	Keys No. 303	Norquay	129.2	80.3	Highway 637 south – Veregin	
Saskatchewan	St. Philips No. 301	Pelly	139.9	86.9	Highway 8 south – Kamsack Highway 661 north	East end of Highway 8 concurrency
Saskatchewan	Livingston No. 331; St. Philips No. 301	Arran	155.5	96.6	Highway 648 north – Whitebeech Highway 660 south – St. Philips	
Saskatchewan – Manitoba border			165.2 0.0	102.7 0.0	Provincial boundary	
Manitoba	Swan Valley West		1.2	0.75	PTH 83 – Swan River, Roblin	South of Benito
1.000 mi = 1.609 km; 1.000 km = 0.621 mi: Concurrency terminus; Route transition

== See also ==
- Transportation in Saskatchewan
- Roads in Saskatchewan
