= Margaret Cote =

Indigenous Canadian academic and author (1950–2021)

- Born: August 2, 1950; Cote First Nation, Saskatchewan, Canada
- Died: March 31, 2021 (aged 70)
- Education: Brandon University (BEd); Saskatchewan Indian Federated College (BA)
- Occupations: Author; linguist; historian
- Writing career
- Notable works: Nēnapohs̆ Āhtahsōkēwinan / Nēnapohs̆ Legends (2011); Mācī-Anihšināpēmowin / Beginning Saulteaux (2021)

Margaret R. Cote (also Margaret R. Cote-Lerat, August 2, 1950 – March 31, 2021), was a Canadian educator, author, linguist, and historian. A Saulteaux, she is best known for her work concerning the preservation of Western Ojibwe language and culture, as well as being the first teacher in Saskatchewan to teach a First Nations language in a public school.

== Early life and education ==
Cote was born August 2, 1950, on the Cote First Nation, Saskatchewan, where she was raised. She was one of four children of John F. and Madelaine M. Cote. She grew up surrounded by Saulteaux culture and spoke the Saulteaux language until she began attending the Canadian Indian residential school system. Cote attended the Cote Day School and then the Fort Pelly Residential School (St. Philip's Residential School), where she attended grades one through eight. She attended Kamsack Junior High School for grade nine, she then attended the Qu'Appelle Indian Residential School (Lebret Indian Residential School) for grade ten. She finished her final two years through a vocational upgrading program by the Cote First Nation.

Cote acquired a Bachelor of Education at Brandon University in 1980. During her time at Brandon University, she attended Saulteaux language courses and worked as a language lab assistant and tutor. In 1990, Cote graduated from the Saskatchewan Indian Federated College with a degree in linguistics with distinction. She was one of the first three to do so, alongside Solomon Ratt and Billy-Joe Laboucan.

== Career ==
In 1968, Cote began working with the Pelly Indian Agency office at the age of seventeen. From 1971 to 1978, Cote worked as a secretary and accountant for the Cote Band.

According to Charlene Crevier writing in Saskatchewan First Nations: Lives Past and Present, Cote "was the first person to teach a First Nations language in a public school". In 1979, Cote developed Saulteaux language curriculum guides during her time within the Indian Language Program at the Saskatchewan Indian Cultural College (now the Saskatchewan Indigenous Cultural Centre). Cote worked for the SICC as a sessional lecturer from 1982 to 1984. She went on to teach at the Brandon University and at the Kamsack Junior High School (now Kamsack Comprehensive Institute) in 1980, before moving on to teaching at the First Nations University of Canada. Cote was a member of the FNUniv faculty from 1980 until her retirement in 2010.

Cote published her first book, Nahkawewin Saulteaux (Ojibway Dialect of the Plains) in 1984. Throughout her career she published 20 books regarding Saulteaux language and culture. Her works Nahkawewin and Saulteaux Verb Book primarily concern Saulteaux semantic and morphological structure. Cote published 16 children's books for her Saulteaux Talking Books series. She also participated in the translation of four stories for CD-ROMs by Pebble Beach Interactive Fiction Inc. for Saskatchewan Education. A linguist, Cote presented within several conferences and workshops, including during the 33rd Annual Algonquian Conference on the Semantic and Morphological Structure of Saulteaux Conditional Sentences and Relative Clauses (2001).

== Personal life ==
Cote's parents aided her in beginning to preserve the Saulteaux language. She eventually mentored her niece, Lynn Cote, to continue her work in preserving the language. Cote strongly believed in the importance of preserving First Nations languages and recorded 17 elders for the purposes of transcribing and translating as many narrative categories as possible.

While attending the Lebret Residential School, Cote met her first husband, Ivan Cote, with whom she had three sons and a daughter. Before she died, Cote was engaged to Andy Pascal and the couple planned to wed when the COVID-19 pandemic subsided. Cote's death was announced on Facebook on March 31, 2021. She was buried in the Cote First Nation.

== Bibliography: List of works ==
- 1982: Nahkawētā : a Saulteaux language course OCLC 56243971
- 1985: Nahkawēwin Saulteaux : Ojibway dialect of the plains OCLC 56269753
- 1985: Nihso mahkwak OCLC 56268050
- 1985: Saulteaux Verb Book OCLC 56276331
- 1987: Conditional Sentences in Cree and Saulteaux
- 2008: Ānı̄n ēntōtamān kikis̆ēp ISBN 9781551655109
- 2011: Nēnapohs̆ Āhtahsōkēwinan / Nēnapohs̆ Legends ISBN 9780889772199
- 2019: posâkanacîweyiniwak : nitaskînân = The Touchwood Hills People : Our Land OCLC 1104081879
- 2021: Mācī-Anihšināpēmowin / Beginning Saulteaux ISBN 9780889777514
- Nahkawewin Workbook
- Saulteaux Syllabics Book
- Nahkawewin recordings
- Saulteaux Talking Books series
- First Edition Saulteaux Dictionary
- Anihsinape-Apinoci Nakamowinan: Children's Saulteaux Songs and Nursery Rhymes
