= Okla =

Okla is an abbreviation of the U.S. state of Oklahoma.

It can also refer to:

- Okla, Saskatchewan, an organized hamlet in Saskatchewan, Canada
- Okla, Hitchiti language for Tribal town
