= Rural Municipality of Clayton No. 333 =

Rural municipality in Saskatchewan, Canada

Clayton No. 333
- Rural municipality
- Rural Municipality of Clayton No. 333

- Location of the RM of Clayton No. 333 in Saskatchewan
- Coordinates: 52.055°N 102.178°W
- Country: Canada
- Province: Saskatchewan
- Census division: 9
- SARM division: 4
- Formed: January 1, 1913

Government
  - Reeve: Duane Hicks
  - Governing body: RM of Clayton No. 333 Council
  - Administrator: Rhonda Bellefeuille
  - Office location: Hyas

Area (2016)
  - Land: 1,401.57 km^{2} (541.15 sq mi)

Population (2016)
  - Total: 592
  - Density: 0.4/km^{2} (1.0/sq mi)
- Time zone: CST
  - Summer (DST): CST
- Area codes: 306 and 639

The Rural Municipality of Clayton No. 333 (2016 population: 592) is a rural municipality (RM) in the Canadian province of Saskatchewan within Census Division No. 9 and SARM Division No. 4.

== History ==
The RM of Clayton No. 333 incorporated as a rural municipality on January 1, 1913.

== Geography ==
=== Communities and localities ===
The following urban municipalities are surrounded by the RM.

Towns

- Norquay

Villages

- Hyas
- Stenen

The following unincorporated communities are within the RM.

Organized hamlets

- Swan Plain

Localities

- Arabella
- Danbury

== Demographics ==
Population history (1981–2016)
Year	Pop.	±%
1981	1,304	—
1986	1,138	−12.7%
1991	1,050	−7.7%
1996	886	−15.6%
2001	815	−8.0%
2006	753	−7.6%
2011	669	−11.2%
2016	592	−11.5%
Source: Statistics Canada via Saskatchewan Bureau of Statistics

In the 2021 Census of Population conducted by Statistics Canada, the RM of Clayton No. 333 had a population of 631 living in 253 of its 307 total private dwellings, a change of 5.7% from its 2016 population of 597. With a land area of 1,380.68 km^{2} (533.08 sq mi), it had a population density of 0.5/km^{2} (1.2/sq mi) in 2021.

In the 2016 Census of Population, the RM of Clayton No. 333 recorded a population of 592 living in 252 of its 305 total private dwellings, a −11.5% change from its 2011 population of 669. With a land area of 1,401.57 km^{2} (541.15 sq mi), it had a population density of 0.4/km^{2} (1.1/sq mi) in 2016.

== Attractions ==
- Sturgis Station House Museum
- Fort Pelly National Historic Site
- Prairie National Wildlife Area

== Government ==
The RM of Clayton No. 333 is governed by an elected municipal council and an appointed administrator that meets on the second Wednesday of every month. The reeve of the RM is Duane Hicks while its administrator is Rhonda Bellefeuille. The RM's office is located in Hyas.

== Transportation ==
- Saskatchewan Highway 8
- Saskatchewan Highway 9
- Saskatchewan Highway 49
- Saskatchewan Highway 650
- Saskatchewan Highway 662
- Saskatchewan Highway 753
- Canadian National Railway

== See also ==
- List of rural municipalities in Saskatchewan
