= List of teams on the 2016–17 World Curling Tour =

Following is a list of teams on the 2016–17 World Curling Tour, which was part of the 2016-17 curling season. Only the skips of the teams are listed.

== Men ==
Updated December 22, 2016

Skip	Locale
Shinya Abe	Sapporo, Japan
Carson Ackerman	Saskatoon, Saskatchewan
Jason Ackerman	Regina, Saskatchewan
Shawn Adams	Halifax, Nova Scotia
Rob Ainsley	Toronto, Ontario
Guy Algot	Sherwood Park, Alberta
Coard Allard	Morris, Manitoba
Ted Appelman	Edmonton, Alberta
Trevor Archibald	Halifax, Nova Scotia
Rob Atkins	Winnipeg, Manitoba
Felix Attinger	Dübendorf, Switzerland
Scott Bailey	Brampton, Ontario
Ray Baker	Dauphin, Manitoba
Kurt Balderston	Grande Prairie, Alberta
Travis Bale	Winnipeg, Manitoba
Greg Balsdon	Kingston, Ontario
Christian Bangerter	Bern, Switzerland
Mathieu Beaufort	Sorel-Tracy, Quebec
Ben Bevan	Whitby, Ontario
Mark Bice	Sarnia, Ontario
Jean Olivier Biechely	Lyon, France
Andrew Bilesky	New Westminster, British Columbia
Kent Bird	Abbotsford, British Columbia
Todd Birr	(United States) Blaine, Minnesota
Matthew Blandford	Lethbridge, Alberta
Greg Blyde	St. John's, Newfoundland and Labrador
Dimitri Boada	Geneva, Switzerland
David Bohn	Winnipeg, Manitoba
Dennis Bohn	Winnipeg, Manitoba
Adam Boland	St. John's, Newfoundland and Labrador
John Bolton	Lindsay, Ontario
Trevor Bonot	Thunder Bay, Ontario
Brendan Bottcher	Edmonton, Alberta
Derek Bowyer	Medicine Hat, Alberta
Doug Brewer	Cornwall, Ontario
Tom Brewster	Aberdeen, Scotland
Richard Brower	Richmond, British Columbia
Craig Brown	(United States) Blaine, Minnesota
Michael Brunner	Gstaad, Switzerland
Cameron Bryce	Borders, Scotland
Randy Bryden	Saskatoon, Saskatchewan
Bryan Burgess	Kakabeka Falls, Ontario
Mike Callaghan	Halifax, Nova Scotia
Braden Calvert	Winnipeg, Manitoba
Reid Carruthers	Winnipeg, Manitoba
Jordan Chandler	Sudbury, Ontario
Marc-Andre Chartrand	Rouyn-Noranda, Quebec
Brady Clark	(United States) Seattle, Washington
Hunter Clawson	(United States) Blaine, Minnesota
Bryan Cochrane	Russell, Ontario
Rene Comeau	Fredericton, New Brunswick
Joseph Comte	Winnipeg, Manitoba
Nicholas Connolly	(United States) Seattle, Washington
Brandon Corbett	(United States) Rochester, New York
Denis Cordick	Halton Hills, Ontario
Ryan Coy	Winnipeg, Manitoba
Wes Craig	Victoria, British Columbia
Warren Cross	Edmonton, Alberta
Adam Cseke	Kelowna, British Columbia
Brad Culp	High River, Alberta
Chad Dahlseide	Calgary, Alberta
Mitchell Dales	Saskatoon, Saskatchewan
Neil Dangerfield	Victoria, British Columbia
Timo Daniel	Basel, Switzerland
Peter de Cruz	Geneva, Switzerland
Nicholas Deagle	Halifax, Nova Scotia
Carl deConninck Smith	Saskatoon, Saskatchewan
Ryan Deis	Fox Valley, Saskatchewan
Antonio De Mollinedo	San Sebastián, Spain
Brent Dergousoff	Yorkton, Saskatchewan
Dayna Deruelle	Brampton, Ontario
Paul Dexter	Halifax, Nova Scotia
Grant Dezura	Maple Ridge, British Columbia
Ian Dickie	Newmarket, Ontario
Clint Dieno	Estevan, Saskatchewan
Jaap van Dorp	Zoetermeer, Netherlands
Colin Dow	Ottawa, Ontario
Stephen Dropkin	(United States) Minneapolis, Minnesota
Connor Duhaime	Barrie, Ontario
Matt Dunstone	Winnipeg, Manitoba
Kelsey Dusseault	Grande Prairie, Alberta
Niklas Edin	Karlstad, Sweden
John Epping	Toronto, Ontario
Gustav Eskilsson	Skellefteå, Sweden
David Falco	(United States) Denver, Colorado
Mike Farbelow	(United States) St. Paul, Minnesota
Dale Fellows	Spruce Grove, Alberta
Pete Fenson	(United States) Bemidji, Minnesota
Martin Ferland	Quebec City, Quebec
Pat Ferris	Grimsby, Ontario
Mike Flemming	Halifax, Nova Scotia
Hayden Forrester	Winnipeg, Manitoba
Kyle Foster	Arborg, Manitoba
Michael Fournier	Montreal, Quebec
Ally Fraser	Perth, Scotland
Rhett Friesz	Airdrie, Alberta
Hiromitsu Fujinaka	Okayama, Japan
Trevor Funk	Medicine Hat, Alberta
Hamish Gallacher	Dumfries, Scotland
Chris Gardner	Ajax, Ontario
Glenn Garneys	London, Ontario
Sean Geall	Kelowna, British Columbia
Brent Gedak	Estevan, Saskatchewan
Bob Genoway	Calgary, Alberta
Dale Gibbs	(United States) St. Paul, Minnesota
Ritchie Gillan	Ottawa, Ontario
Jeff Ginter	Dawson Creek, British Columbia
Chris Glibota	Sudbury, Ontario
Glen Godberson	Fort St. John, British Columbia
Robbie Gordon	Sudbury, Ontario
Sean Grassie	Winnipeg, Manitoba
James Grattan	Oromocto, New Brunswick
Brent Gray	Toronto, Ontario
Colin Griffith	Grande Prairie, Alberta
Martin Uhd Gronbech	Hvidovre, Denmark
Aleksandr Grzelka	Łódź, Poland
Randy Guidinger	Edmonton, Alberta
Jeff Guignard	Vancouver, British Columbia
Ritvars Gulbis	Riga, Latvia
Jason Gunnlaugson	Winnipeg, Manitoba
Brad Gushue	St. John's, Newfoundland and Labrador
Al Hackner	Thunder Bay, Ontario
Chris Haichert	Yellowknife, Northwest Territories
Mark Haluptzok	(United States) Bemidji, Minnesota
Scott Hamilton	Lockerbie, Scotland
Glen Hansen	Edmonton, Alberta
Grant Hardie	Dumfries, Scotland
Eric Harnden	Sault Ste. Marie, Ontario
Mike Harris	Toronto, Ontario
Tyler Harris	Charlottetown, Prince Edward Island
Jeff Hartung	Langenburg, Saskatchewan
Kody Hartung	Saskatoon, Saskatchewan
Jeremy Harty	Calgary, Alberta
Cory Heggestad	Derby Township, Ontario
Brad Heidt	Kerrobert, Saskatchewan
Drew Heidt	Kerrobert, Saskatchewan
Guy Hemmings	Sorel-Tracy, Quebec
Jan Hess	Zug, Switzerland
Yves Hess	Zürich, Switzerland
Jake Higgs	Ottawa, Ontario
Nick Hilton	Halifax, Nova Scotia
Kohsuke Hirata	Kitami, Japan
Timothy Hodek	(United States) Fargo, North Dakota
Marco Hösli	Switzerland
Mark Homan	Montreal, Quebec
Tanner Horgan	Copper Cliff, Ontario
Darryl Horsman	(United States) Tempe, Arizona
Will House	New Westminster, British Columbia
Glenn Howard	Penetanguishene, Ontario
Jeremy Hozjan	(United States) Charlotte, North Carolina
Kevin Hrab	Fort St. John, British Columbia
Jeremy Hrycenko	Arran, Saskatchewan
Colin Huber	Edmonton, Alberta
Mike Hutchings	Morinville, Alberta
Ryan Hyde	Portage la Prairie, Manitoba
Steve Irwin	Brandon, Manitoba
Kenji Iwasaki	Miyota, Japan
Bret Jackson	(United States) Milford, Michigan
Glen Jackson	Victoria, British Columbia
Matt Jackson	Halifax, Nova Scotia
Brad Jacobs	Sault Ste. Marie, Ontario
Jason Jacobson	Saskatoon, Saskatchewan
Willie Jamieson	Dumfries, Scotland
Mike Jantzen	Calgary, Alberta
Borys Jasiecki	Sopot, Poland
Dean Joanisse	New Westminster, British Columbia
Nils Johansson	(United States) Tempe, Arizona
Michael Johnson	Winnipeg, Manitoba
Rob Johnson	Calgary, Alberta
Dylan Johnston	Thunder Bay, Ontario
John Johnston	Toronto, Ontario
Ian Journeaux	(United States) St. Paul, Minnesota
Shawn Joyce	Saskatoon, Saskatchewan
Björn Jungen	Adelboden, Switzerland
Junpei Kanda	Tokyo, Japan
Andy Kapp	Hamburg, Germany
Arihito Kasahara	Tokyo, Japan
Aku Kauste	Helsinki, Finland
Mark Kean	Waterloo, Ontario
Mike Kennedy	Moncton, New Brunswick
Jordan Keon	Richmond Hill, Ontario
Kim Chang-min	Uiseong, South Korea
Kim Ho-gun	Uiseong, South Korea
Kim Min-woo	Seoul, South Korea
Kim Soo-hyuk	Gangwon Province, South Korea
Doug Kimmie	Taylor, British Columbia
Jamie King	Edmonton & Calgary, Alberta
Jordan Kiss	Abbotsford, British Columbia
Kyler Kleibrink	Calgary, Alberta
Rylan Kleiter	Saskatoon, Saskatchewan
Jamie Koe	Yellowknife, Northwest Territories
Kevin Koe	Calgary, Alberta
Colin Koivula	Thunder Bay, Ontario
Kenji Komoda	Kanagawa, Japan
Parker Konschuh	Edmonton, Alberta
Bruce Korte	Saskatoon, Saskatchewan
Richard Krell	Waterloo, Ontario
Karel Kubeska	Czech Republic
William Kuran	Winnipeg, Manitoba
Hiromitsu Kuriyama	Nagano, Japan
Steve Laycock	Saskatoon, Saskatchewan
Ryan LeDrew	Sarnia, Ontario
Alex Leichter	(United States) Boston, Massachusetts
Brian Lewis	Ottawa, Ontario
Liang Yi Hang	Shanghai, China
Mike Libbus	Black Diamond, Alberta
Kristian Lindström	Stockholm, Sweden
Duane Linton	Lower Sackville, Nova Scotia
Liu Rui	Harbin, China
Mick Lizmore	Calgary, Alberta
Lionel Locke	(United States) St. Louis Park, Minnesota
Trevor Loreth	Winnipeg, Manitoba
Lucien Lottenbach	Lucerne, Switzerland
William Lyburn	Winnipeg, Manitoba
Jordie Lyon-Hatcher	Waterloo, Ontario
Ma Xiu Yue	Harbin, China
Ewan MacDonald	Perth, Scotland
Alan Macdougall	Kent, England
Brent MacDougall	Halifax, Nova Scotia
Doug MacKenzie	Halifax, Nova Scotia
Eddie MacKenzie	Charlottetown, Prince Edward Island
Steve Mackey	Calgary, Alberta
Glen MacLeod	Halifax, Nova Scotia
Jeremy Mallais	Moncton, New Brunswick
Matt Mann	Sault Ste. Marie, Ontario
Matthew Manuel	Halifax, Nova Scotia
Kelly Marnoch	Carberry, Manitoba
Yannick Martel	Kenogami, Quebec
Kirk Massey	London, Ontario
Hayato Matsumura	Karuizawa, Japan
Codey Maus	Toronto, Ontario
Robert Mayhew	Halifax, Nova Scotia
Justin McBride	(United States) Anaheim, California
Curtis McCannell	Pilot Mound, Manitoba
Kyle McCannell	Winnipeg, Manitoba
Heath McCormick	(United States) Blaine, Minnesota
Matthew McCrady	New Westminster, British Columbia
Ryan McCrady	Ottawa, Ontario
Gary McCullough	Aurora, Ontario
Mike McEwen	Winnipeg, Manitoba
Taylor McIntyre	Winnipeg, Manitoba
Shaun Meachem	Regina, Saskatchewan
Tim Meadows	Thornhill, Ontario
Adrian Meikle	Hawarden, Wales
Florian Meister	Zürich, Switzerland
Jean-Michel Ménard	Gatineau, Quebec
Eirik Mjøen	Oslo, Norway
Tony Moore	Halifax, Nova Scotia
Pierre-Luc Morissette	Quebec City, Quebec
Yasuhiro Morita	Kyoto, Japan
Yusuke Morozumi	Karuizawa, Japan
John Morris	Vernon, British Columbia
Bruce Mouat	Edinburgh, Scotland
Butch Mouck	Minnedosa, Manitoba
Steven Munroe	Lévis, Quebec
Richard Muntain	Pinawa, Manitoba
Lucas Munuera	San Sebastian, Spain
David Murdoch	Stirling, Scotland
Hugh Murphy	Oakville, Ontario
Jamie Murphy	Halifax, Nova Scotia
Hideaki Nakamura	Okayama, Japan
Taiki Natsuizaka	Aomori, Japan
Jamie Newson	Charlottetown, Prince Edward Island
Mark Noseworthy	St. John's, Newfoundland and Labrador
Alan O'Leary	Dartmouth, Nova Scotia
Terry Odishaw	Moncton, New Brunswick
Ryo Ogihara	Karuizawa, Japan
Eren Oleson	Winnipeg, Manitoba
Ty Olson	Estevan, Saskatchewan
Derek Oryniak	Winnipeg, Manitoba
Weston Oryniak	Winnipeg, Manitoba
Fritz Oswald	Urdorf, Switzerland
Kevin Park	Calgary, Alberta
Daley Peters	Winnipeg, Manitoba
Jordan Peters	Morris, Manitoba
Tyler Pfeiffer	Edmonton, Alberta
Marc Pfister	Adelboden, Switzerland
Brent Pierce	Whitehorse, Yukon
Rico Pleisch	Bulgaria
Graham Powell	Grande Prairie, Alberta
Scott Ramsay	Winnipeg, Manitoba
Magnus Ramsfjell	Jar, Norway
Tomi Rantamaki	Hyvinkaa, Finland
Rob Retchless	Toronto, Ontario
Joel Retornaz	Trentino, Italy
Justin Reynolds	Winnipeg Beach, Manitoba
Cameron Rittenour	(United States) Sioux Falls, South Dakota
Jason Roach	Saint John, New Brunswick
Kurt Roach	Sydney, Nova Scotia
Sebastien Robillard	Ottawa, Ontario
Mike Robinson	Dartmouth, Nova Scotia
Roland Robinson	Edmonton, Alberta
Shawn Rojeski	(United States) Eveleth, Minnesota
Brent Ross	Harriston, Ontario
JT Ryan	Winnipeg, Manitoba
Kevin Saccary	Halifax, Nova Scotia
Mike Sali	Calgary, Alberta
Scott Saunders	Bridgewater & Lunenburg, Nova Scotia
Brady Scharback	Saskatoon, Saskatchewan
Stephen Schneider	Vancouver & Vernon, British Columbia
Andrin Schnider	Schaffhausen, Switzerland
Brad Schroeder	Camrose, Alberta
Dwayne Schultz	Edmonton, Alberta
Yannick Schwaller	Bern, Switzerland
Kim-Lloyd Sciboz	Lausanne, Switzerland
Thomas Scoffin	Edmonton, Alberta
Kieran Scott	Guelph, Ontario
Tom Scott	(United States) Hibbing, Minnesota
Daryl Shane	Waterloo, Ontario
Randie Shen	(Chinese Taipei) Taipei
John Shoesmith	(United States) Seattle, Washington
John Shuster	(United States) Duluth, Minnesota
Aaron Shutra	Saskatoon, Saskatchewan
Lyle Sieg	(United States) Seattle, Washington
Mike Siggins	(United States) Phoenix, Arizona
Steen Sigurdson	Winnipeg, Manitoba
David Sik	Prague, Czech Republic
Graham Sloan	Dumfries, Scotland
Aaron Sluchinski	Airdrie, Alberta
Bob Smallwood	Whitehorse, Yukon
Spencer Smith	Fredericton, New Brunswick
Greg Smith	St. John's, Newfoundland and Labrador
Jordan Smith	Winnipeg, Manitoba
Kyle Smith	Stirling, Scotland
Matthew Smith	St. John's, Newfoundland and Labrador
Tucker Smith	(United States) Bismarck, North Dakota
Jiří Snítil	Prague, Czech Republic
Darryl Sobering	(United States) Denver, Colorado
Jon Solberg	Whitehorse, Yukon
Jon St. Denis	Stouffville, Ontario
John Steel	High River, Alberta
Chad Stevens	Halifax, Nova Scotia
Brayden Stewart	Saskatoon, Saskatchewan
Jeffrey Stewart	Montreal, Quebec
Rasmus Stjerne	Hvidovre, Denmark
Andrew Stopera	(United States) New York City, New York
Bill Stopera	(United States) New York City, New York
John Stroh	Medicine Hat, Alberta
Alexey Stukalskiy	Moscow, Russia
Karsten Sturmay	Edmonton, Alberta
Dave Sullivan	Saint John, New Brunswick
Gaku Suzuki	Sapporo, Japan
Krystof Tabery	Prague, Czech Republic
Yuya Takigahira	Sapporo, Japan
Wayne Tallon	Fredericton, New Brunswick
Cody Tanaka	Delta, British Columbia
Tyler Tardi	Langley, British Columbia
Andrew Taylor	St. John's, Newfoundland and Labrador
Stuart Taylor	Forfar, Scotland
Chay Telfer	Glasgow, Scotland
Charley Thomas	Edmonton, Alberta
Colin Thomas	St. John's, Newfoundland and Labrador
Jeff Thomas	St. John's, Newfoundland and Labrador
Randal Thomas	Winnipeg, Manitoba
Kendal Thompson	Halifax, Nova Scotia
Stuart Thompson	Halifax, Nova Scotia
Gobias Thune	Gentofte, Denmark
Alexey Timofeev	Moscow, Russia
Suguru Tsukamoto	Kanagawa, Japan
Wayne Tuck Jr.	Brantford, Ontario
Thomas Ulsrud	Oslo, Norway
Kazuhisa Unoura	Osaka, Japan
Thomas Usselman	Calgary, Alberta
Chris Van Huyse	Uxbridge, Ontario
Brett Vavrek	Grande Prairie, Alberta
Darrel Veiner	Dawson Creek, British Columbia
Damien Villard	Cambridge, Ontario
Shane Vollman	Regina, Saskatchewan
Yves Wagenseil	Dübendorf, Switzerland
Adela Walczak	Kraków, Poland
Steffen Walstad	Oslo, Norway
Mark Walter	Estevan, Saskatchewan
Harold Walters	St. John's, Newfoundland and Labrador
Wang Fengchun	Harbin, China
Tyler Waterhouse	Carberry, Manitoba
Stephen Watson	Ottawa, Ontario
Spencer Watts	Moncton, New Brunswick
Scott Webb	Peace River, Alberta
Daniel Wenzek	New Westminster, British Columbia
Wade White	Edmonton, Alberta
Andrew Wickman	Winnipeg, Manitoba
Chris Wimmer	Stroud, Ontario
Neal Woloschuk	Edmonton, Alberta
Evan Workin	(United States) Fargo, North Dakota
Sebastian Wunderer	Kitzbühel, Austria
Kevin Wunderlin	Biel/Bienne, Switzerland
Kevin Yablonski	Calgary, Alberta
Matt Yeo	Edmonton, Alberta
Nathan Young	St. John's, Newfoundland and Labrador
Michal Zdenka	Prague, Czech Republic
Zhang Tian Yu	Harbin, China

== Women ==
Updated December 21, 2016

Skip	Locale
Kristina Adams	Ennismore, Ontario
Melissa Adams	Fredericton, New Brunswick
Gina Aitken	Edinburgh, Scotland
Karina Aitken	Stirling, Scotland
Hanna Anderson	Saskatoon, Saskatchewan
Sherry Anderson	Delisle, Saskatchewan
Frederica Apollonio	Cortina d'Ampezzo, Italy
Meghan Armit	Winnipeg, Manitoba
Mary-Anne Arsenault	Halifax, Nova Scotia
Rebecca Atkinson	Moncton, New Brunswick
Cathy Auld	Toronto, Ontario
Coralie Ayre	Sydney, Nova Scotia
Nicole Backe	Nanaimo, British Columbia
Holly Baird	Edmonton, Alberta
Maria Baksheeva	Saint Petersburg, Russia
Emily Ball	Lower Sackville, Nova Scotia
Megan Balsdon	Toronto, Ontario
Brett Barber	Biggar, Saskatchewan
Melanie Barbezat	Biel/Bienne, Switzerland
Penny Barker	Moose Jaw, Saskatchewan
Rebecca Bartz	Edmonton, Alberta
Madison Bear	(United States) Blaine, Minnesota
Ève Bélisle	Montreal, Quebec
Celeste Bellefeuille	Ottawa, Ontario
Hayley Bergman	Morris, Manitoba
Cheryl Bernard	Calgary, Alberta
Ieva Berzina	Riga, Latvia
Shannon Birchard	Winnipeg, Manitoba
Santa Blumberga	Riga, Latvia
Kaitlyn Bowman	Saskatoon, Saskatchewan
Theresa Breen	Halifax, Nova Scotia
Madara Bremane	Riga, Latvia
Jill Brothers	Halifax, Nova Scotia
Corryn Brown	Kamloops, New Westminster & Nanaimo, British Columbia
Joelle Brown	Winnipeg, Manitoba
Chantal Bugnon	Dubendorf, Switzerland
Laura Burtnyk	Winnipeg, Manitoba
Rachel Burtnyk	Winnipeg, Manitoba
Chrissy Cadorin	Toronto, Ontario
Jolene Campbell	Regina, Saskatchewan
Chelsea Carey	Calgary, Alberta
Kathy Chittley-Young	Dundas, Ontario
Cory Christensen	(United States) Blaine, Minnesota
Nadine Chyz	Calgary, Alberta
Cristin Clark	(United States) Seattle, Washington
Kristin Clarke	Chester, Nova Scotia
Kelly Cochrane	Toronto, Ontario
Shiella Cowan	Surrey, British Columbia
Stacie Curtis	St. John's, Newfoundland and Labrador
Calissa Daly	Halifax, Nova Scotia
Sarah Daniels	New Westminster & Delta, British Columbia
Janias DeJong	Edmonton, Alberta
Ayssa Despins	Saskatoon, Saskatchewan
Jackie Dewar	Winnipeg, Manitoba
Laurie Donaher	Moncton, New Brunswick
Annmarie Dubberstein	(United States) Blaine, Minnesota
Kelsey Dutton	Swift Current, Saskatchewan
Cheryl Eason	(United States) Sacramento, California
Chantelle Eberle	Regina, Saskatchewan
Kerri Einarson	Winnipeg, Manitoba
Melanie Ellis	Halifax, Nova Scotia
Michelle Englot	Winnipeg, Manitoba
Binia Feltscher	Flims, Switzerland
Cierra Fisher	Kamloops, British Columbia
Allison Flaxey	Caledon, Ontario
Hannah Fleming	Lockerbie, Scotland
Tracy Fleury	Sudbury, Ontario
Karynn Flory	Edmonton, Alberta
Stacey Fordyce	Brandon, Manitoba
Susan Froud	Beeton, Ontario
Satsuki Fujisawa	Kitami, Japan
Kerry Galusha	Yellowknife, Northwest Territories
Christie Gamble	Halifax, Nova Scotia
Gao Xue Song	Harbin, China
Courtney Gilder	Cookstown, Ontario
Gim Un-chi	Gyeonggi Province, South Korea
Lisa Gisler	Bern, Switzerland
Mackenzie Glynn	St. John's, Newfoundland and Labrador
Brooke Godsland	St. John's, Newfoundland and Labrador
Shelly Graham	Fredericton, New Brunswick
Diane Gushulak	Vancouver, British Columbia
Kayte Gyles	Cloverdale, British Columbia
Heidi Hanlon	Saint John, New Brunswick
Jacquie Harrison	Mississauga, Ontario
Michelle Hartwell	Edmonton, Alberta
Janet Harvey	Winnipeg, Manitoba
Anna Hasselborg	Sundbyberg, Sweden
Julie Hastings	Thornhill, Ontario
Heather Heggestad	Thornhill, Ontario
Ursi Hegner	Uzwil, Switzerland
Kellie Henricks	Edmonton, Alberta
Shayler Herman	Medicine Hat, Alberta
Krysta Hilker	Edmonton, Alberta
Brenda Holloway	Guelph, Ontario
Rachel Homan	Ottawa, Ontario
Lindsay Hudyma	Vancouver / Victoria, British Columbia
Natalie Hughes	Ontario
Danielle Inglis	Ottawa, Ontario
Sophie Jackson	Dumfries, Scotland
Virginia Jackson	Halifax, Nova Scotia
Daniela Jentsch	Füssen, Germany
Lysa Johnson	(United States) St. Paul, Minnesota
Colleen Jones	Halifax, Nova Scotia
Jennifer Jones	Winnipeg, Manitoba
Kaitlyn Jones	Regina, Saskatchewan
Nicky Kaufman	Edmonton, Alberta
Oona Kauste	Hyvinkää, Finland
Mallory Kean	Kitchener, Ontario
Colleen Kilgallen	East St. Paul, Manitoba
Kim Eun-jung	Uiseong, South Korea
Kim Ji-suk	Jeonbuk, South Korea
Kim Min-ji	Gyeonggi Province, South Korea
Kim Su-ji	Chuncheon, South Korea
Cathy King	Edmonton, Alberta
Chaelynn Kitz	Saskatoon, Saskatchewan
Shannon Kleibrink	Okotoks, Alberta
Tori Koana	Yamanashi, Japan
Sarah Koltun	Whitehorse, Yukon
Anna Kubeskova	Prague, Czech Republic
Isabelle Ladouceur	Lower Sackville, Nova Scotia
Jasmin Lander	Hvidovre, Denmark
Marie-France Larouche	Lévis, Quebec
Stefanie Lawton	Saskatoon, Saskatchewan
Stephanie LeDrew	Sarnia, Ontario
Cassandra Lewin	Ottawa, Ontario
Marie-Elaine Little	Ottawa, Ontario
Towe Lundman	Uppsala, Sweden
Erin Macaulay	Ottawa, Ontario
Kristen MacDiarmid	Dartmouth, Nova Scotia
Robyn MacPhee	Charlottetown, Prince Edward Island
Isabelle Maillard	Uitikon, Switzerland
Lindsay Makichuk	Edmonton, Alberta
Sarah Mallais	Saint John, New Brunswick
Marla Mallett	Walnut Grove, British Columbia
Anne Malmi	Hyvinkää, Finland
Jodi Marthaller	Lethbridge, Alberta
Nancy Martin	Saskatoon, Saskatchewan
Alisha Mathis	Schaffhausen, Switzerland
Chiaki Matsumura	Karuizawa, Japan
Mary Mattatall	Halifax, Nova Scotia
Cheryl McBain	Ottawa, Ontario
Krista McCarville	Thunder Bay, Ontario
Nancy McConnery	Dartmouth, Nova Scotia
Deb McCreanor	La Salle, Manitoba
Julie McEvoy	Halifax, Nova Scotia
Janet McGhee	Uxbridge, Ontario
Carina McKay-Saturino	Dartmouth, Nova Scotia
Tiffany McLean	Dauphin, Manitoba
Breanne Meakin	Regina, Saskatchewan
Mei Jie	Harbin, China
Briane Meilleur	Winnipeg, Manitoba
Lisa Menard	Dauphin, Manitoba
Sherry Middaugh	Coldwater, Ontario
Jessica Mitchell	Saskatoon, Saskatchewan
Victorya Moiseeva	Kaliningrad, Russia
Maile Mölder	Tallinn, Estonia
Lisa Moore	Halifax, Nova Scotia
Katie Moreau	Penetanguishene, Ontario
Erin Morrissey	Ottawa, Ontario
Eve Muirhead	Perth, Scotland
Heather Munn	Saint John, New Brunswick
Kate Murphy	St. John's, Newfoundland and Labrador
Carol Ann Naso	(United States) Tempe, Arizona
Mayu Natsuizaka	Sapporo, Japan
Jenn Nguyen	(United States) Denver, Colorado
Deanne Nichol	Edmonton, Alberta
Hollie Nicol	Ottawa, Ontario
Lene Nielsen	Hvidovre, Denmark
Denise Nowlan	Moncton, New Brunswick
Norma O'Leary	(United States) Duluth, Minnesota
Ayumi Ogasawara	Sapporo, Japan
Cathy Overton-Clapham	Winnipeg, Manitoba
Alina Pätz	Zürich, Switzerland
Alina Pavlyuchik	Minsk, Belarus
Roxane Perron	Quebec City, Quebec
Samantha Peters	Ottawa, Ontario
Beth Peterson	Winnipeg, Manitoba
Dailene Pewarchuk	Victoria, British Columbia
Tanya Phillips	Halifax, Nova Scotia
Colleen Pinkney	Truro, Nova Scotia
Julia Pitcherr	St. John's, Newfoundland and Labrador
Cassandra Potter	(United States) St. Paul, Minnesota
Stephanie Prinse	Chilliwack, British Columbia
Emily Quello	(United States) Bemidji, Minnesota
Geri-Lynn Ramsay	Calgary, Alberta
Cheryl Reed	Brandon, Manitoba
Rebecca Roberts	St. John's, Newfoundland and Labrador
Darcy Robertson	Winnipeg, Manitoba
Sylvie Robichaud	Moncton, New Brunswick
Kelsey Rocque	Edmonton, Alberta
Nina Roth	(United States) McFarland, Wisconsin
Melissa Runing	(United States) North Mankato, Minnesota
Amanda Russett	Kamloops, British Columbia
Bobbie Sauder	Spruce Grove, Alberta
Casey Scheidegger	Lethbridge, Alberta
Danielle Schmiemann	Edmonton, Alberta
Kim Schneider	Kronau, Saskatchewan
Andrea Schöpp	Garmisch, Germany
Jessica Schultz	(United States) St. Paul, Minnesota
Holly Scott	Edmonton, Alberta
Mandy Selzer	Balgonie, Saskatchewan
Marla Sherrer	Lacombe, Alberta
Kelly Shimizu	Richmond, British Columbia
Anna Sidorova	Moscow, Russia
Margaretha Sigfridsson	Skellefteå, Sweden
Robyn Silvernagle	North Battleford, Saskatchewan
Jamie Sinclair	(United States) Blaine, Minnesota
Kristin Moen Skaslien	Oslo, Norway
Kayla Skrlik	Falher, Alberta
Kim Slattery	Vernon, British Columbia
Hazel Smith	Hamilton, Scotland
Veronica Smith	Charlottetown, Prince Edward Island
Charlene Sobering	Ottawa, Ontario
Barb Spencer	Winnipeg, Manitoba
Iveta Staša-Šaršūne	Riga, Latvia
Elena Stern	Wetzikon, Switzerland
Kristen Streifel	Edmonton, Alberta
Heather Strong	St. John's, Newfoundland and Labrador
Selena Sturmay	Airdrie, Alberta
Su Chang	Shanghai, China
Valerie Sweeting	Edmonton, Alberta
Marta Szeliga-Frynia	Kraków, Poland
Yui Tanaka	Aomori, Japan
Shannon Tatlock	Moncton, New Brunswick
Karla Thompson	Kamloops, British Columbia
Julie Tippin	Woodstock, Ontario
Silvana Tirinzoni	Zürich, Switzerland
Terry Ursel	Arden, Manitoba
Kesa Van Osch	Nanaimo, British Columbia
Kalynn Virtue	Lethbridge, Alberta
Wang Bingyu	Harbin, China
Sarah Wark	Chilliwack, British Columbia
Kristy Watling	Winnipeg, Manitoba
Ashley Waye	Toronto, Ontario
Selina Witschonke	Luzern, Switzerland
Isabella Wranå	Sundbyberg, Sweden
Sae Yamamoto	Karuizawa, Japan
Yang Ying	Harbin, China
Dilşat Yıldız	Erzurum, Turkey
Zheng Chunmei	Harbin, China
Nola Zingel	Lloydminster, Alberta
