= Vosnesenya =

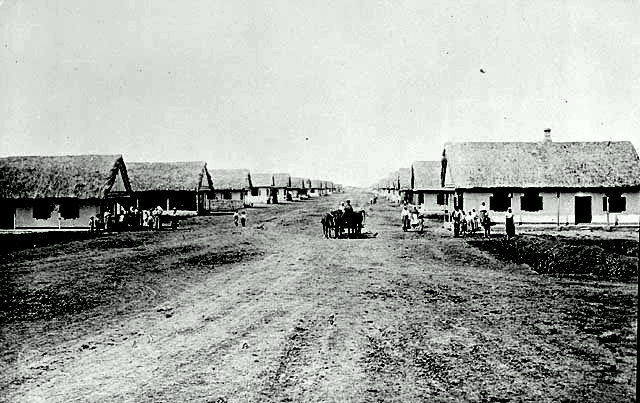
The Doukhobor settlement of Vosnesenya, on the Swan River north-east of Arran, in the early 1900s.

Vosnesenya, (also known as Visnesinia) is a former Doukhobor settlement in Livingston Rural Municipality No. 331, Saskatchewan, Canada, north-east of the village of Arran along the Swan River.

The area around Vosnesenya was part of the "North Reserve", or the "Thunder Hill Reserve", one of the block settlement areas allocated for the Doukhobor immigrants who arrived here in 1899 from Russia's Transcaucasian provinces.

== See also ==
- List of communities in Saskatchewan
- Doukhobor Russian
- Block settlement
- Doukhobor
