= Rural Municipality of Hazel Dell No. 335 =

Rural municipality in Saskatchewan, Canada

Hazel Dell No. 335
- Rural municipality
- Rural Municipality of Hazel Dell No. 335

- Location of the RM of Hazel Dell No. 335 in Saskatchewan
- Coordinates: 52.098°N 103.100°W
- Country: Canada
- Province: Saskatchewan
- Census division: 9
- SARM division: 4
- Formed: January 1, 1913

Government
  - Reeve: Randall Harriman
  - Governing body: RM of Hazel Dell No. 335 Council
  - Administrator: Michael Rattray
  - Office location: Okla

Area (2016)
  - Land: 1,394.02 km^{2} (538.23 sq mi)

Population (2016)
  - Total: 515
  - Density: 0.4/km^{2} (1.0/sq mi)
- Time zone: CST
  - Summer (DST): CST
- Area codes: 306 and 639

The Rural Municipality of Hazel Dell No. 335 (2016 population: 515) is a rural municipality (RM) in the Canadian province of Saskatchewan within Census Division No. 9 and SARM Division No. 4.

== History ==
The RM of Hazel Dell No. 335 incorporated as a rural municipality on January 1, 1913.

== Geography ==
=== Communities and localities ===
The following urban municipalities are surrounded by the RM.

Villages

- Lintlaw

The following unincorporated communities are within the RM.

Organized hamlets

- Hazel Dell
- Okla

Localities

- Lone Spruce
- Rockford
- Stove Creek

== Demographics ==
Population history (1981–2016)
Year	Pop.	±%
1981	1,143	—
1986	1,070	−6.4%
1991	903	−15.6%
1996	796	−11.8%
2001	710	−10.8%
2006	611	−13.9%
2011	511	−16.4%
2016	515	+0.8%
Source: Statistics Canada via Saskatchewan Bureau of Statistics

In the 2021 Census of Population conducted by Statistics Canada, the RM of Hazel Dell No. 335 had a population of 511 living in 229 of its 275 total private dwellings, a change of −0.8% from its 2016 population of 515. With a land area of 1,358.45 km^{2} (524.50 sq mi), it had a population density of 0.4/km^{2} (1.0/sq mi) in 2021.

In the 2016 Census of Population, the RM of Hazel Dell No. 335 recorded a population of 515 living in 235 of its 288 total private dwellings, a 0.8% change from its 2011 population of 511. With a land area of 1,394.02 km^{2} (538.23 sq mi), it had a population density of 0.4/km^{2} (1.0/sq mi) in 2016.

== Attractions ==
- Porcupine Provincial Forest

== Government ==
The RM of Hazel Dell No. 335 is governed by an elected municipal council and an appointed administrator that meets on the second Wednesday of every month. The reeve of the RM is Randall Harriman while its administrator is Michael Rattray. The RM's office is located in Okla.

== Transportation ==
- Saskatchewan Highway 49
- Saskatchewan Highway 617
- Saskatchewan Highway 753
- Saskatchewan Highway 755

== See also ==
- List of rural municipalities in Saskatchewan
