= Rural Municipality of St. Philips No. 301 =

Rural municipality in Saskatchewan, Canada

St. Philips No. 301
- Rural municipality
- Rural Municipality of St. Philips No. 301
- Location of the RM of St. Philips No. 301 in Saskatchewan
- Coordinates: 51.723°N 101.919°W
- Country: Canada
- Province: Saskatchewan
- Census division: 9
- SARM division: 4
- Formed: January 1, 1913

Government
  - Reeve: vacant
  - Governing body: RM of St. Philips No. 301 Council
  - Administrator: Frances Olson
  - Office location: Pelly

Area (2016)
  - Land: 655.78 km^{2} (253.20 sq mi)

Population (2016)
  - Total: 220
  - Density: 0.3/km^{2} (0.78/sq mi)
- Time zone: CST
  - Summer (DST): CST
- Area codes: 306 and 639

The Rural Municipality of St. Philips No. 301 (2016 population: 220) is a rural municipality (RM) in the Canadian province of Saskatchewan within Census Division No. 9 and SARM Division No. 4.

== History ==
The RM of St. Philips No. 301 incorporated as a rural municipality on January 1, 1913.

== Geography ==
=== Communities and localities ===
The following urban municipalities are surrounded by the RM.

Villages

- Pelly

== Demographics ==
Population history (1981–2016)
Year	Pop.	±%
1981	538	—
1986	486	−9.7%
1991	402	−17.3%
1996	331	−17.7%
2001	295	−10.9%
2006	258	−12.5%
2011	235	−8.9%
2016	220	−6.4%
Source: Statistics Canada via Saskatchewan Bureau of Statistics

In the 2021 Census of Population conducted by Statistics Canada, the RM of St. Philips No. 301 had a population of 200 living in 94 of its 151 total private dwellings, a change of −9.1% from its 2016 population of 220. With a land area of 647.8 km^{2} (250.1 sq mi), it had a population density of 0.3/km^{2} (0.8/sq mi) in 2021.

In the 2016 Census of Population, the RM of St. Philips No. 301 recorded a population of 220 living in 98 of its 152 total private dwellings, a −6.4% change from its 2011 population of 235. With a land area of 655.78 km^{2} (253.20 sq mi), it had a population density of 0.3/km^{2} (0.9/sq mi) in 2016.

== Attractions ==
- Madge Lake
- Fort Pelly
- Duck Mountain Provincial Park

== Government ==
The RM of St. Philips No. 301 is governed by an elected municipal council and an appointed administrator that meets on the third Thursday of every month. The reeve position is vacant while the RM's administrator is Frances Olson. The RM's office is located in Pelly.

== Transportation ==
- Canadian National Railway
- Saskatchewan Highway 8
- Saskatchewan Highway 49

== See also ==
- List of rural municipalities in Saskatchewan
