= Cote First Nation =

Saulteaux First Nations band government in Canada

- Band No. 366
- Band symbol
- People: Saulteaux
- Treaty: Treaty 4
- Headquarters: Kamsack
- Province: Saskatchewan

Land
- Other reserve: Cote 64
- Land area: 80.882 km^{2} (31.229 sq mi)

Population (2019)
- On reserve: 1074
- Off reserve: 2987
- Total population: 4061

Government
- Chief: George Cote

Tribal Council
- Yorkton Tribal Council

Website
- cotefirstnation.ca

The Cote First Nation (Western Ojibwa: Ininī-otōškanink, "Man's Elbow") is a Saulteaux First Nations band government in Kamsack, Saskatchewan. This Saulteaux reserve is connected to the Keeseekoose First Nation and only a couple of miles from the Key First Nation. Their land is situated just south of the boreal forest in the aspen parkland ecosystem of Canada. The Ojibwe of this region of Saskatchewan and Manitoba were both hunters of the plains bison and hunters of the forests which were more abundant during the 19th century. They also fished the endless lakes and other waterways in the land. They seldom went hungry as a result of the large bison herds. However, by the 1870s, commercial hunting had reduced the bison to near extinction and the Ojibwe of Saskatchewan and Manitoba began to suffer from famine.

== History ==
Historically, the people of Cote have lived in Saskatchewan and neighbouring Manitoba, for at least 250 to 300 years. After the Europeans arrived, it forced many Ojibwe people to retreat towards the west as well as to the north. By the late 19th century the Europeans had made their way into the eastern Saskatchewan region and then commenced to negotiate with Cote leaders. Among them was Chief MīMīY (Gabriel Coté, Mee-may, Pigeon), who signed Treaty 4 on September 15, 1874. A reserve was surveyed in 1877. It established the Cote First Nation and then eventually the Keeseekoose First Nation which was originally a part of the Swan River First Nation of Manitoba, before floods commenced and forced a relocation. It is not known if the Ojibwe people of eastern Saskatchewan participated in the 1885 North-West Rebellion but their land was quite far from the major battle scenes of the conflict. The Cote Ojibweg were probably affiliated with Chief Yellow Quill and also Chief Kinistin during the 19th century. In September 2024, they became a signatory to the Buffalo Treaty.

=== Reserves ===
Cote was originally a larger reserve connected to the Keeseekoose First Nation. Today the Cote have one reserve of 8,088 hectares (19,990 acres) and share Treaty Four Reserve Grounds Indian Reserve No. 77 with 33 other Treaty 4 First Nations. The Cote First Nation is a member of the Yorkton Tribal Council whose offices are located in Yorkton.

=== Membership ===
As of September, 2013 there were 3,616 registered members with 904 members living on-reserve and 2,712 members living off-reserve.

=== Chiefs ===
Antoine "Tony" Cote (1935 - July 31, 2019) was "elected Chief of Cote for a period of 8 years" (1970–78) and was responsible for building an arena on the reserve and the inception of the first Saskatchewan Indian Summer Games in 1974, the first all Indian Junior B Hockey Team, first all Indian Oldtimers Hockey Team and in 1980 is recorded as Treasurer of the Federation of Saskatchewan Indians. He is the recipient of the Saskatchewan Order of Merit, was inducted into the Saskatchewan Sports Hall of Fame (2011) and was the winner of the Tom Longboat Award for Saskatchewan in 1974. The Saskatchewan First Nations Summer Games were renamed the Tony Cote Summer Games in his honour.
