= Keeseekoose 66-KE-05 =

Indian reserve in Saskatchewan, Canada

Coordinates: 51°43′51″N 102°15′08″W

- Indian reserve
- Keeseekoose Indian Reserve No. 66-KE-05
- Location in Saskatchewan
- First Nation: Keeseekoose
- Country: Canada
- Province: Saskatchewan

Area
  - Total: 258.1 ha (638 acres)

Population (2016)
  - Total: 5
  - Density: 1.9/km^{2} (5.0/sq mi)

Keeseekoose 66-KE-05 is an Indian reserve of the Keeseekoose First Nation in Saskatchewan. It is about 19 kilometres (12 mi) north-east of Canora. In the 2016 Canadian Census, it recorded a population of 5 living in 1 of its 2 total private dwellings.

== See also ==
- List of Indian reserves in Saskatchewan
