= 2016–17 curling season =

- Sport: Curling

Seasons
- ← 2015–16 2017–18 →

The 2016–17 curling season began in August 2016 and ended in April 2017.

Note: In events with two genders, the men's tournament winners will be listed before the women's tournament winners.

== Curling Canada sanctioned events ==
This section lists events sanctioned by and/or conducted by Curling Canada (formerly the Canadian Curling Association). The following events in bold have been confirmed by Curling Canada as are part of the 2016–17 Season of Champions programme.

Event	Winning team	Runner-up team
Canadian Mixed Curling Championship; Yarmouth, Nova Scotia, Nov. 14–19	Northern Ontario	Manitoba
Travelers Curling Club Championship; Kelowna, British Columbia, Nov. 20–26	Ontario	Saskatchewan
Travelers Curling Club Championship; Kelowna, British Columbia, Nov. 20–26	Manitoba	Alberta
**Canada Cup**; Brandon, Manitoba, Nov. 30–Dec. 4	(Manitoba) Reid Carruthers	(Newfoundland and Labrador) Brad Gushue
**Canada Cup**; Brandon, Manitoba, Nov. 30–Dec. 4	(Manitoba) Jennifer Jones	(Ontario) Rachel Homan
**Continental Cup of Curling**; Paradise, Nevada, Jan. 12–15	(Canada) (United States) Team North America	(United Nations) Team World
**Canadian Junior Curling Championships**; Victoria, British Columbia, Jan. 21–29	British Columbia	Ontario
**Canadian Junior Curling Championships**; Victoria, British Columbia, Jan. 21–29	Alberta	Ontario
**Tournament of Hearts**; St. Catharines, Ontario, Feb. 18–26	Ontario	Manitoba
**Tim Hortons Brier**; St. John's, Newfoundland and Labrador, Mar. 4–12	Newfoundland and Labrador	Canada
U Sports/Curling Canada University Championships; Thunder Bay, Ontario, Mar. 18–22	(Newfoundland and Labrador) Memorial Sea-Hawks	Alberta Golden Bears
U Sports/Curling Canada University Championships; Thunder Bay, Ontario, Mar. 18–22	(Ontario) Laurentian Voyageurs	(Ontario) Lakehead Thunderwolves
Canadian Senior Curling Championship; Fredericton, New Brunswick, Mar. 20–25	Alberta	Ontario
Canadian Senior Curling Championship; Fredericton, New Brunswick, Mar. 20–25	Saskatchewan	Ontario
CCAA Curling National Championships; Camrose, Alberta, Mar. 22–25	(Ontario) Fanshawe Falcons	(Ontario) Mohawk Mountaineers
CCAA Curling National Championships; Camrose, Alberta, Mar. 22–25	(Alberta) Red Deer Queens	(Alberta) Concordia Thunder
**World Men's Curling Championship**; Edmonton, Alberta, Apr. 1–9	Canada	Sweden
Canadian Masters Curling Championships; Guelph, Ontario, Apr. 3-9	Northern Ontario	Alberta
Canadian Masters Curling Championships; Guelph, Ontario, Apr. 3-9	Saskatchewan	Ontario
Canadian Mixed Doubles Curling Trials; Saskatoon, Saskatchewan, Apr. 5-9	(Alberta) (Manitoba) Joanne Courtney/Reid Carruthers	(Ontario) (Alberta) Rachel Homan/John Morris
Canadian Under-18 Curling Championship; Moncton, New Brunswick Apr. 18-22	Northern Ontario	Nova Scotia
Canadian Under-18 Curling Championship; Moncton, New Brunswick Apr. 18-22	Northern Ontario	New Brunswick
Canadian Wheelchair Curling Championship; Boucherville, Quebec, Apr. 24-30	Manitoba	Alberta

== Other events ==
Note: Events that have not been placed on Curling Canada's list of sanctioned events are listed here. If an event is listed on Curling Canada's final list for the 2016–17 curling season, it will be moved up to the "Curling Canada-sanctioned events" section.

Event	Winning team		Runner-up team
World Mixed Curling Championship; Kazan, Russia, Oct. 15–22	Russia		Sweden
Pacific-Asia Curling Championships; Uiseong, South Korea, Nov. 6–12	Japan		China
Pacific-Asia Curling Championships; Uiseong, South Korea, Nov. 6–12	South Korea		China
World Wheelchair Curling B-Championship; Lohja, Finland, Nov. 4–11	Finland		Scotland
European Curling Championships; Braehead, Scotland, Nov. 18–26	A	Sweden	Norway
European Curling Championships; Braehead, Scotland, Nov. 18–26	A	Russia	Sweden
European Curling Championships; Braehead, Scotland, Nov. 18–26	B	Netherlands	Slovakia
European Curling Championships; Braehead, Scotland, Nov. 18–26	B	Hungary	Turkey
World Junior B Curling Championships; Östersund, Sweden Jan. 3–9	China		Turkey
World Junior B Curling Championships; Östersund, Sweden Jan. 3–9	Scotland		Turkey
Americas Challenge; Duluth, Minnesota, Jan. 27–29	United States		Brazil
Americas Challenge; Duluth, Minnesota, Jan. 27–29	United States		Brazil
Pinty's All-Star Curling Skins Game; Banff, Alberta, Feb. 3–5	Team Kevin Koe		Team Brad Jacobs
Pinty's All-Star Curling Skins Game; Banff, Alberta, Feb. 3–5	Team Jennifer Jones		Team Valerie Sweeting
Winter Universiade; Almaty, Kazakhstan, Jan. 29–Feb. 8	Great Britain		Sweden
Winter Universiade; Almaty, Kazakhstan, Jan. 29–Feb. 8	Canada		Russia
World Junior Curling Championships; Pyeongchang, South Korea, Feb. 16–26	South Korea		United States
World Junior Curling Championships; Pyeongchang, South Korea, Feb. 16–26	Sweden		Scotland
World Wheelchair Curling Championship; Pyeongchang, South Korea, Mar. 4–11	Norway		Russia
World Women's Curling Championship; Beijing, China, Mar. 18–26	Canada		Russia
World Senior Curling Championships; Lethbridge, Alberta, Canada Apr. 22–29	Sweden		Canada
World Senior Curling Championships; Lethbridge, Alberta, Canada Apr. 22–29	Canada		Switzerland
World Mixed Doubles Curling Championship; Lethbridge, Alberta, Canada, Apr. 22–29	Switzerland		Canada
2017 European Curling Championships – Group C Andorra, May. 6 – May 13	C	Spain	France
2017 European Curling Championships – Group C Andorra, May. 6 – May 13	C	Spain	Poland

== World Curling Tour ==
=== Teams ===
See: List of teams on the 2016–17 World Curling Tour

Grand Slam events in bold.

=== Men's events ===
Week	Event	Winning skip	Runner-up skip	Purse (CAD (Note: Prize winnings converted from local currency for events held outside Canada (as of May 2, 2016)))	Winner's share (CAD)	SFM
1	Hokkaido Bank Curling Classic; Sapporo, Japan, Aug. 4–7	(Alberta) Karsten Sturmay	(China) Wang Fengchun	$10,947	$6,439	1.9796
2	Baden Masters; Baden, Switzerland, Aug. 26–28	(Switzerland) Peter de Cruz	(Norway) Thomas Ulsrud	$41,248	$14,636	7.2900
3	Oakville OCT Fall Classic; Oakville, Ontario, Sep. 2–4	(Scotland) Kyle Smith	(United States) Heath McCormick	$13,000	$3,000	5.5908
4	Harbin International Men's Championship; Harbin, China, Sep. 7–12	(Sweden) Gustav Eskilsson	(China) Liu Rui	$23,219	$10,319	2.7188
4	Stu Sells Oakville Tankard; Oakville, Ontario, Sep. 8–11	(Sweden) Niklas Edin	(British Columbia) John Morris	$27,000	$8,000	9.1932
4	Stu Sells Oakville Tankard Tier 2 Oakville, Ontario, Sep. 8–11	(Netherlands) Jaap van Dorp	(Ontario) Tanner Horgan	$16,000	$4,000	4.8525
5	Cloverdale Cash Spiel; Surrey, British Columbia, Sep. 16–18	(China) Liu Rui	(British Columbia) Adam Cseke	$9,300	$2,500	2.1279
5	AMJ Campbell Shorty Jenkins Classic; Cornwall, Ontario, Sep. 15–18	(Alberta) Kevin Koe	(Newfoundland and Labrador) Mark Nichols	$59,000	$15,000	11.0781
6	Mother Club Fall Curling Classic; Winnipeg, Manitoba, Sep. 22–25	(Manitoba) David Bohn	(South Korea) Kim Ho-gun	$12,000	$3,000	3.5625
6	College Clean Restoration Curling Classic; Saskatoon, Saskatchewan, Sep. 23–26	(Ontario) Brad Jacobs	(Norway) Thomas Ulsrud	$50,000	$12,000	9.3845
6	KW Fall Classic; Waterloo, Ontario, Sep. 22–25	(Ontario) Richard Krell	(Ontario) Ryan LeDrew	$9,900	$2,500	2.7860
6	Lakeshore Curling Club Cashspiel; Lower Sackville, Nova Scotia, Sep. 21–26	(Nova Scotia) Stuart Thompson	(Nova Scotia) Chad Stevens	$5,250	$1,400	2.3374
7	Swiss Cup Basel; Basel, Switzerland, Sept. 29–Oct. 2	(Sweden) Niklas Edin	(Scotland) David Murdoch	$53,906	$18,867	7.3316
7	Avonair Cash Spiel; Edmonton, Alberta, Sept. 30–Oct. 2	(Alberta) Glen Hansen	(Alberta) Charley Thomas	$12,000	$3,300	3.4500
7	Prestige Hotels & Resorts Curling Classic; Vernon, British Columbia, Sept. 30–Oct. 3	(British Columbia) Tyler Tardi	(Japan) Yusuke Morozumi	$17,000	$5,000	0.0000
7	KKP Classic; Winnipeg, Manitoba, Sept. 30–Oct. 2	(South Korea) Kim Chang-min	(Manitoba) Dennis Bohn	$10,000	$2,500	2.8350
8	Stu Sells Toronto Tankard; Toronto, Ontario, Oct. 6–10	(Newfoundland and Labrador) Mark Nichols	(Ontario) John Epping	$48,000	$15,000	7.8594
8	St. Paul Cash Spiel; St. Paul, Minnesota, Oct. 7–8	(United States) Heath McCormick	(United States) Kroy Nernberger	$16,342	$5,272	3.3578
8	Bud Light Men's Cashspiel; Halifax, Nova Scotia, Oct. 7–10	(Nova Scotia) Chad Stevens	(Nova Scotia) Stuart Thompson	$7,350	$2,000	2.3984
8	Man Curl Tour Classic; Winnipeg, Manitoba, Oct. 7–10	(Manitoba) Braden Calvert	(Manitoba) Richard Muntain	$12,000	$3,000	2.8929
8	Direct Horizontal Drilling Fall Classic; Edmonton, Alberta, Oct. 7–10	(Saskatchewan) Steve Laycock	(Manitoba) Reid Carruthers	$50,000	$12,000	8.5781
8	Minebea Cup; Miyota, Japan, Oct. 8–10	(Japan) Ryo Ogihara	(Japan) Hayato Matsumura	$4,651	$1,938	1.1994
9	Canad Inns Prairie Classic; Portage la Prairie, Manitoba, Oct. 14–17	(Manitoba) Reid Carruthers	(Alberta) Charley Thomas	$60,000	$18,000	9.5770
9	Hub International Crown of Curling; Kamloops, British Columbia, Oct. 14–17	(British Columbia) Dean Joanisse	(South Korea) Kim Soo-hyuk	$26,000	$7,000	3.1647
9	Stroud Sleeman Cash Spiel; Stroud, Ontario, Oct. 13–16	(Ontario) Chad Allen	(Ontario) Colin Dow	$12,380	$4,000	2.8924
9	McKee Homes Fall Curling Classic; Airdrie, Alberta, Oct. 14–16	(Alberta) Glen Hansen	(Alberta) Aaron Sluchinski	$12,000	$4,000	2.1111
9	Thompson Curling Challenge; Urdorf, Switzerland, Oct. 14–16	(Switzerland) Kevin Wunderlin	(Switzerland) Yves Hess	$11,675	$4,246	1.7145
10	Medicine Hat Charity Classic; Medicine Hat, Alberta, Oct. 21–24	(Saskatchewan) Jason Jacobson	(Alberta) Ted Appelman	$35,000	$10,000	4.2737
10	Challenge de Curling de Gatineau; Buckingham, Quebec, Oct. 19–23	(Ontario) John Epping	(Manitoba) Matt Dunstone	$45,000	$12,000	6.9850
10	Curling Masters Champery; Champery, Switzerland, Oct. 20–23	(Sweden) Niklas Edin	(Switzerland) Marc Pfister	$53,678	$17,445	5.4824
11	**Masters of Curling**; Okotoks, Alberta, Oct. 25–30	(Sweden) Niklas Edin	(Ontario) Brad Jacobs	$125,000	$30,000	11.8711
11	Huron ReproGraphics Oil Heritage Classic; Point Edward, Ontario, Oct. 27–30	(United States) Heath McCormick	(Ontario) Jake Higgs	$17,100	$4,700	4.6809
11	Grande Prairie Cash Spiel; Grande Prairie, Alberta, Oct. 28–30	(Alberta) Kurt Balderston	(Alberta) Tyler Pfeiffer	$9,700	$2,400	1.4939
12	Edinburgh International; Edinburgh, Scotland, Nov. 4–6	(Czech Republic) Karel Kubeska	(Scotland) Bruce Mouat	$18,961	$9,229	2.8601
12	CookstownCash presented by Comco Canada Inc; Cookstown, Ontario, Nov. 3–6	(Ontario) John Epping	(Switzerland) Peter de Cruz	$22,500	$7,000	6.0563
12	Ken Kurbis Galaxy Bonspiel; Winnipeg, Manitoba, Nov. 4–7	(Manitoba) Trevor Loreth	(Manitoba) Braden Calvert	$10,000	$3,400	3.5199
12	Fort St. John Cash Spiel; Fort St. John, British Columbia, Nov. 4–6	(Alberta) Scott Webb	(British Columbia) Jeff Ginter	$8,000	$2,100	1.2597
13	**GSOC Tour Challenge Tier 1** Cranbrook, British Columbia, Nov. 8–13	(Sweden) Niklas Edin	(Scotland) Kyle Smith	$100,000	$20,000	11.9989
13	GSOC Tour Challenge Tier 2 Cranbrook, British Columbia, Nov. 8–13	(Ontario) Greg Balsdon	(Ontario) Glenn Howard	$50,000	$10,000	6.7561
13	Original 16 WCT Bonspiel; Calgary, Alberta, Nov. 11–13	(Saskatchewan) Carl deConinck Smith	(Norway) Steffen Walstad	$22,000	$6,000	3.6141
14	DeKalb Superspiel; Morris, Manitoba, Nov. 18–21	(Manitoba) Mike McEwen	(Manitoba) William Lyburn	$45,000	$11,000	6.6085
14	Red Deer Curling Classic; Red Deer, Alberta, Nov. 18–21	(Alberta) Kevin Koe	(Alberta) Ted Appelman	$39,000	$10,000	6.4764
14	Dave Jones Mayflower Cashspiel; Halifax, Nova Scotia, Nov. 17–20	(Nova Scotia) Jamie Murphy	(Nova Scotia) Stuart Thompson	$26,000	$6,000	3.6006
15	Driving Force Abbotsford Cashspiel; Abbotsford, British Columbia, Nov. 25–27	(British Columbia) John Morris	(British Columbia) Ken McArdle	$18,000	$6,000	2.5057
15	Challenge Casino de Charlevoix; Clermont, Quebec, Nov. 24–27	(Nova Scotia) Stuart Thompson	(Nova Scotia) Chad Stevens	$27,000	$8,000	4.5088
15	The Sunova Spiel at East St. Paul; Winnipeg, Manitoba, Nov. 24–28	(Manitoba) Matt Dunstone	(Manitoba) David Bohn	$10,000	$2,600	3.2169
15	Estevan Curling Classic; Estevan, Saskatchewan, Nov. 25–28	(Saskatchewan) Randy Bryden	(Saskatchewan) Bruce Korte	$28,000	$10,000	3.6375
15	Coors Light Cash Spiel; Duluth, Minnesota, Nov. 25–28	(United States) Heath McCormick	(United States) John Shuster	$14,327	$4,056	3.3405
15	Dawson Creek Cash Spiel; Dawson Creek, British Columbia, Nov. 25–27	(Alberta) Thomas Scoffin	(Alberta) Warren Cross	$12,000	$2,500	1.8038
15	Spitfire Arms Cash Spiel; Windsor, Nova Scotia, Nov. 25–27	(Nova Scotia) Doug MacKenzie	(Nova Scotia) Scott Saunders	$4,500	$1,200	1.3703
15	Bally Haly Cashspiel; St. John's, Newfoundland and Labrador, Nov. 25–27	(Newfoundland and Labrador) Colin Thomas	(Newfoundland and Labrador) Mark Noseworthy	$3,350	$1,680	0.0000
16	WFG Jim Sullivan Curling Classic; Saint John, New Brunswick, Dec. 2–4	(Quebec) Jean-Michel Ménard	(New Brunswick) James Grattan	$15,300	$5,000	2.5516
16	Thistle Integrity Stakes; Winnipeg, Manitoba, Dec. 2–5	(Manitoba) Trevor Loreth	(Manitoba) Braden Calvert	$5,000	$1,300	2.4978
16	Black Diamond / High River Cash; Black Diamond & High River, Alberta, Dec. 2–4	(Alberta) Kevin Yablonski	(Alberta) Rob Johnson	$11,000	$2,000	1.7803
16	Home Hardware Canada Cup of Curling; Brandon, Manitoba, Nov. 30–Dec. 4	(Manitoba) Reid Carruthers	(Newfoundland and Labrador) Mark Nichols	$70,000	$22,000	12.0180
17	**Boost National**; Sault Ste. Marie, Ontario, Dec. 6–11	(Ontario) Brad Jacobs	(Manitoba) Reid Carruthers	$125,000	$30,000	11.6366
17	MCT Championships; Dauphin, Manitoba, Dec. 9–11	(Manitoba) David Bohn	(Manitoba) Braden Calvert	$8,500	$2,000	3.0658
18	Curl Mesabi Classic; Eveleth, Minnesota, Dec. 16–18	(United States) Heath McCormick	(United States) John Shuster	$34,662	$9,332	4.2759
18	Karuizawa International; Karuizawa, Japan, Dec. 15–18	(Scotland) Tom Brewster	(Scotland) David Murdoch	$28,277	$11,311	4.1850
18	Dumfries Challenger Series; Dumfries, Scotland, Dec. 15–18	(Scotland) Kyle Smith	(Scotland) Cameron Bryce	$12,492	$4,997	2.3092
18	Qinghai China Men's International; Xining, China, Dec. 9–17	(Norway) Thomas Ulsrud	(Manitoba) William Lyburn	$23,996	$13,331	3.0938
20	US Open of Curling; Blaine, Minnesota, Dec. 30–Jan. 2	(Manitoba) Matt Dunstone	(Manitoba) William Lyburn	$22,853	$6,722	3.9151
21	Mercure Perth Masters; Perth, Scotland, Jan. 5–8	(Scotland) Tom Brewster	(Norway) Steffen Walstad	$29,745	$10,565	5.6827
21	**Canadian Open**; North Battleford, Saskatchewan, Jan. 3–8	(Newfoundland and Labrador) Brad Gushue	(Sweden) Niklas Edin	$100,000	$30,000	11.6944
21	Goldline Saskatchewan Players Championship; Humboldt, Saskatchewan, Jan. 6–8	(Saskatchewan) Kody Hartung	(Saskatchewan) Brad Heidt	$11,000	$3,000	2.6313
21	King Cash Spiel; Maple Ridge, British Columbia, Jan. 6–8	(British Columbia) Dean Joanisse	(United States) Lyle Sieg	$3,000	$1,500	0.0000
22	Brandon Men's Bonspiel; Brandon, Manitoba, Jan. 13-15	(Manitoba) William Lyburn	(Manitoba) Steve Irwin	$6,800	$3,000	1.9992
22	Peace Tour Championship; Sexsmith, Alberta, Jan. 13–15	(Alberta) Kurt Balderston	(Alberta) Warren Cross	$8,450	$3,000	0.9851
23	German Masters; Hamburg, Germany, Jan. 19–22	(Norway) Steffen Walstad	(Scotland) Kyle Smith	$24,955	$8,556	6.3459
23	Ed Werenich Golden Wrench Classic; Tempe, Arizona, Jan. 19–22	(Manitoba) Mike McEwen	(Saskatchewan) Adam Casey	$21,317	$7,994	5.9787
24	Red Square Classic; Moscow, Russia, Jan. 27-29	(Switzerland) Marc Pfister	(Russia) Alexander Orlov			0.0000
31	**Princess Auto Elite 10**; Port Hawkesbury, Nova Scotia, Mar. 16–19	(British Columbia) John Morris	(Ontario) Brad Jacobs	$100,000	$26,000	0.0000
31	Aberdeen International Curling Championship; Aberdeen, Scotland, Mar. 15-19	(Scotland) Grant Hardie	(China) Liu Rui	$21,946	$9,117	6.2143
35	**Westjet Players' Championship**; Toronto, Ontario, Apr. 11–16	(Sweden) Niklas Edin	(Manitoba) Mike McEwen	$100,000	$30,000	11.1169
36	Euronics European Masters; St. Gallen, Switzerland, Apr. 19-22	(Scotland) Kyle Smith	(Sweden) Niklas Edin	$29,000	$12,000	4.5938
37	**Humpty's Champions Cup**; Calgary, Alberta, Apr. 25–30	(Ontario) Brad Jacobs	(Alberta) Kevin Koe	$100,000	$40,000	11.1251

=== Women's events ===
Week	Event	Winning skip	Runner-up skip	Purse (CAD)	Winner's share (CAD)	SFM
1	Hokkaido Bank Curling Classic; Sapporo, Japan, Aug. 4–7	(Alberta) Chelsea Carey	(South Korea) Gim Un-chi	$10,947	$6,439	3.5117
3	Oakville OCT Fall Classic; Oakville, Ontario, Sep. 2–4	(Sweden) Anna Hasselborg	(Sweden) Isabella Wranå	$10,000	$2,200	5.0338
4	Stu Sells Oakville Tankard; Oakville, Ontario, Sep. 8–11	(Switzerland) Silvana Tirinzoni	(Ontario) Allison Flaxey	$24,000	$7,000	7.5001
4	HDF Insurance Shoot-Out; Edmonton, Alberta, Sept. 8–11	(Alberta) Casey Scheidegger	(Scotland) Eve Muirhead	$32,000	$8,000	7.1925
5	Cloverdale Cash Spiel; Surrey, British Columbia, Sep. 16–18	(British Columbia) Diane Gushulak	(British Columbia) Lindsay Hudyma	$5,950	$1,500	2.3645
5	Colonial Square Ladies Classic; Saskatoon, Saskatchewan, Sept. 16–19	(China) Wang Bingyu	(Scotland) Eve Muirhead	$40,000	$11,000	9.0781
5	AMJ Campbell Shorty Jenkins Classic; Cornwall, Ontario, Sept. 15–18	(Ontario) Rachel Homan	(Ontario) Allison Flaxey	$29,500	$10,000	6.4872
6	Mother Club Fall Curling Classic; Winnipeg, Manitoba, Sep. 22–25	(Manitoba) Michelle Englot	(Manitoba) Joelle Brown	$8,000	$2,500	3.9437
6	KW Fall Classic; Waterloo, Ontario, Sept. 22–25	(Ontario) Sherry Middaugh	(Ontario) Julie Tippin	$10,000	$2,500	4.7795
6	Lakeshore Curling Club Cashspiel; Lower Sackville, Nova Scotia, Sept. 21–26	(Nova Scotia) Nancy McConnery	(Nova Scotia) Jill Brothers	$5,350	$1,450	2.6367
7	Stockholm Ladies Curling Cup; Stockholm, Sweden, Sept. 29–Oct. 2	(Sweden) Anna Hasselborg	(Scotland) Hannah Fleming	$41,343	$15,312	8.5894
7	Avonair Cash Spiel; Edmonton, Alberta, Sept. 30–Oct. 2	(Alberta) Nadine Chyz	(Alberta) Jodi Marthaller	$9,700	$2,600	3.0298
7	Prestige Hotels & Resorts Curling Classic; Vernon, British Columbia, Sept. 29–Oct. 2	(British Columbia) Marla Mallett	(Alberta) Cheryl Bernard	$41,500	$8,900	7.5507
8	Women's Masters Basel; Basel, Switzerland, Oct. 6–9	(Scotland) Eve Muirhead	(Sweden) Margaretha Sigfridsson	$40,218	$13,406	8.0966
8	St. Paul Cash Spiel; St. Paul, Minnesota, Oct. 7–9	(United States) Cory Christensen	(United States) Nina Roth	$8,501	$3,295	2.9958
8	Curlers Corner Autumn Gold Curling Classic; Calgary, Alberta, Oct. 7–10	(Alberta) Casey Scheidegger	(Manitoba) Jennifer Jones	$50,000	$14,000	8.9388
8	New Scotland Clothing Ladies Cashspiel; Halifax, Nova Scotia, Oct. 7–10	(Nova Scotia) Kristen MacDiarmid	(Nova Scotia) Theresa Breen	$7,350	$2,000	2.8626
9	Hub International Crown of Curling; Kamloops, British Columbia, Oct. 14–17	(South Korea) Kim Min-ji	(Japan) Satsuki Fujisawa	$26,000	$7,000	4.5395
9	Stroud Sleeman Cash Spiel; Stroud, Ontario, Oct. 13–16	(Ontario) Julie Tippin	(Ontario) Megan Balsdon	$7,425	$2,400	3.2136
9	Atkins Curling Supplies Classic; Winnipeg, Manitoba, Oct. 14–17	(Manitoba) Beth Peterson	(Manitoba) Darcy Robertson	$17,900	$4,000	4.0462
10	Medicine Hat Charity Classic; Medicine Hat, Alberta, Oct. 21–24	(Alberta) Casey Scheidegger	(Alberta) Nadine Chyz	$11,600	$3,000	3.2440
10	Canad Inns Women's Classic; Portage la Prairie, Manitoba, Oct. 21–24	(Ontario) Rachel Homan	(Japan) Chiaki Matsumura	$60,000	$15,500	10.6735
10	Lady Monctonian Invitational Spiel; Moncton, New Brunswick, Oct. 21–23	(Nova Scotia) Jill Brothers	(Prince Edward Island) Robyn MacPhee	$8,800	$1,800	3.1108
11	**Masters of Curling**; Okotoks, Alberta, Oct. 25–30	(Ontario) Allison Flaxey	(Ontario) Rachel Homan	$125,000	$30,000	12.1055
11	Riga International Curling Challenge; Riga, Latvia, Oct. 28–30	(Germany) Daniela Jentsch	(Switzerland) Isabelle Maillard	$4,419	$2,062	1.9674
12	Royal LePage OVCA Women's Fall Classic; Kemptville, Ontario, Nov. 3–6	(Prince Edward Island) Robyn MacPhee	(Japan) Ayumi Ogasawara	$17,500	$5,500	4.7273
12	CookstownCash presented by Comco Canada Inc; Cookstown, Ontario, Nov. 3–6	(Ontario) Heather Heggestad	(Ontario) Mallory Kean	$5,400	$2,260	1.9633
13	**GSOC Tour Challenge Tier 1** Cranbrook, British Columbia, Nov. 8–13	(Alberta) Valerie Sweeting	(Manitoba) Michelle Englot	$100,000	$20,000	11.4448
13	GSOC Tour Challenge Tier 2 Cranbrook, British Columbia, Nov. 8–13	(Ontario) Jacqueline Harrison	(Ontario) Krista McCarville	$50,000	$10,000	6.8413
13	International ZO Women's Tournament; Wetzikon, Switzerland, Nov. 11–13	(Switzerland) Melanie Barbezat	(Germany) Andrea Schöpp	$19,004	$8,144	4.1197
13	Crestwood Ladies Fall Classic; Edmonton, Alberta, Nov. 11–13	(Alberta) Nadine Chyz	(Alberta) Kalynn Virtue	$11,000	$3,000	2.9272
14	DeKalb Superspiel; Morris, Manitoba, Nov. 18–21	(Manitoba) Jennifer Jones	(Manitoba) Michelle Englot	$37,000	$11,000	7.0919
14	Red Deer Curling Classic; Red Deer, Alberta, Nov. 18–21	(Alberta) Nadine Chyz	(Scotland) Hannah Fleming	$29,000	$8,500	6.0501
14	Dave Jones Mayflower Cashspiel; Halifax, Nova Scotia, Nov. 17–20	(Nova Scotia) Jill Brothers	(Nova Scotia) Theresa Breen	$11,000	$3,400	3.2675
15	Driving Force Abbotsford Cashspiel; Abbotsford, British Columbia, Nov. 25–27	(China) Wang Bingyu	(British Columbia) Karla Thompson	$18,000	$6,000	3.0698
15	Boundary Ford Curling Classic; Lloydminster, Saskatchewan, Nov. 25–28	(Saskatchewan) Sherry Anderson	(Saskatchewan) Chantelle Eberle	$23,200	$6,500	4.5873
15	The Sunova Spiel at East St. Paul; Winnipeg, Manitoba, Nov. 24–28	(Ontario) Tracy Fleury	(Manitoba) Michelle Englot	$10,000	$2,600	4.3965
15	Molson Cash Spiel; Duluth, Minnesota, Nov. 24–26	(United States) Nina Roth	(United States) Jamie Sinclair	$8,381	$2,974	3.0626
15	Spitfire Arms Cash Spiel; Windsor, Nova Scotia, Nov. 25–27	(Nova Scotia) Colleen Jones	(Nova Scotia) Mary-Anne Arsenault	$6,200	$2,000	3.1589
15	Bally Haly Cashspiel; St. John's, Newfoundland and Labrador, Nov. 25–27	(Newfoundland and Labrador) Stacie Curtis	(Newfoundland and Labrador) Heather Strong	$2,600	$1,200	0.0000
16	WFG Jim Sullivan Curling Classic; Saint John, New Brunswick, Dec. 2–4	(New Brunswick) Sylvie Robichaud	(Nova Scotia) Christie Gamble	$5,000	$1,700	1.5600
16	Home Hardware Canada Cup of Curling; Brandon, Manitoba, Nov. 30–Dec. 4	(Manitoba) Jennifer Jones	(Ontario) Rachel Homan	$70,000	$24,000	11.3942
17	**Boost National**; Sault Ste. Marie, Ontario, Dec. 6–11	(Manitoba) Kerri Einarson	(Switzerland) Silvana Tirinzoni	$100,000	$30,000	12.0203
17	MCT Championships; Dauphin, Manitoba, Dec. 9–11	(Manitoba) Darcy Robertson	(Manitoba) Shannon Birchard	$4,250	$1,750	2.0358
18	Curl Mesabi Classic; Eveleth, Minnesota, Dec. 16–18	(Alberta) Nadine Chyz	(United States) Cassandra Potter	$14,663	$,4,666	2.9983
18	Karuizawa International; Karuizawa, Japan, Dec. 15–18	(South Korea) Gim Un-chi	(Sweden) Margaretha Sigfridsson	$28,277	$11,311	5.9675
18	Dumfries Challenger Series; Dumfries, Scotland, Dec. 15–18	(Switzerland) Alisha Mathis	(Scotland) Sophie Jackson	$8,662	$3,332	0.0000
18	Qinghai China Women's International; Xining, China, Dec. 9–17	(British Columbia) Corryn Brown	(Scotland) Hannah Fleming	$23,996	$18,000	2.4375
20	US Open of Curling; Blaine, Minnesota, Dec. 30–Jan. 2	(Ontario) Sherry Middaugh	(United States) Nina Roth	$22,853	$6,722	6.1040
21	King Cash Spiel; Maple Ridge, British Columbia, Jan. 6–8	(British Columbia) Karla Thompson	(Alberta) Shannon Kleibrink	$8,000	$3,000	3.0742
21	**Canadian Open**; North Battleford, Saskatchewan, Jan. 3–8	(Alberta) Casey Scheidegger	(Switzerland) Silvana Tirinzoni	$100,000	$30,000	11.5706
22	International Bernese Ladies Cup; Bern, Switzerland, Jan. 12–15	(Switzerland) Alina Pätz	(Switzerland) Silvana Tirinzoni	$26,655	$7,802	6.1693
23	Glynhill Ladies International; Glasgow, Scotland, Jan. 19–22	(Scotland) Eve Muirhead	(Switzerland) Alina Pätz	$16,478	$6,591	5.5571
33	City of Perth Ladies International; Perth, Scotland, Mar. 31-Apr 2	(Ontario) Allison Flaxey	(Switzerland) Silvana Tirinzoni	$26,489	$7,357	6.7546
35	**Westjet Players' Championship**; Toronto, Ontario, Apr. 11–16	(Manitoba) Jennifer Jones	(Alberta) Valerie Sweeting	$100,000	$30,000	10.6597
36	Euronics European Masters; St. Gallen, Switzerland, Apr. 19-22	(Czech Republic) Anna Kubeskova	(Switzerland) Alina Pätz	$20,000	$9,000	2.1750
37	**Champions Cup**; Calgary, Alberta, Apr. 25–30	(Ontario) Rachel Homan	(Sweden) Anna Hasselborg	$100,000	$40,000	10.5284

=== Mixed doubles events ===
Week	Event	Winning pair	Runner-up pair	Purse (CAD)	Winner's share (CAD)	SFM
6	CCT Tallinn Mixed Doubles International; Tallinn, Estonia, Sept. 22–25	(Norway) Skaslien / Nedregotten	(Finland) Kauste / Rantamaki	$591		
7	Canad Inns Mixed Doubles Championship; Portage la Prairie, Manitoba, Sept. 30–Oct. 2	(Ontario) Homan / (Alberta) Morris	(China) Wang / Ba			
9	Service Experts Mixed Doubles Classic; Edmonton, Alberta, Oct. 14–16	(Russia) Portunova / Glukhov	(China) Xu / Kuo			
10	CCT Austrian Mixed Doubles Cup; Kitzbühel, Austria, Oct. 20–23	(Hungary) Szekeres / Nagy	(Scotland) Aitken / Mouat			
11	CCT Mixed Doubles Cup Geising; Geising, Germany, Oct. 28–30	(Russia) Bryzgalova / Krushelnitskiy	(Czech Republic) Hájková / Paul			
12	Pacific Northwest Mixed Doubles Invitational; Seattle, Washington, Nov. 3–6	(Saskatchewan) Martin / Schneider	(United States) Peterson / Polo	$25,732		
14	Wall Grain Mixed Doubles Classic; Kimberley, British Columbia, Nov. 14–16	(Ontario) Homan / (Alberta) Morris	(Ontario) Miskew / (British Columbia) Griffith			
14	Bern Mixed Doubles CCT; Bern, Switzerland, Nov. 16–20	(Scotland) Aitken / Mouat	(Switzerland) T. Michel / S. Michel			
15	Listowel Mixed Doubles Spiel; Listowel, Ontario, Nov. 25–27	(Ontario) Westlund Stewart / Stewart	(Ontario) Wasylkiw / Ewart	$6,400		
15	Brazil National Mixed Doubles Championship; Vancouver, British Columbia, Nov. 18–26	(Brazil) Shibuya / Cerquinho	(Brazil) Oliveira / Nunes			
18	Mixed Doubles Curling Challenge; Urdorf, Switzerland, Dec. 16–18	(China) Wang / Ba	(Switzerland) Jäggi / Freiberger			
22	CCT Dutch Masters Mixed Doubles; Zoetermeer, Netherlands, Jan. 13–15	(Hungary) Kalocsai / (Netherlands) van Dorp	(England) A. Fowler / B. Fowler	$2,093		
23	Gefle Mixed Doubles Cup; Gävle, Sweden, Jan. 19–22	(Switzerland) Jäggi / Freiberger	(Switzerland) M. Gribi / R. Gribi			
24	Stu Sells Mixed Doubles Championship; Toronto, Ontario, Jan. 27–28	(Ontario) K. Tuck / W. Tuck	(Ontario) Westlund Stewart / Stewart			
25	International Mixed Doubles Aarau Trophy; Aarau, Switzerland, Feb. 3–5	(Switzerland) Perret / Rios	(Russia) Moskaleva / Gulkhov			
27	CCT Slovakia Mixed Doubles Curling Cup; Bratislava, Slovakia, Feb. 16–19	(Russia) Moskaleva / Glukhov	(Russia) Bryzgalova / Krushelnitsky			
29	Toronto Cricket Mixed Doubles Cashspiel; Toronto, Ontario, Mar. 3–5	(South Korea) Kim / Lee	(Manitoba) Menard / Baker	TBD		
32	International Mixed Doubles Dumfries; Dumfries, Scotland, Mar. 24–26	(Sweden) C. Noreen / P. Noreen	(Spain) Garcia / Garcia Vez	TBD		
33	Latvian Mixed Doubles Curling Cup; Riga, Latvia, Mar. 30–Apr. 2	(Russia) Bryzgalova / Krushelnitsky	(Switzerland) Perret / Rios	TBD		

== WCT Order of Merit rankings ==
Men

After Week 35
#	Skip	Points
1	(Sweden) Niklas Edin	538.755
2	(Newfoundland and Labrador) Brad Gushue	520.533
3	(Manitoba) Reid Carruthers	404.461
4	(Ontario) Brad Jacobs	393.266
5	(Manitoba) Mike McEwen	340.698
6	(Ontario) John Epping	331.506
7	(Alberta) Kevin Koe	330.396
8	(Scotland) Kyle Smith	309.127
9	(Saskatchewan) Steve Laycock	299.038
10	(Switzerland) Peter de Cruz	276.074

Women

After Week 35
#	Skip	Points
1	(Ontario) Rachel Homan	455.229
2	(Manitoba) Jennifer Jones	397.078
3	(Switzerland) Silvana Tirinzoni	386.589
4	(Sweden) Anna Hasselborg	372.295
5	(Ontario) Allison Flaxey	341.058
6	(Alberta) Valerie Sweeting	325.544
7	(Alberta) Casey Scheidegger	303.570
8	(Scotland) Eve Muirhead	303.252
9	(Manitoba) Michelle Englot	264.412
10	(Ontario) Tracy Fleury	224.898

== WCT Money List ==
Men

Final
#	Skip	$ (CAD)
1	(Sweden) Niklas Edin	$191,469
2	(Ontario) Brad Jacobs	$164,000
3	(Newfoundland and Labrador) Brad Gushue	$140,395
4	(Manitoba) Reid Carruthers	$120,200
5	(Alberta) Kevin Koe	$107,000
6	(British Columbia) John Morris	$94,762
7	(Manitoba) Mike McEwen	$89,066
8	(Ontario) John Epping	$86,000
9	(Scotland) Kyle Smith	$73,801
10	(Saskatchewan) Steve Laycock	$69,000

Women

Final
#	Skip	$ (CAD)
1	(Ontario) Rachel Homan	$132,500
2	(Manitoba) Jennifer Jones	$121,897
3	(Sweden) Anna Hasselborg	$113,262
4	(Switzerland) Silvana Tirinzoni	$97,558
5	(Alberta) Valerie Sweeting	$90,250
6	(Ontario) Allison Flaxey	$84,995
7	(Alberta) Casey Scheidegger	$74,500
8	(Scotland) Eve Muirhead	$56,697
9	(Manitoba) Kerri Einarson	$51,500
10	(Ontario) Tracy Fleury	$47,203

== Notes ==
Preceded by 2015–16	2016–17 curling season August 2016 – April 2017	Succeeded by 2017–18
