= Kinistin Saulteaux Nation =

Saulteaux band government in Saskatchewan, Canada

Coordinates: 52°35′56″N 104°13′37″W

- Band No. 377
- People: Saulteaux
- Treaty: Treaty 4
- Headquarters: Tisdale
- Province: Saskatchewan

Land
- Main reserve: Kinistin 91
- Reserve: Kinistin 91A
- Land area: 41.48 km^{2} (16.02 sq mi)

Population (2019)
- On reserve: 339
- Off reserve: 750
- Total population: 1089

Government
- Chief: Felix Thomas

Tribal Council
- Saskatoon Tribal Council

Website
- kinistin.sk.ca

The Kinistin Saulteaux Nation (Ojibwe: Gidishkoniganinaan) is a Saulteaux band government in Saskatchewan. Their reserve is 39 kilometres (24 mi) southeast of Melfort. The Kinistin Saulteaux Nation is a signatory of Treaty No. 4, which was signed by Chief Yellow-quill on August 24, 1876.

Total registered population in February, 2009, was 913, of which the on-reserve population was 328 members. The First Nation is a member of the Saskatoon Tribal Council and have their urban offices in Saskatoon as well as their Tribal Council offices.

== History ==
The First Nation was originally part of the Yellow-quill Saulteaux Band, a Treaty Band named after a Treaty 4 signatory Chief Ošāwaškokwanēpi, whose name means "Green/Blue-quill." However, due to "š" merging with "s" in Nakawēmowin (Saulteaux language), this led to a mistranslation of his name as "Yellow-quill"—"yellow" being osāw-, while "green/blue" being ošāwaško- (or osāwasko- in Saulteaux). Kinistin is named after Chief Kiništin ("Cree"), one of the headmen for Chief Ošāwaškokwanēpi. Chief Kiništin came to Saskatchewan from Western Ontario along with his two brothers, Miskokwanep ("Red [Crow-]Feather") and Mehcihcākanihs ("Coyote"). In 1901, lands were set aside for the Kinistin Band. Soon after the death of Chief Ošāwaškokwanēpi, the Yellow-quill Saulteaux Band divided into three groups, with the group originally headed by Chief Kiništin becoming the Kinistin Saulteaux Nation.

== Reserves ==
The First Nation have reserved for themselves three reserves:

- 3,562.90 hectares (8,804.1 acres) Kinistin Reserve 91, which serves as their main Reserve.
- 457.30 hectares (1,130.0 acres) Kinistin Reserve 91A
- 37.1 hectares (92 acres) Treaty Four Reserve Grounds (Indian Reserve 77), which is shared with 32 other First Nations.

== Governance ==
Kinistin have an elected tribal council consisting of a chief and five councilors. The current council for the two-year-long electoral term ending in April 2019, consists of Chief Felix Thomas and Councillors Wayne J. Thomas, Joseph Smokeyday, Cecil McNab and Craig Thomas.
