= Stenen, Saskatchewan =

Village in Saskatchewan, Canada

Stenen
- Village
- Location of Stenen in Saskatchewan Stenen (Canada)
- Coordinates: 51.917°N 102.402°W
- Country: Canada
- Province: Saskatchewan
- Census division: 9
- Rural Municipality: Clayton No. 333
- Post office Founded: 1906-08-01

Government
  - Mayor: Jason Anaka
  - Administrator: Olivia Bartch
  - Governing body: Stenen Village

Area
  - Total: 0.58 km^{2} (0.22 sq mi)

Population (2006)
  - Total: 91
  - Density: 189/km^{2} (490/sq mi)
- Time zone: CST
- Postal code: S0A 3X0
- Area code: 306
- Highways: Highway 49; SaskatchewanHighway 662
- Website: Official website

Stenen (2016 population: 90) is a village in the Canadian province of Saskatchewan within the Rural Municipality of Clayton No. 333 and Census Division No. 9.

== History ==
Stenen incorporated as a village on August 14, 1912.

== Demographics ==
Population history (1981–2016)
| Year | Pop. | ±% |
|---|---|---|
| 1981 | 143 | — |
| 1986 | 164 | +14.7% |
| 1991 | 120 | −26.8% |
| 1996 | 100 | −16.7% |
| 2001 | 110 | +10.0% |
| 2006 | 91 | −17.3% |
| 2011 | 79 | −13.2% |
| 2016 | 90 | +13.9% |
Source: Statistics Canada via Saskatchewan Bureau of Statistics

In the 2021 Census of Population conducted by Statistics Canada, Stenen had a population of 89 living in 44 of its 51 total private dwellings, a change of −1.1% from its 2016 population of 90. With a land area of 0.71 km^{2} (0.27 sq mi), it had a population density of 125.4/km^{2} (324.7/sq mi) in 2021.

In the 2016 Census of Population, the Village of Stenen recorded a population of 90 living in 42 of its 43 total private dwellings, a 12.2% change from its 2011 population of 79. With a land area of 0.7 km^{2} (0.27 sq mi), it had a population density of 128.6/km^{2} (333.0/sq mi) in 2016.

== Notable people ==
- Wilson Parasiuk

== See also ==
- List of communities in Saskatchewan
- List of villages in Saskatchewan
