= Pelly, Saskatchewan =

Village in Saskatchewan, Canada

Village of Pelly
- Village
- Motto: Pearl of the Parkland
- Pelly Village of Pelly (Canada)
- Coordinates: 51°51′23″N 101°55′38″W
- Country: Canada
- Province: Saskatchewan
- Census division: 9
- Rural municipality: St. Philips No. 301
- Incorporated (village): 1911

Government
  - Mayor: Trevor Auchstaetter
  - Administrator: Leanne Kwasney
  - Governing body: Pelly Village Council

Area
  - Total: 0.96 km^{2} (0.37 sq mi)

Population (2006)
  - Total: 287
  - Density: 315.5/km^{2} (817/sq mi)
- Time zone: CST
- Postal code: S0A 2Z0
- Area code: 306
- Highways: Highway 49; Highway 8
- Website: Pelly Saskatchewan homepage

Pelly (2016 population: 285) is a village in the Canadian province of Saskatchewan within the Rural Municipality of St. Philips No. 301 and Census Division No. 9.

The village is the closest inhabited settlement to the historical sites of Fort Livingstone, a former capital of the North-West Territories and a former North-West Mounted Police headquarters, and Fort Pelly, the Swan River district headquarters for the Hudson's Bay Company, from which the village gets its name.

== History ==
Pelly incorporated as a village on May 4, 1911.

== Climate ==
Climate data for Pelly
Month	Jan	Feb	Mar	Apr	May	Jun	Jul	Aug	Sep	Oct	Nov	Dec	Year
Record high °C (°F)	10.0 (50.0)	10.5 (50.9)	17.5 (63.5)	28.3 (82.9)	37.0 (98.6)	35.0 (95.0)	36.7 (98.1)	37.2 (99.0)	33.3 (91.9)	29.0 (84.2)	18.3 (64.9)	10.6 (51.1)	37.2 (99.0)
Mean daily maximum °C (°F)	−13.7 (7.3)	−9.2 (15.4)	−2.5 (27.5)	7.5 (45.5)	16.3 (61.3)	20.8 (69.4)	23.0 (73.4)	22.0 (71.6)	15.6 (60.1)	8.2 (46.8)	−3.4 (25.9)	−11.4 (11.5)	6.1 (43.0)
Daily mean °C (°F)	−19.3 (−2.7)	−15.1 (4.8)	−8.7 (16.3)	1.2 (34.2)	9.3 (48.7)	14.0 (57.2)	16.4 (61.5)	15.2 (59.4)	9.4 (48.9)	2.9 (37.2)	−7.7 (18.1)	−16.3 (2.7)	0.1 (32.2)
Mean daily minimum °C (°F)	−24.9 (−12.8)	−20.9 (−5.6)	−14.7 (5.5)	−5 (23)	2.3 (36.1)	7.2 (45.0)	9.9 (49.8)	8.4 (47.1)	3.1 (37.6)	−2.5 (27.5)	−11.9 (10.6)	−21.2 (−6.2)	−5.9 (21.4)
Record low °C (°F)	−48.3 (−54.9)	−45.6 (−50.1)	−46.7 (−52.1)	−36 (−33)	−13.9 (7.0)	−6.7 (19.9)	−1.1 (30.0)	−3.5 (25.7)	−16.7 (1.9)	−22 (−8)	−40.6 (−41.1)	−46.1 (−51.0)	−48.3 (−54.9)
Average precipitation mm (inches)	26.1 (1.03)	20.5 (0.81)	35.0 (1.38)	33.5 (1.32)	48.7 (1.92)	89.7 (3.53)	91.6 (3.61)	64.9 (2.56)	57.5 (2.26)	30.4 (1.20)	26.1 (1.03)	26.2 (1.03)	550.1 (21.66)
Source: Environment Canada

== Demographics ==
Population history (1981–2016)
Year	Pop.	±%
1981	391	—
1986	404	+3.3%
1991	376	−6.9%
1996	331	−12.0%
2001	303	−8.5%
2006	287	−5.3%
2011	283	−1.4%
2016	285	+0.7%
Source: Statistics Canada via Saskatchewan Bureau of Statistics

In the 2021 Census of Population conducted by Statistics Canada, Pelly had a population of 255 living in 131 of its 166 total private dwellings, a change of −10.5% from its 2016 population of 285. With a land area of 0.96 km^{2} (0.37 sq mi), it had a population density of 265.6/km^{2} (688.0/sq mi) in 2021.

In the 2016 Census of Population, the Village of Pelly recorded a population of 285 living in 141 of its 181 total private dwellings, a 0.7% change from its 2011 population of 283. With a land area of 0.96 km^{2} (0.37 sq mi), it had a population density of 296.9/km^{2} (768.9/sq mi) in 2016.

== See also ==
- List of communities in Saskatchewan
- List of villages in Saskatchewan
