= Rural Municipality of Livingston No. 331 =

Rural municipality in Saskatchewan, Canada

Livingston No. 331
- Rural municipality
- Rural Municipality of Livingston No. 331

- Location of the RM of Livingston No. 331 in Saskatchewan
- Coordinates: 52.067°N 101.778°W
- Country: Canada
- Province: Saskatchewan
- Census division: 9
- SARM division: 4
- Formed: January 1, 1913

Government
  - Reeve: Vacant
  - Governing body: RM of Livingston No. 331 Council
  - Administrator: Kelly Kim Rea
  - Office location: Arran

Area (2016)
  - Land: 1,338.85 km^{2} (516.93 sq mi)

Population (2016)
  - Total: 281
  - Density: 0.2/km^{2} (0.52/sq mi)
- Time zone: CST
  - Summer (DST): CST
- Area codes: 306 and 639

The Rural Municipality of Livingston No. 331 (2016 population: 281) is a rural municipality (RM) in the Canadian province of Saskatchewan within Census Division No. 9 and SARM Division No. 4.

== History ==
The RM of Livingston No. 331 incorporated as a rural municipality on January 1, 1913.

== Geography ==
=== Communities and localities ===
The following urban municipalities are surrounded by the RM.

Villages

- Arran

The following unincorporated communities are within the RM.

Localities

- Whitebeech

== Demographics ==
Population history (1981–2016)
Year	Pop.	±%
1981	735	—
1986	608	−17.3%
1991	556	−8.6%
1996	497	−10.6%
2001	427	−14.1%
2006	355	−16.9%
2011	311	−12.4%
2016	281	−9.6%
Source: Statistics Canada via Saskatchewan Bureau of Statistics

In the 2021 Census of Population conducted by Statistics Canada, the RM of Livingston No. 331 had a population of 281 living in 131 of its 158 total private dwellings, a change of 0% from its 2016 population of 281. With a land area of 1,326.24 km^{2} (512.06 sq mi), it had a population density of 0.2/km^{2} (0.5/sq mi) in 2021.

In the 2016 Census of Population, the RM of Livingston No. 331 recorded a population of 281 living in 124 of its 143 total private dwellings, a −9.6% change from its 2011 population of 311. With a land area of 1,338.85 km^{2} (516.93 sq mi), it had a population density of 0.2/km^{2} (0.5/sq mi) in 2016.

== Attractions ==
- Porcupine Hills
- Fort Livingston
- Fort Pelly

== Government ==
The RM of Livingston No. 331 is governed by an elected municipal council and an appointed administrator that meets on the second Wednesday of every month. The reeve of the RM is currently vacant while its administrator is Kelly Kim Rea. The RM's office is located in Arran.

== Transportation ==
- Saskatchewan Highway 49
- Saskatchewan Highway 648
- Saskatchewan Highway 661
- Saskatchewan Highway 753
- Saskatchewan Highway 980
- Canadian National Railway

== See also ==
- List of rural municipalities in Saskatchewan
