= Keeseekoose 66-KE-04 =

Indian reserve in Saskatchewan, Canada

Coordinates: 51°39′48″N 102°15′18″W

- Indian reserve
- Keeseekoose Indian Reserve No. 66-KE-04
- Location in Saskatchewan
- First Nation: Keeseekoose
- Country: Canada
- Province: Saskatchewan

Area
  - Total: 127.3 ha (315 acres)

Population (2016)
  - Total: 0
  - Density: 0.0/km^{2} (0.0/sq mi)

Keeseekoose 66-KE-04 is an Indian reserve of the Keeseekoose First Nation in Saskatchewan. It is about 15 kilometres (9.3 mi) east of Canora. In the 2016 Canadian Census, it was recorded as uninhabited.

== See also ==
- List of Indian reserves in Saskatchewan
