= Chief Yellow Quill =

Plains Ojibway leader

Chief Yellow Quill was a Plains Ojibway leader who tried to stop the whites from moving west of Portage la Prairie, Manitoba. He became an important Plains Ojibway leader in the 1860s and may have participated in the short 1869–1870 Red River Rebellion. After the short conflict ended, the whites knew they had to negotiate with chief Yellow Quill whose Ojibway name is pronounced as O-zah-wah-sko-gwan-na-be which really means Blue Quill and Green Quill.

== The Portage Band ==
O-zah-wah-sko-gwan-na-be was the leader of the Plains Ojibways known as the Portage Band. A dispute arose among the Portage Band after a legitimate heir to a families powerful position took control of those Ojibways after he became of age. In order to avoid civil strife chief Yellow Quill promptly took action. He signed treaty 1 which established three First Nations for the Portage Band in southern Manitoba. They are the Long Plain, Sandy Bay, and Swan Lake First Nations of southern Manitoba. O-zah-wah-sko-gwan-na-be knew the dispute would only benefit the whites so he commenced an Ojibway exodus into Saskatchewan.

== The Exodus ==
In the early and mid-1870s, the Plains Ojibways of southern Manitoba were not getting along which agitated Ojibway leaders. Among them were chief O-zah-wah-sko-gwan-na-be and his councilor (headman) chief Kinistin. They commenced an exodus into the Qu' Appelle Valley of Saskatchewan. The whites did not like it. They had to negotiate with chief O-zah-wah-sko-gwan-na-be once again. Chief Yellow Quill signed an adhesion to treaty 4 which established the Fishing Lake and Nut Lake First Nations of Saskatchewan. However, chief O-zah-wah-sko-gwan-na-be was very aware of the discontent many of the Plains Ojibways of Manitoba and Saskatchewan were feeling and probably instructed Chief Kinistin to commence yet another Ojibway exodus to the north and probably the west. There is a First Nation in Alberta known as the Blue Quill First Nation after all which is shared by several Alberta First Nations. In 1885, chief Kinistin commenced the Ojibway exodus north into the caribou country of the Dene. That be well north of present-day Prince Albert, Saskatchewan and Flin Flon, Manitoba.

== Later life ==
Chief Yellow Quill did not settle down to live permanently in Saskatchewan. He returned to live out the remainder of his life in his native land. He settled down to live on the Swan Lake First Nation of southern Manitoba. He died there in 1910 of natural causes. In 1989, the Nut Lake First Nation changed their name to the Yellow Quill First Nation.
