= Keeseekoose 66-CA-06 =

Indian reserve in Saskatchewan, Canada

Coordinates: 51°13′16″N 101°43′10″W

- Indian reserve
- Keeseekoose Indian Reserve No. 66-CA-06
- Location in Saskatchewan
- First Nation: Keeseekoose
- Country: Canada
- Province: Saskatchewan

Area
  - Total: 322.5 ha (797 acres)

Population (2016)
  - Total: 0
  - Density: 0.0/km^{2} (0.0/sq mi)

Keeseekoose 66-CA-06 is an Indian reserve of the Keeseekoose First Nation in Saskatchewan. It is about 54 kilometres (34 mi) east of Yorkton. In the 2016 Canadian Census, it recorded a population of 0 living in 0 of its 1 total private dwellings.

== See also ==
- List of Indian reserves in Saskatchewan
