= Hyas, Saskatchewan =

Village in Saskatchewan, Canada

Hyas
- Village
- Village of Hyas
- Location of Hyas in Saskatchewan Hyas (Canada)
- Coordinates: 51.8944°N 102.259°W
- Country: Canada
- Province: Saskatchewan
- Region: East-central
- Census division: 9
- Rural municipality: Clayton No. 333
- Post office Founded: 1912-06-01

Government
  - Type: Municipal
  - Governing body: Hyas Village Council
  - Mayor: Shannon Amon Makuk
  - Administrator: Karen Markowski
  - MLA - Yorkton—Melville: Terry Dennis (2020)
  - M.P.: Cathay Wagontal

Area
  - Total: 1.17 km^{2} (0.45 sq mi)

Population (2021)
  - Total: 96
  - Density: 59.6/km^{2} (154/sq mi)
- Time zone: UTC-6 (CST)
- Postal code: S0A 1K0
- Area code: 306
- Highways: Highway 49 Highway 650
- Railways: Canadian National Railway
- Website: Village of Hyas

Hyas (2016 population: 70) is a village in the Canadian province of Saskatchewan within the Rural Municipality of Clayton No. 333 and Census Division No. 9.

== History ==
Hyas incorporated as a village on May 23, 1919.

== Demographics ==
Population history (1981–2016)
Year	Pop.	±%
1981	165	—
1986	167	+1.2%
1991	135	−19.2%
1996	119	−11.9%
2001	131	+10.1%
2006	111	−15.3%
2011	114	+2.7%
2016	70	−38.6%
Source: Statistics Canada via Saskatchewan Bureau of Statistics

In the 2021 Census of Population conducted by Statistics Canada, Hyas had a population of 89 living in 53 of its 65 total private dwellings, a change of 36.9% from its 2016 population of 65. With a land area of 0.41 km^{2} (0.16 sq mi), it had a population density of 217.1/km^{2} (562.2/sq mi) in 2021.

In the 2016 Census of Population, the Village of Hyas recorded a population of 70 living in 39 of its 49 total private dwellings, a −62.9% change from its 2011 population of 114. With a land area of 1.17 km^{2} (0.45 sq mi), it had a population density of 59.8/km^{2} (155.0/sq mi) in 2016.

== See also ==
- List of communities in Saskatchewan
- List of villages in Saskatchewan
