= Kinistin =

Chief Kinistin (c. 1850–c. 1920) was an Ojibwe councilor (headman) of Chief Ošāwaškokwanēpi (Yellow-quill).

== Background ==
"Kinistin" or Kiništin (meaning "Cree") came to Saskatchewan from Western Ontario along with his two brothers, Miskokwanep ("Red [Crow-]Feather") and Mehcihcākanihs ("Coyote"). Chief Kinistin possibly participated in the 1869-1870 Red River Rebellion.

== Exodus into Saskatchewan ==
During the Treaty 1 negotiations, Yellow Quill and Kinistin agreed to the treaty terms but a dispute arose among the Plains Ojibwe of southern Manitoba which led Yellow Quill and other Ojibwe chiefs including Kinistin, to commence an exodus into Saskatchewan in the 1870s. They settled in the Qu'Appelle River valley. An agreement to observe to Treaty 4 was signed on August 24, 1876, at Fort Pelly, which established the Nut Lake Band.

== Further exodus to the north ==
During the 1880s, amid unrest among the Plains Ojibwe over whether to maintain traditional way of life, Kinistin broke from Yellow Quill and camped in the parkland of the Barrier River district. Uprooting his people again in 1885 to avoid the North-West Rebellion, he moved north into the caribou country of the . After searching for good hunting grounds not claimed by other larger tribes, Kinistin and his people resided in the Pasquia Hills of northeastern Saskatchewan, well north of what is now Prince Albert and Flin Flon, Manitoba. Following Riel’Denes defeat, Kinistin returned to Barrier River to choose a reserve. In February 1890 he sent for Reginald Beatty, extracting a promise to aid him in securing a reserve along the Barrier River/ The two secured reserve areas that became the base for the present Kinistin Saulteaux Nation in 1900.

== Descendants ==
The Ojibwe descendants of Kinistin's subjects live on the Hatchet Lake First Nation, Lac La Ronge First Nation, Peter Ballantyne Cree Nation, Barren Lands First Nation, Mathias Colomb First Nation, Marcel Colomb First Nation, and the Northlands First Nation of Manitoba.
