= Lintlaw =

Village in Saskatchewan, Canada

- Village
- Village of Lintlaw
- Location of Lintlaw in Saskatchewan Lintlaw (Canada)
- Coordinates: 52°03′57″N 103°14′39″W
- Country: Canada
- Province: Saskatchewan
- Region: Southeast
- Census division: 9
- Rural municipality: Hazel Dell No. 335
- Post office Founded: November 1, 1910

Government
  - Type: Municipal
  - Mayor: Tammy Bocking
  - Administrator: Lisa Jankowski

Area
  - Total: 1.23 km^{2} (0.47 sq mi)

Population (2021)
  - Total: 150
  - Density: 120.9/km^{2} (313/sq mi)
- Time zone: UTC-6 (CST)
- Postal code: S0A 2H0
- Area code: 306
- Highways: Highway 49 Highway 617
- Railways: Pulled

Lintlaw (2021 population: 150) is a village in the Canadian province of Saskatchewan within the Rural Municipality of Hazel Dell No. 335 and Census Division No. 9. The village is located at the intersection of Highway 49 and Highway 617, 142 km northwest of the city of Yorkton.

== History ==
Lintlaw incorporated as a village on December 14, 1921.

== Demographics ==
Population history (1981–2016)
| Year | Pop. | ±% |
|---|---|---|
| 1981 | 234 | — |
| 1986 | 238 | +1.7% |
| 1991 | 223 | −6.3% |
| 1996 | 208 | −6.7% |
| 2001 | 187 | −10.1% |
| 2006 | 145 | −22.5% |
| 2011 | 162 | +11.7% |
| 2016 | 172 | +6.2% |
Source: Statistics Canada via Saskatchewan Bureau of Statistics

In the 2021 Census of Population conducted by Statistics Canada, Lintlaw had a population of 150 living in 64 of its 94 total private dwellings, a change of −12.8% from its 2016 population of 172. With a land area of 1.24 km^{2} (0.48 sq mi), it had a population density of 121.0/km^{2} (313.3/sq mi) in 2021.

In the 2016 Census of Population, the Village of Lintlaw recorded a population of 172 living in 76 of its 89 total private dwellings, a 5.8% change from its 2011 population of 162. With a land area of 1.23 km^{2} (0.47 sq mi), it had a population density of 139.8/km^{2} (362.2/sq mi) in 2016.

== See also ==
- List of communities in Saskatchewan
- List of villages in Saskatchewan
