= Danbury, Saskatchewan =

Community in Saskatchewan, Canada

Coordinates: 52°03′23″N 102°14′38″W

Location of Danbury in Saskatchewan

Danbury is a hamlet in the Canadian province of Saskatchewan within the Rural Municipality of Clayton No. 333 and Census Division No. 9.

== History ==
Settlers began arriving to Danbury in 1911, and a school district was organized in 1914. A post office was established the following year.

== See also ==
- List of communities in Saskatchewan
