= Kinistin 91A =

Indian reserve in Saskatchewan, Canada

Coordinates: 52°29′09″N 104°13′17″W

- Indian reserve
- Kinistin Indian Reserve No. 91A
- Location in Saskatchewan
- First Nation: Kinistin
- Country: Canada
- Province: Saskatchewan

Area
  - Total: 457.3 ha (1,130 acres)

Kinistin 91A is an Indian reserve of the Kinistin Saulteaux Nation in Saskatchewan.

== See also ==
- List of Indian reserves in Saskatchewan
