= Reg Beatty =

Australian cricketer

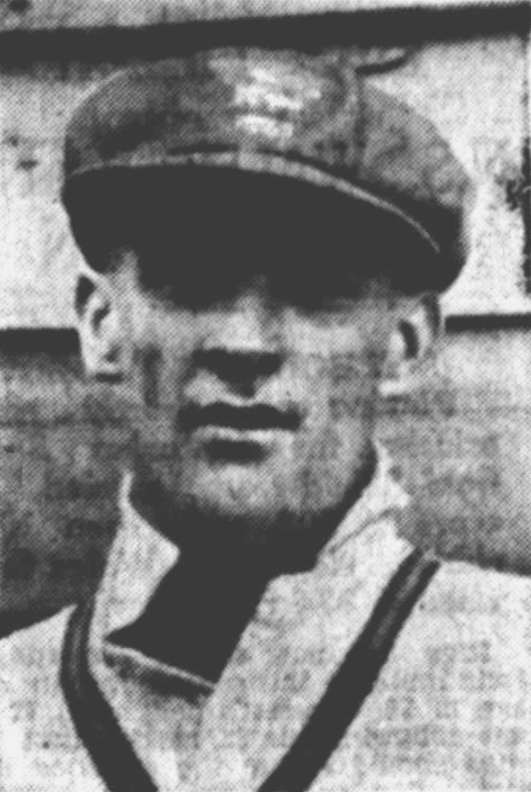

Personal information
- Full name: Reginald George Beatty
- Born: 24 December 1913; Wickham, New South Wales, Australia
- Died: 27 May 1957 (aged 43); Waratah, New South Wales, Australia
- Source: Cricinfo, 22 December 2016

Reg Beatty (24 December 1913 – 27 May 1957) was an Australian cricketer. He played four first-class matches for New South Wales in 1936/37.

== See also ==
- List of New South Wales representative cricketers
