= Norquay, Saskatchewan =

Town in Saskatchewan, Canada

Town of Norquay
- Motto: Where Prairie Meets Pine
- Location of Norquay in Saskatchewan Town of Norquay (Canada)
- Coordinates: 51°53′03″N 102°05′22″W
- Country: Canada
- Province: Saskatchewan
- Census division: 9
- Rural municipality: Clayton No. 333
- Post office Founded: N/A
- Incorporated (Village): N/A
- Incorporated (Town): N/A

Government
  - Mayor: Brennan Twerdoclib
  - Governing body: Norquay Town Council

Area
  - Total: 1.69 km^{2} (0.65 sq mi)

Population (2001)
  - Total: 485
  - Density: 287.6/km^{2} (745/sq mi)
- Time zone: CST
- Postal code: S0A 2V0
- Area code: 306
- Highways: Highway 8 / Highway 49 / Highway 637
- Website: http://www.norquay.ca/

Norquay is a town in the Canadian province of Saskatchewan. It was named after John Norquay, premier of Manitoba from 1878 to 1887. It is the administrative headquarters of the Key Saulteaux First Nation band government.

== Demographics ==
In the 2021 Census of Population conducted by Statistics Canada, Norquay had a population of 420 living in 187 of its 227 total private dwellings, a change of −3.2% from its 2016 population of 434. With a land area of 1.62 km^{2} (0.63 sq mi), it had a population density of 259.3/km^{2} (671.5/sq mi) in 2021.

== See also ==
- List of communities in Saskatchewan
- List of towns in Saskatchewan
