= Arran, Saskatchewan =

Community in Saskatchewan, Canada

Arran
- Special service area
- Location of Arran in Saskatchewan Arran (Canada)
- Coordinates: 51.5304°N 101.4307°W
- Country: Canada
- Province: Saskatchewan
- Region: Southeastern
- Census division: 9
- Rural municipality: Livingston No. 331
- Incorporated (village): September 21, 1916
- Dissolved: January 1, 2023

Government
  - Type: Arran Village Council
  - Mayor: Brenda Holtkamp

Area
  - Land: 0.72 km^{2} (0.28 sq mi)

Population (2021)
  - Total: 20
- Time zone: CST
- Postal code: S0A 0B0
- Area code: 306

Arran (2021 population: 20) is a special service area in the Canadian province of Saskatchewan within the Rural Municipality of Livingston No. 331 and Census Division No. 9. It held village status between 1916 and 2022.

== History ==
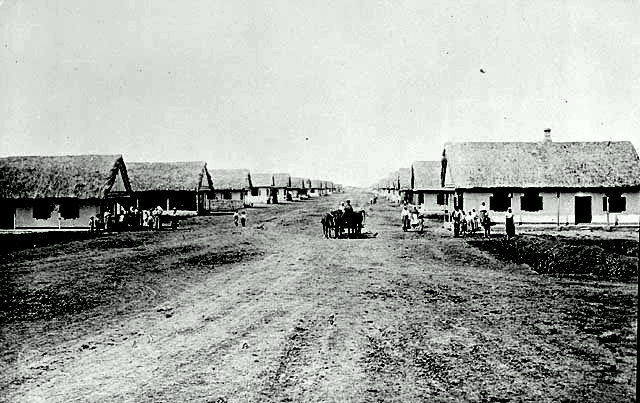
The Doukhobor settlement of Vosnesinia, on the Swan River northeast of Arran, in the early 1900s

The area around Arran was part of the "North Reserve", also known as "Thunder Hill Reserve", one of the block settlement areas allocated for the Doukhobor immigrants who arrived in 1899 from Russia's Transcaucasian provinces.

Arran incorporated as a village on September 21, 1916. It restructured on January 1, 2023, relinquishing its village status in favour of becoming a special service area under the jurisdiction of the Rural Municipality of Livingston No. 331. The community was named after the Isle of Arran in Scotland.

Historic sites

- Ukrainian Orthodox Church of Ascension, 9.5 kilometres southeast of Arran.

== Geography ==
Arran is on Highway 49 approximately 90 km (56 mi) northeast of the city of Yorkton and 10 km (6.2 mi) west of the Manitoba boundary.

=== Climate ===
Climate data for Arran
Month	Jan	Feb	Mar	Apr	May	Jun	Jul	Aug	Sep	Oct	Nov	Dec	Year
Record high °C (°F)	7.2 (45.0)	12.5 (54.5)	13 (55)	28.9 (84.0)	38.5 (101.3)	36.5 (97.7)	36.5 (97.7)	36.1 (97.0)	35 (95)	29 (84)	18.3 (64.9)	7 (45)	38.5 (101.3)
Mean daily maximum °C (°F)	−12.5 (9.5)	−9.1 (15.6)	−2.3 (27.9)	8 (46)	17.7 (63.9)	22.1 (71.8)	23.9 (75.0)	22.9 (73.2)	16.2 (61.2)	8.8 (47.8)	−3 (27)	−11.3 (11.7)	6.8 (44.2)
Daily mean °C (°F)	−18.4 (−1.1)	−15.3 (4.5)	−8.4 (16.9)	1.9 (35.4)	10.4 (50.7)	15 (59)	17.1 (62.8)	15.8 (60.4)	9.7 (49.5)	3.2 (37.8)	−7.6 (18.3)	−16.6 (2.1)	0.6 (33.1)
Mean daily minimum °C (°F)	−24.2 (−11.6)	−21.4 (−6.5)	−14.4 (6.1)	−4.2 (24.4)	3 (37)	7.8 (46.0)	10.3 (50.5)	8.7 (47.7)	3.2 (37.8)	−2.5 (27.5)	−12.1 (10.2)	−21.8 (−7.2)	−5.6 (21.9)
Record low °C (°F)	−43.9 (−47.0)	−44.5 (−48.1)	−38.5 (−37.3)	−30 (−22)	−10 (14)	−5 (23)	0 (32)	−2 (28)	−8.9 (16.0)	−23 (−9)	−37 (−35)	−44 (−47)	−44.5 (−48.1)
Average precipitation mm (inches)	19.1 (0.75)	15.7 (0.62)	26.4 (1.04)	30.8 (1.21)	40.5 (1.59)	73.1 (2.88)	77.6 (3.06)	63.4 (2.50)	55.9 (2.20)	25.6 (1.01)	20.1 (0.79)	19.9 (0.78)	468 (18.4)
Source: Environment Canada

== Demographics ==
Population history (1981–2021)
Year	Pop.	±%
1981	93	—
1986	88	−5.4%
1991	59	−33.0%
1996	53	−10.2%
2001	55	+3.8%
2006	40	−27.3%
2011	40	+0.0%
2016	25	−37.5%
2021	20	−20.0%
Source: Statistics Canada via Saskatchewan Bureau of Statistics

In the 2021 Census of Population conducted by Statistics Canada, Arran had a population of 20 living in 8 of its 15 total private dwellings, a change of −20% from its 2016 population of 25. With a land area of 0.72 km^{2} (0.28 sq mi), it had a population density of 27.8/km^{2} (71.9/sq mi) in 2021.

In the 2016 Census of Population, Arran had a population of 25 living in 14 of its 25 total private dwellings, a −60% change from its 2011 population of 40. With a land area of 0.69 km^{2} (0.27 sq mi), it had a population density of 36.2/km^{2} (93.8/sq mi) in 2016.

== Education ==
Arran School opened on November 30, 1914, and closed on June 30, 1994.

== See also ==
- List of communities in Saskatchewan
- List of villages in Saskatchewan
