= Keeseekoose 66 =

Indian reserve in Saskatchewan, Canada

Coordinates: 51°43′03″N 101°56′30″W

- Indian reserve
- Keeseekoose Indian Reserve No. 66
- Location in Saskatchewan
- First Nation: Keeseekoose
- Country: Canada
- Province: Saskatchewan

Area
  - Total: 4,415.9 ha (10,912 acres)

Population (2016)
  - Total: 491
  - Density: 11.1/km^{2} (28.8/sq mi)
- Community Well-Being Index: 50

Keeseekoose 66 is an Indian reserve of the Keeseekoose First Nation in Saskatchewan. It is about 16 kilometres (9.9 mi) north of Kamsack. In the 2016 Canadian Census, it recorded a population of 491 living in 135 of its 155 total private dwellings. In the same year, its Community Well-Being index was calculated at 50 of 100, compared to 58.4 for the average First Nations community and 77.5 for the average non-Indigenous community.

Access is from Highway 8.

== See also ==
- List of Indian reserves in Saskatchewan
