= Cote 64 =

Indian reserve in Saskatchewan, Canada

Coordinates: 51°37′33″N 101°53′52″W

- Indian reserve
- Cote Indian Reserve No. 64
- Location in Saskatchewan
- First Nation: Cote
- Country: Canada
- Province: Saskatchewan

Area
  - Total: 8,088.2 ha (19,986 acres)

Population (2016)
  - Total: 748
  - Density: 9.25/km^{2} (24.0/sq mi)
- Community Well-Being Index: 51

Cote 64 is an Indian reserve of the Cote First Nation in Saskatchewan. It is 16 kilometres (9.9 mi) west of the Manitoba border. In the 2016 Canadian Census, it recorded a population of 748 living in 220 of its 269 total private dwellings. In the same year, its Community Well-Being index was calculated at 51 of 100, compared to 58.4 for the average First Nations community and 77.5 for the average non-Indigenous community.

Access is from Highway 8.

== See also ==
- List of Indian reserves in Saskatchewan
