= Okla, Saskatchewan =

Hamlet in Saskatchewan, Canada

Coordinates: 52°00′49″N 103°06′29″W

Okla is a hamlet in the Canadian province of Saskatchewan.

== Demographics ==
In the 2021 Census of Population conducted by Statistics Canada, Okla had a population of 20 living in 9 of its 11 total private dwellings, a change of 100% from its 2016 population of 10. With a land area of 0.41 km^{2} (0.16 sq mi), it had a population density of 48.8/km^{2} (126.3/sq mi) in 2021.
