= Fort Pelly =

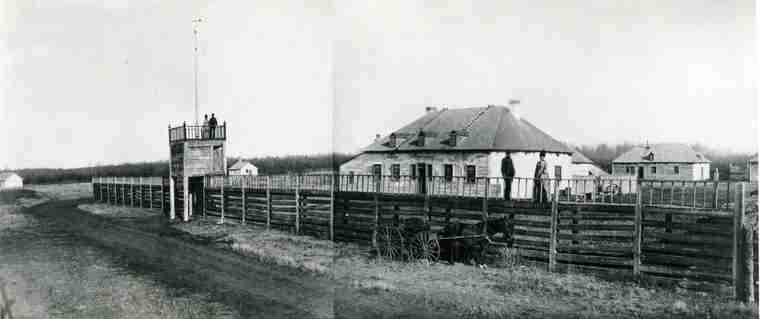
- Fort Pelly in 1887 (second fort)
- Interactive map of Fort Pelly
- Type: Fort, Military Structure, fur trading post
- Etymology: Sir John Pelly, governor of the Hudson's Bay Company
- Location: Pelly, Saskatchewan, Canada
- Nearest city: Yorkton, Saskatchewan
- Founder: Hudson's Bay Company
- Built: First fort 1824; Second fort 1856
- Governing body: Parks Canada
- Website: Parks Canada official website

National Historic Site of Canada
- Designated: 1953

Fort Pelly was a Hudson's Bay Company fur trading post located in the Canadian province of Saskatchewan. The fort was named after Sir John Pelly, governor of the Hudson's Bay Company. The current village of Pelly, Saskatchewan, takes its name from the fort, and is located approximately 8 miles north of the site of the fort.

== The first fort ==
Before Fort Pelly was built there was a Fort Hibernia in the general area.

The first Fort Pelly, at 51°46′42″N 102°00′19″W, was constructed by the Hudson's Bay Company in 1824, in the northeast corner of the elbow of the Assiniboine River. It was situated at a convenient portage point between the Assiniboine and Swan Rivers. Since the upper Assiniboine is shallow and crooked the area was most easily reached from the Swan River. The route was Lake Winnipegosis - Swan River - Snake Creek - Miry Creek - portage to the Assiboine River. It was the administrative centre of the Hudson's Bay Company's Swan River District.

Fort Pelly consisted of a dwelling house, and Indian house, several staff houses, a store, and stables, all enclosed within a square palisade, 120 feet a side. Its first chief trader was Alan McDonell, who had selected the site and oversaw construction. The fort traded with Cree and Salteaux Natives from the surrounding area, along with recruiting employees from both nations. In 1841 Fort Pelly had four employees, along with their Métis families. The first fort was destroyed by fire in the winter of 1842 and rebuilt immediately by chief trader Cuthbert Cumming. In 1849 Thomas McKay, who would become first mayor of Prince Albert and a prominent territorial politician, was born at Fort Pelly.

== The second fort ==
Fort Pelly was moved to 51°46′35″N 101°59′51″W in 1856. This move, to approximately one quarter mile southeast of the original position, was due to problems with occasional flooding at the old location. The old fort was however still used in some capacity until at least 1859. On July 15, 1870, the Hudson's Bay Company surrendered its lands to Canada, while retaining its posts and some land immediately surrounding them. The fort was now located on block 17 of the Fort Pelly Reserve. Around 1871 Fort Ellice succeeded Fort Pelly as district headquarters. In 1909 the Canadian Northern Railway was built 6 miles north of Fort Pelly, and trade at the fort all but ceased, and it was abandoned in June, 1912.

== Current status ==
During the summers of 1971 and 1972, the former fort sites were excavated by the Saskatchewan Museum of Natural History, at which time all known buildings were located, and 7,000 objects were recovered.

The first Fort Pelly site was designated a Historic Site by the Province of Saskatchewan in 1986 and is operated by the Saskatchewan Parks Service.

The site of the second fort was purchased by the Fort Pelly Historical Society and was designated a National Historic Site of Canada in 1953.
