= Keeseekoose First Nation =

Band government

- Band No. 367
- People: Saulteaux
- Treaty: Treaty 4
- Headquarters: Kamsack
- Province: Saskatchewan

Land
- Main reserve: Keeseekoose 66
- Reserve: Keeseekoose 66A-66ST04
- Land area: 79.554 km^{2} (30.716 sq mi)

Population (2019)
- On reserve: 711
- Off reserve: 1814
- Total population: 2525

Government
- Chief: Alvin Musqua Jr.
- Council: 1. Henry Keshane; 2. Beverly Keshane; 3. Nicole Quewezance; 4. Dustin Musqua; 5. Glen Kitchemonia; 6. Lyndon Musqua; 7. Lorenz Keshane; 8. Clarisse Straightnose; 9. Ambrose Musqua; 10. Kevin Musqua; 11. Craig Straightnose; 12. Jamie Brass

Tribal Council
- Yorkton Tribal Administration Tribal Chief Isabelle O'Soup

Website
- keeseekoose.com

The Keeseekoose First Nation (Ojibwe: Giizhigoons Anishinaabeg) is a Saulteaux band government located in Kamsack, Saskatchewan. The band is named for Chief Kiishikouse (kîšîkôns, Giizhigoons, "little sky"), who signed an adhesion to Treaty 4 at Swan Lake, Manitoba in 1875. Flooding on the band's Manitoba reserve forced a relocation to the band's current location, adjacent to the Cote First Nation reserve. Those who stayed in Manitoba are today known as the Pine Creek First Nation. The current population is approximately 2750 people, with the majority living abroad and in urban centers across Canada.

Keeseekoose is well known for producing strong talent in junior and senior hockey. One notable hockey player between 1950 and 1960 was Leonard Ketchemonia, who has earned many accolades throughout his career. In golf, Ashley Straightnose is also notable in Saskatchewan and other parts of western Canada.

== Reserves ==
The Keeseekoose First Nation has 24 reserves and shares the Treaty Four Reserve Grounds 77 with many other Treaty Four First Nations. Total on-reserve population is 679 and off-reserve population is 1,564, making the total population 2,243. When including the Cote First Nations with whom they share the same reserve, the total population is 5,726. The area covered by the Keeseekoose Reserves is 8,475 hectares (20,942 acres). When including the Cote, the area increases to near 41,000 acres or 16,567 hectares.

== History ==
Originally, the Keeseekoose Saulteaux people lived on the plains of Manitoba and probably the forest to the north. Their food supply was largely buffalo, from which pemmican was prepared. They also hunted the forest for deer, moose and other wild game. They probably harvested the wild rice that grew on the waterways of Manitoba, and was probably one of their major food sources. Chief Keeseekoose saw that his subjects were going hungry in the early 1870s and put their welfare first and signed treaty four on September 15, 1874. While half of the people wanted to fish and hunt, the others wanted to farm and ranch. This prompted a decision from Chief Kisickonse after the Swan River First Nation of Manitoba was established. Under the leadership of Chief Kisickonse and after Treaty Four was signed, many of the tribe relocated to the present location where the land is more suitable for farming and ranching.
