= Frame =

A frame is often a structural system that supports other components of a physical construction and/or steel frame that limits the construction's extent.

Frame and FRAME may also refer to:

== Physical objects ==
=== In building construction ===
- Framing (construction), a building term known as light frame construction
- Framer, a carpenter who assembles major structural elements in constructing a building
- A-frame, a basic structure designed to bear a load in a lightweight economical manner
  - A-frame house, a house following the same principle
- Door frame or window frame, fixed structures to which the hinges of doors or windows are attached
- Frame and panel, a method of woodworking
- Space frame, a method of construction using lightweight or light materials
- Timber framing, a method of building for creating framed structures of heavy timber or willow wood

=== In vehicles ===
- Frame (aircraft), structural rings in an aircraft fuselage
- Frame (nautical), the skeleton of a boat
- Bicycle frame, the main component of a bicycle, onto which other components are fitted
  - Motorcycle frame, main component of a motorbike, onto which other components are fitted
- Locomotive frame, a structure that forms the backbone of a railway locomotive
- Vehicle frame, to which everything on an automobile is mounted

=== Other physical objects ===
- Frame (loudspeaker) or basket, a structural component which supports the functional components of a loudspeaker
- Bed frame, the part of a bed used to position the mattress and base
- Climbing frame or jungle gym, a piece of equipment for children's play
- Eyeglass frame
- Lever frame, a railway signalling device containing interlocks for signals, points (railroad switches) etc.
- Picture frame, a solid border around a picture or painting
- Receiver (firearms) or frame, one of the basic parts of a modern firearm
- Spinning frame, an invention of the Industrial Revolution for spinning thread or yarn from fibre such as wool or cotton
- Water frame, a water-powered spinning frame which was an easy way to create cotton
- Frame (beekeeping), a wooden frame designed to hold an area of honeycomb in a Langstroth-type beehive

== Mathematics and physics ==
- Generally speaking, a coordinate frame that defines a coordinate system
  - Frame of reference, in physics, a set of reference points that define a coordinate system
  - Frame (geometry), the combination of an origin and an ordered basis of a vector space
  - Frame (linear algebra), a generalization of a basis to sets of possibly linearly dependent vectors which also satisfy the frame condition
  - k-frame, a generalization of a basis to linearly independent sets of vectors that need not span the space
  - Affine frame, in an affine space and, in particular, in a Euclidean space
  - Projective frame, in projective geometry
  - Orthonormal frame, in Riemannian geometry
  - Moving frame, in differential geometry
  - Frame bundle, a principal fiber bundle associated with any vector bundle
- Frames and locales, in order theory
- Sampling frame, a set of items or events possible to measure (statistics)

== Computing and telecommunications ==
=== In displays ===
- Frame (GUI), a box used to hold other widgets in a graphical user interface
- Film frame, one of the many single photographic images in a motion picture
- Photographic film frame, one of the many segments recorded in a photographic film
- Frame rate, the number of frames—or images—displayed on screen per unit of time, usually expressed in frames per second (FPS)
- Framing (World Wide Web), a method of displaying multiple HTML documents on one page of a web browser
  - Iframes, a frame element in HTML code

=== Software ===
- Adobe FrameMaker, a desktop publishing application
- Google Chrome Frame, an open source plug-in designed for Internet Explorer
- Software framework

=== Other uses in computing and telecommunications ===
- Frame (artificial intelligence), machine-usable formalizations of concepts or schemata that can be used for knowledge representation
- Frame (networking), a data transmission unit or network packet that includes frame synchronization information
- Distribution frame, in telecommunications
- Mainframe computer
- Page frame, an available chunk of memory
- Stack frame, a part of a call stack
- A data structure in frame languages
- Frame problem, in artificial intelligence
- Framing, the application of networking frames using frame synchronization
- Frame technology (software engineering), a models-to-code system based on adaptable frames

== Other sciences ==
- Filters, random fields, and maximum entropy model (FRAME), in physics and probability
- Fund for the Replacement of Animals in Medical Experiments
- Frame Overo, a coat pattern in horses
- Hive frame, a structural element that holds honeycomb
- Reading frame, which divides a sequence of nucleotides into a set of consecutive, non-overlapping triplets
- Frameshift mutation, when a single base-pair is added to a DNA string, causing incorrect transcription
- Frame analysis, a social science research method used to analyze how people understand situations and activities
- FRAMES, methods of brief intervention against alcohol misuse
- Framing (social sciences), in communication theory and sociology, relating to the contextual presentation of media content

== Arts and media ==
=== Film and television ===
- "Frame" (Law & Order: Criminal Intent), a 2008 episode of the TV series Law & Order: Criminal Intent
- The Frame (film), a 2014 American science fiction film
- Frames Production, an Indian multifaceted production company

=== Literature ===
- Frame story, a narrative technique, for telling stories within a story
- Frame (design magazine), from the Netherlands
- Frame (1971–1990), a book of collected poetry by Barrett Watten, published in 1997

=== Music ===
- The Frames, an Irish band
- Frames (Oceansize album), 2007, by Oceansize
- Frames (Lee DeWyze album), a 2013 album by Lee DeWyze

=== Visual arts ===
- The Frame (painting), by Frida Kahlo

== Other uses ==
- Frame, in the game of snooker
- Frame, in the game of bowling
- Frame, in the game of baseball
- Frame (dance), either of two concepts in partner dancing
- Frame (surname)
- Frame (company), Los Angeles women's denim brand
- Frame, West Virginia, an unincorporated community, US
- Frame of government, a descriptive term synonymous with constitution
  - Frame of Government of Pennsylvania, the first colonial constitution of Pennsylvania, written by William Penn
  - Delegates to the 1787 United States Constitutional Convention, are sometimes called the "Framers," as they were framing a form of government
- Frameup, to make an innocent party appear guilty of someone else's crime
- French Regional & American Museums Exchange (FRAME), an alliance of French and American art museums
- Frame (psychotherapy)
- Dubai Frame, a building in Dubai, UAE
- The Frame (Christchurch), an urban renewal project in New Zealand

== See also ==
- Framework (disambiguation)
- Framing (disambiguation)
- X-frame (disambiguation)
