= Framed =

Framed may refer to:

== Common meanings ==
- A painting or photograph that has been placed within a picture frame
- Someone falsely shown to be guilty of a crime as part of a frameup

== Film and television ==
- Framed (1930 film), a pre-code crime action starring Evelyn Brent, Regis Toomey and Ralf Harolde
- Framed (1940 film), an American crime film
- Framed (1947 film), a film noir starring Glenn Ford and Janis Carter
- Framed (1975 film), a crime drama based on a novel starring Joe Don Baker and Conny Van Dyke
- Framed (1990 film), HBO made-for-television film starring Jeff Goldblum
- Framed (TV series), a 1992 drama series of 4 x 1hr episodes, and cut to a 2hr TV film for the US (and elsewhere) in 1993
- "Framed" (Spider-Man: 1994 TV series), a 1996 episode of the animated series
- "Framed" (Dexter's Laboratory), a 1998 television episode
- Framed (2002 film), TNT made-for-television film remake of the 1992 TV series starring Rob Lowe
- Framed (U.S. TV program), an interview series that began in 2008
- Framed (2009 film), BBC made-for-television film based on the Frank Cottrell Boyce novel

== Literature ==
- Framed (Cottrell Boyce novel), 2005 children's book by Frank Cottrell Boyce
- Framed!, the first novel in the Traces series by Malcolm Rose
- Framed (Korman novel), 2010 novel by Gordon Korman, the third in the Swindle series

== Other uses ==
- Framed (Asleep at the Wheel album), a 1980 album
- Framed (Sensational Alex Harvey Band album), a 1972 album
- "Framed", a song written by Jerry Leiber and Mike Stoller in 1954, also recorded by The Robins, Ritchie Valens, Jerry Reed, and Cheech & Chong.
- "Framed" (Eminem song), 2018
- Framed (video game), a 2014 video game developed by Loveshack

== See also ==
- Framing (disambiguation)
- Frame (disambiguation)
