= Frame (surname) =

Frame is a surname. Notable people with the surname include:

- Billy Frame (1912–1992), Scottish footballer
- Bobby Frame (1959–2025), American politician in Oklahoma
- Elizabeth Frame, Canadian writer and historian
- Esther G. Frame (1840–1920), American Quaker minister and evangelist
- Fred Frame (1894–1962), American race car driver
- Janet Frame (1924–2004), New Zealand writer
- John Frame (disambiguation), several people
- Linley Frame (born 1971), Australian swimmer
- Margaret Frame (1903–1985), Canadian painter
- Margaret Frame, British biologist
- Pete Frame (born 1942), English music journalist
- Peter Frame (1957–2018), American ballet dancer
- Roddy Frame (born 1964), Scottish singer-songwriter and musician (Aztec Camera)
- Tom Frame (1931–2006), British comic letterer
- Tom Frame (born 1962), Australian Anglican Bishop
- William Frame (1848–1906), English architect
- William Frame (cricketer) (1932–1965), New Zealand cricketer and murder-suicide perpetrator
- Willie Frame (fl. 1920s), Scottish footballer for Clyde, Motherwell and Linfield
- Willie Frame (curler), Scottish curler, European champion

== Fictional characters ==
- Alice Frame and Steve Frame, on the soap opera Another World
