= Frame Technology =

Frame Technology may refer to:

- Frame technology (software engineering), a modularity framework
- Frame Technology Corporation, the original developers of the desktop publishing software Adobe FrameMaker
