= Fort Qu'Appelle =

Town in Saskatchewan, Canada

- Town
- Town of Fort Qu'Appelle
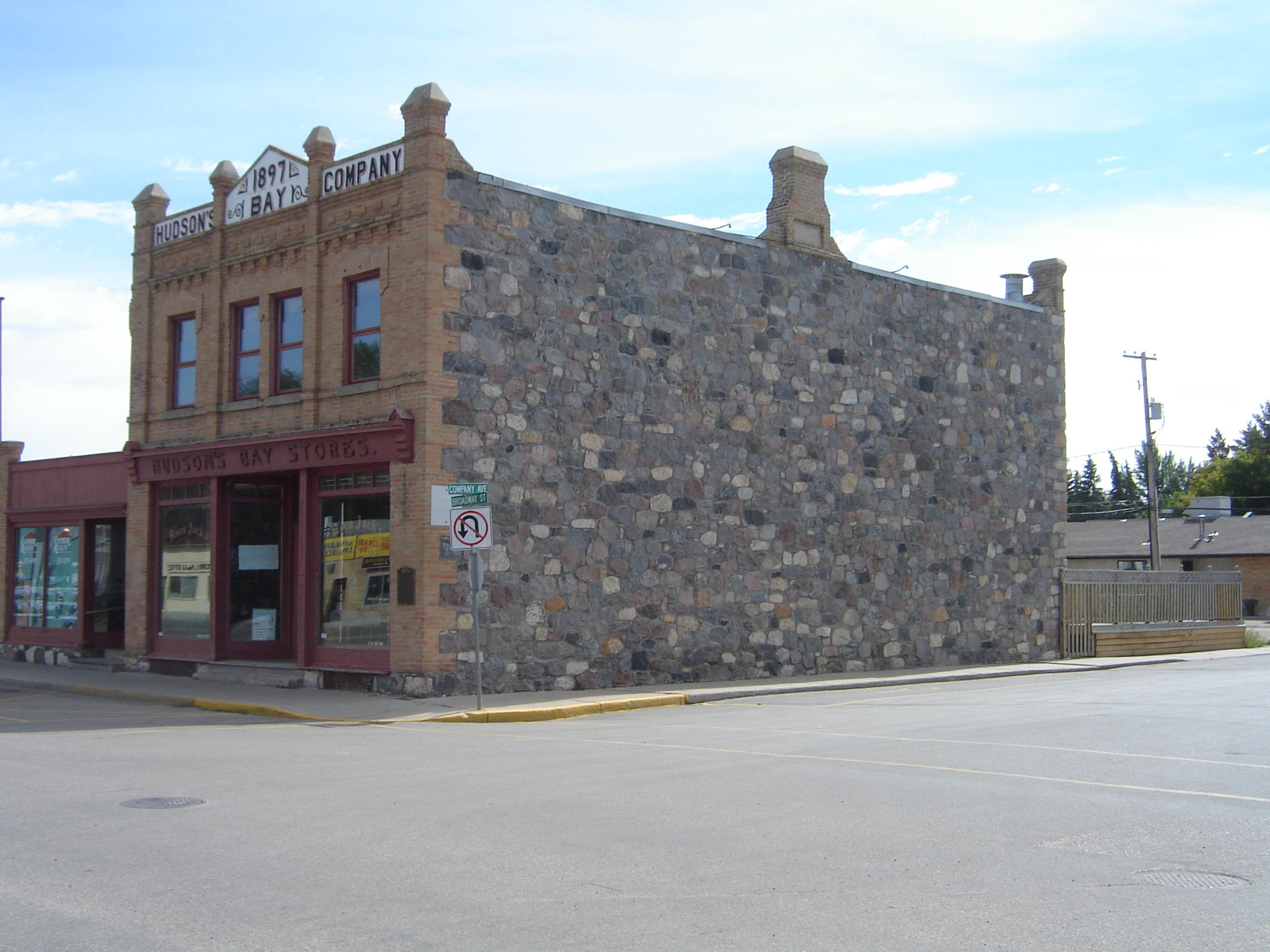
- 1897 Hudson's Bay Company store in Fort Qu'Appelle
- Nickname: "The Fort"
- Location of Fort Qu'Appelle Fort Qu'Appelle (Canada)
- Coordinates: 50°45′56″N 103°47′25″W
- Country: Canada
- Province: Saskatchewan
- Rural Municipality: North Qu'Appelle No. 187
- Post office Founded: 1880
- Incorporated (town): 1951

Government
  - Governing body: Fort Qu'Appelle Town Council
  - Mayor: Brian Strong
  - Administrator: Don R. McLeod

Area
  - Total: 5.28 km^{2} (2.04 sq mi)

Population (2006)
  - Total: 1,919
  - Density: 363.2/km^{2} (941/sq mi)
- Time zone: UTC-06:00 (CST)
- Postal code: S0G 1S0
- Area code: 306
- Waterways: Qu'Appelle River; Echo Lake; Mission Lake; Echo Creek
- Website: Fort Qu'Appelle, Saskatchewan

National Historic Site of Canada
- Official name: Fort Qu'Appelle National Historic Site of Canada
- Designated: 1953

Fort Qu'Appelle (/kəˈpɛl/) is a town in the Canadian province of Saskatchewan located in the Qu'Appelle River valley about 70 kilometres (43 mi) north-east of Regina, between Echo and Mission Lakes of the Fishing Lakes. It is not to be confused with the once-significant nearby town of Qu'Appelle. It was originally established in 1864 as a Hudson's Bay Company trading post. Fort Qu'Appelle, with its 1,919 residents in 2006, is at the junction of Highway 35, Highway 10, Highway 22, Highway 56, and Highway 215. The 1897 Hudson's Bay Company store, 1911 Grand Trunk Pacific Railway station, Fort Qu'Appelle Sanatorium (Fort San), and the Treaty 4 Governance Centre in the shape of a teepee are all landmarks of this community. Additionally, the Noel Pinay sculpture of a man praying commemorates a burial ground, is a life-sized statue in a park beside Segwun Avenue.

== Origins and early history ==
The current site is the third Fort Qu'Appelle. The first was a North West Company trading post (1801–05), also in the valley but near what is now the Saskatchewan-Manitoba border. The Hudson's Bay Company itself first used the name for a post north of present-day Whitewood (some 174 km (108 mi) east of Regina on Highway 1) from 1813 to 1819.

Prior to the mid-19th century establishment of the more lengthily surviving fur-trading post at the ultimate site of the town, it "was the hub of several historic trails that traversed the northwest". It was the site of a Hudson's Bay Company post from 1852 to 1854. An Anglican mission was established, which still survives as the town's St. John the Evangelist Anglican parish church.

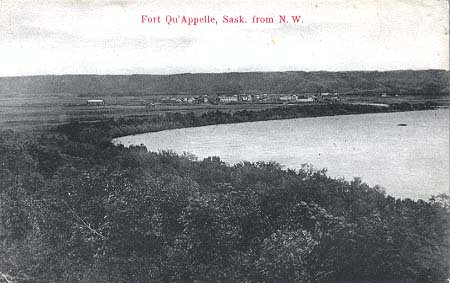
Fort Qu'Appelle from the northwest with the eastern shore of Echo Lake, c. 1905

The post was revived again from 1864 to 1911. With the signing of Treaty 4 by Cree and Saulteaux peoples at Fort Qu'Appelle the North-West Mounted Police, now the Royal Canadian Mounted Police (RCMP), arrived and have maintained a continuous presence in the town ever since.

Substantial transformation of Fort Qu'Appelle occurred when farm development began in the 1880s and farmers required a nearby urban centre for selling their grain and other products, purchasing agricultural and domestic supplies and for social gathering beyond rural schools and churches. It was not anticipated that initial partition of agricultural land into farms of one-quarter section (160 acres [65 ha]) would not last long and farm population would substantially reduce very quickly; the process accelerated in the 1970s when farmers began selling their land and retiring in substantial numbers to Fort Qu'Appelle as the custom of elderly farmers remaining at home with offspring passed into history, and more retired to town.

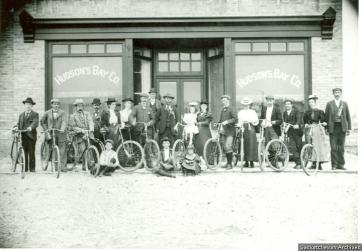
Fort Qu'Appelle cycling club before Hudson's Bay store, 1898

The name "Qu'Appelle" comes from is French for 'who calls' and is derived from its Cree name, kah-tep-was (in Modern Plains Cree: kâ-têpwêt ᑳ ᑌᐻᐟ 'river that calls'). There are several versions of the origin of this name, but the most popular suggests it refers to a Cree legend of two ill-fated lovers." The name refers to the once-popular legend of the Qu'Appelle Valley versified by E. Pauline Johnson and known nation-wide. "Fort Qu'Appelle was the crossroads of a number of historic trails that traversed the North-West Territories."

The town is immediately adjacent to the site of the original Fort Qu'Appelle Hudson's Bay Company trading post, whose "factory" is maintained as a historical site and museum. The Hudson's Bay trading post was built in 1864 when the company's activity was still largely confined to the fur trade with First Nations residents. "[P]emmican was shipped down valley on a Hudson's Bay Company cart trail to supply the paddlers of the fur trade in more forested regions."

Despite the gathering of General Middleton and soldiers at Qu'Appelle, at the westernmost extreme of the still-incomplete Canadian Pacific Railway (CPR) and some kilometres south of the Qu'Appelle Valley, "Middleton empowered Captain French, an Irish officer who had been in the North-West Mounted Police (NWMP), to raise a mounted force in the vicinity of Fort Qu'Appelle. ... This mounted troop ... joined the 10th Royal Grenadiers from Toronto and the Winnipeg Field Battery under the command of artillery officer Lieutenant-Colonel C.E. Montizambert, to form the west-bank column that would march from Qu'Appelle to Batoche", where the battle would occur.

After ethnic European settlement by farmers had become established in the 1880s—a post office being established in 1880—the original Hudson's Bay Company activity was replaced by its department store on Broadway Street in 1897. By this time the fur trade had lapsed but the town community and farmers travelling into town for shopping had substantially increased in number. The store building remains though long disused by the Bay.

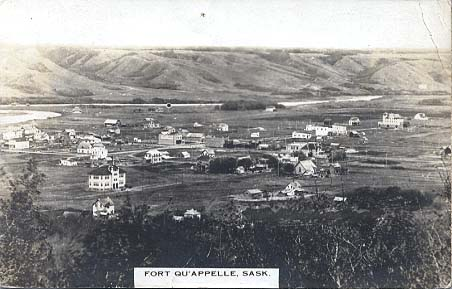
Fort Qu'Appelle, circa 1910

There was once certain ambiguity as to entitlement to the town-name between the present town and the once-significant regional centre bearing the name "Qu'Appelle"; the matter ceased to be an issue in 1911 when the two communities agreed to deem the then-CPR station site as Qu'Appelle and the town in the valley as Fort Qu'Appelle. As did the town of Qu'Appelle, Fort Qu'Appelle early-on had "a bid to succeed Battleford as the territorial capital" but "lost out to Regina ... in 1882".

The name Fort Qu'Appelle was given to a number of trading posts in the Qu'Appelle valley. Near Fort Espérance both the Hudson's Bay Company and the North West Company had temporary posts that were apparently called Fort Qu'Appelle. (The Hudson's Bay Company and the North West Company merged in 1821.) From 1855 until 1864 the Hudson's Bay Company had a Fort Qu'Appelle a little south of where McLean was later established. It was an outpost of Fort Ellice and was mainly a source of pemmican. In 1864 it was moved to the present site of Fort Qu'Appelle.

Three industrial boarding schools for First Nations adolescents were established in 1883, including one on the south side of Mission Lake across from Lebret on the north side of the lake, as well as Battleford and High River.

It was often claimed that colonial administration of Canada, once British North America, was very different from that in other British colonies. But it has been alleged to have been corruption on the part of Edgar Dewdney when he was Lieutenant Governor of the North-West Territories to place the capital in Buffalo Bones rather than Fort Qu'Appelle or Qu'Appelle. On the other hand, Fort Qu'Appelle is strikingly similar to Murree, northeast of Rawalpindi and once the summer capital of British India, and Maymyo, Burma highlands. It was in 1915 that "Sir Robert Borden has been invited by the Saskatchewan Art Society to unveil a memorial at Ft. Qu'Appelle to the signing of the first treaty in 1874 between the Dominion and the plains Indians." The site of the fort was designated a national historic site of Canada in 1953.

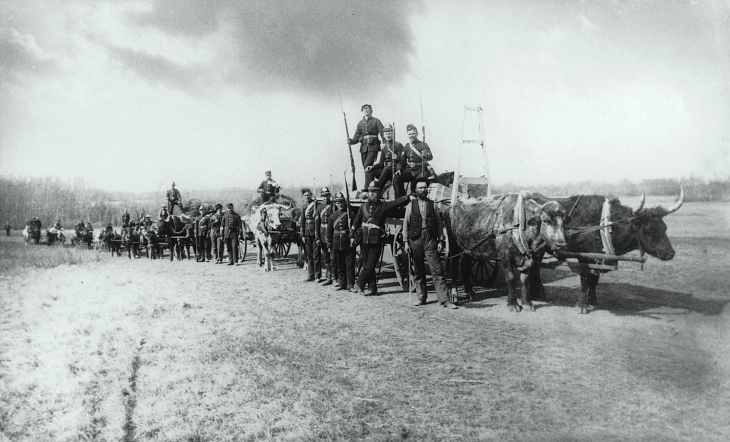
Troops on the march, North-West Rebellion, Qu'Appelle Valley, 1885

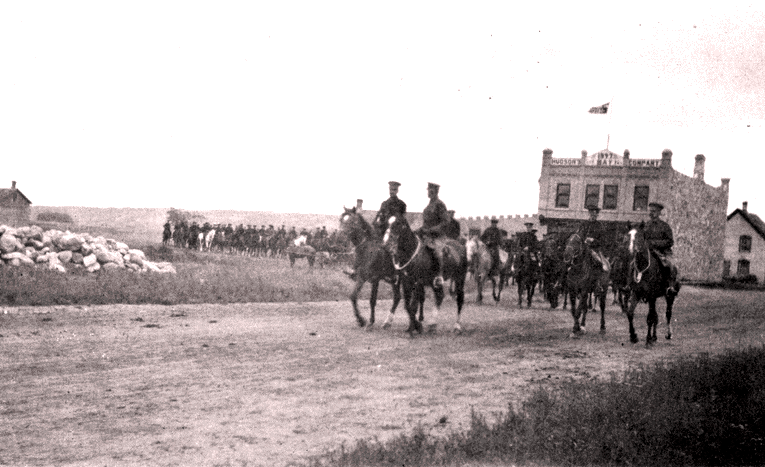
Police parade before Hudson's Bay Company shop, built before the town developed

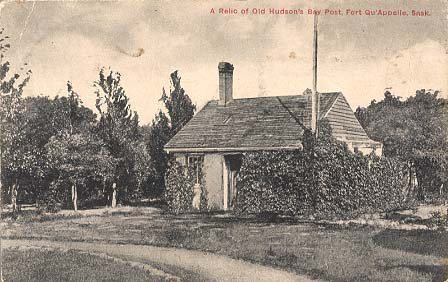
Hudson's Bay post, pre-1914. Today a museum

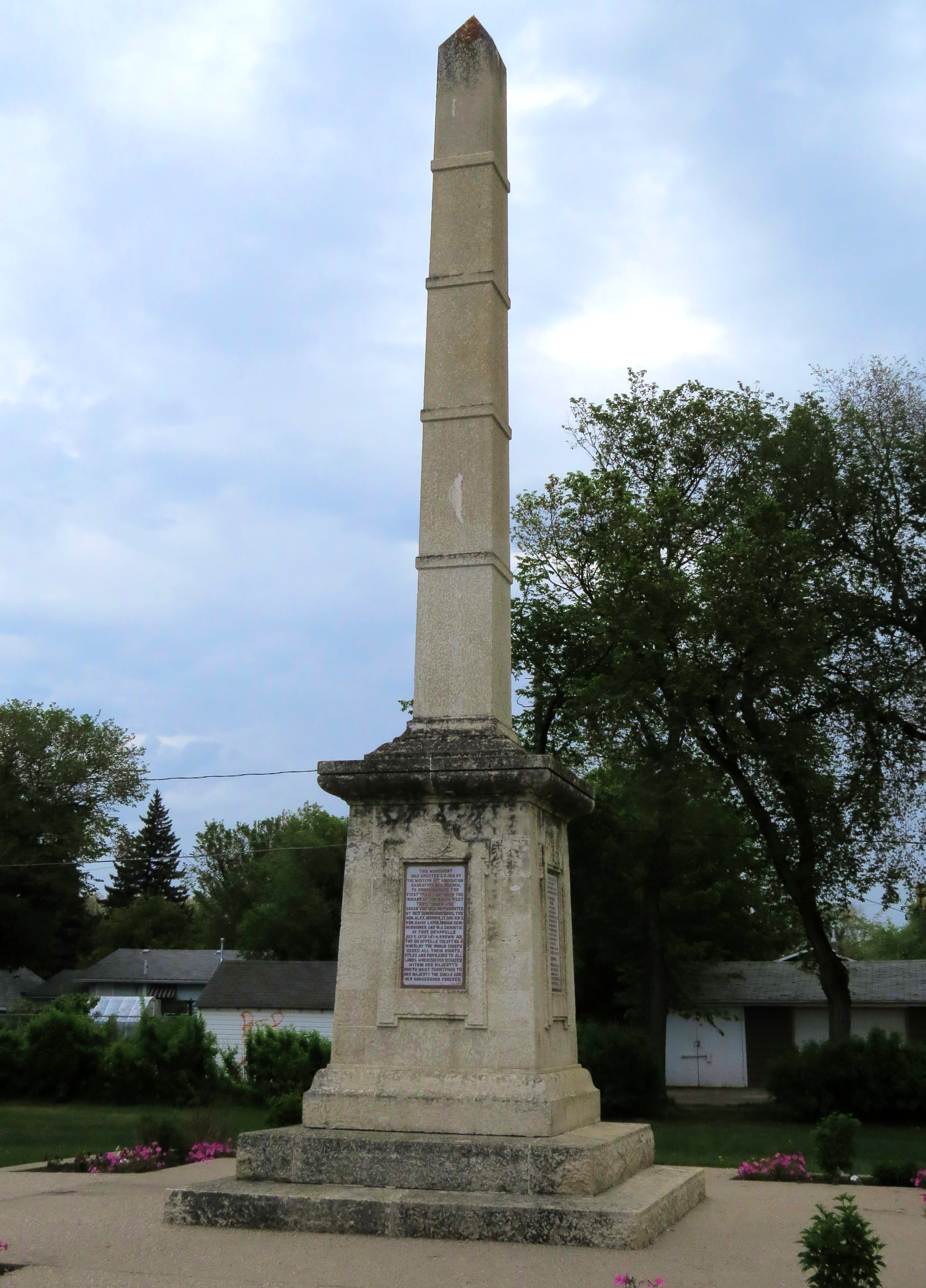
Monument to Treaty 4 signing

== Demographics ==
In the 2021 Census of Population conducted by Statistics Canada, Fort Qu'Appelle had a population of 1,972 living in 850 of its 936 total private dwellings, a change of −3.4% from its 2016 population of 2,042. With a land area of 5.09 km^{2} (1.97 sq mi), it had a population density of 387.4/km^{2} (1,003.4/sq mi) in 2021.

Canada census – Fort Qu'Appelle community profile

	2021	2016	2011
Population	1,972 (-3.4% from 2016)	1,920 (−5.6% from 2011)	2,034 (6.0% from 2006)
Land area	5.09 km^{2} (1.97 sq mi)	2.14 km^{2} (0.83 sq mi)	5.28 km^{2} (2.04 sq mi)
Population density	387.2/km^{2} (1,003/sq mi)	898.9/km^{2} (2,328/sq mi)	385.0/km^{2} (997/sq mi)
Median age	46.8 (M: 44.0, F: 48.4)	44.7 (M: 42.6, F: 46.5)	48.0 (M: 45.2, F: 50.5)
Private dwellings	936 (total) 850 (occupied)	906 (total)	926 (total)
Median household income	$66,500	$N/A	$N/A

References: 2021 2016 2011

== Development ==
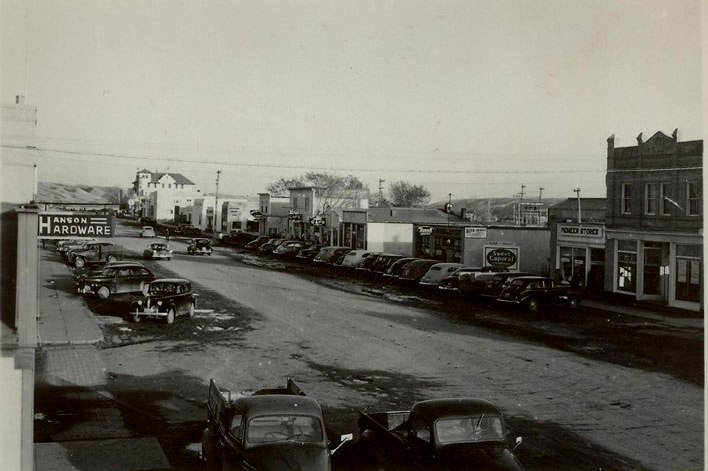
Fort Qu'Appelle Broadway Street circa 1948: Fort Hotel at the far end of the street with the north side of the valley above Mission Lake beyond it

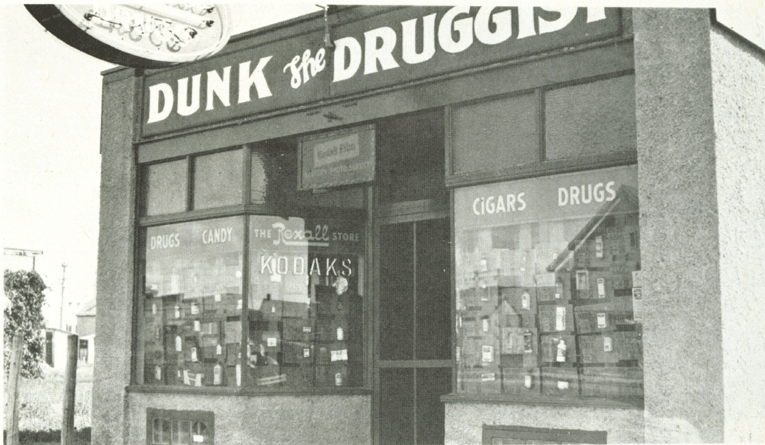
Fort Qu'Appelle drugstore circa World War I

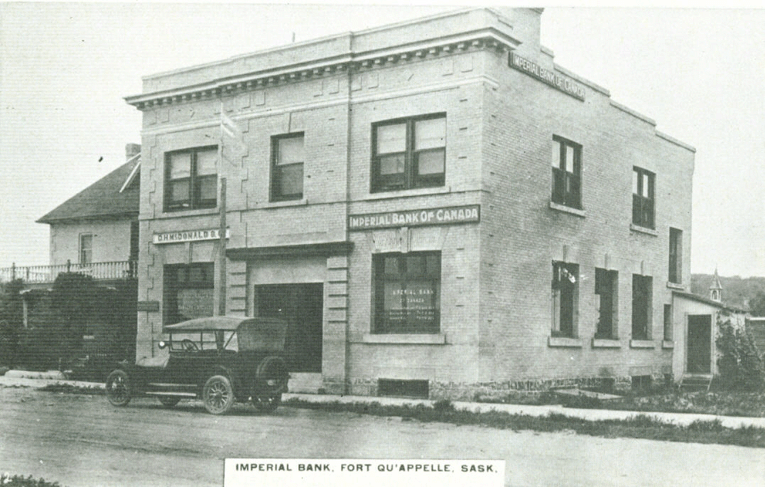
Fort bank circa World War I. Donald H. McDonald, whose name is on the building, was the last Hudson's Bay Company factor until 1911. Presently it serves as the Town of Fort Qu'Appelle Office and Council Chambers.

The town's substantial growth beyond its status as a Hudson's Bay Company "factory" first occurred in the 1880s and 1890s when European settlement began in the region as the Canadian Pacific Railway moved westwards: a post office opened in 1880. This coincided with the first development of British India after the seizing of control of India from the East India Company by The Crown after the 1857 Indian Mutiny, and the town of Fort Qu'Appelle's striking similarity to the Indian hill stations of the early Raj has been widely commented upon by anyone who has seen both. Although the North-West Mounted Police headquarters was established in Regina once it was named capital of the North-West Territories in 1882, the substantial police station at the western end of the town of Fort Qu'Appelle remained significant as centre of service within the valley and in rural communities and to farms in the plains region: this became more important though less as nearby towns declined from the beginning of the Great Depression in 1929 and continuing after World War II.

Older residences and commercial premises together with the town's Anglican and United (formerly Presbyterian) churches are quintessentially of the 19th century hinterland British Empire, a matter which local civic boosters and cultivators of tourism appear not yet to have capitalised upon. "In 1913, construction began on a fish culture station near Fort Qu'Appelle and, to date, the facility has supplied more than 2 billion fish to stock water bodies throughout the province....[T]he Fort Qu'Appelle Sanatorium (Fort San) for tuberculosis patients...[opened in] 1917."

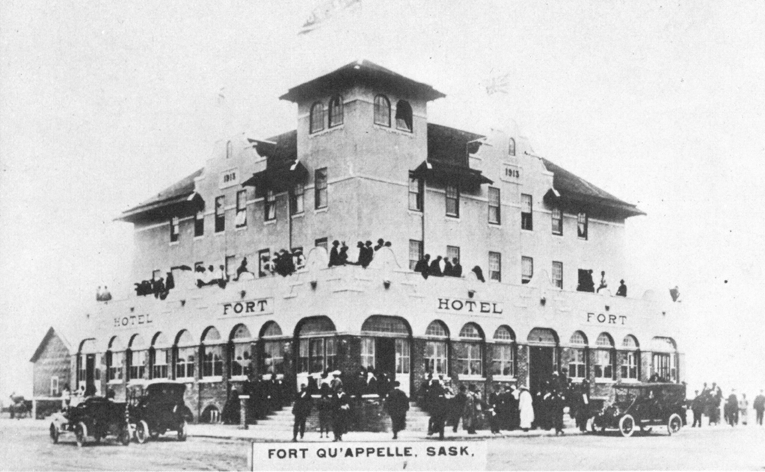
Fort Hotel in the 1920s, destroyed by fire in the 1960s

The commercial shops, being grocery and supply centres for the ample number of area farms, were substantially busier than they would have been if merely for town residents; the Fort Hotel of the early 20th century through the 1960s had a well-attended pub with its parking lot full late Friday afternoons through evenings. A large drive-in movie theatre stood on Bay Avenue south of the railway track just before the entry into the coulee on Highway 36 to leave the valley; it had lively attendance by townspeople, cottagers and farmers until the 1960s when home television significantly improved and the drive-in closed.

Despite the accelerating decline of rural Saskatchewanian population in the post-World War II years as farms needed to be larger and therefore fewer in number for economic viability, the town grew through most of the 1950s and 1960s as a cottage community serving the Qu'Appelle Lakes summer-cottage country in the valley up- and down-river from the town. Cottagers from Regina and other southern Saskatchewan communities used Fort Qu'Appelle as a base from which to explore the scenic and historic river valley, purchase hardware and groceries and contract services; the town also benefited urban drift as farms and other towns steadily depopulated.

This process was precipitately accelerated in the early 1960s. Highway 35 had reached Fort Qu'Appelle by branching off the Trans-Canada Highway at the once-significant town Qu'Appelle and somewhat laboriously proceeding into the Qu'Appelle Valley by winding through an un-occupied coulee. The old highway was supplemented and effectively replaced by Highway 10, leaving the Trans-Canada at Balgonie and taking a straight route from the plain into the valley. This vastly eased access from the southwest and increased Fort Qu'Appelle's attraction over other market-places for farmers.

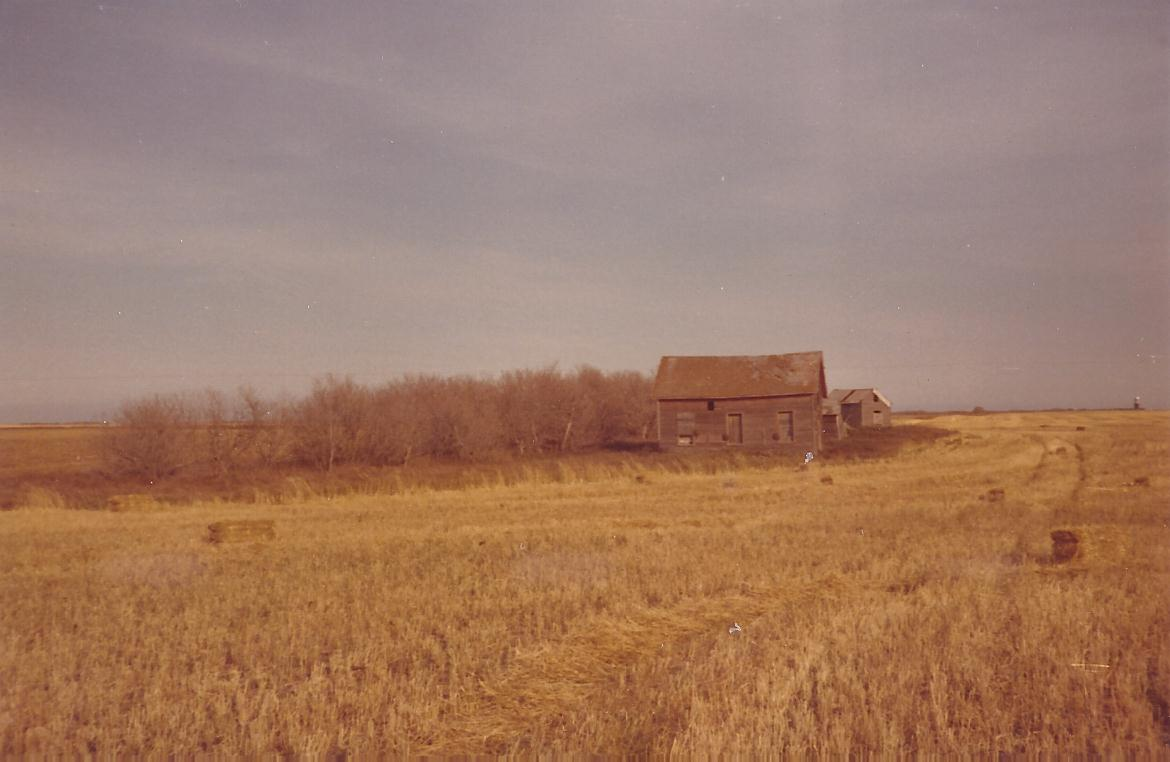
19th-century country school building elsewhere shown while still in use; here photographed in 1970, seven years after closure of successor across the road, from site of teacher's residence: demonstrating steady depopulation of farm neighbourhoods.

In 1963, with steadily decreasing density of farm neighbourhood populations and increasing quality of highways, the rural school districts were abolished and farm primary and high school children—taught in one building with one or two classrooms—were thereafter bused to town schools. Rural churches having largely closed in the 1950s, the collapse of rural farming communities was now assured, to the benefit of minor metro-poles such as Fort Qu'Appelle though arguably to the impoverishment of the community as a whole. With the building of Highway 10 making access to Fort Qu'Appelle from outside the valley easier and faster, the process of farmers using it rather than previously substantial towns such as Qu'Appelle, Edgeley and Balcarres for selling grain and buying groceries further increased its size and vitality. The town itself is today "a shopping, service, and institutional centre serving the surrounding [f]arming community, neighbouring resort villages, cottagers and summer vacationers." Many traditional lake summer cottages have become year-round residences, together with winter skiing further expanding demand for the town's shopping facilities.

== Historic Places ==
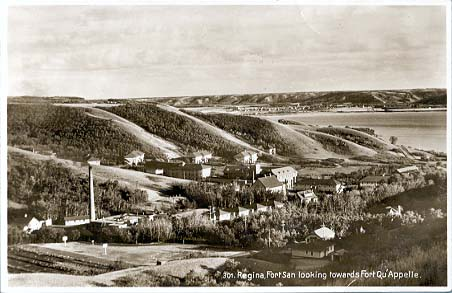
Fort San, 1920s with view of the Fort

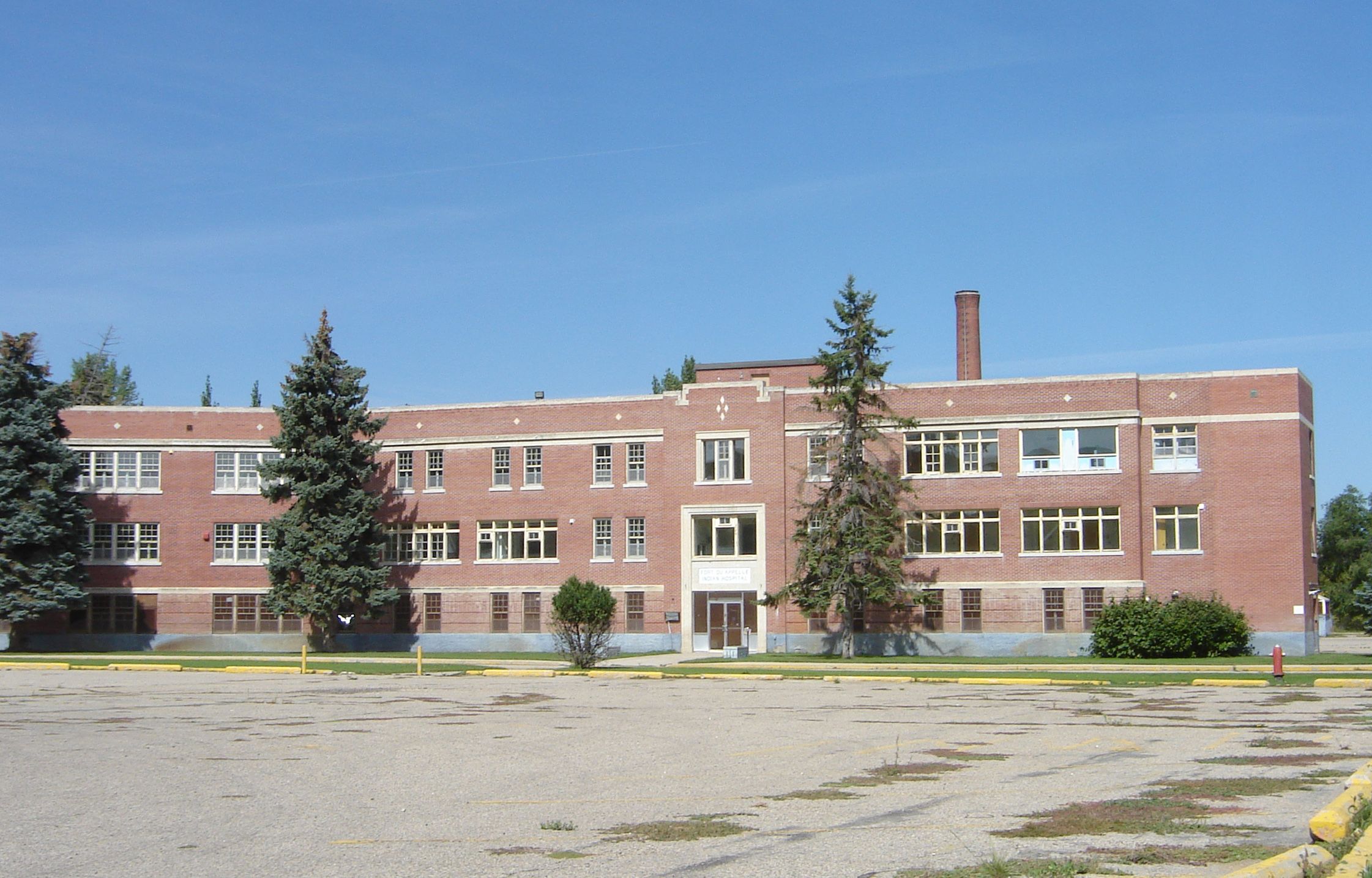
Former Indian Hospital, Fort Qu'Appelle

Maurice Macdonald Seymour, Commissioner of Public Health, was a physician and surgeon of the early North-West Territories in Canada.^{[B]} He founded the Saskatchewan Anti-Tuberculosis League which incorporated and constructed the Fort Qu'Appelle sanitarium. This tuberculosis sanatorium was operated by the provincial department of public health under the direction of R.G. Ferguson and opened in 1917 at nearby Fort San; when tuberculosis ceased to be a public health problem the facility was turned into a fine arts complex where a substantial summer program was operated 1967-91 when the provincial government terminated its funding: latterly it has become a resort village housing the Echo Valley Conference Centre. In addition to the ample summer lake cottages—in later years many occupied throughout the year—and the successive uses of the former Fort San tuberculosis, for many years the Regina YMCA operated a summer camp on the north shore of Echo Lake just west of Fort San; the Anglican Church continues to maintain a similar summer camp on the south shore of Mission Lake the other, east side of the town.

The former Fort Qu'Appelle Indian Hospital was replaced in 2004 by the All Nations Healing Hospital. The hospital is one of the first health care facilities in Canada owned and operated by First Nations governments. There are sixteen in total, five from Touchwood Agency Tribal Council and eleven from File Hills Qu'Appelle Tribal Council. The surrounding area both north and south but also to minor extent within the valley is site of grain and cattle farms, nowadays larger in size and smaller in number and population than in past years, small rural communities and sixteen Indian reserves.

The McDonald House, historically dubbed "The Castle," is a stunning Victorian mansion located in Fort Qu’Appelle, Saskatchewan. Built in 1886 for Archibald McDonald—the last Chief Factor of the Hudson’s Bay Company during the fur trade era—the property serves as an iconic architectural landmark.In May 2026, the home was officially opened to the public as a museum extension

== Education ==
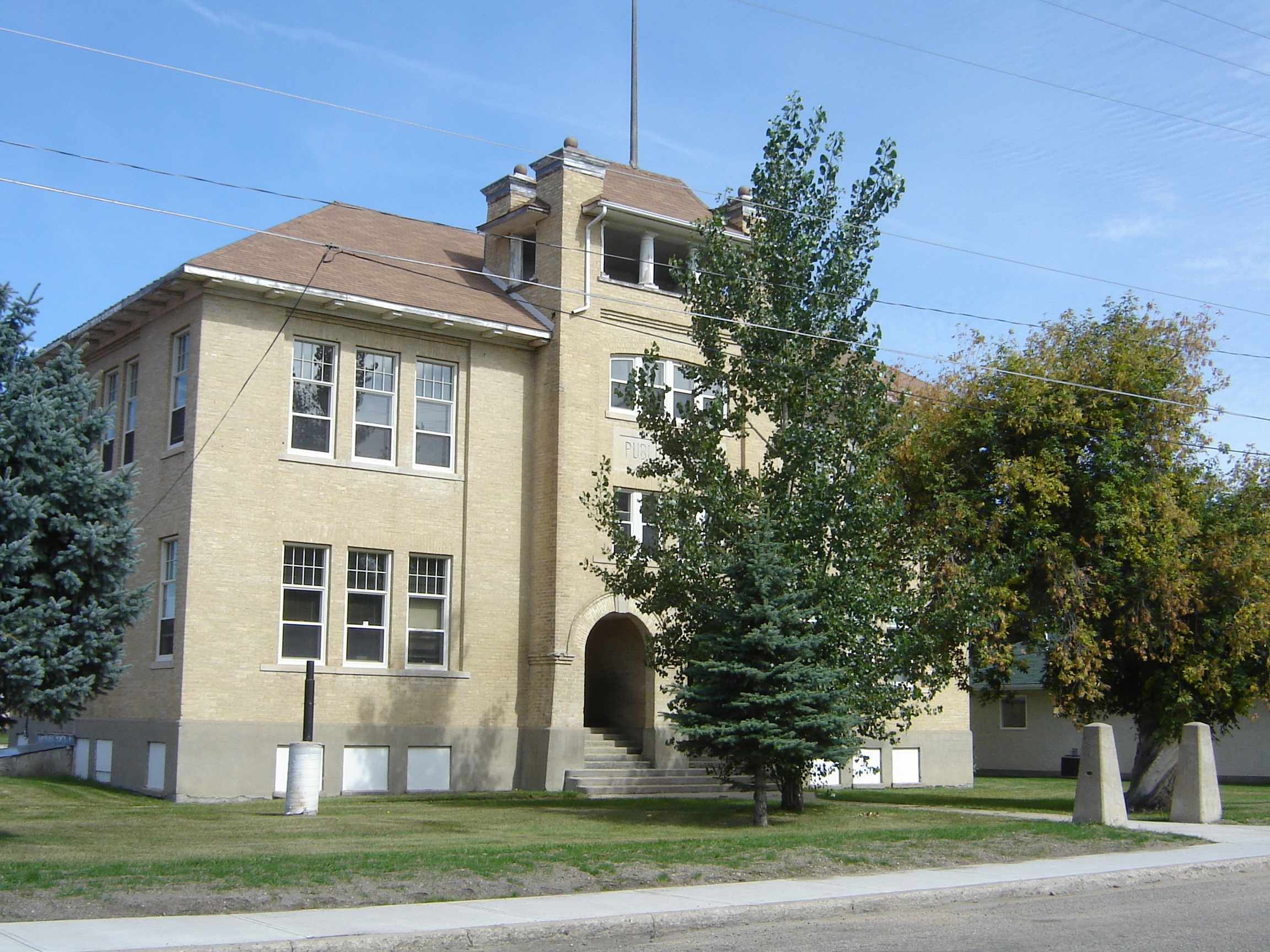
1911 public Central School

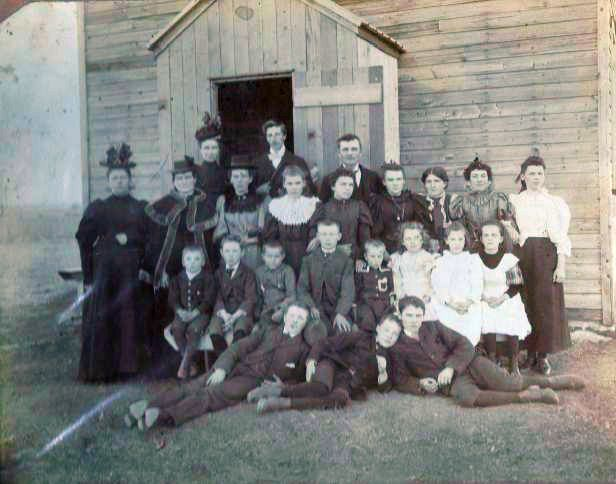
1892 first Springbrook School building (second and no longer-used building) erected in the 20th century, copies of this photo held in the Hudson Bay museum in Fort Qu'Appelle as well as numerous newspaper prints and copies held by former residents of the rural neighbourhood.

The town has one high school, Bert Fox Community High School, and one elementary school, Fort Qu'Appelle Elementary Community School. The former Central School, built in 1911, was converted to the Qu'Appelle Valley Centre for the Arts. Parklands College is located at the Treaty 4 Governance Centre. Schooling in Fort Qu'Appelle radically expanded immediately after the end of academic year 1962-63 when close by rural schools, which had pupils from kindergarten to grade 12, universally closed and their attendees were thereafter driven for school to the Fort. Such element in school pupils and students vastly diminished in subsequent decades, however, as farm population steadily declined.

From 1967 through 1991 the closed tuberculosis sanatorium at Fort San was the location of the Saskatchewan Summer School of the Arts covering dance, music, visual art, writing and theatre. This drew a great many summer visitors to Fort San but also Fort Qu'Appelle and Lebret, whose Sacred Heart Roman Catholic Church was site for liturgical music presentations; the School of the Arts closed due to elimination of provincial government funding.

== Places of worship ==
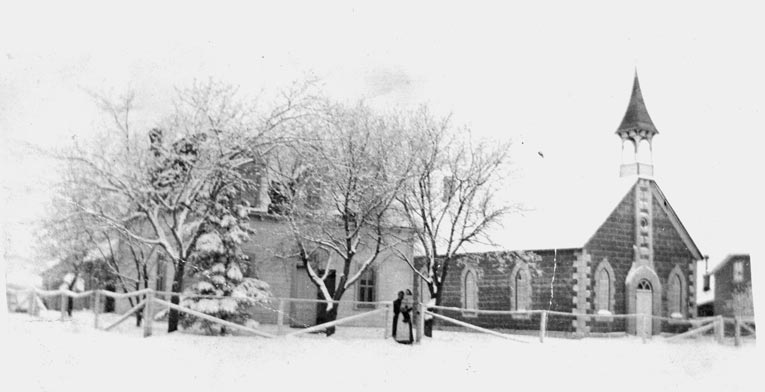
Pre-World War I photo of St Andrew's Presbyterian (United since 1925) Church with next-door manse on Bay Avenue, immediately across side-street from St. John the Evangelist Anglican, also on Bay Avenue.

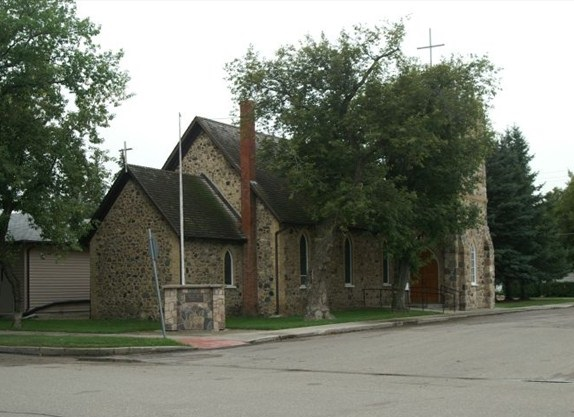
St. John the Evangelist Anglican Church

Churches with long histories by local standards survive in nearby Lebret's Sacred Heart Roman Catholic Church; St. John the Evangelist Anglican, being today's heir of the 1854 Church of England mission (Anglican Camp Knowles on Mission Lake continues to operate in summers); and St. Andrew's United Church (Presbyterian until mid-1925). As in many if not most Canadian communities, church attendance in all traditional denominations has significantly declined, certainly in the Roman Catholic, United, Anglican and Lutheran churches, being the first- through fourth-largest Christian denominations in Canada.

This perhaps especially noticeably affects traditionally dominant denominations among the area's farm communities of Roman Catholic, Presbyterian (cum-United Church in Fort Qu'Appelle albeit not universally in neighbouring Qu'Appelle and Indian Head) and Methodist (universally cum-United in 1925 hereabouts.)

But the historic church buildings are nonetheless supplemented latterly by the more recently constructed Our Lady of Sorrows Roman Catholic Church, Our Saviour Lutheran Church, and the more recently arrived denominations' Valley Alliance Church and Kingdom Hall of Jehovah's Witnesses. Once-thriving rural United Churches survived until the 1950s but closed when farmers' regular access to town increased and more fundamentalist at-home meetings acquired some favour.

== Climate ==
Fort Qu'Appelle has a semi-arid, highland continental climate with dry winters and cool summers (Köppen climate classification BSk), Fort Qu'Appelle's winters can be uncomfortably cold; but warm, dry Chinook winds routinely blow into the city from the Pacific Ocean during the winter months, providing the occasional break from the cold especially during the times of El Niño–Southern Oscillation. These winds have been known to raise the winter temperature by up to 15 °C (27 °F) in just a few hours.

Fort Qu'Appelle is a town of extremes, and temperatures have ranged anywhere from a record low of −47.2 °C (−53.0 °F) in January 1916 to a record high of 44.4 °C (111.9 °F) on 5 July 1937. The closest weather station recording historic climate temperatures is at Qu'Appelle, 27.28 km (16.95 mi) south south-east on Highway 35. According to Environment and Climate Change Canada, the average temperature in Qu'Appelle ranges from a January daily average of −14.2 °C (6.4 °F) to a July daily average of 18.5 °C (65.3 °F).

As a consequence of Fort Qu'Appelle's relative dryness, summer evenings can be very cool, the average summer minimum temperature drops to 10.6 °C (51.1 °F). Fort Qu'Appelle has a semi-arid climate typical of other cities in the Western Great Plains and Canadian Prairies.

Fort Qu'Appelle receives an average of 455.4 mm (17.93 in) of precipitation annually, with 342.5 mm (13.48 in) of that occurring in the form of rain, and the remaining precipitation as 113.0 cm (44.5 in) of snow. Most of the precipitation occurs from May to August, with June and July averaging the most monthly rainfall. Droughts are not uncommon and may occur at any time of the year, lasting sometimes for months or even several years.

Climate data for Fort Qu'Appelle, 1981–2010 normals, extremes 1912–1972 (Note: 1981–2010 normals are from Environment and Climate Change Canada's closest climate station, located at nearby Qu'Appelle. Extreme high and low temperatures were recorded at Fort Qu'Appelle from 1912 to 1972.)
Month	Jan	Feb	Mar	Apr	May	Jun	Jul	Aug	Sep	Oct	Nov	Dec	Year
Record high °C (°F)	11.1 (52.0)	13.3 (55.9)	22.8 (73.0)	33.3 (91.9)	37.8 (100.0)	42.2 (108.0)	44.4 (111.9)	41.1 (106.0)	40.6 (105.1)	32.8 (91.0)	21.7 (71.1)	16.1 (61.0)	44.4 (111.9)
Mean daily maximum °C (°F)	−9.4 (15.1)	−6.7 (19.9)	-0.0 (32.0)	11.0 (51.8)	17.7 (63.9)	21.7 (71.1)	25.0 (77.0)	24.5 (76.1)	18.2 (64.8)	10.1 (50.2)	−0.8 (30.6)	−7.5 (18.5)	8.7 (47.7)
Daily mean °C (°F)	−14.2 (6.4)	−11.4 (11.5)	−4.9 (23.2)	4.6 (40.3)	11.0 (51.8)	15.6 (60.1)	18.5 (65.3)	17.7 (63.9)	11.8 (53.2)	4.5 (40.1)	−5.1 (22.8)	−12.0 (10.4)	3.0 (37.4)
Mean daily minimum °C (°F)	−18.9 (−2.0)	−16.1 (3.0)	−9.8 (14.4)	−1.9 (28.6)	4.3 (39.7)	9.5 (49.1)	12.0 (53.6)	10.9 (51.6)	5.3 (41.5)	−1.2 (29.8)	−9.4 (15.1)	−16.4 (2.5)	−2.7 (27.1)
Record low °C (°F)	−47.2 (−53.0)	−46.7 (−52.1)	−40.6 (−41.1)	−27.8 (−18.0)	−12.8 (9.0)	−4.4 (24.1)	−2.2 (28.0)	−2.8 (27.0)	−13.3 (8.1)	−25.0 (−13.0)	−37.2 (−35.0)	−42.8 (−45.0)	−47.2 (−53.0)
Average precipitation mm (inches)	15.6 (0.61)	11.5 (0.45)	23.1 (0.91)	26.9 (1.06)	60.6 (2.39)	83.2 (3.28)	74.7 (2.94)	57.8 (2.28)	38.2 (1.50)	26.4 (1.04)	18.0 (0.71)	19.5 (0.77)	455.4 (17.93)
Average rainfall mm (inches)	0.5 (0.02)	0.5 (0.02)	3.8 (0.15)	14.8 (0.58)	52.0 (2.05)	82.9 (3.26)	74.7 (2.94)	57.8 (2.28)	35.5 (1.40)	17.5 (0.69)	1.8 (0.07)	0.6 (0.02)	342.5 (13.48)
Average snowfall cm (inches)	15.1 (5.9)	11.0 (4.3)	19.4 (7.6)	12.1 (4.8)	8.6 (3.4)	0.2 (0.1)	0.0 (0.0)	0.0 (0.0)	2.7 (1.1)	8.9 (3.5)	16.2 (6.4)	18.9 (7.4)	113.0 (44.5)
Source: Environment Canada

== Sports ==
The Mission Ridge Ski Hill, located just south of the town near the Treaty 4 Grounds, is open during the winter and is patronised by ski-enthusiasts from the valley and environs and from Regina and elsewhere in the region. On the July long weekend Mission Ridge plays host to Rockin' the Ridge, a one-day country/rock music festival.

Recently, Fort Qu'Appelle and area were host to the 2007 Keystone Cup during 12–15 April. The Keystone Cup is the Junior "B" ice hockey championship and trophy for Western Canada. The home town host, Fort Knox hockey club, placed 2nd and won the silver medal in the event. The town accommodated players, coaches, parents, and fans during the event. "The Fort Qu'Appelle Falcons, a midget-level team made up of 16- and 17-year-olds," finished the 2008–2009 season in first place and without any major infractions. The Fort Qu'Appelle Senior C team brought home the Jack Abbott Memorial Trophy in 1957, 2004 saw the Fort Qu'Appelle Flyers win the Female Pee wee A provincial championship. In 2004 and 2005, the Fort Qu'Appelle Falcons Midge A team earned the Harold Jones Cup, 2006 saw the Female Bantam A team, the Fort Qu'Appelle Flyers rise to provincial championship level, and in 2007 provincial champions arose from Fort Qu'Appelle again when the Falcons Bantam A team achieved the honour of the John Maddia Cup. Starting his career in 1970–71 with the Fort Qu'Appelle Silver Foxes, Glen Burdon was selected in both the National Hockey League and the World Hockey Association drafts. The Fort Qu'Appelle curling club was established 1894. the first rink was north of the Canadian Pacific Railway line on Boundary Avenue North with one sheet of ice. The curling club competed with Lebret and the Sanitorium clubs during the 1940s. The curling club expanded in 1947 moving the Dafoe air force hangar into town. Fort Qu'Appelle Sioux Indians belonged to the Southern Baseball League. In 1961, Duane Ring of the Fort Qu'Appelle Sioux Indians was runner up for the hitting crown. He fell just .057 percentage points behind Lionel Ruhr.

== Recreation, holidaying and tourism ==
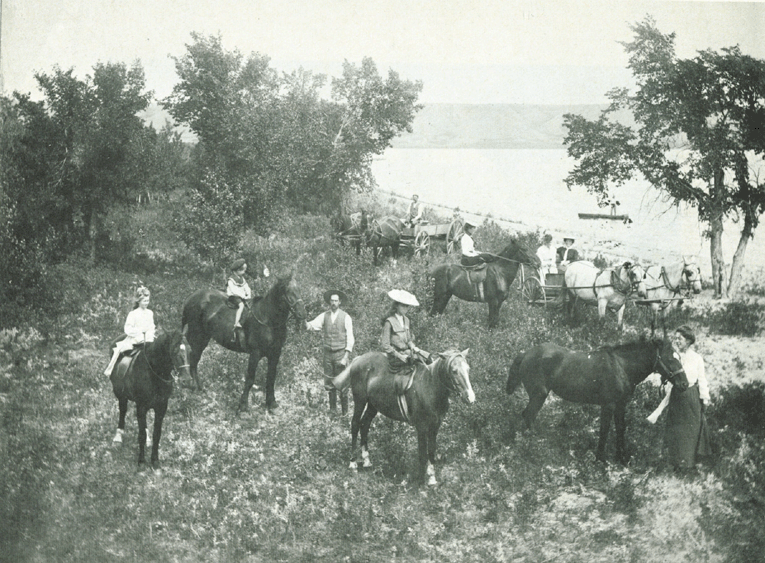
Lakeside horse and wagon riding southeast of the Fort in 1904

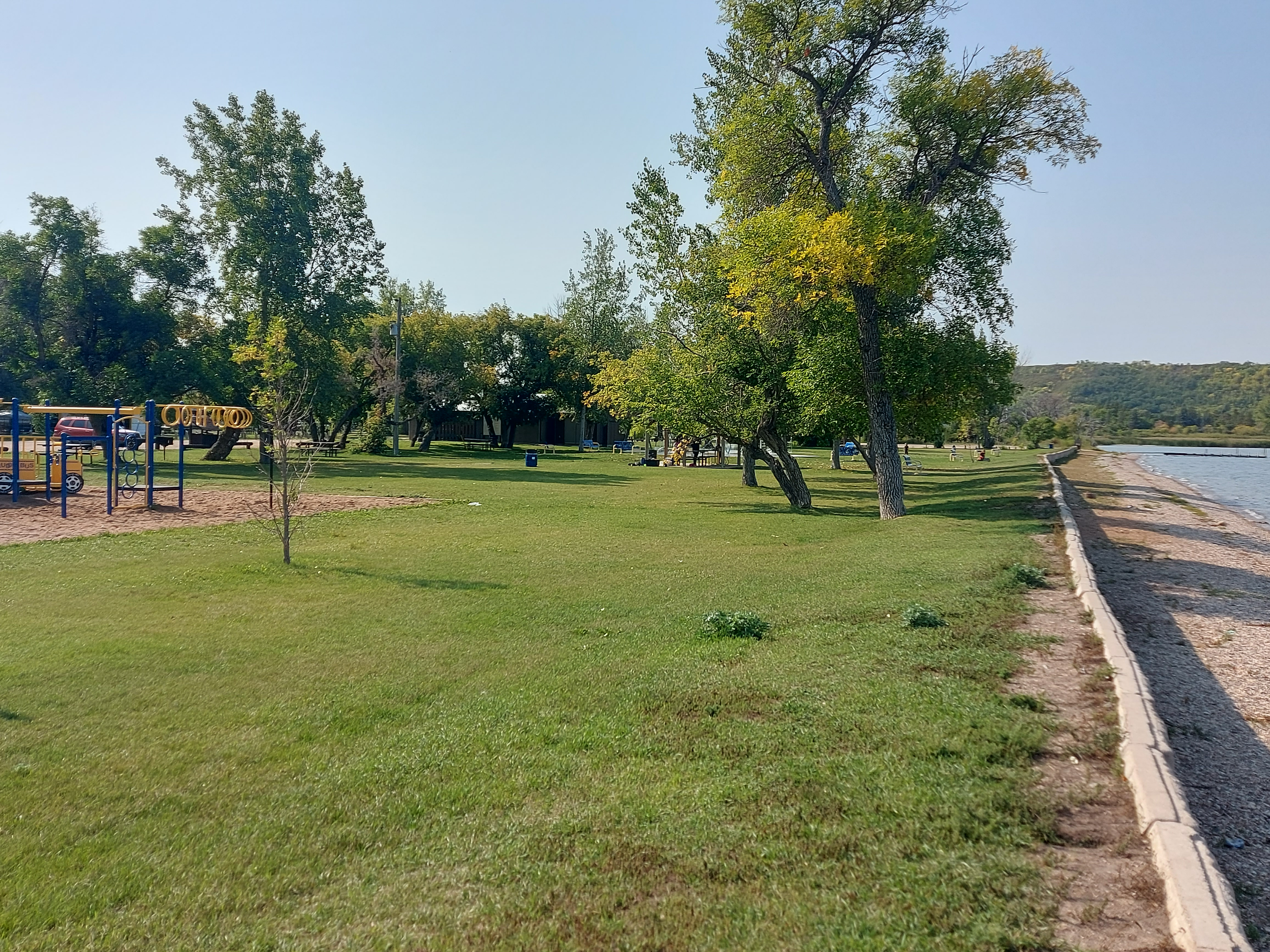
Fort Qu'Appelle Beach on Echo Lake

Fort Qu'Appelle and nearby Qu'Appelle Valley sites have almost from the beginning of township provided ample recreational sites and are a notable tourist destination both in summer and winter. "[I]in the years prior to World War I ...the recreational potential of the district began to be exploited and numerous cottages began to appear on the area lakes." The lakes afford swimming, boating and other water related activities in summer and cross-country skiing, snowmobiling and ice fishing in winter. There is also Echo Valley Provincial Park located between Echo Lake and Pasqua Lake. The park provides an RV park, camping, swimming, boating, and fishing.

"To the visitor, southern Saskatchewan Qu'Appelle Valley might, at first glance, appear to be a mirage. Bordered by seemingly-endless farmland flatness, the dramatic physical features of the valley appear somewhat out of place.

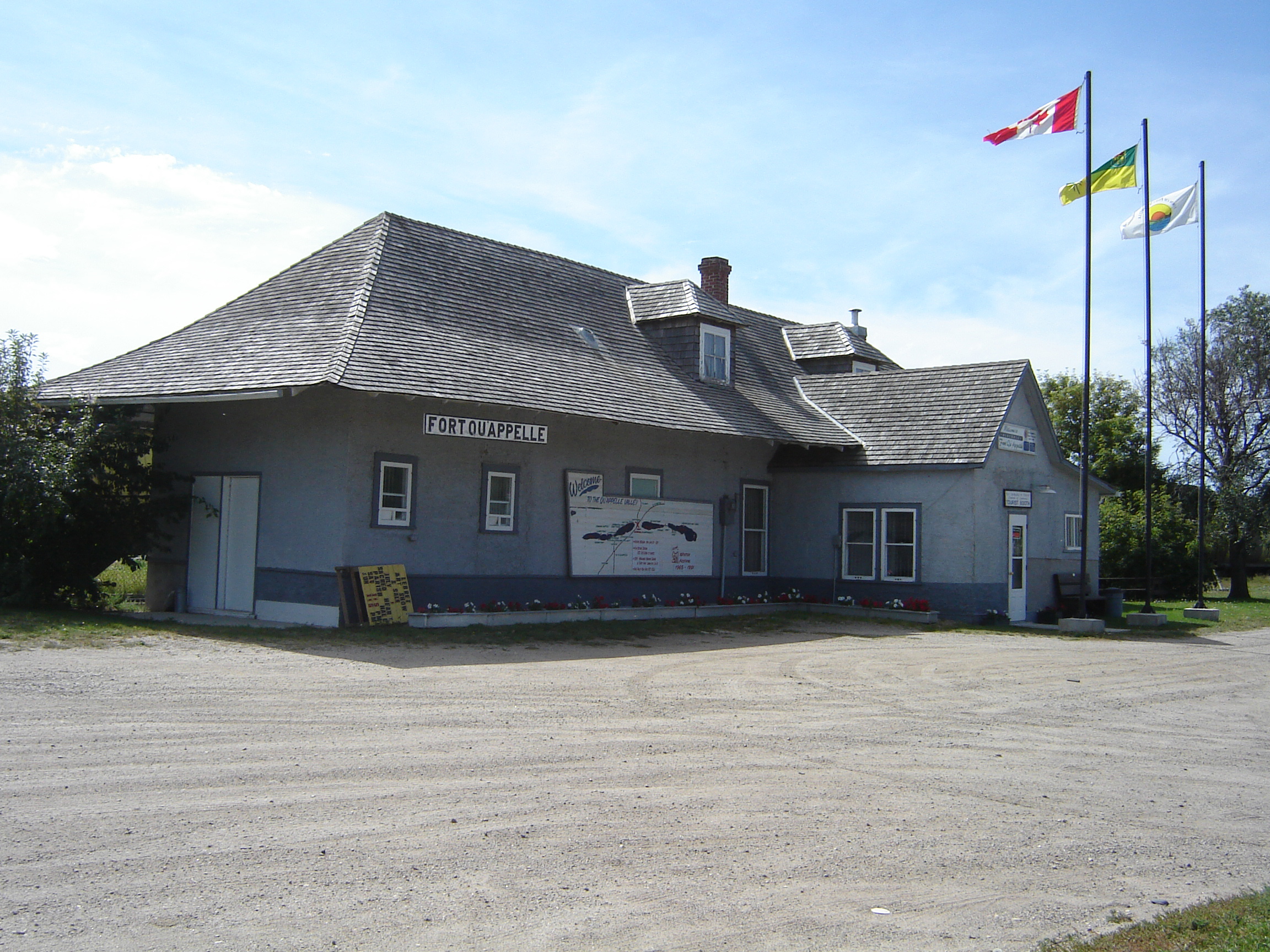
Fort Qu'Appelle station, ceasing use as a station in 1978 but maintained as a visitor site

The long-closed Fort Qu'Appelle station was originally built by the Grand Trunk Pacific Railway, "incorporated in 1903 as a subsidiary of the Grand Trunk Railway" and "[b]y 1923, [with] the Grand Trunk Railway, and the National Transcontinental merged with the Canadian Northern Railway to form the new Canadian National Railway." "[M]any prairie branch lines closed after 1945; the passenger service was terminated in 1978." immediately to the west of Fort Qu'Appelle, approximately halfway along the south shore of the lake; a popular holiday resort and commuter community since the 1880s. The Grand Trunk Pacific Railway station nonetheless continues to stand, maintained as a site for current information on attractions and activities. After closure as a medical facility, Fort San was used as a summer musical facility until the 1990s with choir concerts in the nearby Sacred Heart Roman Catholic Church in Lebret.

The most notable tourist event is Treaty 4 Gathering, a week-long event celebrating the signing of Treaty 4. The event is held in September, during the week of the 15th. Pow wows are held daily during the week.

Aforementioned winter downhill skiing, currently at the Mission Ridge Ski Hill, attracts skiers not only from the town but elsewhere in the region including the city of Regina.

== Notable people ==
- Walter Dieter, the founding chief of the National Indian Brotherhood in 1968, which is today known as the Assembly of First Nations.
- James Henderson, "Saskatchewan's pre-eminent first-generation artist" spent much of his career working in Fort Qu'Appelle.
- Mel "Sudden Death" Hill, National Hockey League forward.
- Hockey star and Hockey Hall of Fame member Eddie Shore was born in Fort Qu'Appelle.
- Noel Starblanket, the third chief of the National Indian Brotherhood.

== Media ==
- The town's weekly community newspaper, the Fort Qu'Appelle Times.
- The town has 3 television re-transmitters. The transmitters are used by CBC (channel 4), Global (channel 6), and CTV (channel 7).

== Television and film location ==
- The movie Skipped Parts, set in Wyoming, had scenes filmed in Fort Qu'Appelle and in nearby towns as well as the city of Regina
- The CBC movie Betrayed was filmed primarily in Fort Qu'Appelle, with notable sites including the old hospital (both in and out).
- The television series Life Without Borders is filmed and produced in the Fort Qu'Appelle area.

== See also ==
- List of towns in Saskatchewan
