= Framework =

A framework is a generic term commonly referring to an essential supporting structure on which other things are built.

Framework may refer to:

== Computing ==
- Application framework, used to implement the structure of an application for an operating system
- Architecture framework
- Content management framework, reusable components of a content management system
- CSS framework
- Enterprise architecture framework
- Framework (office suite), a DOS office application suite in 1984
- Framework Computer, a laptop manufacturer for modular laptops
- Framework-oriented design, uses existing frameworks for application design
- List of rich web application frameworks
- Logical framework
- Multimedia framework, handles media on a computer and through a network
- Software framework, a reusable set of libraries or classes for a software system or subsystem
- Web framework, for development of dynamic websites, web applications, and web services

== Education ==
- Australian Qualifications Framework, the hierarchy of educational qualifications in Australia
- Curriculum framework, a plan, standards or learning outcomes that define content to be learned
- European Qualifications Framework, a hierarchy of educational qualifications in the European Union
- Malaysian Qualifications Framework, the hierarchy of educational qualifications in Malaysia
- National Framework of Qualifications, the hierarchy of educational qualifications in Ireland
- Schools Interoperability Framework, a data sharing specification for academic institutions

== Government and law ==
- Framework agreement
- Framework decision, a legislative act of the European Union
- Legal framework, a form of legal doctrine
- Local development framework, a spatial planning strategy
- Logical framework approach, a management tool used in international development projects
- National Service Framework, policies by the National Health Service of the United Kingdom

== Music ==
- The Framework, Canadian indie-rock band
- Frameworks (band), American post-hardcore band
- Frameworks, 2015 album by Samuel Seo
- "Framework", 2013 song by The Story So Far from What You Don't See

== Other uses ==
- Conceptual framework, a set of theories that serve as the guiding principles of research
- Cultural framework, traditions, value systems, myths, and symbols that are common in a society
- Framework (building), a proposed building in Portland, Oregon
- Framework interpretation (Genesis), an interpretation of the first chapter of Genesis
- Framework region, a region in the variable domain of a protein
- Media engagement framework, a construct to understand social media marketing-based audiences

== See also ==
- Frame (disambiguation)
- Framing (disambiguation)
- Framework convention (disambiguation)
- Framework Directive (disambiguation)
