= Framing =

Framing may refer to:

- Framing (construction), common carpentry work
- Framing (law), providing false evidence or testimony to prove someone guilty of a crime
- Framing (social sciences)
- Framing (visual arts), a technique used to bring the focus to the subject
- Framing (World Wide Web), a technique using multiple panes within a web page
- Pitch framing, a baseball concept
- Timber framing, a traditional method of building with heavy timbers

== See also ==
- Frame synchronization, in telecommunications
- Frame of reference, a coordinate system
- Frame (disambiguation)
- Framed (disambiguation)
- Framing device, a narrative tool
- Framework (disambiguation)
- Inertial frame of reference, describes time and space homogeneously, isotropically, independent of time
- Picture frame
- Verb framing, in linguistics
