= Margaret Frame =

Canadian painter

- Born: 1903; Oxford, Nova Scotia, Canada
- Died: December 18, 1985 (aged 81–82); Nepean, Ontario, Canada
- Known for: Painter
- Spouse: Hazlitt Seymour Beatty (m. 1943)

Margaret Frame (1903 – 1985) was a Canadian painter known for her portraiture.

== Biography ==
Margaret Frame was born in 1903 in Oxford, Nova Scotia. In 1906, her family moved to Regina, Saskatchewan, and there she studied with Inglis Sheldon-Williams and James Henderson.

Continuing her education, from 1922 to 1924 Frame was in Boston where she studied at the Museum of Fine Arts. There she was encouraged by John Singer Sargent and Philip Leslie Hale. Frame then studied at the Ecole des Beaux-Arts in Paris for four years.

In 1922, Frame's was included in the 44th exhibition of the Royal Canadian Academy of Arts in Montreal. In 1925 she exhibited two portraits at the British Empire Exhibition in London. In 1926, Frame had her first solo exhibition at the Galérie de Marsan in Paris. In 1932, her portraits were included at the Salon of Women Painters and Sculptors of France.

In 1943, Frame married Squadron Leader Hazlitt Seymour Beatty, R.A.F.

She returned to Canada and opened a studio in Ottawa during World War II.

Among Frame's subjects were George V, William Stevens Fielding, and Michael I of Romania. In 1954, she painted a portrait of Margaret McCurdy who served as the "first lady" of Nova Scotia from 1947 to 1952.

Frame died on December 18, 1985, in Nepean, Ontario.
