= X-frame =

X-Frame may also refer to:

- X-cross (BDSM), a restraint device
- A type of vehicle frame
- a Smith & Wesson revolver frame size

== See also ==
- Frame (disambiguation)
- XFrames, an XML format for combining and organizing web pages
