= Framework convention =

Framework convention may refer to:

- Framework Convention Alliance for Tobacco Control, in the United States
- Framework Convention for the Protection of National Minorities, by the Council of Europe
- Framework Convention for the Protection of the Marine Environment of the Caspian Sea
- Framework Convention on the Protection and Sustainable Development of the Carpathians
- Kyoto Protocol to the United Nations Framework Convention on Climate Change
- United Nations Framework Convention on Climate Change
- World Health Organization Framework Convention on Tobacco Control

== See also ==
- Framework (disambiguation)
