= Fort Qu'Appelle station =

Railway station in Fort Qu'Appelle, Canada

Coordinates: 50.7639°N 103.7946°W

Fort Qu'Appelle
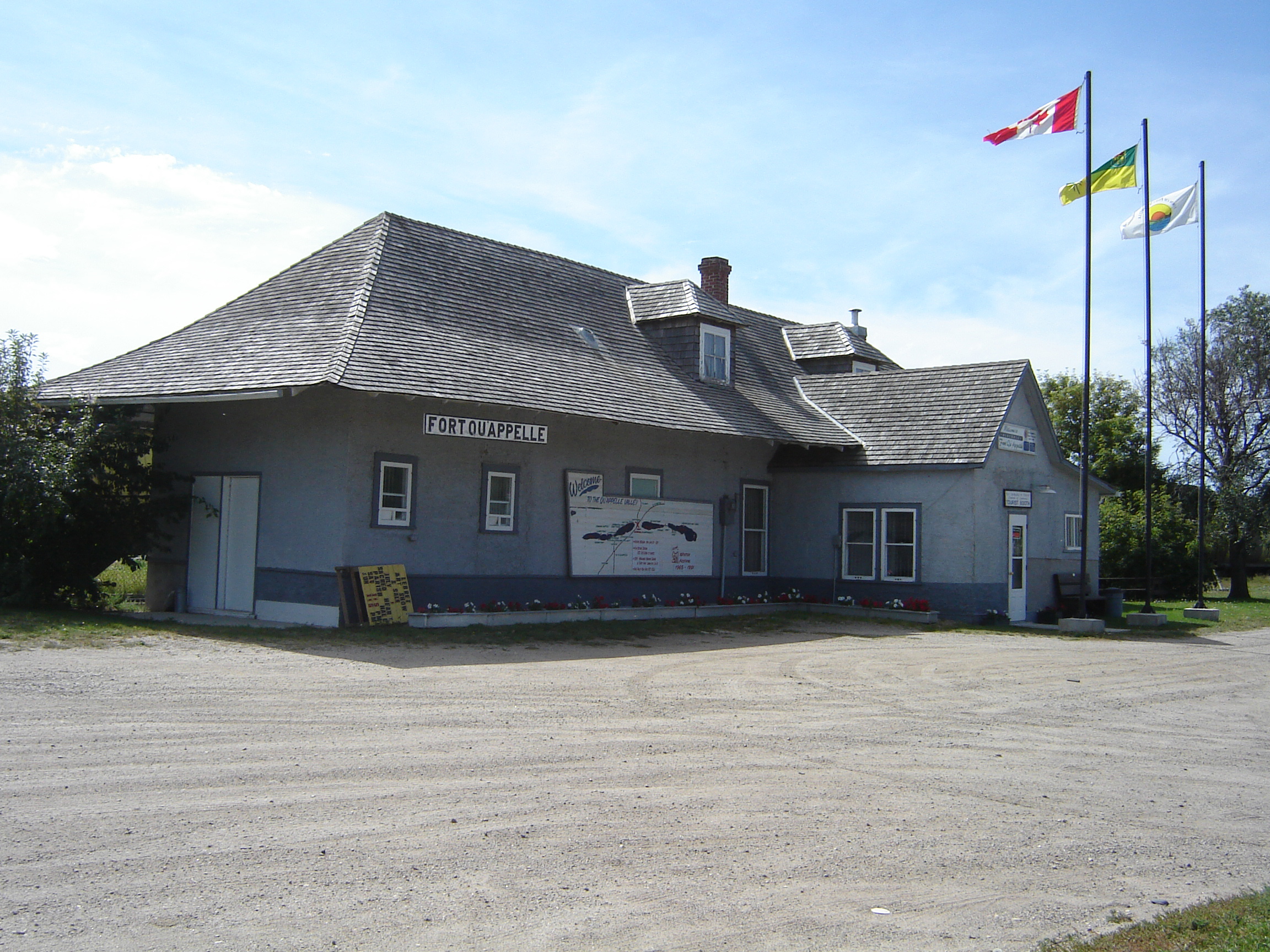
- Former Fort Qu'Appelle station, circa 2008

General information
- Location: Highway 10; Fort Qu'Appelle, Saskatchewan
- Lines: Canadian National Railway (Grand Trunk Pacific Railway)
- Platforms: 1

History
- Opened: 1911
- Closed: 1962

Former services
| Preceding station | Canadian National Railway | Following station |
|---|---|---|
| Muscow toward Regina | Regina – Hudson Bay Junction | Lebret toward Hudson Bay Junction |
Location

The Fort Qu'Appelle station is a former railway station in Fort Qu'Appelle, Saskatchewan. It was built by the Grand Trunk Pacific Railway in 1911 and was taken over by the Canadian National Railway in 1919; it continued to operate passenger service until 1962. The 1 1/2-story wood-frame, stucco-clad building is a designated municipal heritage building. It is now used as a tourist information centre.
