= Frame, West Virginia =

Unincorporated community in West Virginia, United States

- Unincorporated community
- Location within West Virginia and the United States Frame (the United States)
- Coordinates: 38°30′15″N 81°28′33″W
- Country: United States
- State: West Virginia
- County: Kanawha
- Elevation: 686 ft (209 m)
- Time zone: UTC-5 (Eastern (EST))
  - Summer (DST): UTC-4 (EDT)
- GNIS ID: 1539214

Frame is an unincorporated community in Kanawha County, West Virginia, United States.

The community was named after a local blacksmith with the surname Frame.
