= John Frame =

John Frame may refer to:

- John Frame (theologian) (born 1939), American philosopher and Calvinist theologian
- John Frame (cricketer) (1733–1796), English cricketer
- John Frame (sculptor) (born 1950), American sculptor, photographer, composer and filmmaker
- John Frame (bishop) (1930–2017), Canadian bishop
- John W. Frame (1872–1932), provincial politician from Alberta, Canada
- John Frame (rugby union) (born 1946), Scottish rugby union player
