= Framed (American TV program) =

- Country of origin: United States
- Original language: English

Original release
- Release: December 14, 2007 – present

Framed is an American variety television series that airs on the IFC network. The show began in December 2007 and features athletes being interviewed by music and film stars. Shoemaker Reebok is producing the series in partnership with the IFC network and all the athletes featured have endorsed Reebok products. Other partners involved in the series are Carat Entertainment and Roadside Entertainment.
