= James Henderson (artist) =

Scottish-Canadian artist (1871–1951)

James Henderson (1871–1951) from Glasgow, Scotland "is considered to be one of Saskatchewan's pre-eminent first generation artists." Henderson is the subject of a significant retrospective exhibition organized by and first exhibited at the Mendel Art Gallery in 2009. A website dedicated to his life and work has been produced in conjunction with the exhibition,

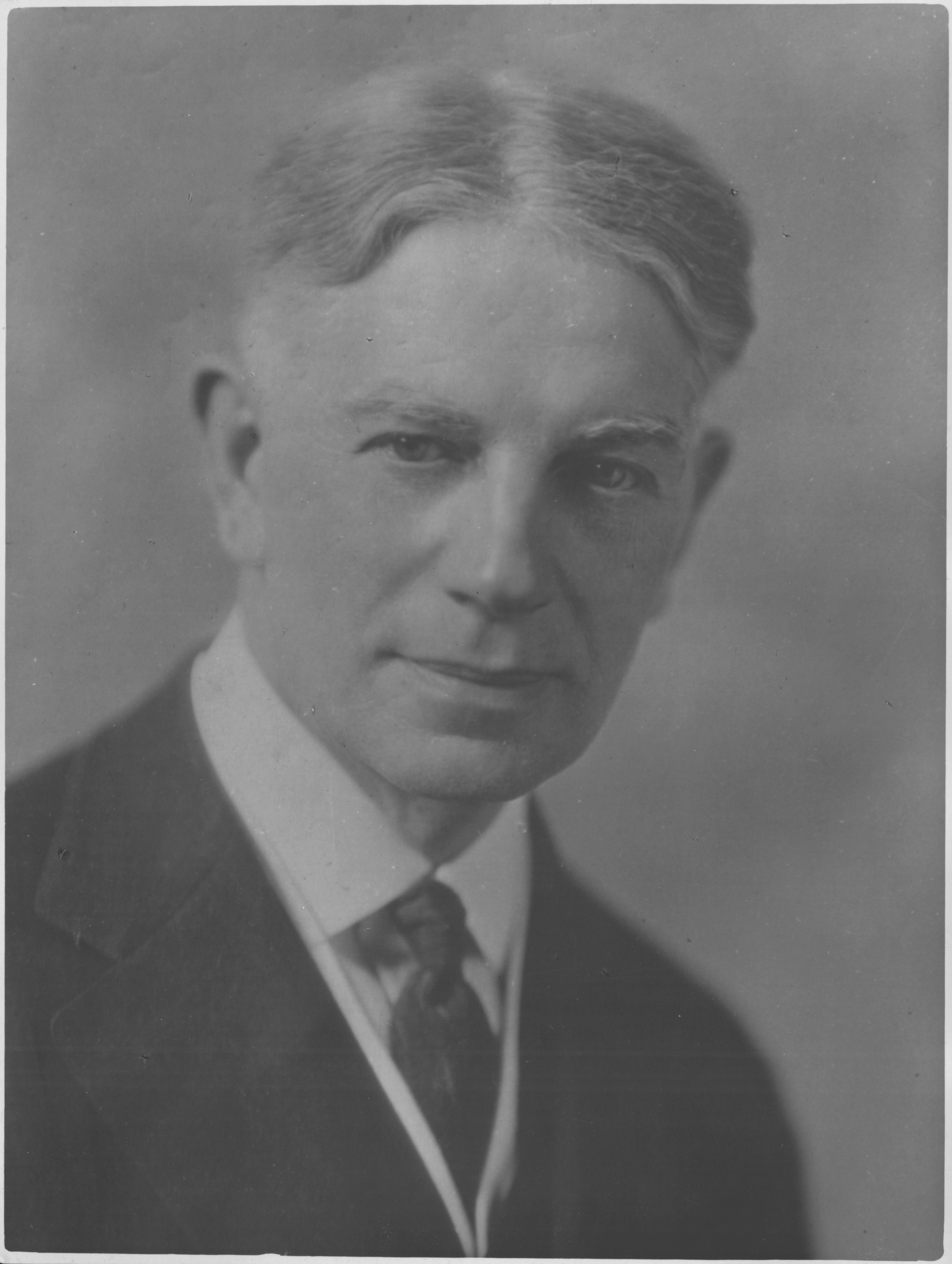
Image of James Henderson

James Henderson, also known as Wicite Owapi Wicasa (meaning "Man Who Paints the Old Men"), was a prominent Scottish-born Canadian painter best known for his depictions of Indigenous people and the prairies of Western Canada. His life story is both a journey of artistic development and a testament to his deep relationship with the Indigenous cultures of Canada.

== Early Life and Background ==
James Henderson was born in Glasgow, Scotland, on August 31, 1871. He trained in fine arts at the prestigious Glasgow School of Art. Henderson developed a strong foundation in landscape painting and portraiture, skills that would later shape his life's work. He emigrated to Canada in 1909, seeking new opportunities as an artist.

== Move to Canada and Early Career ==
Upon arriving in Canada, Henderson initially settled in Winnipeg, Manitoba, and worked as a commercial artist. However, his passion for the natural beauty of the prairies and the cultures of Indigenous people soon drew him westward to Fort Qu'Appelle, Saskatchewan. It was here, in the Qu'Appelle Valley, that he found his creative muse and where his legacy as an artist would be cemented.

== Relationship with Indigenous Communities ==
Henderson became deeply involved with the local Cree and Saulteaux (Ojibwe) people. His respectful relationship with these communities earned him the honorific name Wicite Owapi Wicasa, recognizing his talent for capturing the elders and traditional scenes in his paintings. Rather than romanticize or stereotype his subjects, Henderson sought to paint Indigenous people with dignity and authenticity, often portraying them in ceremonial clothing or engaged in traditional activities. His works are noted for their attention to detail and their sensitive portrayal of Indigenous culture during a time when such depictions were rare and often misrepresented.

== Artistic Legacy and Style ==
Henderson's artistic style was a blend of Realism and Impressionism, with a focus on vibrant colors, light, and texture. His landscapes of the Saskatchewan prairies were majestic, capturing the vastness and beauty of the land. His portraits, meanwhile, offered a rare and respectful window into Indigenous life. He exhibited widely in Canada, including at the National Gallery of Canada, and his work was praised for its ability to document a rapidly changing world.

== Contribution to Canadian Art ==
James Henderson is considered one of the most significant artists of the Canadian Prairies, not just for his technical skill but for the historical and cultural significance of his work. His portraits of Indigenous peoples and their customs serve as an important record of the era, offering insight into the lives of Indigenous people at a time when their ways of life were under threat from the encroachment of European settlers and government policies like residential schools.

Henderson's dedication to his craft and his subjects helped him build relationships with many Indigenous leaders, and he was seen as a bridge between Indigenous cultures and the European settler society.

== Later life and death ==
In his later years, Henderson continued to paint, creating a prolific body of work that is still admired today. He died in 1951.

== Legacy ==
Today, Henderson's paintings are housed in galleries across Canada, including the MacKenzie Art Gallery in Regina and the National Gallery of Canada. His work remains an essential part of Canadian art history, celebrated for its authenticity and the respect it showed towards the people and the land of the Prairies.
