= Historical Museum =

A historical museum is a museum which specialises in history.

Historical Museum may refer to:

== Unqualified name ==
- Historical Museum, Frankfurt, Germany
- Historical Museum Bamberg, Germany
- Historical Museum of Aruba
- Historical Museum of Bosnia and Herzegovina, Sarajevo
- Historical Museum of Crete, Heraklion, Greece
- Historical Museum of the City of Gdańsk, Poland
- Historical Museum of Ioannina, Greece
- Historical Museum of Kraków, Poland
- National Museum of the Marine Corps, USA
- Historical Museum of the Mexican Revolution, Chihuahua, Mexico
- The Historical Museum of Northern Jutland, Denmark
- Historical Museum of the Palatinate, Speyer, Germany
- Historical Museum of the Saru River, Japan
- The Historical Museum of St. James – Assiniboia, Winnipeg, Canada
- Historical Museum of Serbia, Belgrade
- Historical Museum of Sughd, Tajikistan

== Qualified name ==
=== Australia ===
- Castlemaine Art Museum, Victoria
- Dromana Historical Museum, Victoria
- Hastings Historical Society Museum, New South Wales
- James Cook Historical Museum, Queensland
- Lobethal Archives and Historical Museum, South Australia
- North Stradbroke Island Historical Museum, Queensland
- Queenscliffe Historical Museum, Victoria

=== Bulgaria ===
- Pleven Regional Historical Museum
- Plovdiv Regional Historical Museum
- Rousse Regional Historical Museum

=== Canada ===
- Broadview Historical Museum, Saskatchewan
- Jordan Historical Museum of the Twenty, Ontario
- Prince Albert Historical Museum, Saskatchewan
- Saint John Jewish Historical Museum, New Brunswick
- Thunder Bay Historical Museum, Ontario

=== Germany ===
- Deutsches Historisches Museum, Berlin
- Dresden Historical Museum
- Museum for Historical Maybach Vehicles, Bavaria

=== Japan ===
- Asuka Historical Museum
- Ebetsu City Historical Museum
- Eniwa City Historical Museum
- Esashi Town Historical Museum
- Kubote Historical Museum
- Kyushu Historical Museum
- Matsumae Town Historical Museum
- Matsura Historical Museum
- Mogami Yoshiaki Historical Museum
- Ōita City Historical Museum
- Satake Historical Museum
- Tottori City Historical Museum
- Uwajima City Historical Museum

=== Russia ===
- Military Historical Museum of Artillery, Engineers and Signal Corps, Saint Petersburg
- State Historical Museum, Moscow
- Volodymyr-Volynsky Historical Museum

=== United States ===
- Amberg Historical Museum Complex, Wisconsin
- American Swedish Historical Museum, Pennsylvania
- Archer Historical Society Museum, Florida
- Arlington Historical Museum, Virginia
- Atchison County Historical Museum, Kansas
- Atlantic City Historical Museum, New Jersey
- Bardstown Historical Museum, Kentucky
- Buffalo Fire Historical Museum, New York
- Campbell Historical Museum, California
- Cedar Key Historical Museum, Florida
- Chapman Historical Museum, New York
- Chisholm Trail Historical Museum, Oklahoma
- Clark County Historical Museum, Washington
- Clarke Historical Museum, California
- Clay County Historical Museum, Florida
- Clay County Historical Society Museum, Missouri
- Cloud County Historical Museum, Kansas
- Deschutes Historical Museum, Oregon
- Delaware County Historical Museum Complex, Iowa
- Detroit Historical Museum, Michigan
- DuPage County Historical Museum, Illinois
- Edmonds Historical Museum, Washington
- Flagler Beach Historical Museum, Florida
- Greensboro Historical Museum, North Carolina
- Halifax Historical Museum, Florida
- Hancock Historical Museum, Ohio
- Harrison County Historical Museum, Texas
- Harvey County Historical Museum, Kansas
- Hawthorne Historical Museum and Cultural Center, Florida
- Hoboken Historical Museum, New Jersey
- Indian Rocks Beach Historical Museum, Florida
- IXL Historical Museum, Michigan
- J. M. Davis Arms and Historical Museum, Oklahoma
- J. Millard Tawes Historical Museum, Maryland
- Jeffersontown Historical Museum, Kentucky
- Joliet Area Historical Museum, Illinois
- Kaleva Historical Museum, Michigan
- Kings Mountain Historical Museum, North Carolina
- Lady Lake Historical Society Museum, Florida
- Lake City-Columbia County Historical Museum, Florida
- Lake Worth Historical Museum, Florida
- Lamar County Historical Museum, Texas
- Lexington Historical Museum, Missouri
- Los Alamos Historical Museum, California
- Maitland Historical Museum, Florida
- Marathon County Historical Museum, Wisconsin
- Meigs County Historical Museum, Tennessee
- Mesa Historical Museum, Arizona
- Middleborough Historical Museum, Massachusetts
- Mitchell Depot Historical Museum, Georgia
- Marco Island Historical Museum, Florida
- Modoc County Historical Museum, California
- Monson Historical Society Museum, Maine
- Montrose County Historical Museum, Colorado
- Motley County Historical Museum, Texas
- Motown Historical Museum, Michigan
- North Brevard Historical Museum, Florida
- Panhandle–Plains Historical Museum, Texas
- Pantego Academy Historical Museum, North Carolina
- Peabody Historical Library Museum, Kansas
- Pine Grove Historical Museum, Michigan
- Plymouth County Historical Museum, Iowa
- Polk County Historical Museum (disambiguation)
- Portuguese Historical Museum, California
- Quilcene Historical Museum, Washington
- Rusk County Historical Society Museum, Wisconsin
- San Jose Historical Museum, California
- Sandy Ground Historical Museum. New York
- Santa Barbara Historical Museum, California
- Sheboygan County Historical Museum, Wisconsin
- Sitka Historical Museum, Alaska
- Souders Historical Museum, Kansas
- Southampton Historical Museum, New York
- Washington-Wilkes Historical Museum, Georgia
- West Franklin Historical Museum, Illinois
- Wichita-Sedgwick County Historical Museum, Kansas
- Winter Park Historical Museum, Florida
- Wisconsin Historical Museum
- Worcester Historical Museum, Massachusetts

=== Elsewhere ===
- Aalborg Historical Museum, Denmark
- Basel Historical Museum, Switzerland
- Bern Historical Museum, Switzerland
- Historical and Folklore Museum of Corinth, Greece
- Historical-ethnographic museum of Khinalug village, Azerbaijan
- Jewish Historical Museum (disambiguation)
- Kutaisi State Historical Museum, Georgia
- The Plains Vintage Railway & Historical Museum, New Zealand
- Tacna Historical Museum, Peru
- Tamsui Historical Museum, Taiwan
- Vatican Historical Museum, Vatican City
- Vendsyssel Historical Museum, Denmark

== See also ==
- Historic house museum, a general concept
- National Historical Museum, a general concept and several named museums
- Natural History Museum, London
