= List of museums in Saskatchewan =

This list of museums in Saskatchewan contains museums which are defined for this context as institutions (including nonprofit organizations, government entities, and private businesses) that collect and care for objects of cultural, artistic, scientific, or historical interest and make their collections or related exhibits available for public viewing in Saskatchewan. Also included are non-profit art galleries and university art galleries. Museums that exist only in cyberspace (i.e., virtual museums) are not included.

== Museums ==
Name	Town/City	Region	Type	Summary
Abernethy Nature-Heritage Museum	Abernethy	Southeast	Multiple	Area cultural and natural history
Addison Sod House	Kindersley	West Central	Historic house	Pioneer sod house and farmstead
Alameda & District Heritage Museum	Alameda	Southeast	Local history	
Allan Community Heritage Museum	Allan	East Central	Local history	
Allen Sapp Gallery	Battleford	West Central	Art	website, works by Canadian Cree artist Allen Sapp and other First Nation and Inuit artists
Alex Youck School Museum	Regina	Regina	Education	One room schoolhouse, operated by the Regina Public Schools
Allie Griffin Art Gallery	Weyburn	Southeast	Art	Monthly exhibitions by local, regional, and provincial artists and craftspeople, operated by the Weyburn Arts Council in the lower level of Weyburn Public Library
Ancient Echoes Interpretive Centre	Herschel	West Central	Multiple	website, local history, fossils, First Nations culture, natural history
Arcola Museum	Arcola	Southeast	History	Furnished log house built by one of the early settlers; organ from a closed church; steam car
Art Gallery of Regina	Regina	Regina	Art	website, emphasis on Saskatchewan artists, located in the Neil Balkwill Civic Arts Centre
Art Gallery of Swift Current	Swift Current	Southwest	Art	website
Assiniboia & District Museum	Assiniboia	Southwest	Local history	website
Athol Murray College Archives & Museum	Wilcox	Southwest	History	History of Athol Murray College of Notre Dame
Avonlea Heritage Museum	Avonlea	Southwest	Local history	website, local history, pioneer artifacts
Al Mazur Memorial Heritage Park	Hudson Bay	East Central	Open air	website, includes 1909 period village, John Deere tractor collection, tea house with large collection of cups and saucers, logging artifacts, train station and railroad, blacksmith shop
Bateman Historical Museum	Bateman	Southwest	Local history	History of the ghost town, open on request
Batoche National Historic Site	Batoche	West Central	Living	Remains of historic village, depicts lifestyles of the Métis of Batoche between 1860 and 1900
Bengough & District Museum	Bengough	Southwest	Local history	website
Benson-Hingley Military Museum	Humboldt	East Central	Military	Located at the Royal Canadian Legion, features military artifacts, photos, medals, models, memorabilia; formerly known as the Bill Benson Military Museum
Big Bear Trail Museum	Loon Lake	Northern	Local history	
Big Muddy Nature Centre & Museum	Big Beaver	Southwest	Natural history	Adjacent to Big Beaver Regional Park
Big River Memorial Museum	Big River	Northern	Local history	
Biggar Museum	Biggar	West Central	Multiple	website, local history exhibits and art gallery
Birch Hills & District Museum	Birch Hills	East Central	Local history	information, local history, agriculture equipment, operated by the Birch Hills & District Historical Society
Blaine Lake Public Library and Museum	Blaine Lake	West Central	Local history	website, located in a former railway station
Blumenfeld & District Heritage Site	Prelate	Southwest	Local history	website, local history of pioneers and area churches, located in the St. Peter & St. Paul Blumenfeld Church
Borden & District Historical Museum	Borden	West Central	Local history	information
Bresaylor Heritage Museum	Bresaylor	West Central	Local history	information
Briercrest & District Museum	Briercrest	Southeast	Local history	information
Broadview Historical Museum	Broadview	Southeast	Local history	Features a one-room schoolhouse, a 1913 Canadian Pacific Railway Caboose, a reconstructed sod house, the Delorme family's one-room log cabin
Brock Municipal Museum	Brock	West Central	Local history	information
Cabri & District Museum	Cabri	Southwest	Local history	information
Canada's Only Toy & Autograph Museum	Canora	East Central	Toy	website, toys and autographed photos
Cannington Manor Victorian Village	Kenosee Lake	Southeast	Living	Late 19th century Victorian village in Cannington Manor Provincial Park
Canwood Museum	Canwood	Northern	Local history	information
Canora Station House Museum	Canora	East Central	Railway	CN Rail memorabilia, pioneer artifacts, local art
Central Butte District Museum	Central Butte	Southwest	Local history	information
Chapel Gallery	North Battleford	West Central	Art	website, local art
Chaplin Nature Centre	Chaplin		Natural history	website, area natural history, shore birds, brine shrimp and mining industry
Children's Discovery Museum on the Saskatchewan	Saskatoon	West Central	Children's	website
Choiceland Museum	Choiceland	Northern	Local history	information
Civic Museum of Regina	Regina	Southeast	Local history	website, city's history, formerly called Regina Plains Museum
Claybank Brick Plant National Historic Site	Claybank	Southwest	Industry	Historic clay brick-making factory
Clayton McLain Memorial Museum	Cut Knife	West Central	Local history	website, information
Climax Community Museum	Climax	Southwest	Local history	information
Coronach District Museum	Coronach	Southwest	Local history	website
Country Craft Shoppe & Homestead Museum	Hodgeville	Southwest	Local history	information
Cudworth Museum	Cudworth	East Central	Local history	information, information, located in a former railway station
Cupar Heritage Museum	Cupar	Southeast	Local history	website
Deep South Pioneer Museum	Ogema	Southwest	Open air	website, pioneer village and farm yard
Diefenbaker Canada Centre	Saskatoon	West Central	History	Part of the University of Saskatchewan, Canadian history and culture, life of John G. Diefenbaker, Canada's 13th Prime Minister
Diefenbaker House	Prince Albert	Northern	Historic house	Pioneer homestead, operated by the Prince Albert Historical Society
Doc's Town Heritage Village	Swift Current	Southwest	Open air	website, early 20th century small prairie town
Dodsland & District Museum	Dodsland	West Central	Local history	information
Doukhobor Dugout House	Blaine Lake	West Central	Living	website, Doukhobor settler life
Dr. Ernest Luthi Heritage Home	Punnichy	Southeast	Art	information
Duck Lake Interpretive Centre	Duck Lake	West Central	Local history	website, located in a former North-West Mounted Police jail, First Nations, Métis and pioneer history, culture and traditions
Dunlop Art Gallery	Regina	Southeast	Art	Facility of the Regina Public Library, visual art in contemporary culture
Dysart & District Museum	Dysart	Southeast	Local history	information
E. A. Rawlinson Centre	Prince Albert	Northern	Art	website, arts and culture centre, includes the Mann Art Gallery and the Olive and John G. Diefenbaker Theatre
Eastend Historical Museum	Eastend	Southwest	Local history	website, local history, historic buildings
Elbow Museum	Elbow	Southwest	Local history	information
Elrose Museum	Elrose	West Central	Local history	information, information
Esterhazy Community Museum	Esterhazy	Southeast	Local history	information
Estevan Art Gallery & Museum	Estevan	Southeast	Multiple	website, art gallery and seasonal historical and law enforcement museum, NWMP Wood End Post Historical Site
Evolution of Education Museum	Prince Albert	Northern	Education	Early 20th century one room schoolhouse, operated by the Prince Albert Historical Society
Farwell's Trading Post	Maple Creek	Southwest	History	
F. T. Hill Museum	Riverhurst	Southwest	History	information, website, collections include guns, Indian artifacts, pioneer tools, implements, furniture and clothing, harnesses and saddles, Saskatchewan license plates, area fossils
Fifth Parallel Gallery	Regina	Southeast	Art	website, part of the University of Regina
Foam Lake Museum	Foam Lake	East Central	Local history	information
Fort Battleford National Historic Site	Battleford	West Central	History	Restored late 19th century North-West Mounted Police fort
Fort Carlton Provincial Park	Duck Lake	West Central	Open air	Recreated 19th century fur trading post
Fort Pelly Livingston Museum	Pelly	East Central	Local history	website
Fort Qu'Appelle Museum	Fort Qu'Appelle	Southeast	Local history	information
Fort Walsh	Maple Creek	Southwest	Military	Restored 19th century fort and townsite
Frank Cameron Museum	Wynyard	East Central	Local history	information
Fred Light Museum	Battleford	West Central	Local history	website
Frenchman Butte Museum	Frenchman Butte	West Central	Local history	information, historic buildings
General Store Memories, Museum and Antiques	Blaine Lake	West Central	History	information, information, antiques, collectibles, and local history
Gervais Wheels Museum	Alida	Southeast	History	information, artifacts; music boxes; gramophones; North American automobiles
Glaslyn & District Museum	Glaslyn	Northern	Local history	information, local history and railway artifacts
Godfrey Dean Art Gallery	Yorkton	East Central	Art	website
Goodsoil Historical Museum	Goodsoil	Northern	Local history	information, local history and pioneer buildings
Gordon Snelgrove Art Gallery	Saskatoon	West Central	Art	website, part of the University of Saskatchewan
Government House	Regina	Southeast	History	Provincial history, life around 1900
Grand Coteau Heritage & Culture Centre	Shaunavon	Southwest	Multiple	website, includes an art gallery, natural history displays, local history and period room and business displays, library branch
Gravelbourg & District Museum	Gravelbourg	Southwest	Local history	website
Great Sandhills Museum	Sceptre	Southwest	Local history	website, local history, period room and business displays
Grenfell Museum	Grenfell	Southeast	Historic house	website, Victorian period house, local history displays
Gull Lake Museum	Gull Lake	Southwest	Local history	information
Harris Museum	Harris	West Central	Local history	information
Hepburn Museum of Wheat	Hepburn	West Central	Agriculture	information, located in a grain elevator, also local history
Herbert CPR Train Station Museum	Herbert	Southwest	Railway	information, also local history
Heritage Hazenmore Museum	Hazenmore	Southwest	Local history	information
Heritage of Hope Museum	Denzil	West Central	Local history	information
Hudson Bay Museum	Hudson Bay	East Central	Local history	website, local history, period room and business displays
Humboldt & District Museum	Humboldt	East Central	Multiple	website, local history, period room and business displays, changing exhibits of art, photography and culture
Humboldt Area Vintage & Antique Club	Humboldt	East Central	Agriculture	Includes antique tractors, a 1918 steam engine, threshing machines, farm implements, a 1930s period house, barn and shop
Humboldt Station	East Central	History	information	
Indian Head Museum	Indian Head	Southeast	Local history	website, includes firehall, school, 1880s cottage, 1930s garage, military display
Ituna & District Museum	Ituna	East Central	Local history	information
Jasper Cultural & Historical Centre	Maple Creek	Southwest	Multiple	website, local history, period room and business displays, art gallery
Kaposvar Historic Site	Esterhazy	Southeast	History	information, historic church, history of Hungarian and Slovak settlers
Kelliher & District Museum	Kelliher	Southeast	Local history	information, local history, period business displays and antiques
Kellross Heritage Museum	Kelliher	East Central	Local history	information
Kenderdine Art Gallery	Saskatoon	West Central	Art	website, part of the University of Saskatchewan
Kincaid Museum	Kincaid	Southwest	Local history	information
Kindersley Plains Museum	Kindersley	West Central	Local history	information
Kinistino & District Pioneer Museum	Kinistino	East Central	Local history	website, information
Kipling Museum	Kipling	Southeast	Open air	website, includes 1903 furnished heritage home, schoolhouse, blacksmith shop, dental office, service station, church, antique machinery
Kisbey Museum	Kisbey	Southeast	History	information, old school house and artifacts
Kronau Bethlehem Heritage Museum	Kronau	Southeast	Local history	information
Kyle & District Museum	Kyle	West Central	Local history	information
Lafleche & District Museum	Lafleche	Southwest	Local history	information
Lakeside Heritage Museum	Regina Beach	Southeast	Local history	information
Lancer Centennial Museum	Lancer	Southwest	Local history	information
Langham & District Heritage Village & Museum	Langham	West Central	Local history	information, information
Lanigan & District Heritage Centre	Lanigan	East Central	Local history	information, located in a 1908 railway station
Lashburn Centennial Museum	Lashburn	West Central	Local history	information
Last Mountain House Provincial Historic Park	Craven	Southeast	Open air	website, information, recreated 19th century fur trading post
Le Beau Village Museum	St. Victor	Southwest	Local history	website, local history of the St. Victor Roman Catholic Church and its parish
Lebret Museum	Fort Qu'Appelle	Southeast	Local history	website, local history, pioneer and religious artifacts
LeRoy & District Heritage Museum	LeRoy	East Central	Local history	information
Lloydminster Cultural & Science Centre	Lloydminster	West Central	Multiple	website, art gallery, wildlife display, heavy oil science centre; formerly the Barr Colony Heritage Cultural Centre
Lucky Lake Heritage Museum	Lucky Lake	West Central	Local history	information
Lumsden Museum	Lumsden	Southeast	Open air	information, information, 1920s village, includes a church, 1910 home, school, blacksmith shop, stable
Luseland & Districts Museum	Luseland	West Central	Local history	information
MacKenzie Art Gallery	Regina	Southeast	Art	
Macklin & District Museum	Macklin	West Central	Local history	information
Macrorie Museum	Macrorie	Southwest	Local history	information
Maidstone & District Museum	Maidstone	West Central	Local history	information
Main Centre Heritage Museum	Main Centre	Southwest	Local history	information
Manitou Pioneers Museum	Neilburg	West Central	Local history	information
Mankota Museum	Mankota	Southwest	Open air	information, historic pioneer buildings and antique farm equipment.
Marr Residence	Saskatoon	West Central	Historic house	1884 house, features an exhibit on the relationships between settlers and First Nations during the Northwest Resistance of 1885.
McCord & District Museum	McCord	Southwest	Local history	website, located in a former railway station and a church
Meadow Lake Museum	Meadow Lake	Northern	Local history	information, information
Meewasin Valley Centre	Saskatoon	West Central	Multiple	website, local history and natural history, ecology
Melfort & District Museum	Melfort	East Central	Open air	website, pioneer village, farm machinery, equipment and tools
Melville Heritage Museum	Melville	East Central	Local history	information
Mennonite Heritage Museum	Rosthern	Northern	Local history	information
Mennonite Heritage Village	Swift Current	Southwest	Open air	website, 1880s-1920s period village
Milden Community Museum	Milden	West Central	Local history	information
Moose Jaw Museum & Art Gallery	Moose Jaw	Southwest	Multiple	website, local history and art
Moosomin Regional Museum	Moosomin	Southeast	Local history	information
Mortlach Museum	Mortlach	Southwest	Local history	website, located in a former fire hall and jail
Morse Museum & Cultural Centre	Morse	Southwest	Multiple	website, local history, pioneer artifacts, art gallery
Mossbank & District Museum	Mossbank	Southwest	Local history	website, local history, working blacksmith shop, schoolhouse
Motherwell Homestead National Historic Site	Abernethy	Southeast	History	Early 20th century homestead and farm
Musee Ukraina Museum	Saskatoon	West Central	Ethnic	information, currently in storage awaiting new facility
Museum of Natural Sciences	Saskatoon	West Central	Natural history	website, part of the University of Saskatchewan, living plants, animals, fossils, rocks, minerals
Museum of Antiquities	Saskatoon	West Central	Art	Part of the University of Saskatchewan, ancient Greek, Roman, Egyptian and Near Eastern sculpture in full-scale replica
Naicam Museum	Naicam	East Central	Local history	website, information
National Doukhobour Heritage Village	Veregin	East Central	Open air	Early 20th century Doukhobor village
Neutral Ground Contemporary Art Forum	Regina	Southeast	Art	website
Nipawin Living Forestry Museum	Nipawin	East Central	Open air	website, forestry equipment and buildings, household artifacts, vintage vehicles, fully functional steam-powered saw and shingle mills, tractors, restored historic houses
Nokomis District Museum	Nokomis	East Central	Local history	website, information, local history, period room and business displays, railroad artifacts, located in a former railway station
North Battleford Sports Museum & Hall of Fame	North Battleford	West Central	Sports	information
Northern Gateway Museum	Denare Beach	Northern	Local history	information
Notukeu Heritage Museum	Ponteix	Southwest	Archaeology	information, archaeology, paleontology; fossils, prehistoric arrowheads, tools and artifacts
Osler Historical Museum	Osler	West Central	Historic house	information, 1930-40s period house, also one room school
Outlook & District Heritage Museum	Outlook	West Central	Local history	Located in a former railway station
Pasquia Regional Park	Arborfield	East Central	Natural history	website, dinosaurs and fossils
PAVED Arts	Saskatoon	West Central	Art	New media art centre
Perdue Museum	Perdue	West Central	Local history	information
Plenty & District Museum	Plenty	West Central	Local history	information
Porcupine Plain & District Museum	Porcupine Plain	East Central	Local history	website, includes a period log house, church and schoolhouse
Poundmaker Historical Centre	Cut Knife	West Central	First Nations	information, history and artifacts of the Poundmaker Cree Nation
Power House Museum	Kamsack	East Central	Local history	information, information, located in a former power station
Prairie River Museum	Prairie River	East Central	Local history	Housed in a former railway station
Prairie West Historical Centre	Eston	West Central	Multiple	website, local history, art, period rooms, schoolhouse, homesteader's shack, agriculture display
Prairie Winds & Silver Sage	Val Marie	Southwest	Multiple	website, art exhibits, natural history of Grasslands National Park
Preeceville & District Heritage Museum	Preeceville	East Central	Local history	website, local history, railroad artifacts
Prince Albert Arts Centre	Prince Albert	Northern	Art	Exhibits in the John V. Hicks Gallery
Prince Albert Historical Museum	Prince Albert	Northern	Local history	Operated by the Prince Albert Historical Society, history of the area in the city's first firehall
Prud'homme Multicultural Museum	Prud'homme	East Central	Local history	information, information, local history and ethnic heritage
Punnichy & District Museum	Punnichy	Southeast	Local history	information
Quill Lakes International Bird Area Interpretive Centre	Wynyard	East Central	Natural history	information, history and natural history of Quill Lake, an important bird sanctuary
Radisson Zion Museum	Radisson	West Central	Local history	website, information, located in a former church, period business displays and antiques
Ralph Allen Memorial Museum	Oxbow	Southeast	Local history	information
Raymore Pioneer Museum	Raymore	Southeast	Local history	information
RCMP Heritage Centre	Regina	Southeast	Law enforcement	History of the Royal Canadian Mounted Police
Regina Firefighters Museum	Regina	Southeast	Firefighting	information
Remai Modern	Saskatoon	West Central	Art	Modern and contemporary art
Reynold Rapp Museum	Spalding	East Central	Local history	Artifacts from the Spalding area, and memorabilia from Reynold Rapp's time in parliament as Conservative Whip
Rocanville & District Museum	Rocanville	Southeast	Local history	information, information
Rouleau & District Museum	Rouleau	Southwest	Local history	information
Rosetown & District Museum	Rosetown	West Central	Local history	information, information
Rose Valley Heritage Museum	Rose Valley	East Central	Local history	information
Rotary Museum of Police and Corrections	Prince Albert	Northern	Law enforcement	Operated by the Prince Albert Historical Society, history of law enforcement in early Prince Albert and Saskatchewan
Saskatoon Museum of Military Artifacts	Saskatoon	West Central	Military	Website, uniforms, medals, artifacts and war memorabilia
Royal Saskatchewan Museum	Regina	Southeast	Natural history	Includes natural history, First Nations and geology sections
Royal Northwest Mounted Police Post Museum	Creighton	Northern	Law enforcement	information, information, replica of an early 1900s Royal Northwest Mounted Police post
Rusty Relics Museum	Carlyle	Southeast	Railway	Located in a railway station, railway artifacts, farming machinery
Saltcoats Museum	Saltcoat	East Central	Local history	information
Saskatchewan Baseball Hall of Fame	Battleford	West Central	Sports	website, information, information
Saskatchewan Burrowing Owl Interpretive Centre	Moose Jaw	Southwest	Natural history	website, biology and conservation of burrowing owls
Saskatchewan Indian Cultural Centre	Saskatoon	West Central	First Nations	website
Saskatchewan Landing Provincial Park	Kyle	West Central	Multiple	website, visitor interpretive centre with exhibits about the natural and cultural history of the park
Saskatchewan Science Centre	Regina	Southeast	Science	Exhibits include live animals, space, agriculture, dinosaurs, the environment, hockey
Saskatchewan Military Museum	Regina	Southeast	Military	information
Saskatchewan Railway Museum	Saskatoon	West Central	Railway	
Saskatchewan River Valley Museum	Hague	West Central	Local history	information
Saskatchewan Sports Hall of Fame & Museum	Regina	Southeast	Sports	website
Saskatchewan Western Development Museum	Moose Jaw	Southwest	Transportation	Impact of different means of transportation on area growth, industry and culture
Saskatchewan Western Development Museum	North Battleford	West Central	Open air	1920s heritage farm and village
Saskatchewan Western Development Museum	Saskatoon	West Central	Open air	Over 30 buildings represent a typical Saskatchewan 1910 boomtown
Saskatchewan Western Development Museum	Yorkton	East Central	Ethnic	Immigrant cultures, including Ukrainians, English, Swedes, Germans, Doukhobors and Icelanders
Seager Wheeler's Maple Grove Farm	Rosthern	West Central	Farm	Working farm and history of farming techniques
Semans & District Museum	Semans	East Central	Local history	information
Shamrock Museum	Shamrock	Southwest	Local history	information
Shell Lake Museum	Shell Lake	Northern	Local history	information, located in a former railway station
Shellbrook Museum	Shellbrook	Northern	Local history	information, located in a former railway station
Soo Line Historical Museum	Weyburn	Southeast	Multiple	website, features large collection of silver, also brass, china, crystal, and antique furniture, local history, period room and business displays
Souris Valley Antique Museum	Midale	Southeast	Local history	website
Southwest Saskatchewan Oldtimer's Museum	Maple Creek	Southwest	History	information, pioneer and historic artifacts
Spiritwood & District Museum	Spiritwood	Northern	Historic house	information, 1930s-1950s period house
Spy Hill Museum	Spy Hill	Southeast	Local history	information
St. Brieux Museum	St. Brieux	East Central	Local history	website, information
St. Mary's Church Museum	Maxstone	Southwest	Historic site	website, historic church
St. Thomas More College Art Gallery	Saskatoon	West Central	Art	website
St. Walburg Museum	St. Walburg	West Central	Local history	information, information, located in a former church
Star City Heritage Museum	Star City	East Central	Local history	website
Station Arts Centre	Rosthern	Northern	Art	website, art gallery, seminar space, tea room and performing arts theatre
Stoughton & District Museum	Stoughton	Southeast	Local history	information
Strasbourg & District Museum	Strasbourg	Southeast	Local history	information
Sturgis Station House Museum	Sturgis	East Central	Local history	information, local history, railroad artifacts
Sukanen Ship Pioneer Village and Museum	Moose Jaw	Southwest	Open air	Includes pioneer village, a farmyard (house and barn), Tom Sukanen's ship, Diefenbaker Homestead, firefighting collection
Swift Current Museum	Swift Current	Southwest	Local history	information, information
Theodore Historical Museum	Theodore	East Central	Local history	Located in a former railway station
Tisdale & District Museum	Tisdale		Open air	website, local history, pioneer village, antique automobiles
Tompkins Sod House National Historic Site	Tompkins	Southwest	History	information
T.rex Discovery Centre	Eastend	Southwest	Natural history	Dinosaurs and fossils
Turner Curling Museum	Weyburn	Southeast	Sports	information, history, equipment and memorabilia of curling
Turtleford & District Museum	Turtleford	West Central	Local history	information, information
Ukrainian Heritage Museum, Canora	Canora	East Central	Ethnic	information, information
Ukrainian Museum of Canada	Saskatoon	West Central	Ethnic	website
Unity & District Heritage Museum	Unity	West Central	Open air	website, includes restored schools, a church, 1912 home, harness shop, restored cars, trucks, agriculture machinery
University of Saskatchewan Computer Museum	Saskatoon	West Central	Technology	website, part of the University of Saskatchewan, computer equipment and technology
Vanguard Museum	Vanguard	Southwest	Local history	information
Vintage Power Museum	Prince Albert	Northern	Agriculture	information, information, agriculture equipment and machinery, buildings
Wadena & District Museum & Nature Centre	Wadena	East Central	Multiple	information, information, local history, pioneer life and buildings, natural history of Quill Lake, an important bird sanctuary
Wakaw Heritage Museum	Wakaw	East Central	Local history	website, information
Waldheim Public Museum	Waldheim	West Central	Local history	information, located in a former railway station
Wanuskewin Heritage Park	Saskatoon	West Central	First Nations	
Washbrook Museum	Edam	West Central	Local history	information, located in a former grain elevator
Waskesiu Heritage Museum	Waskesiu Lake	Northern	Local history	website, local history of the town and Prince Albert National Park
Watson & District Heritage Museum	Watson	East Central	Local history	website, information
Wawota & District Museum	Wawota	Southeast	Local history	information, information
Weyburn Area Heritage Village	Weyburn	Southeast	Open air	website, early 20th century village buildings
Whitewood Historical Museum	Whitewood	Southeast	Local history	information, located in the Rex Theatre
Wilkie & District Museum	Wilkie	West Central	Local history	information
Willow Bunch Museum	Willow Bunch	Southwest	Local history	website
Wilson Museum	Dundurn	West Central	Local history	information, information, local history, antiques
Wolseley Community Museum	Wolseley	Southeast	Local history	website, information
Wood Mountain Rodeo & Ranching Museum	Wood Mountain	Southwest	Multiple	Located in Wood Mountain Regional Park, includes the Rodeo Ranch Museum with cowboy artifacts, Wood Mountain Post Historic Park with history of the North-West Mounted Police and the Sioux
Yester-Years Community Museum	Dinsmore	West Central	Local history	information
Yorkton Sports Hall of Fame & Museum	Yorkton	East Central	Sports	Located on the second floor of the Gallagher Centre

== Defunct museums ==
- Mendel Art Gallery, Saskatoon, closed in 2015 to prepare for the opening of Remai Modern in 2017
- Robsart Art Works, Robsart

== See also ==
- Nature centres in Saskatchewan
