= Tötbrief =

Tötbrief was a term applied in Germany to the edicts issued by the kings and emperors, to the papal bulls, and to the edicts of various ecclesiastical authorities, by which the Christians were exempted from paying their debts to Jews. The Tötbrief might deprive the creditor either of the interest due on the money loaned or of both principal and interest.

The first Tötbrief known was that of Louis VII of France, who, at the instigation of Peter Venerabilis, Abbot of Cluny, issued in 1146 a decree exempting all Crusaders from payment of their debts to the Jews, in accordance with the papal enactment of Pope Eugene III in the preceding year. Later, in 1180, Philip Augustus relieved all Christians from their liabilities to their Jewish creditors on condition of their paying to him the fifth part of their debts. Louis VIII annulled, in 1223, all debts due to Jews by Christians that had been outstanding for five years or more, and canceled the interest on debts less than five years old.

In Germany, in the 14th century, such cancellations were common. The first case in which Jews were deprived of the interest due to them was in 1299, when King Albert diverted such interest payments to the Monastery of Eberbach. After the time of Henry VII and Louis the Bavarian cancellations of the whole debt, principal and interest, were very frequent. The former exempted (1312) Conrad of Weinsberg from the payment of such debts; while the latter relieved (1315) the city of Esslingen from its debts to the Jews of Überlingen as well as to other Jews who had settled in cities hostile to him. In 1316 Louis issued a similar edict in favor of the inhabitants of Heilbronn; in 1323, in favor of the Abbey of Fulda; in 1326, in favor of a number of noblemen who owed money to Jews of Alsace; in 1332, in favor of the Abbey of Bamberg. These exemptions were even more numerous in the third and fourth decades of the 14th century, when, during the persecutions, the emperors canceled the claims of Jews both living and dead.

All these were single instances of the cancellation of debts due to Jews; only under King Wenceslaus, toward the end of the 14th century, did the Tötbrief assume seriously comprehensive proportions. On June 12, 1385, the king concluded a treaty with the representatives of all the Swabian towns, who agreed that their municipalities should pay the king 40,000 gulden in return for a "privilege," consisting of eight articles, by which their debts to Jews were either entirely or partially canceled, and through which the Jews finally lost all their claims. For, while many Jews who had the means recovered part of the money due to them by paying a certain sum to the city authorities, King Wenceslaus, in order to check this, issued a second edict (1390), commanding the Jews to abandon all claim to debts due from Christians. It must be said, however, that the Tötbrief of 1390 did not apply throughout the whole German empire, but only to its southwestern part, as Bavaria, Würzburg, and other provinces. In Spain the same sort of edict was called a "moratoria".
