= Tottori City Historical Museum =

- 鳥取市歴史博物館
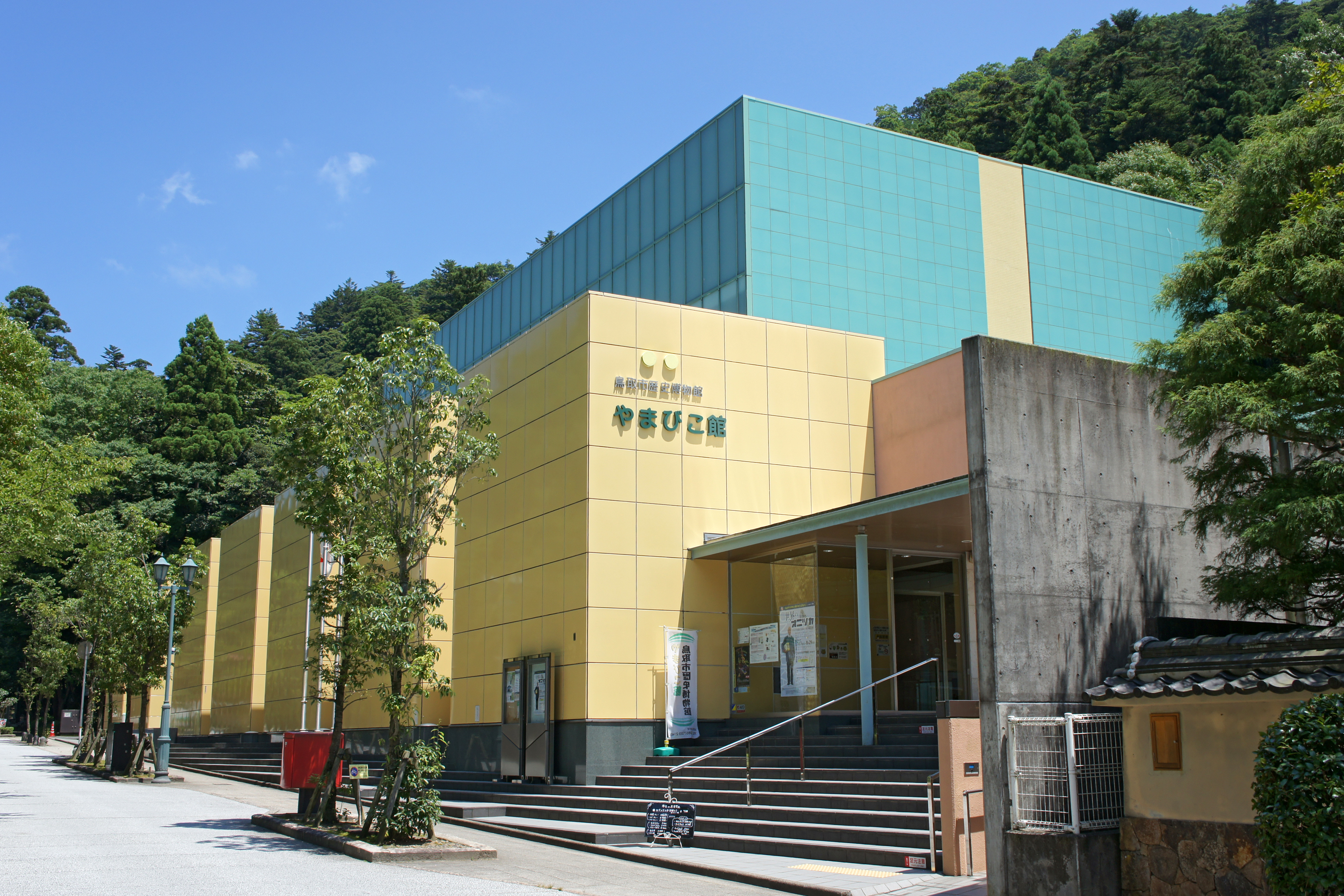

General information
- Location: 88, Ue-machi, Tottori, Tottori Prefecture, Japan
- Coordinates: 35°29′56″N 134°14′38″E
- Opened: 2000

Website
- homepage

The Tottori City Historical Museum (鳥取市歴史博物館, Tottori-shi Rekishi Hakubutsukan) opened in Tottori, Japan, in 2000 and is dedicated to the history of the city.

== See also ==
- Tottori Folk Crafts Museum
