= Jewish Historical Museum =

Jewish Historical Museum may refer to:

- Joods Historisch Museum, Amsterdam
- Jewish Historical Museum, Belgrade
- Saint John Jewish Historical Museum
