= North Brevard Historical Museum =

Museum in Florida

- Location within Florida
- Established: 1989
- Location: 301 South Washington Avenue; Titusville, Florida
- Coordinates: 28.612548°N 80.807464°W
- Type: History

The North Brevard Historical Museum is located at 301 South Washington Avenue, Titusville, Florida.

The museum opened when a local businessman, Glenn Patch, offered his commercial building to be used in October 1988. In December 1995, Patch then donated the museum building and the adjoining building to The Historical Society of North Brevard. Patch recognized the "value of an historical society to the community."

The museum houses historical artifacts, including historic postcards, photographs, clothing from as early as the 1870s, and a Seminole Indian display.
