= Lake Worth Historical Museum =

Museum in Lake Worth Beach, Florida

Coordinates: 26°36′58″N 80°3′10″W

The Lake Worth Historical Museum was established to serve as the repository to preserve the history and culture of the city of Lake Worth Beach, Florida, by collecting, organizing and exhibiting artifacts, books, photographs, and other materials which record the development of Lake Worth and the cultural history of the immediate surrounding area. The museum is located on the second floor of the Old Lake Worth City Hall at 414 Lake Avenue and is currently open on Wednesday and Friday from 1:00-4:00 p.m.

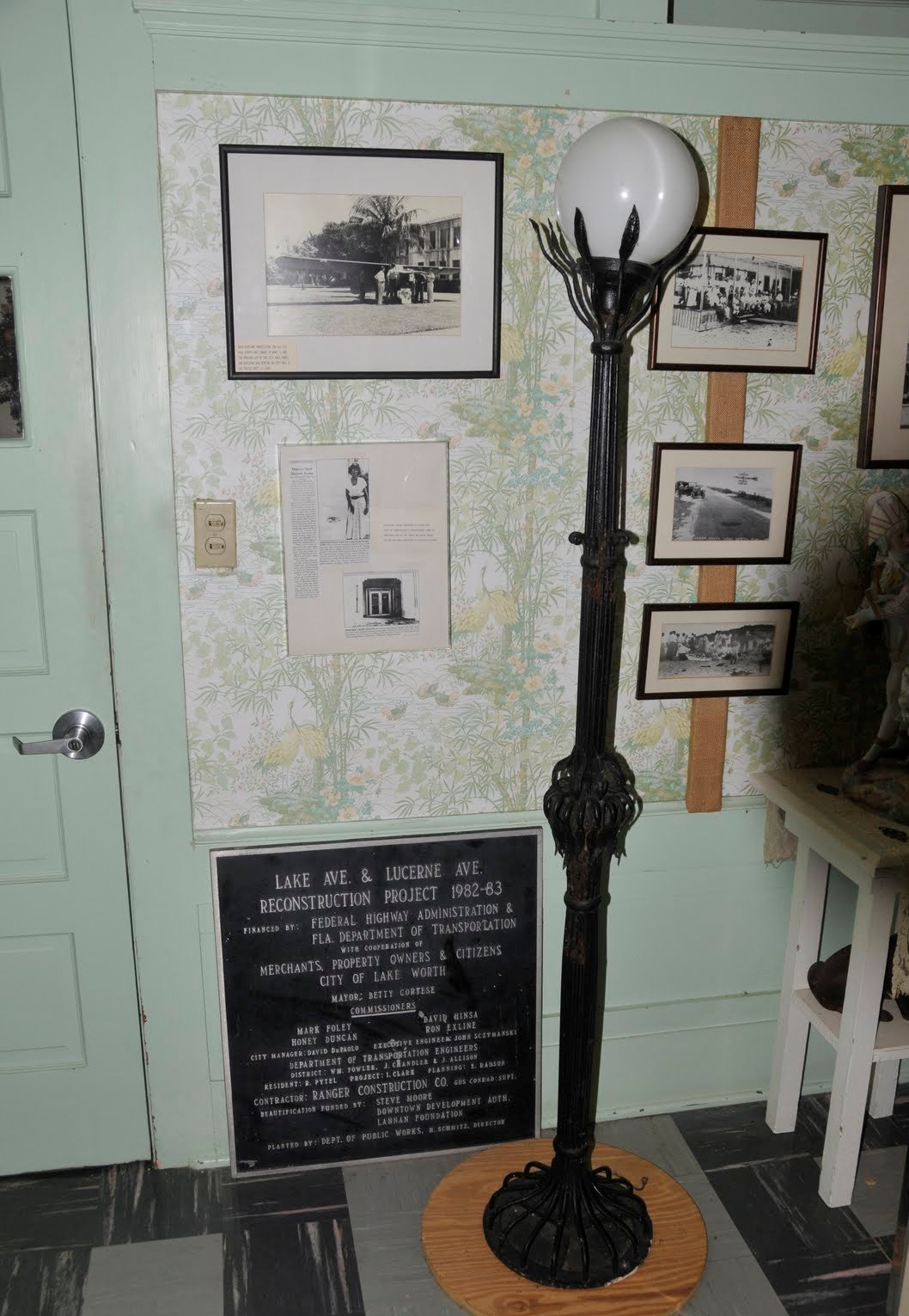
Artifacts Display

== Exhibits ==
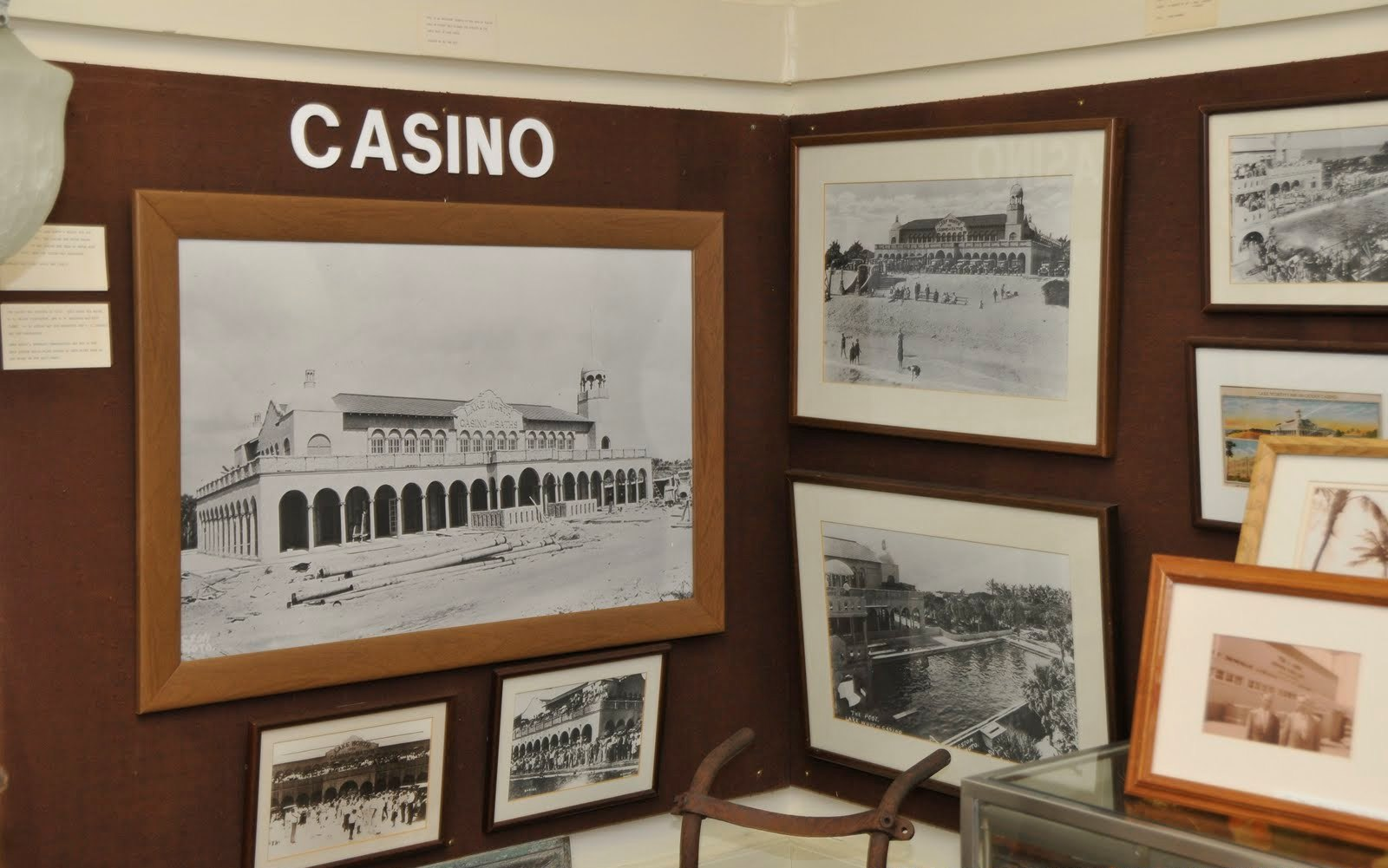
One of many photo displays.

Displays include hundreds of photos of the history of the City including downtown businesses, the municipal beach, churches, municipal buildings and parks.

Textile exhibits show visitors how the pioneers dressed and "modern conveniences" such as the ice box and the wringer washer reveal how early residents lived and worked. Items on display range in size from the very large (such as the telephone switchboard from a hotel) to the much smaller (such as the collection of cameras and medical instruments). Display cases maintained by local Finns, Poles and Lithuanians are highlights of the heritage exhibits.

== Historical maps ==
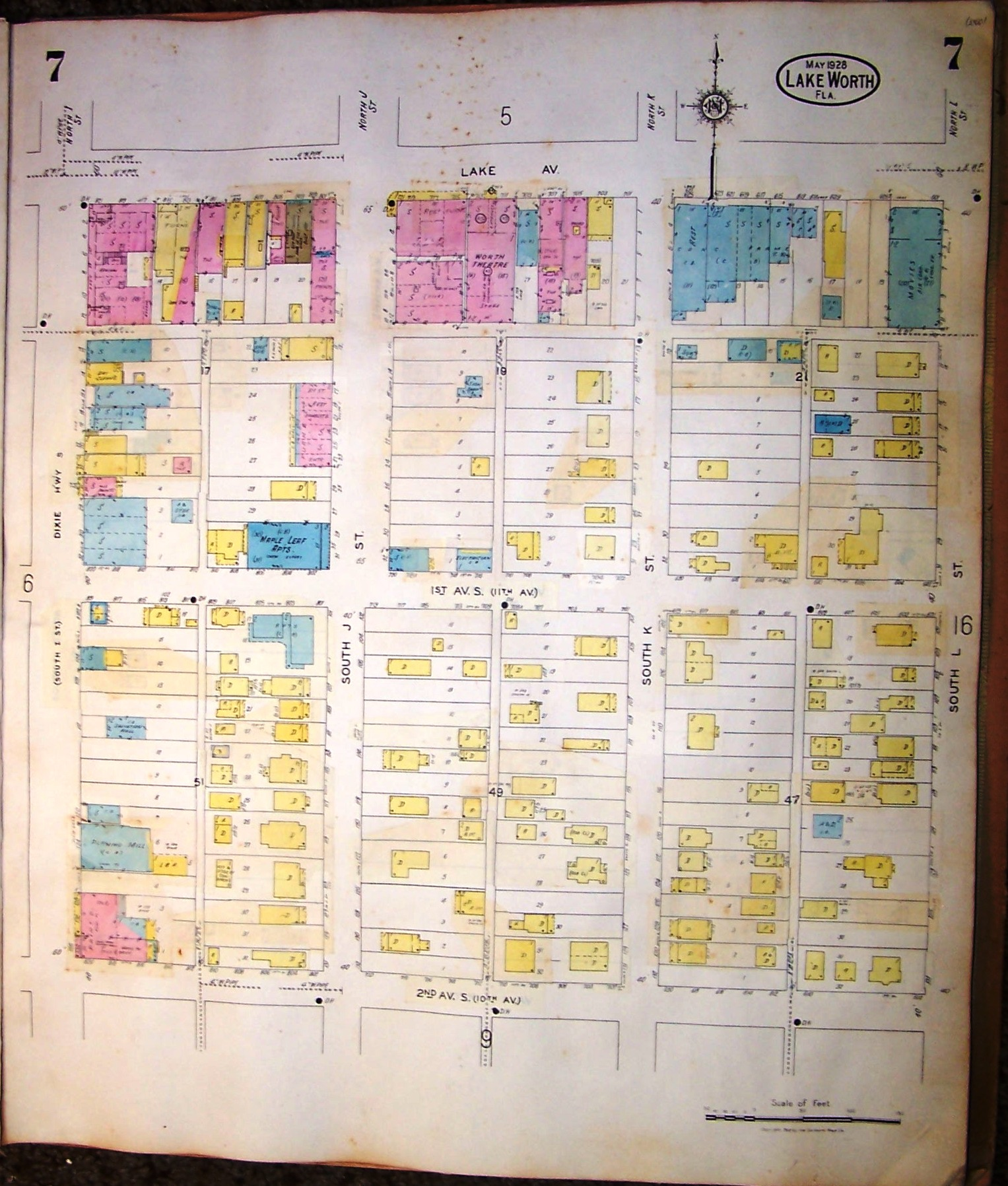
Sample Page from Sanborn Map Book

1928 Sanborn maps book (updated 1940; 1947) depicts most of the City, block by block, house by house. Photos of each page can be found at Map Images.
