= Historical Museum of St. James – Assiniboia =

Civic museum in Manitoba

Historical Museum of St. James- Assiniboia
- Established: 1856; 170 years ago (House built); 1911; 115 years ago (Municipal Hall built)
- Coordinates: 49.8806°N 97.2883°W
- Type: Civic museum
- Public transit access: 11 Portage-Kildonan; 21 Portage Express; 22 Assiniboia Express; 82 Grace Hospital - Unicity

The Historical Museum of St. James – Assiniboia is a museum in Winnipeg, Manitoba, Canada. The museum primarily consists of a two-story post-and-plank house built in 1856 and once owned by William Brown and Charlotte Omand. The home is furnished with pieces from the period between 1860 and 1890.

The museum also features two other buildings: the Municipal Hall Building built in 1911 which contains exhibits from the St. James-Assiniboia area and surrounding parishes and an auxiliary building which features exhibits concerning blacksmithing, farming, and transportation.

== Affiliations ==
The Museum is affiliated with: CMA, CHIN, and Virtual Museum of Canada.
