= Rusk County Historical Society Museum =

Museum in Ladysmith, Wisconsin, US

Coordinates: 45°28′20.7″N 91°05′54.6″W

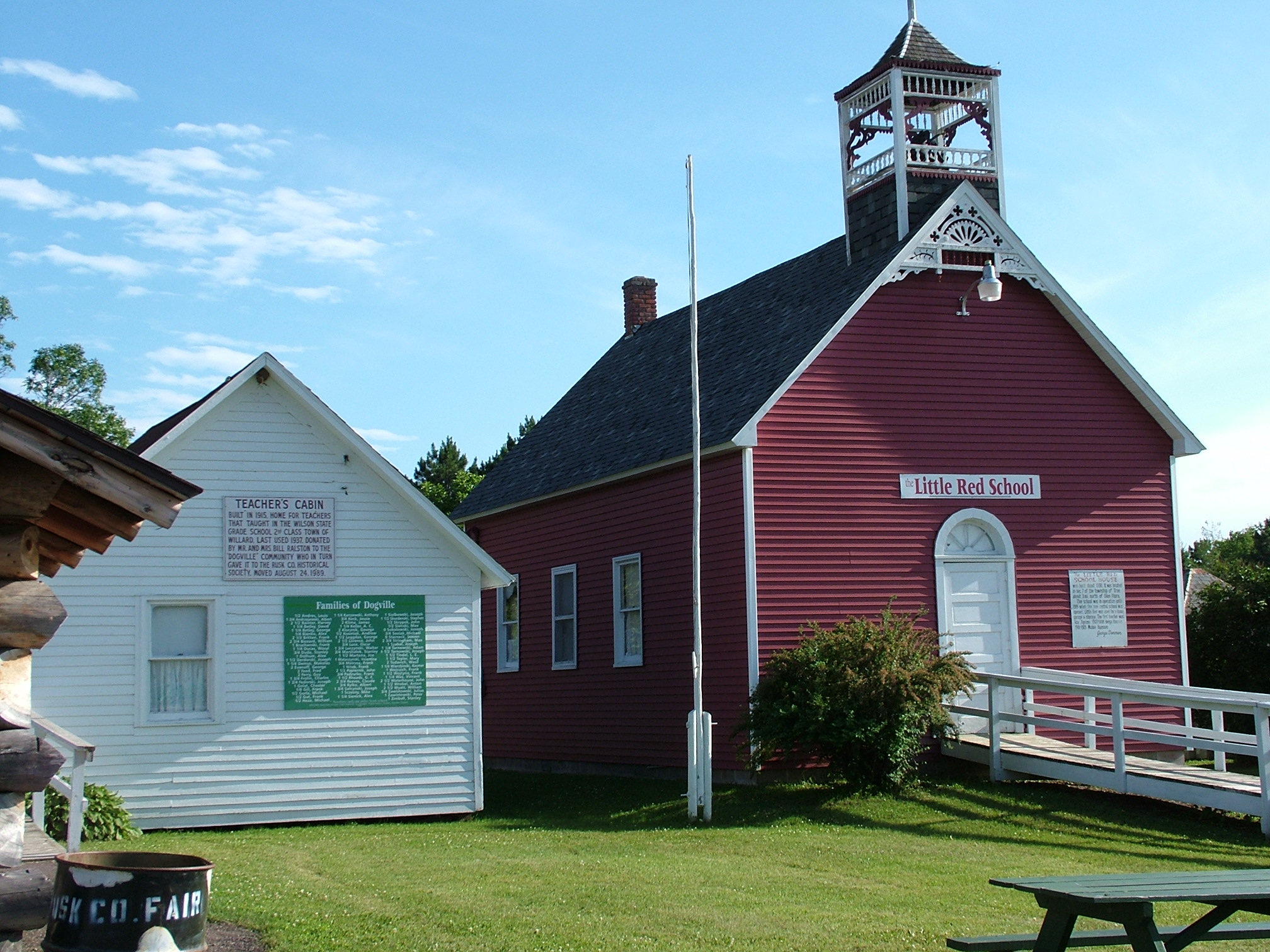
The Rusk County Historical Museum's Little Red Schoolhouse.

The Rusk County Historical Society Museum is a museum in Ladysmith, Wisconsin, United States. The museum contains over 9,000 artifacts relating to the history of Rusk County. The Rusk County Historical Society was incorporated in 1955 and is a non-profit organization. The historical society has a museum that is located at the Rusk County Fairgrounds in Ladysmith, WI. The museum is open from 12:30-4:30 on weekends Memorial Day through Labor Day. The objectives of the society are the discovery, preservation, and public dissemination of the history of Rusk County and the State of Wisconsin.

The museum is an open air style museum that consists of several different buildings that are connected by walkways. Buildings at the museum include the following:

- Henry Golat Welcome and Research Building
- Little Red Schoolhouse
- Teacher's Cabin
- Gates County Courthouse
- Log Cabin
- Flambeau Mine Visitors Center
- Jones LeCount Military Building
- Logging and Farm Equipment Building
- Glen Flora Jail
- Farm Machine Shed
- NATO Tank
