= Historical Museum Bamberg =

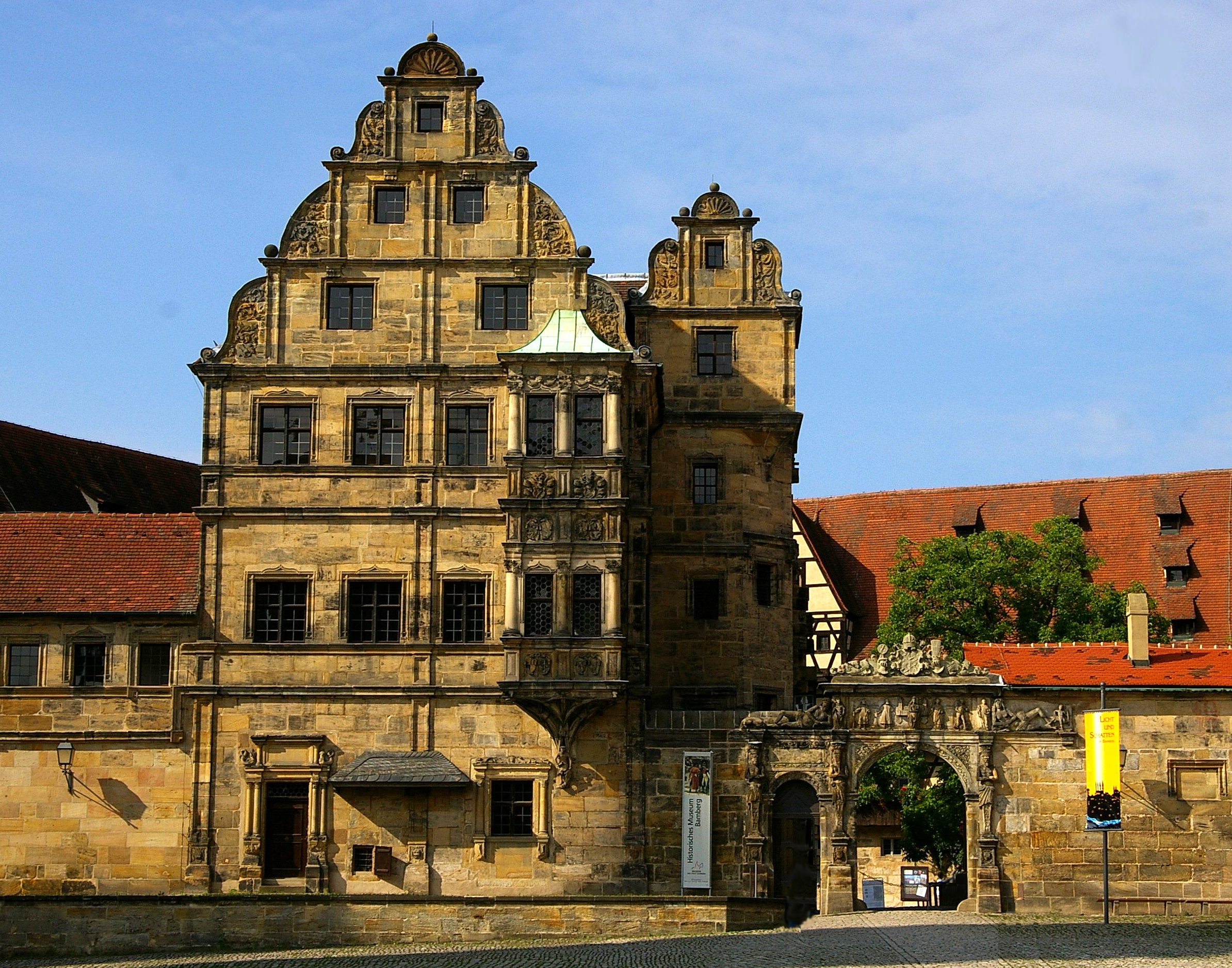
- Location: Bamberg, Germany
- Coordinates: 49°53′27″N 10°52′57″E
- Website: museum.bamberg.de
- Location of Historical Museum Bamberg

The Historical Museum of Bamberg (German: Historisches Museum Bamberg) is a museum in Bamberg, Germany, located in the Alte Hofhaltung next to the city's cathedral. Together with the Villa Dessauer and the Collection Ludwig, a collection of porcelain and faience, it belongs to the museums of the city.

== History ==
In 1838 Vicar Joseph Hemmerlein passed his large art collection on to the City of Bamberg. This is regarded as the birth of the museum. In the following century the museum continuously added new objects to the collection.

The museum was located in the Michaelsberg Abbey until 1935. In 1938 it was moved in the Alte Hofhaltung, near the cathedral of Bamberg.

== Collection ==
The Historical Museum Bamberg owns a fund of historical objects, which range from the prehistory to the current century. Beside a large art collection and stone sculptures, there are several handicraft objects, clocks from the 16th–19th centuries and a wide range of coins from numerous different ages.

Furthermore, the Historical Museum Bamberg has a collection of astronomical and mathematical tools, as well as a compilation of nativity scenes exhibited during the Christmas season.
