= Tottori Folk Crafts Museum =

- 鳥取民芸美術館
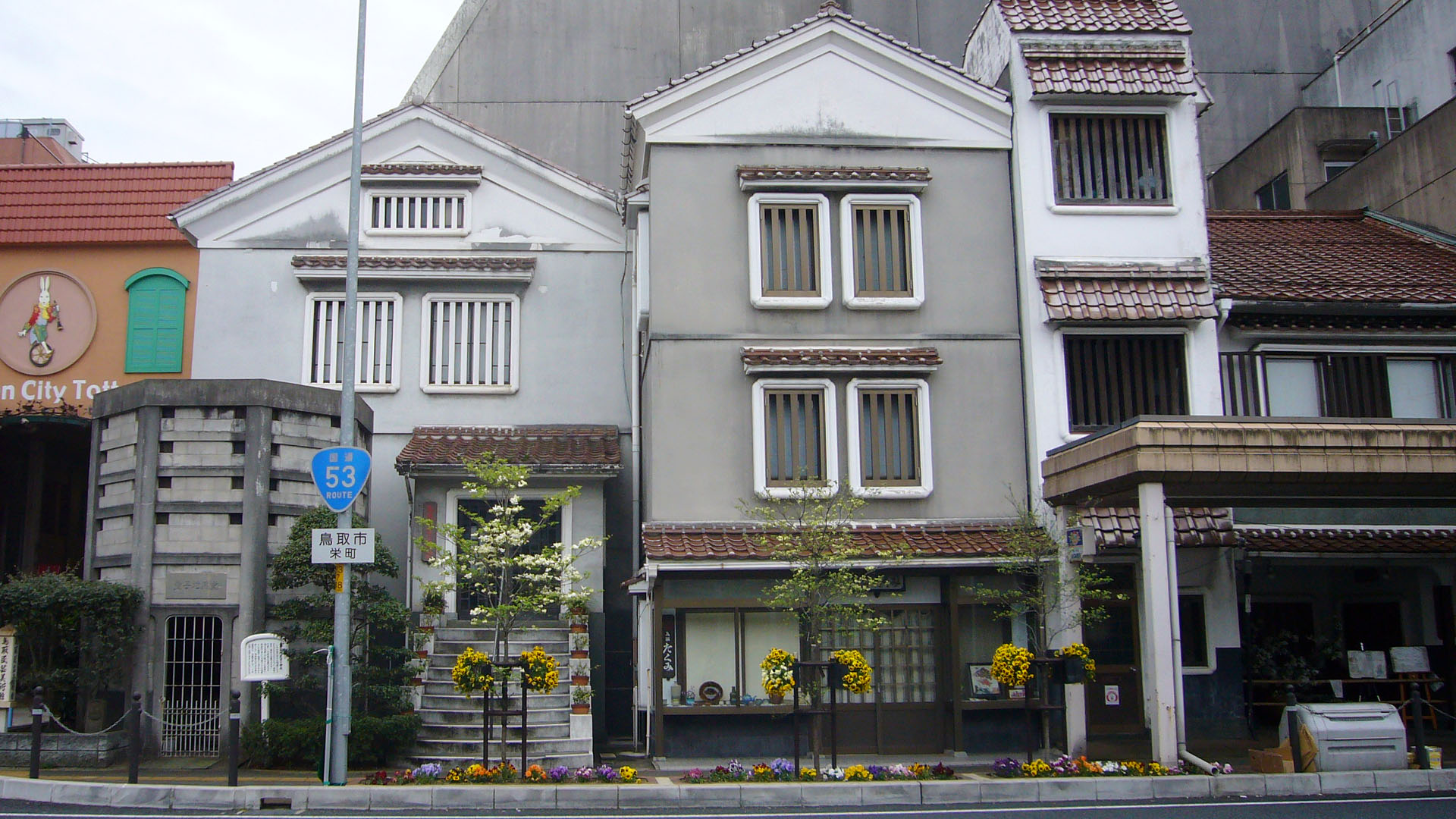
- Interactive map of the Tottori Folk Crafts Museum area

General information
- Location: 651, Sakae-machi, Tottori, Tottori Prefecture, Japan
- Coordinates: 35°29′46″N 134°13′38″E
- Opened: 1949

The Tottori Folk Crafts Museum (鳥取民芸美術館, Tottori Mingei Bijutsukan) opened in Tottori, Japan, in 1949. It was established as the Tottori Mingeikan by Yoshida Shōya (吉田璋也), local advocate of the mingei folk craft movement, who formed a craft guild in 1931 and opened the craft shop "Takumi" in the city the following year. In 1933, Yoshida opened a shop by the same name in Tokyo's Ginza district. Both shops are still in operation as of 2023. The building in which the Tottori museum is housed was designated a Registered Tangible Cultural Property in 2012.

== See also ==
- Japanese Folk Crafts Museum
- Folk Cultural Properties
- Japanese craft
