= Archer Historical Society Museum =

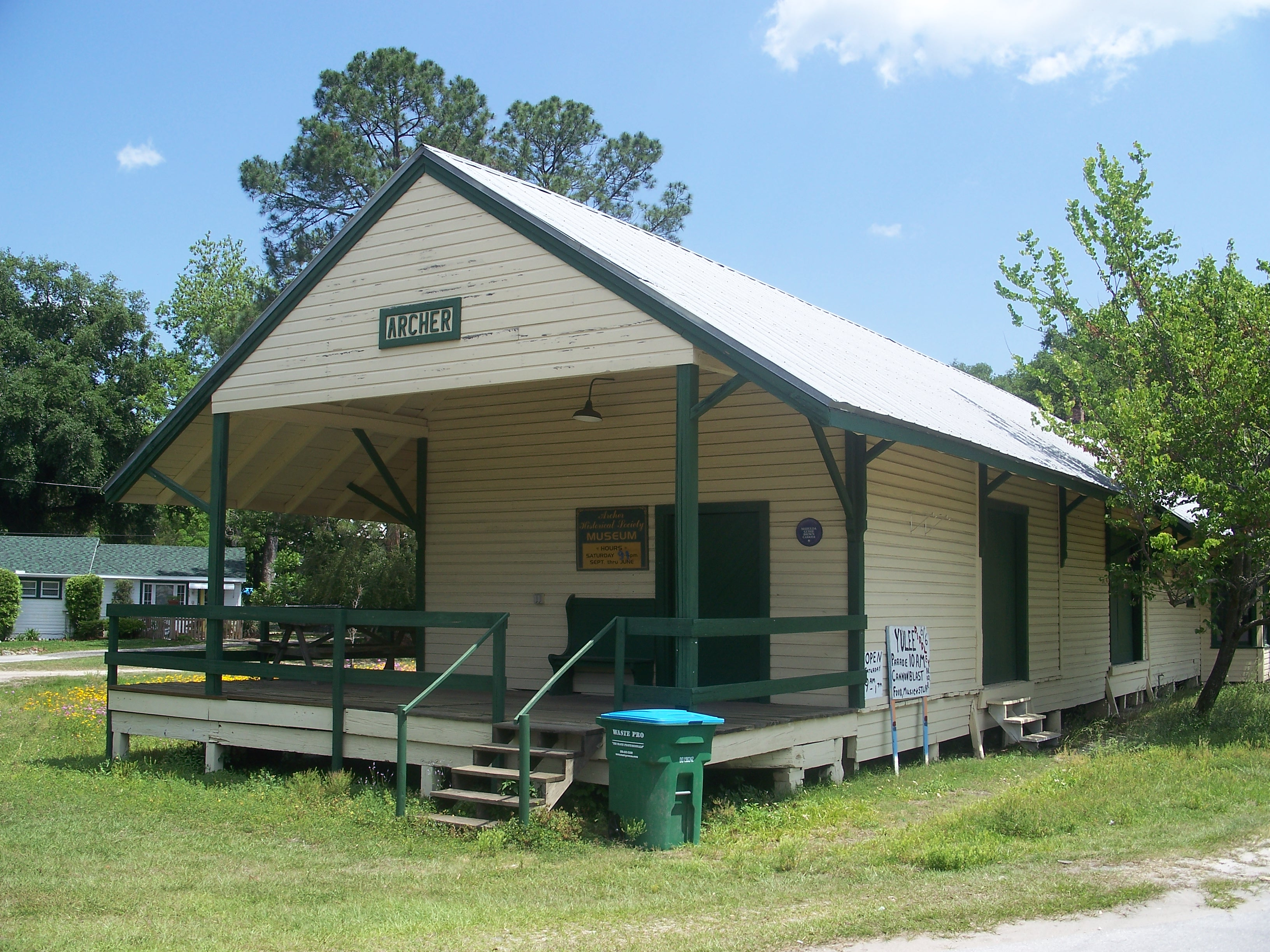

- Location within Florida
- Location: Intersection of Main and Magnolia Streets; Archer, Florida
- Coordinates: 29.53149°N 82.52273°W
- Type: History museum
- Website: Archer Historical Society Museum

The Archer Historical Society Museum is located at the intersection of Main and Magnolia Streets, Archer, Florida, United States. Housed in an old railroad depot that was built before 1900, it contains exhibits relating to area history. The society secured ownership of the depot building in 1984 and annual fairs were used to raise money for its restoration.
