= Sitka Historical Museum =

City museum of Sitka, Alaska, U.S.

Coordinates: 57°3′1″N 135°20′56″W

The Sitka History Museum, formerly known as the Isabel Miller Museum is the city museum of Sitka in the U.S. state of Alaska.

The Sitka Historical Society & Museum was founded in 1957. Their collections didn't have a dedicated space until 1967, when the museum opened in Harrigan Centennial Hall. In 2015 the Harrigan Centennial Hall was closed for renovations, with the museum reopening in 2018.

Its collection focuses on Sitka's history from the Tlingit people, through the European explorations and Russian era and after. The museum also has extensive collections and archives not on display, accessible by staff for research purposes.
