= Pantego Academy Historical Museum =

Historic school building in North Carolina, United States

Coordinates: 35.590516°N 76.662261°W

Pantego Academy Historic Museum or Ye Olde Academy is a museum in an old academy in Pantego, North Carolina that has ceased operations. It was registered as a National Historic Place on October 25, 1984.
