= Polk County Historical Museum =

Polk County Historical Museum may refer to:

- Polk County Historical Museum (Florida) in Bartow
- Polk County Historical Museum (Wisconsin) in Balsam Lake
