= Jeffersontown Historical Museum =

Museum in Jeffersontown, Kentucky, United States

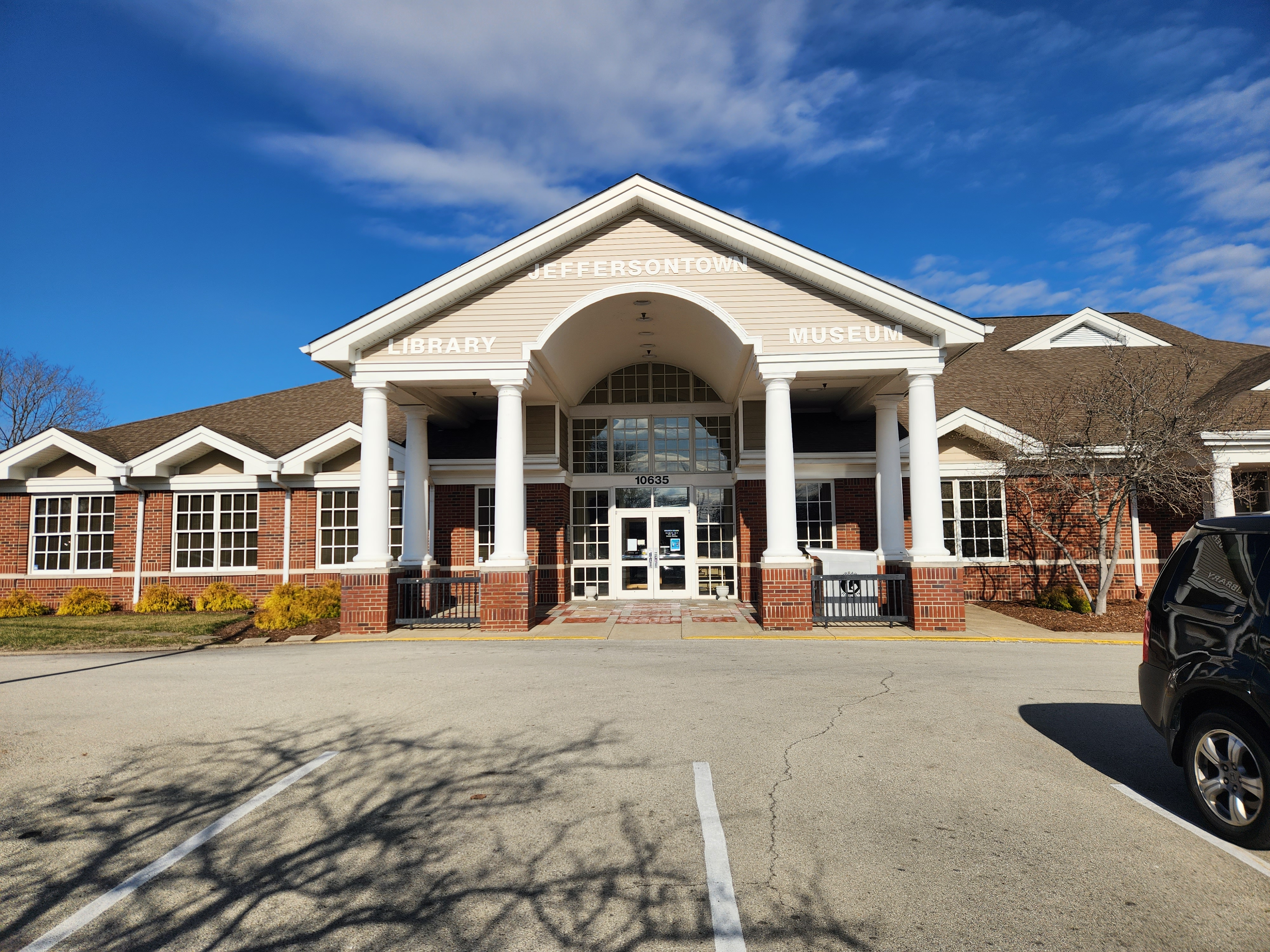
- Entrance to the museum facility
- Established: 1972
- Location: 10635 Watterson Trail; Jeffersontown, Kentucky 40299-3750
- Coordinates: 38.198°N 85.561°W
- Type: History
- Director: Beth Wilder
- Public transit access: TARC (Route 40)
- Parking: On site (no charge)
- Website: www.jeffersontownky.com/122/Museum

The Jeffersontown Historical Museum is a neighborhood history museum in Jeffersontown, Kentucky. It details the history of Jeffersontown as it progressed from a small rural community with a town square to the city that it is today.

== History ==
The original museum was established in 1972 as a collection of artifacts in a room of City Hall. The following year, the Jeffersontown and Southeastern Jefferson County Historical Society was formed and became the curators of the museum. The society also worked to obtain artifacts and documents for display. The original museum remained open until 1982 when it was closed in response to artifacts being stolen. All remaining items where then stored in the basement of city hall and the society was disbanded.

The museum was reopened in 1996 inside the Jeffersontown Library building under the direction of the City of Jeffersontown. In response to rapid growth the museum was renovated in 1997 and again in 2000 in order to accommodate new exhibits. In 2011 at the request of city council the museum began digitizing parts of its collection so that it would be available online.

== Exhibits ==
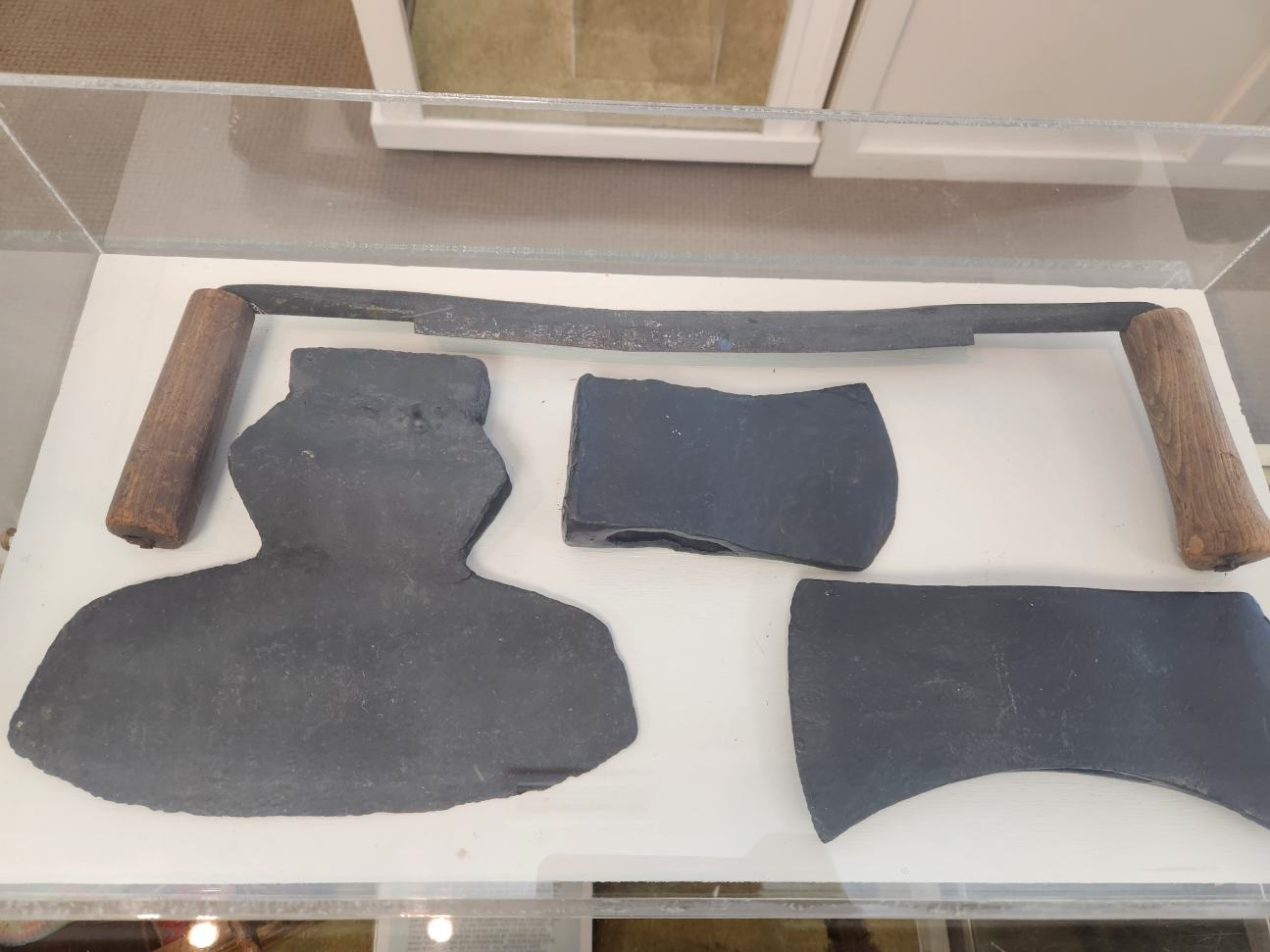
Woodworking tools used to build log cabins

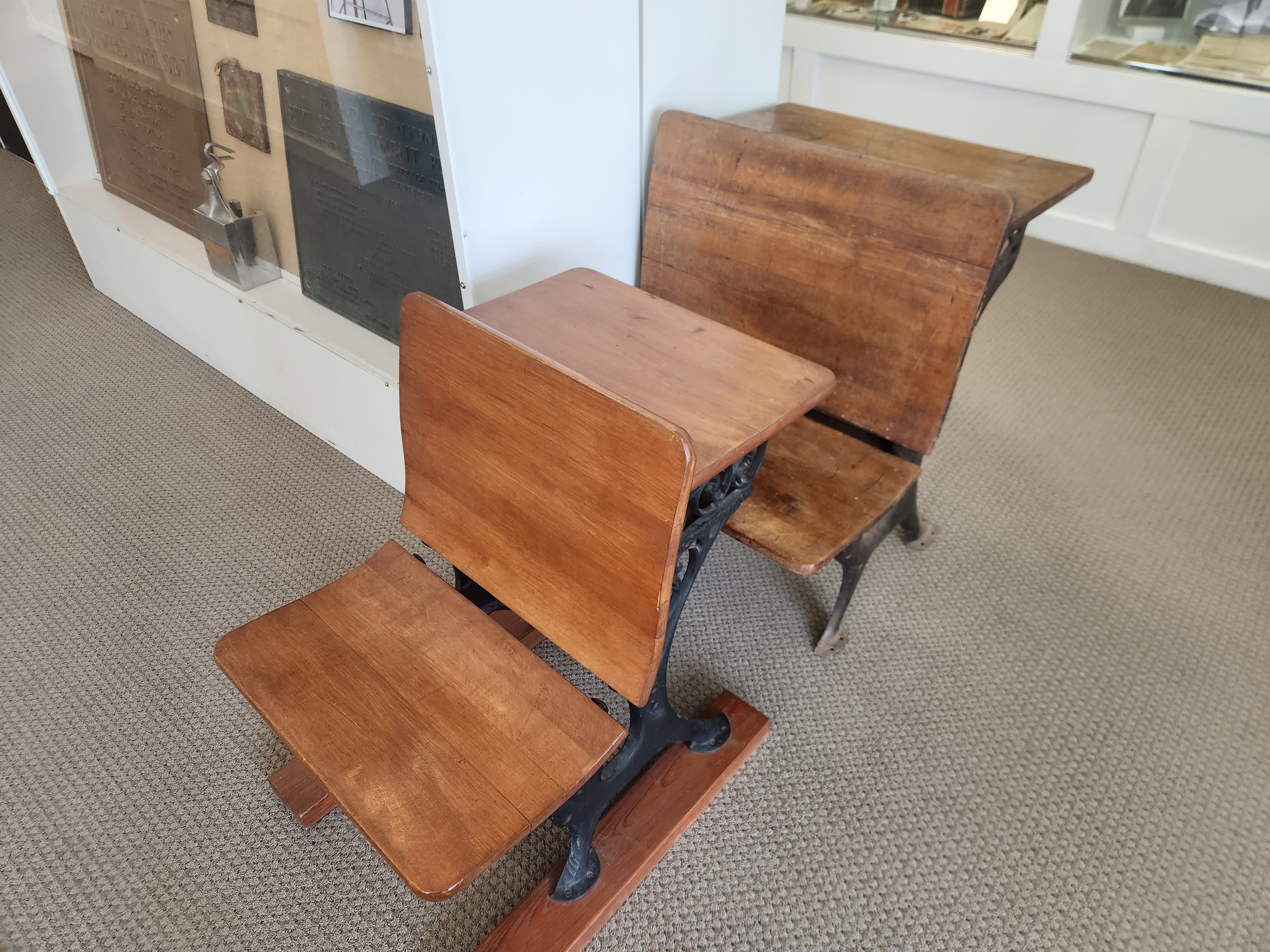
School desks at the Jeffersontown Historical Museum

On display are photographs, textiles, rare books, and costumes once owned by residents of Jeffersontown all the way from the city's founding families to current residents. The museum also boasts a large "Dolls of the World" doll collection that was donated by a former resident. The collection has over 1,250 dolls, many of which are hundreds of years old and is one of the largest such collections in the Midwestern United States. It also has artifacts from the city's past such as an enamel sign from the old Jeffersontown passenger train depot as well as copies of the Jeffersonian.

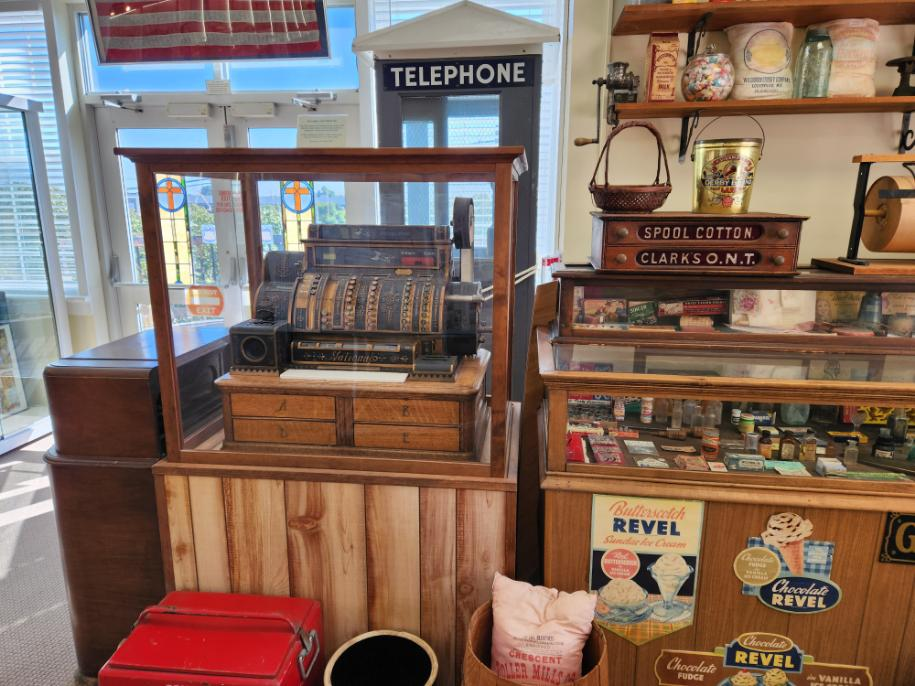
Cash register and replica store front

The museum also has a rotating exhibit that changes approximately every six months. Such exhibits have included a collection of bridal gowns, Beatles memorabilia, Conrad Pottery, and a collection of Archie Comics memorabilia.

== See also ==
- List of museums in the Louisville metropolitan area
- List of attractions and events in the Louisville metropolitan area
