= Michaelsberg Abbey, Bamberg =

Former Benedictine monastery in Bamberg, Bavaria, Germany

Michaelsberg Abbey
- Kloster Michaelsberg
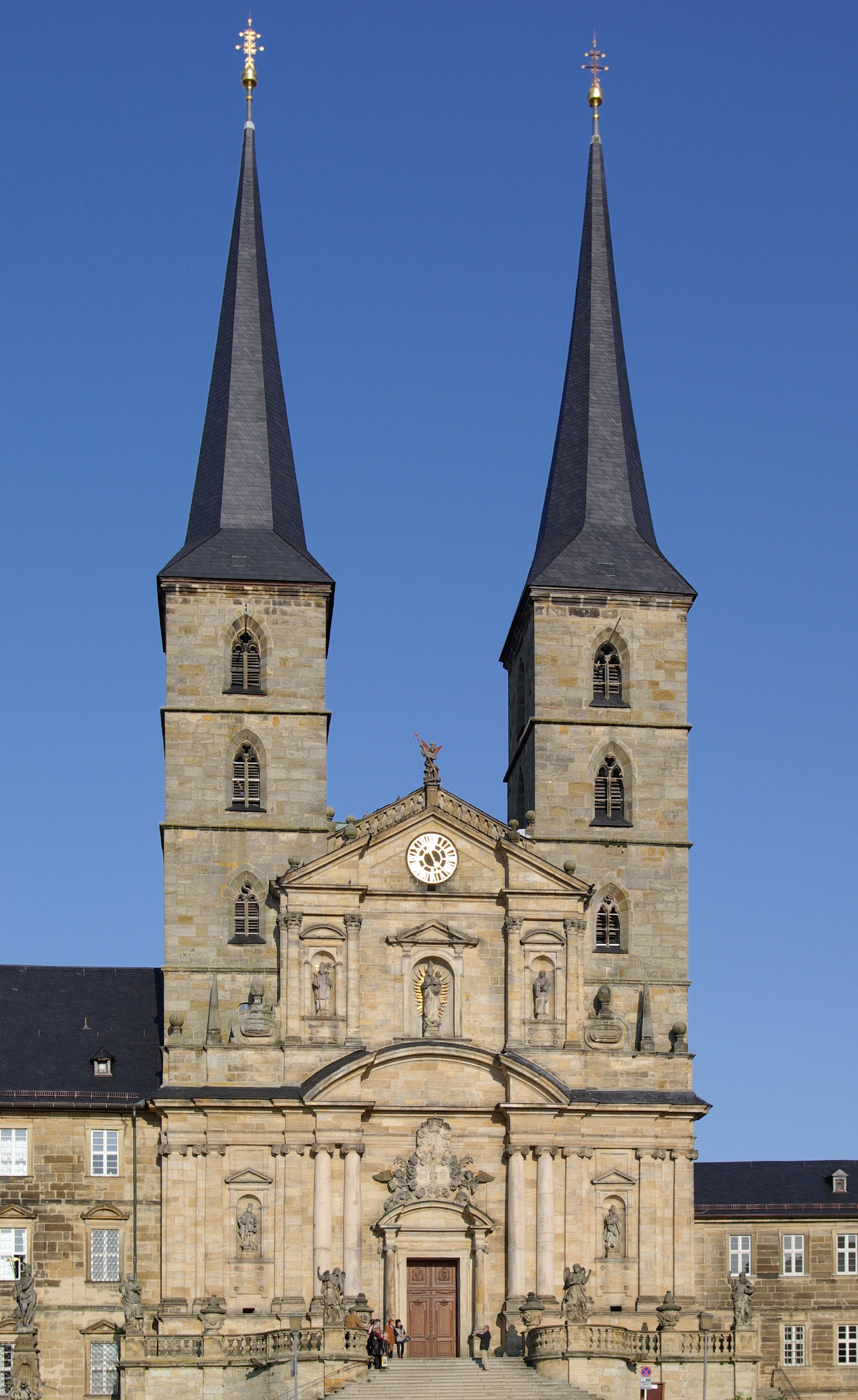
- West front of the Michaelskirche, the former abbey church

- Location within Bavaria Location within Germany

Monastery information
- Other name: Kloster Michelsberg
- Order: Benedictine
- Established: 1015
- Disestablished: 1802/3

Site
- Location: Bamberg
- Coordinates: 49°53′37″N 10°52′38″E

UNESCO World Heritage Site
- Type: Cultural
- Criteria: ii, iv
- Designated: 1993 (17th session)
- Reference no.: 624
- Region: Europe and North America

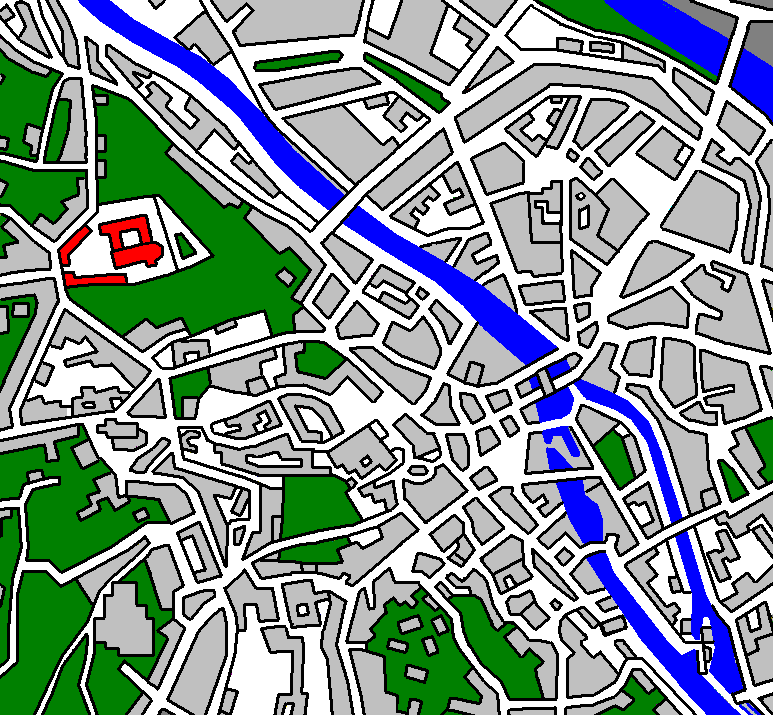
Position of the abbey in the Bamberg old town

Michaelsberg Abbey or Michelsberg Abbey, also St. Michael's Abbey, Bamberg (German: Kloster Michaelsberg or Michelsberg) is a former Benedictine monastery in Bamberg in Bavaria, Germany. After its dissolution in 1803 the buildings were used for the almshouse Vereinigtes Katharinen- und Elisabethen-Spital, which is still there as a retirement home. The former abbey church remains in use as the Michaelskirche.

The buildings are part of the UNESCO World Heritage Site "Town of Bamberg". As of 2016 and for the foreseeable future, the church is closed for repairs.

== Location ==
The abbey gave its name to the Michaelsberg, one of the hills of Bamberg, overlooking the town. With Bamberg Cathedral and the monasteries of St. Stephan and St. Gangolf it formed part of a T-shaped cross in Bamberg's topography.

The hill is the most prominent spur of the Steigerwald in the municipal area and with its steep eastern decline towards the Regnitz is significantly higher than the Domberg. This contributes to the dominant effect of the abbey buildings.

== History ==
=== Establishment of the abbey ===
The hill was inhabited before the abbey was founded. Excavations have uncovered massive walls and a moat from the 10th century.

After the creation of the Bishopric of Bamberg by King (and later Emperor) Heinrich II (Henry II), the first Bishop of Bamberg, Eberhard I, founded the abbey in 1015 as the bishop's private monastery. Accordingly, the abbot answered directly and exclusively to the bishop of Bamberg. The monks for the new establishment were drawn from Amorbach Abbey and Fulda Abbey.

=== History in the Middle Ages ===
Heinrich supported the abbey with rich gifts, including properties. Three books with which the abbey was initially endowed are still in the Staatsbibliothek Bamberg. The abbey followed the Hirsau Reforms, which also resulted in the building of a new church. The chronicler and author Frutolf of Michelsberg was prior here until his death in 1103. The abbey flourished under Bishop Otto (d. 1139), whose burial in the abbey church and subsequent canonisation in 1189, together with the papal protection granted to the abbey in 1251, was of enormous advantage in increasing the independence of the abbey from the bishops. Under abbot Wolfram (d. 1123), appointed by Otto, the number of monks on the Michaelsberg reached its all-time high of 70 (from 20 under his predecessor). The award to the abbots of the pontificalia had taken place some time before 1185. After Otto's canonization he became a patron of the abbey, together with St. Michael. Until the 18th century, the abbey continued to fight the Hochstift in various legal battles, trying to achieve the status of Imperial Abbey. A document from Heinrich (dated 1017) states that Eberhard had founded the abbey, and that it was a private or proprietary abbey. However, from the 12th century on, the abbey's chroniclers tried to label Heinrich (and later also his wife Kunigunde) as the true founder(s), in order to reduce the influence of the bishop. The abbey's financial status rested securely upon its great ownership of lands in the bishopric, eventually extending to 441 towns and villages. It became one of the culturally most important Benedictine abbeys in southern Germany, with its scriptorium being especially famed.

=== Modern history ===
A decline set in around 1420, resulting in reform attempts. In 1430, the Hussites sacked the abbey. In 1435, the abbey came into conflict with the townspeople of Bamberg and was plundered. In 1446 the abbey's debt had grown so large, that the bishop, Anton von Rotenhan (1431–59) deposed the abbot Johannes I. Fuchs and took control of the abbey directly. A thorough reform only came under bishop Georg I. von Schaumberg (1459–75), who appointed Eberhard von Venlo (died 1475) as abbot in 1463. He had come with some other monks from the monastery of St. Jakob near Mainz, a member of the Bursfelde Congregation. Michaelsberg joined this reform movement in 1467. Building activity surged: the guest house was built and the dormitory expanded. Changes were also made to the church. Abbot Andreas Lang (died 1503) had an inventory of all the abbey's possessions created and the abbey flourished under his rule. The abbey once again suffered during the German Peasants' War of 1525, and during the Franconian Margrave War (Markgräflerkrieg) in 1553. A period of recovery followed under abbot Veit I. Finger (died 1585).

In the Thirty Years' War the abbey was occupied for several years by the Swedish army. In the 17th and 18th centuries the abbey recovered, and enjoyed a new period of prosperity in the early 18th century, notably under abbot Christoph Ernst von Guttenberg (died 1725). He managed to restore the abbey to sound financial health, laying the groundwork for the building that followed. Michaelsberg was in competition with both other abbeys that were being rebuilt in Baroque style (Langheim Abbey from 1681, Ebrach Abbey from 1687 and Banz Abbey from 1697) and the bishop who in 1695 had begun to expand his residence on the opposite hill.

The agricultural buildings (Wirtschaftsgebäude) were added in several waves: after 1696 by Leonhard Dientzenhofer and from 1708 by his brother Johann. These significantly increased the size of the abbey and gave it its fortress-like look.

Abbot Anselm Geisendorfer came into confrontation with his bishop, Friedrich Karl von Schönborn and after additional conflict with his monks left the abbey in June 1740. In 1743 he was deposed. However, besides his work on the church (see below), Anselm was able to start a rebuilding of the Wirtschaftsgebäude, to which Balthasar Neumann contributed after 1742 and which his successor as abbot, Ludwig Dietz (died 1759), finished in 1744. In terms of construction, Ludwig and his successor, Gallus Brockard (died 1799), mostly focused on the park created on the terraces around the abbey. In the latter half of the 18th century, the financial situation of the abbey had deteriorated significantly as a result of mismanagement, the Seven Years' War and then the French Revolutionary Wars. Attempts at reform by the final abbot, Cajetan Rost (died 1804), were cut short by the abbey's dissolution.

=== Dissolution of the abbey ===
By the time of the secularisation of Bavaria of 1802 the abbey still owned substantial property in Bamberg itself as well as estates in no fewer than 141 places in the surrounding area. On 30 November 1802 Bavarian troops confiscated the abbey's assets. Valuable books were removed to the library of the Bavarian court, the predecessor of the present Bayerische Staatsbibliothek.

Even before that seizure, in September 1802, the Bavarian government followed a suggestion by Friedrich Adalbert Marcus, the head of the hospital Vereinigtes Katharinen- und Elisabethenspital (St. Katharina and St. Elisabeth), to transfer the institution to the hill from the town centre, preventing the abbey buildings from being demolished.

On 13 April 1803 the abbey was dissolved. The 21 monks then resident were obliged to leave. In 1808, the hospital became the formal owner of the buildings, but in 1817 the town took over. The abbey still houses the municipal retirement home Bürgerspital. From 1880 until 2002, facility management of the hospital was assigned to the Sisters of Charity of St. Vincent de Paul.

== Description ==
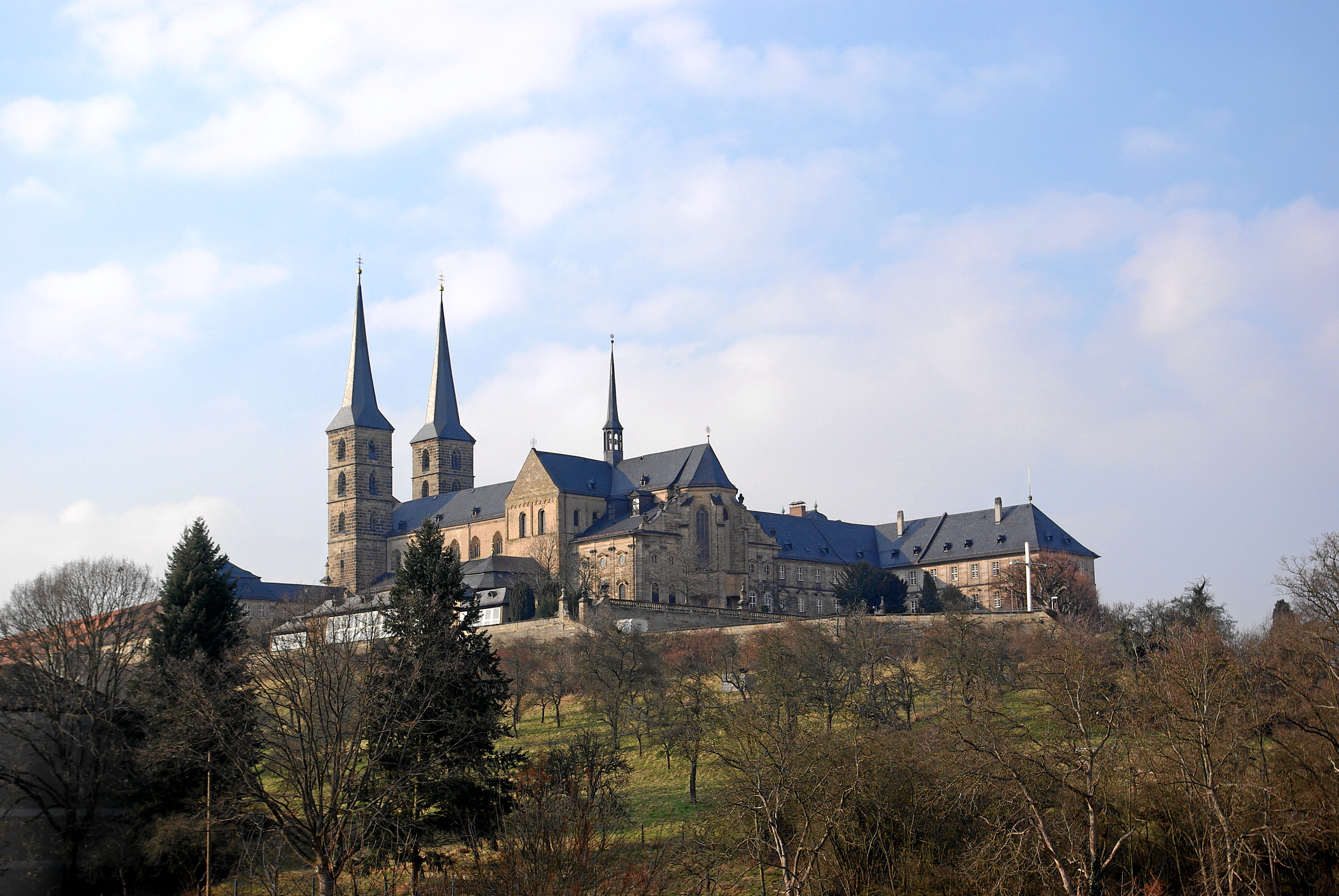
View of Michaelsberg from the Rose Garden of the New Residence

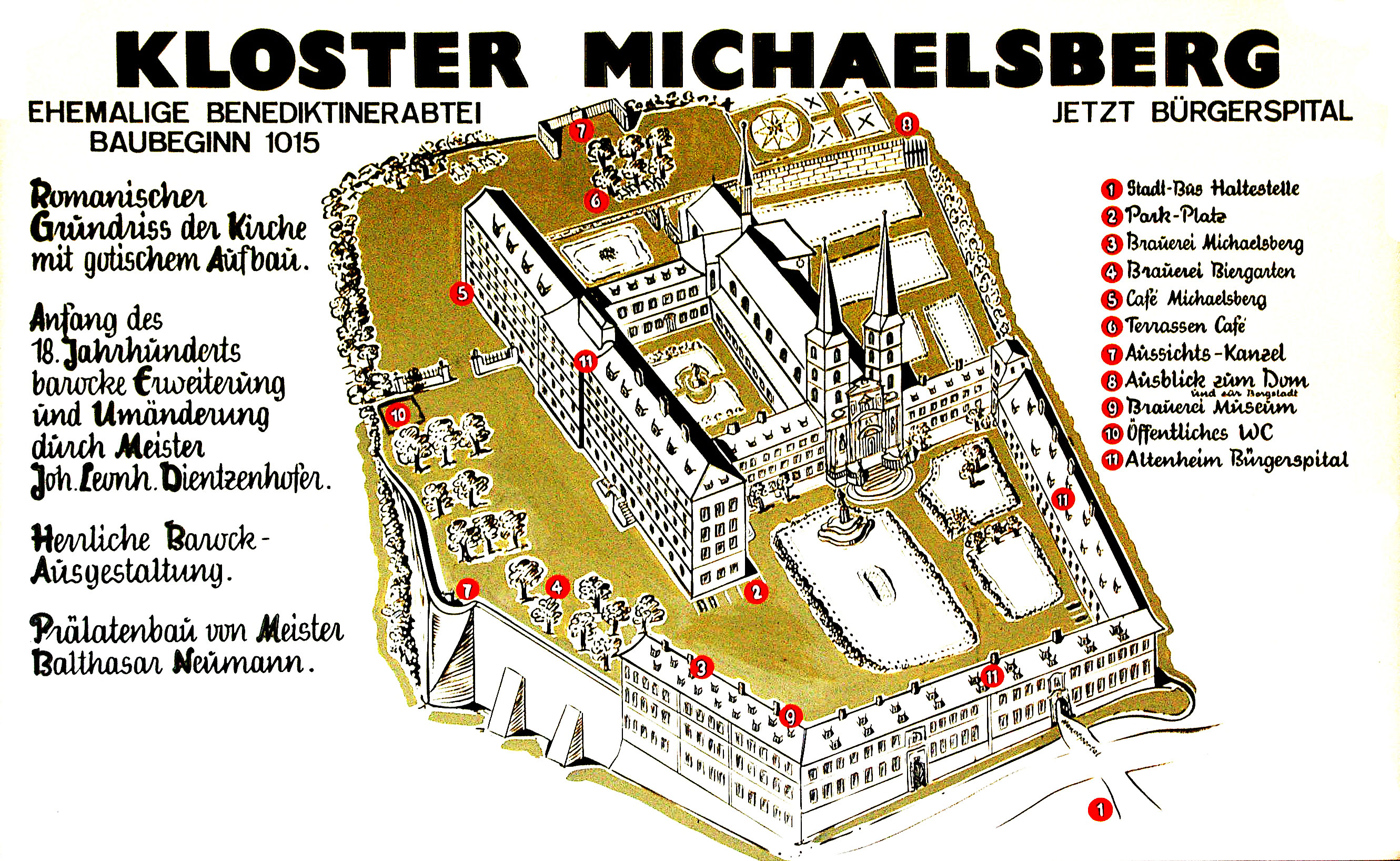
Sketch plan of the abbey precinct

Due to its exposed location on top of the hill, the former abbey buildings are visible from many places in Bamberg. The structures enhance the impact on the viewer by their bulk. The Wirtschaftsgebäude and living quarters built during the Baroque period from massive sandstone surround the substantial two-spired church. In turn they are enveloped by the terrace gardens which surround the abbey on three sides. The palace-like three-storied main wing faces north, towards the Main.

=== Abbey church ===
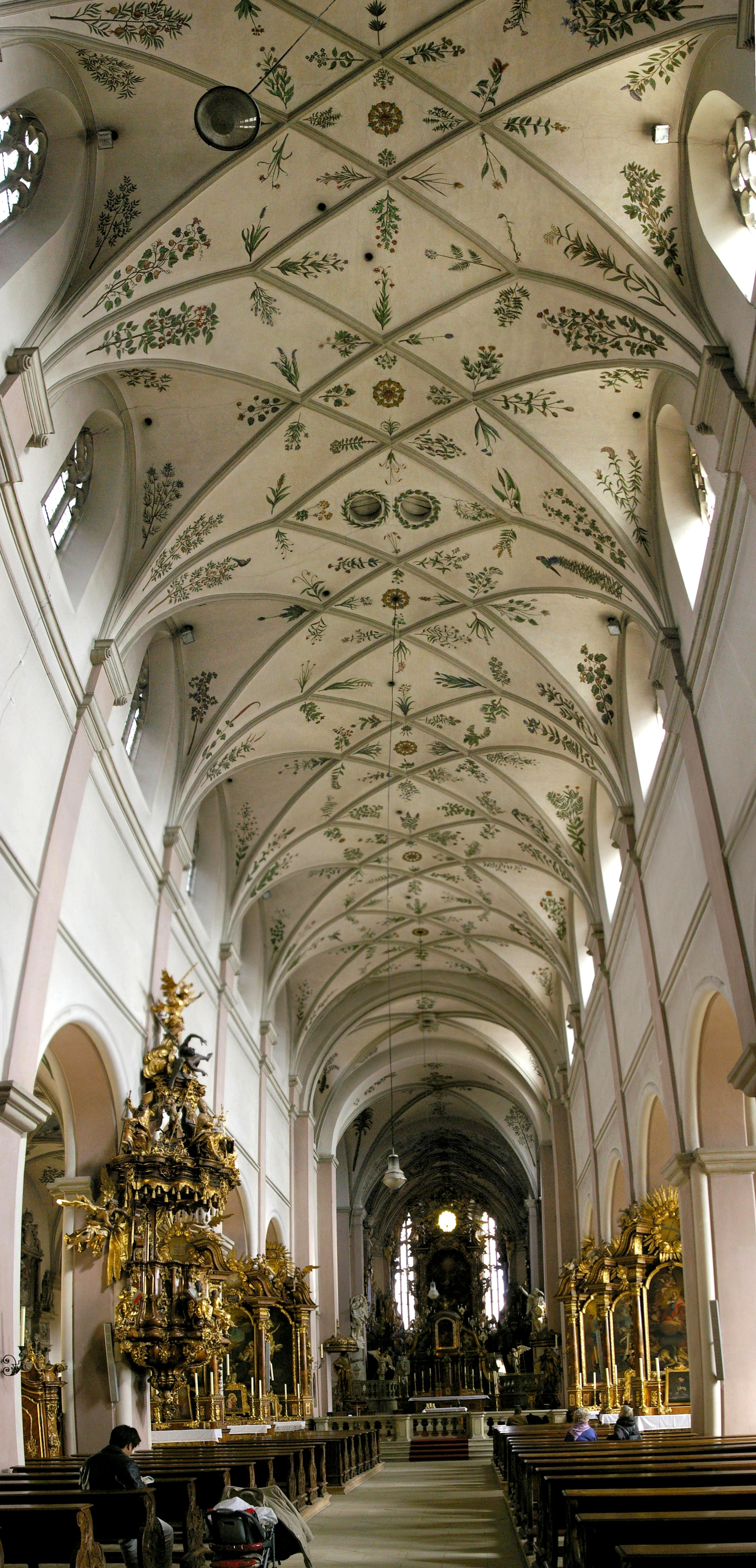
Nave of the former abbey church

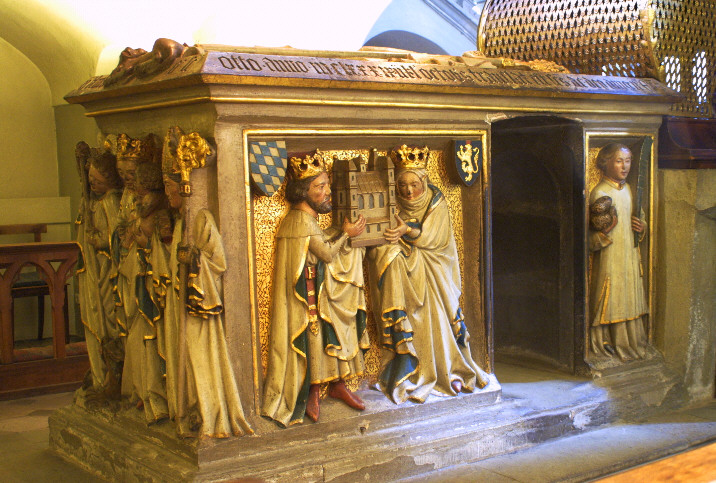
Gothic tomb of St. Otto in the crypt

The first church on the site, dedicated to Saint Michael, was built from about 1015 and was consecrated on 2 November 1021 by Eberhard, in the presence of the archbishops Aribo and Pilgrim, Emperor Heinrich and a large share of the rulers of the Holy Roman Empire, both secular and ecclesial. Not much is known about the size and structure of the initial buildings. An earthquake on 3 January 1117 apparently only slightly damaged the church, but Bishop Otto had the whole building (and the monastery) torn down and rebuilt on a larger scale by one Richolf, in accordance with the architectural concepts of the Hirsau Reforms. The new (and current) building, basically a Romanesque church, was consecrated on 1 September 1121.

After his death Bishop Otto was buried on 3 July 1139 in a tomb in the nave, in front of the altar dedicated to St. Michael. In 1287/8 a polychrome sculpture was created as a tomb figure, showing Otto with pallium, mitre, staff and book. Today it stands against the wall of the crypt. The current tomb was made (also polychrome) around 1435/40.

On 27 April 1610, work on the roof resulted in a fire which destroyed all the roofs and the nave, but the tomb of Otto was virtually unaffected. Under abbot Johann V. Müller (died 1627) the rebuilding in Renaissance style started immediately. By October, the choir had a new roof and by 1614 the westworks with the two repaired towers had been finished. Reconstruction of the nave followed, and its ceiling was painted with the Garden of Heaven; bells, organ and choir stalls were bought. The new church was consecrated in 1617.

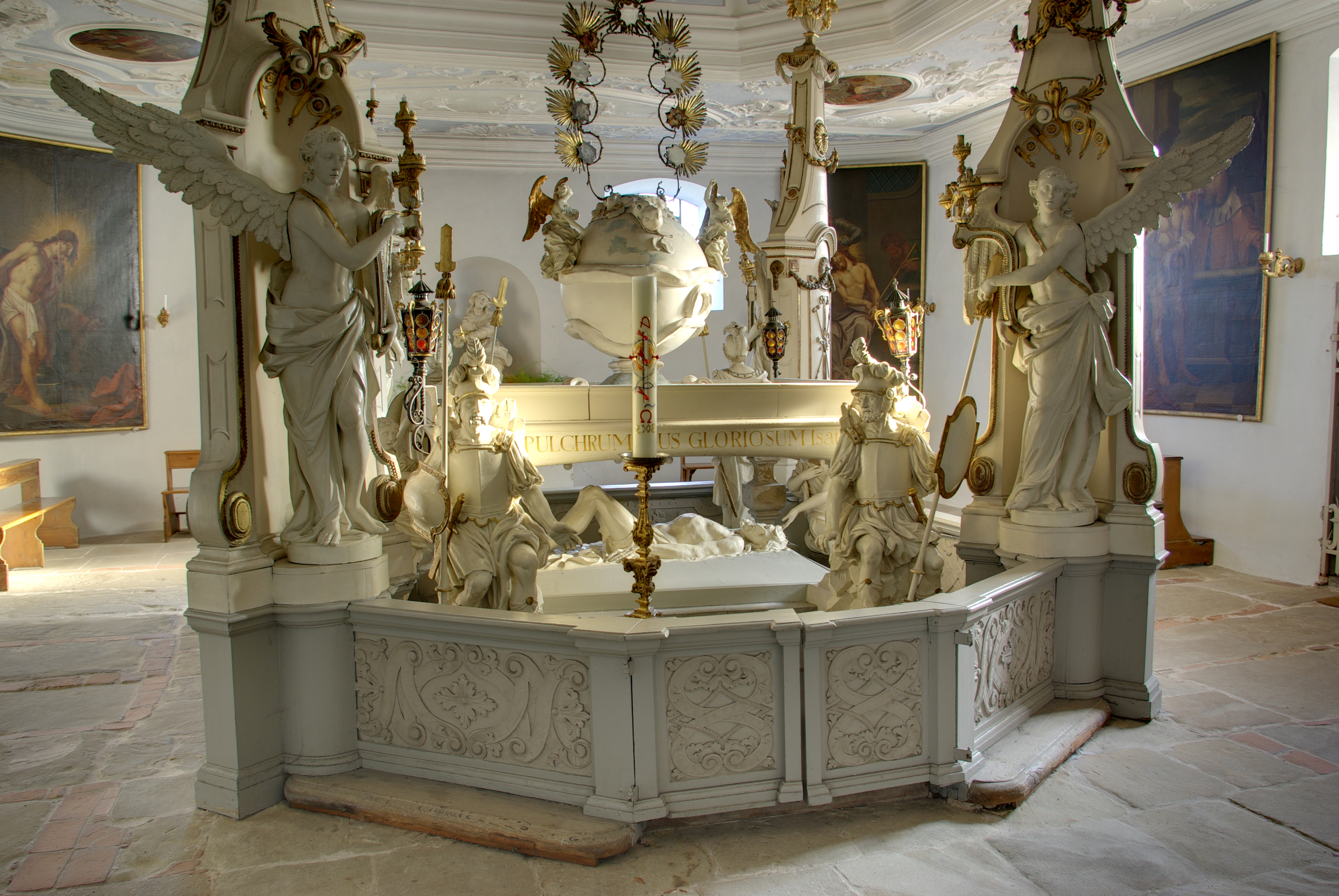
The Neoclassical Holy Sepulchre

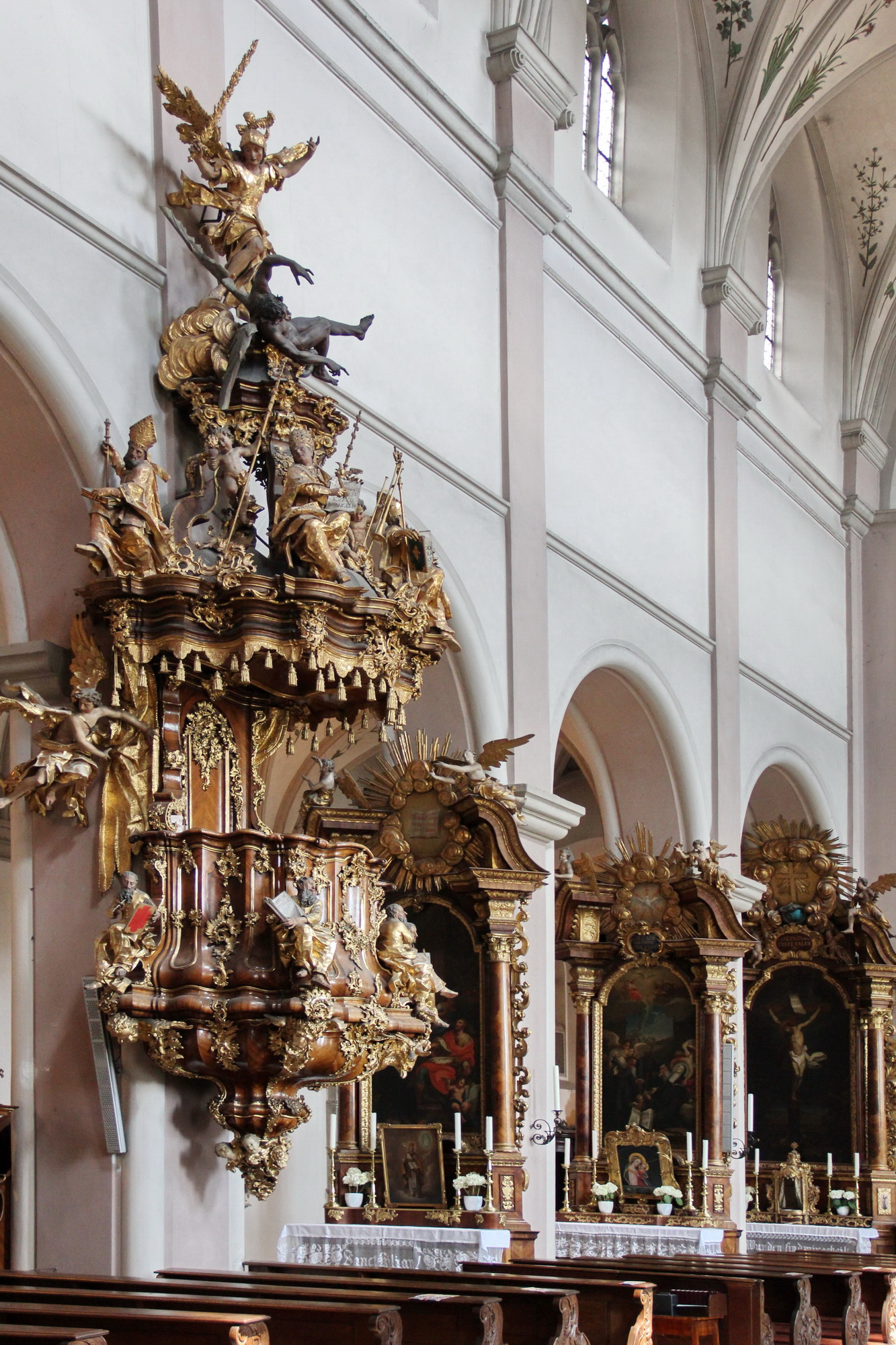
Rococo pulpit

The still-extant organ-loft was also constructed very soon after the fire, in 1610, and is a significant work of German late Renaissance art. From 1696 Leonhard Dientzenhofer, under the instructions of abbot Christoph Ernst von Guttenberg, created a two-storey Baroque exterior façade. It was finished by August 1700. The large exterior stairway followed in 1722/3. Johann Dientzenhofer built the terrace and the high choir after 1725, under abbot Anselm Geisendorfer. This created the crypt in which the tomb of Saint Otto is situated today. To the left and right of the choir, the Romanesque apses were replaced by two-storied structures. Under Anselm the church interior was mostly replaced: a new high altar, two choir stalls, an altar was added to the crossing and two to the transepts. Six altars were added to the side-aisles and three galleries were built. Under his rule the church largely took on its current appearance. A replica Holy Sepulchre in a side chapel that already reflects early Neoclassical style was also ordered by Anselm. Georg Adam Reuß later made the pulpit in Rococo style, the final important piece of art added to the abbey church.

In 1833, the colorful painting of façade and statuary on the stair was removed and in 1837 on the orders of King Ludwig I of Bavaria, ten gravestones and memorials of the bishops of Bamberg from the 16th to the 18th century were removed from Bamberg Cathedral and set up in the Michaelskirche, as described in a guidebook of 1912:

"An entirely alien component of the church furnishings consists of those episcopal gravestones which Ludwig I ordered to be removed from the cathedral during its restoration, as stylistically inappropriate, and which were set up in the Michelskirche instead."

In 1886, Georg Dengler, Domvikar at Regensburg Cathedral developed a plan for "purifying" the interior of the church, but the replacement of the Baroque style elements with Romanesque Revival and the painting over of the botanical ceiling frescoes were prevented by popular protests and the intervention of Friedrich Schneider, Domkapitular at Mainz Cathedral.

In 1952, the interior of the church was renovated. Work on the towers followed in 1985-7 and on the Holy Sepulchre 1985–96. In 2002, repair work on all the church roofs was completed.

== Today ==
The former abbey church of Saint Michael is now an ancillary church to the cathedral. Since 1993, the area has been part of a UNESCO World Heritage Site.

The church, gardens and areas not used by the Spital used to be open to the public. However, due to structural integrity issues, the church has been closed since 2012. Work on what is expected to be a €50 million restoration began in the spring of 2016. This is expected to be finished in 2021 at the earliest.

== Notable people ==
- Ebo of Michelsberg (died 1163), German monk known for some writings
- Herbord of Michelsberg (died 1168), German monk known for some writings

== See also ==
- Historical Museum Bamberg
