= Dromana Historical Museum =

- Location: Old Shire Offices, 359a Point Nepean Road, Dromana, Victoria, Australia
- Coordinates: 38.3363°S 144.9578°E
- Type: History museum
- Website: http://avoca.vicnet.net.au/~dromana/

Dromana Historical Museum is a museum located in Dromana, Victoria, Australia. The museum is run by volunteers of the Dromana and District Historical Society dedicated to preserving the history of Dromana and the surrounding areas of Red Hill, Rosebud, McCrae, Main Ridge, Boneo, and Red Hill South.

== Collections ==
The museum collects old photographs, cards, ephemera, letters, and other material relevant to the area. They have a collection of around 3000 historical photographs documenting the establishment of the Mornington Peninsula area, including transport, farming, leisure, and schools. In February 2018 the museum was ransacked, with the thieves stealing important historical photos and WW1 medals.

== Exhibitions ==
In 2015 the museum developed a plan to revitalise their exhibition area in order to attract new members. The result of this was the permanent contemporary exhibition Dromana the Delightful which has caught attention from other historical societies wishing to do the same.
