= West Franklin Historical Museum =

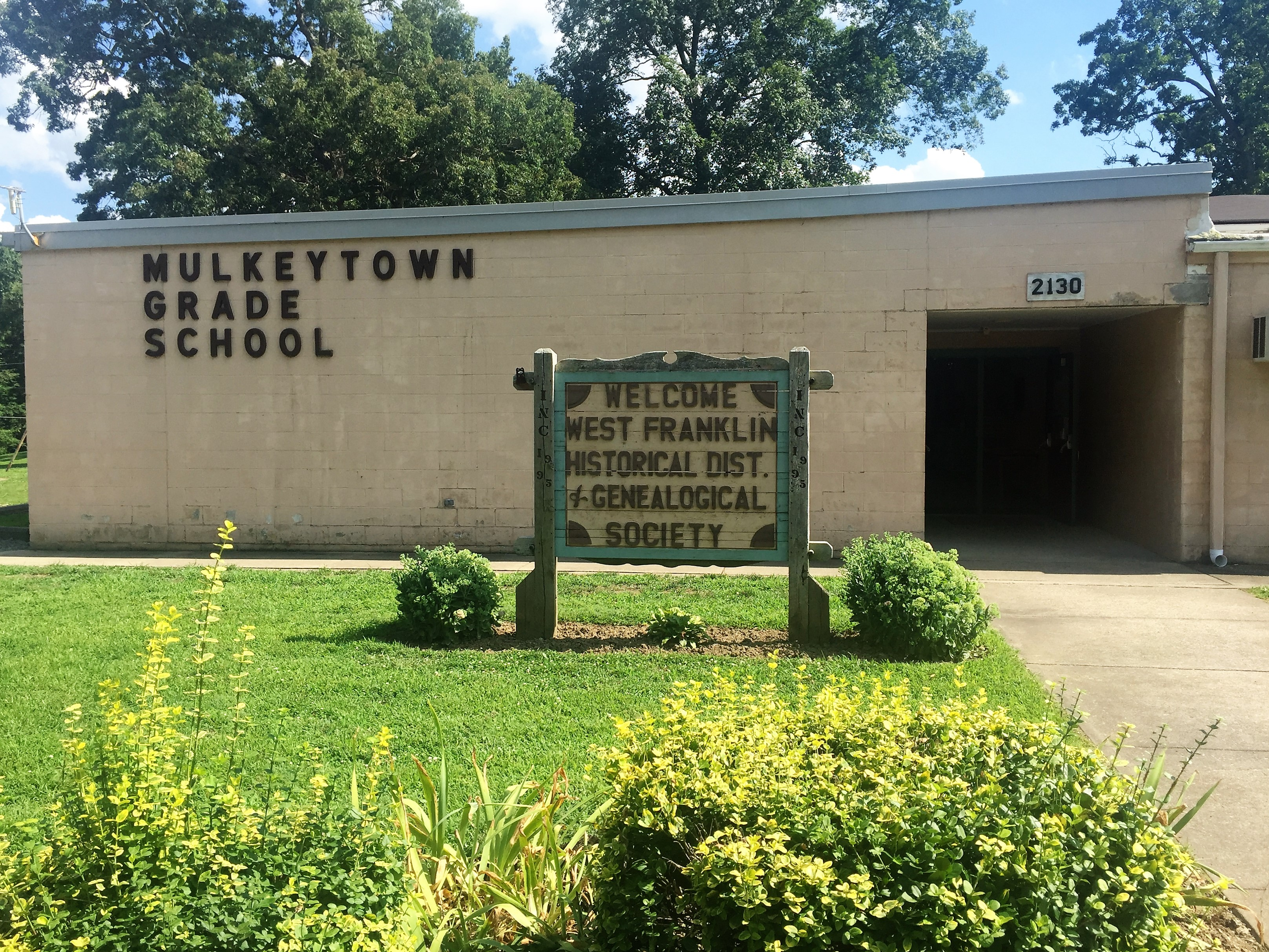

- Location of Museum in Illinois
- Location: 2130 Schoolhouse Road; Mulkeytown, Illinois, United States
- Coordinates: 37.968333°N 89.112654°W
- Type: History museum
- Owners: West Franklin Historical District & Genealogical Society

The West Franklin Historical Museum is operated by the West Franklin Historical District & Genealogical Society in Mulkeytown, Illinois.

Its primary purpose is the preserve and protect the cultural heritage of the people, places and events of Western Franklin County, Illinois.

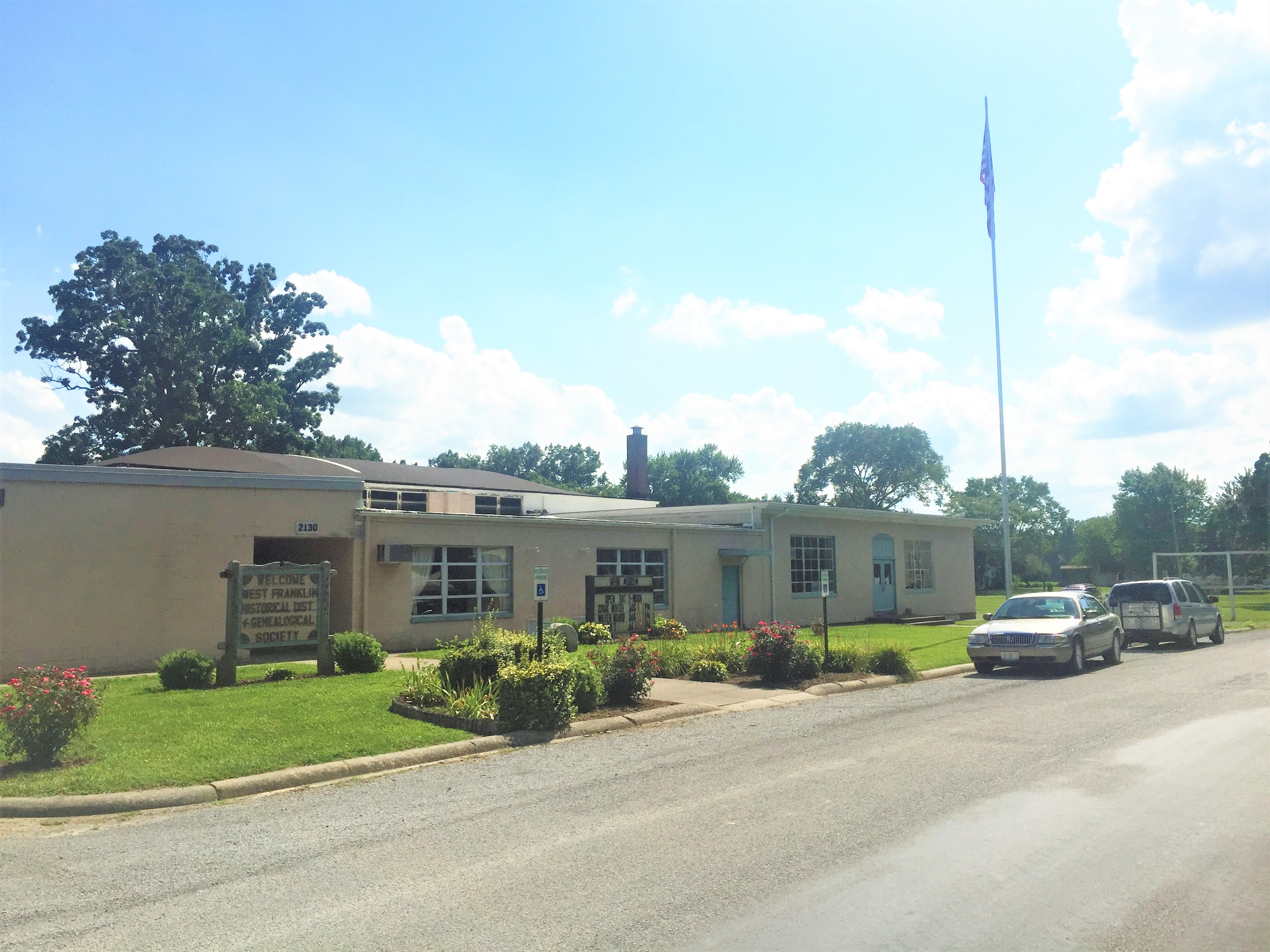
Home of the West Franklin Historical District and Genealogical Society, and former home of the Mulkeytown Grade School.

== Collections ==
The museum consists of a collection of artifacts and memorabilia donations and loans, including accessions from cities, towns and villages, families and schools located in the Western Franklin County region.

Many of the communities, locations, people and families curated in the museum date to a time before Illinois attained statehood.
