= Historical and Folklore Museum of Corinth =

Museum in Corinth, Greece

Coordinates: 37°56′24.9″N 22°56′6.3″E

The Historical and Folklore Museum of Corinth is a museum in Corinth, Greece.
