= Prince Albert Historical Museum =

Coordinates: 53.2060°N 105.7544°W

Prince Albert Historical Society Museum
- Former name: Prince Albert Heritage Museum
- Established: 1977
- Location: Prince Albert, Saskatchewan, Canada
- Type: Municipal museum
- Website: historypa.com

The Prince Albert Historical Museum is operated by the Prince Albert Historical Society in Prince Albert, Saskatchewan, Canada. It exhibits the history of the area in the city's first firehall which was constructed in 1912 and operated until 1975. In 1977, the museum opened in the space. On display are various First Nations artefacts, an old fire truck, a firemen's pole, and a Native Dugout Canoe (believed to be a thousand years old). The Prince Albert Historical Museum also houses the city's archives.

== Affiliations ==
The Museum is affiliated with: CMA, CHIN, and Virtual Museum of Canada.
