= Saint John Jewish Historical Museum =

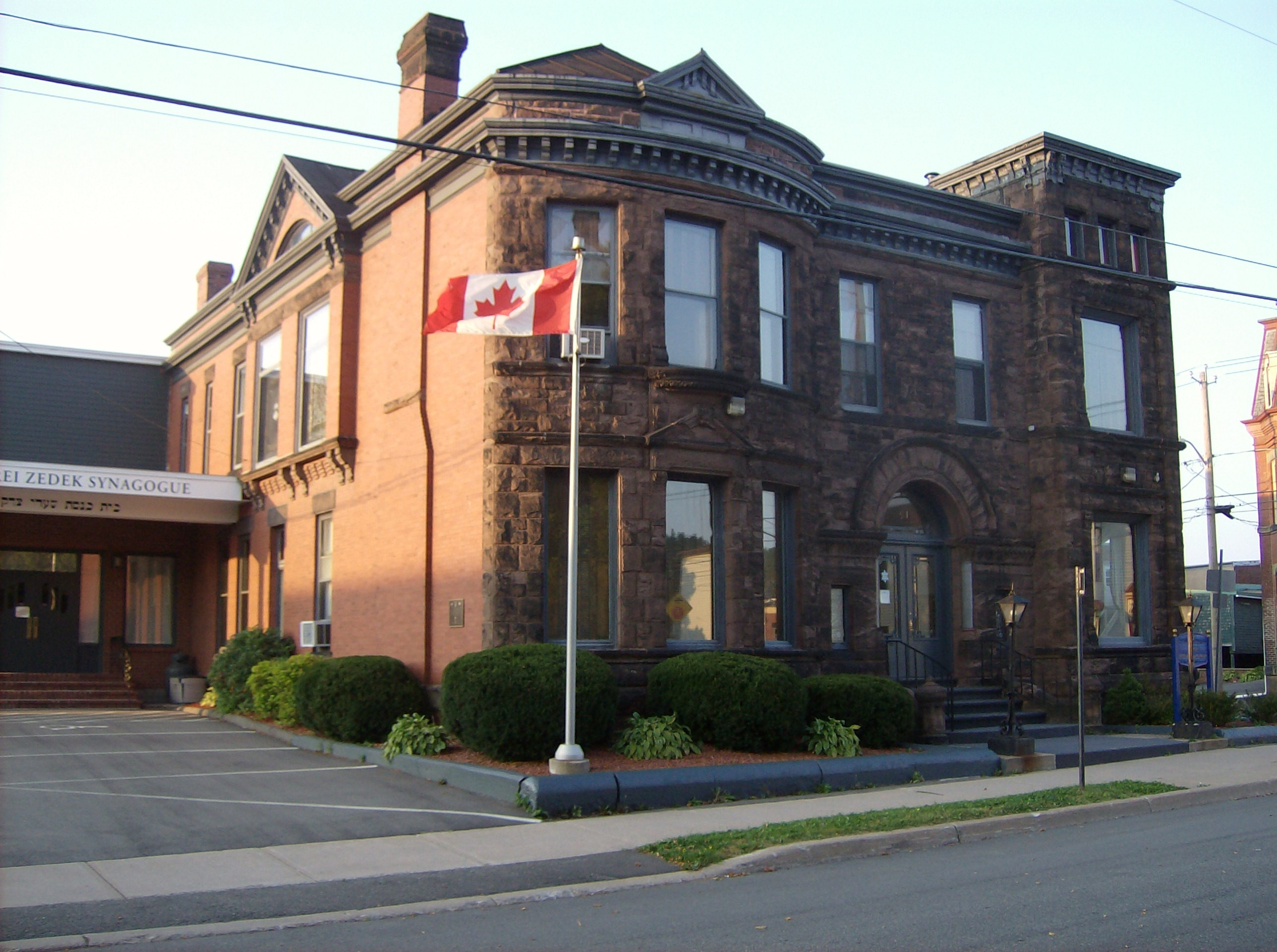

- Location within New Brunswick
- Established: July 1986
- Location: Saint John, New Brunswick
- Coordinates: 45°16′25″N 66°3′13″W
- Website: jewishmuseumsj.com

The Saint John Jewish Historical Museum in Saint John, New Brunswick, Canada, preserves and displays the history of the Jewish community in the city of Saint John. The Museum was opened by founder Marcia Koven in 1986. A Jewish Historical Society had already been established in the congregation.

== Overview ==
The Museum is based on a community history model. It is supported through artifact donations and other participation by members of the local Jewish community. The Jewish community in Saint John has roots going back to the mid-1800s. Solomon Hart, a businessman from England, became the founder of the existing Jewish community in the city when he immigrated to Saint John in 1858. The first synagogue in the city was established by Solomon and Sarah Hart in 1889. Immigration from northern and eastern Europe increased the community to about 1400 members in the 1920s. Immigration to Saint John waned after this, and as out-migration to larger cities increased, the city's Jewish population declined to about 300 members in the 1960s. Today there are roughly two dozen Jewish families in the congregation.

The Museum has several permanent exhibits, as well as new exhibits each year, and occasional travelling exhibits. Outreach programs include hosting tours from local schools, distribution of educational kits, and hosting tours from cruise ships visiting the city.

The Museum also has a library and archive of Jewish history, viewed by appointment.

== Awards ==
The museum has received several awards recognizing its work, including the following:

- American Association for State and Local History (1987)
- The Church and Synagogue Library Association (1996)
- Province of New Brunswick (2000)

== See also ==
- Jewish Museum
- Saint John, New Brunswick
- Trinity Royal Heritage Conservation Area
