= Broadview Historical Museum =

Canadian museum

- Location within Saskatchewan
- Established: July 15, 1972
- Location: 10 North Avenue, Broadview, Saskatchewan S0G 0K0
- Coordinates: 50.380°N 102.589°W
- Type: local history, First Nations, settlers, agriculture
- Historians: Exhibits Research & Development Ken Bell
- Website: [Broadview Historical Museum https://broadviewmuseum.weebly.com]

Broadview Historical Museum in Broadview, Saskatchewan, Canada, is "one of the largest small town museums" on the Canadian prairies. It opened on July 15, 1972.

== Features ==
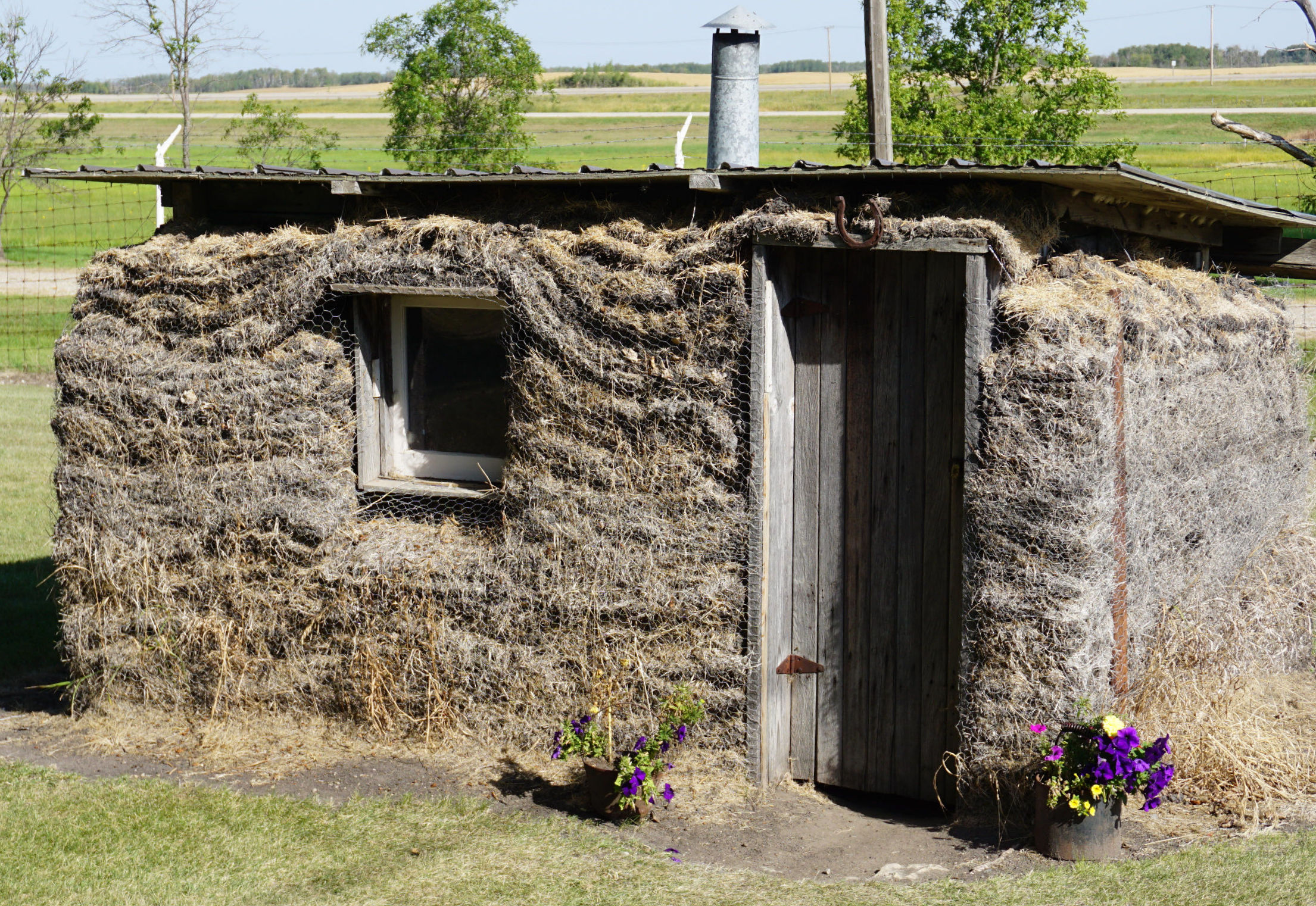
Sod house

It features the Highland One Room Schoolhouse a 1913 Canadian Pacific Railway Caboose, a reconstructed sod house, the Delorme family's one-room log cabin, extensive indoor and outdoor installations of numerous Cree and settler archives, artifacts and war memorabilia, including 'Sergeant Bill'—"Saskatchewan's most famous goat". Archival photos and documents include agricultural, military, settler, and Cree history and heritage including genealogical resources.

=== Delorme House ===
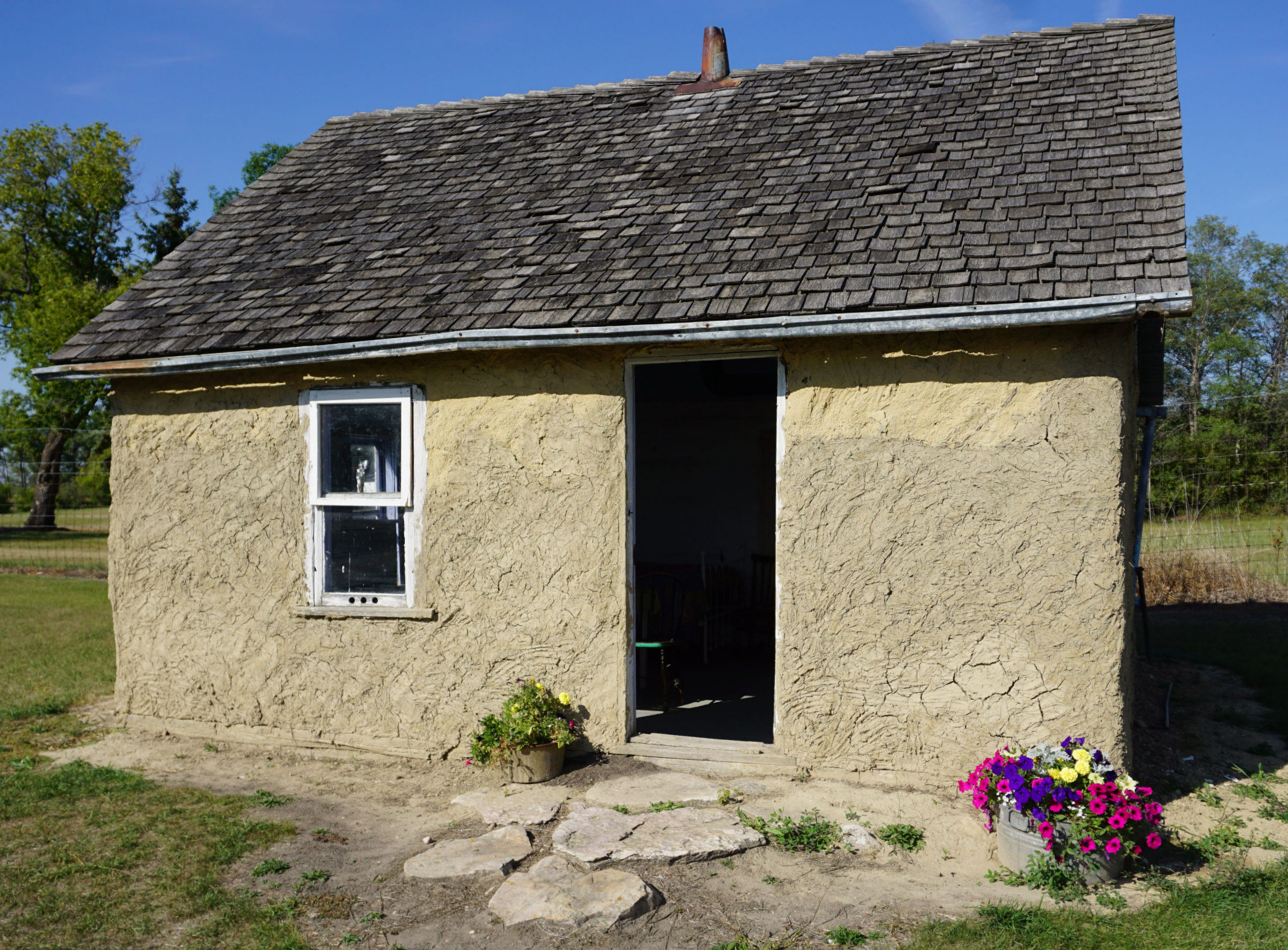
Delorme cabin

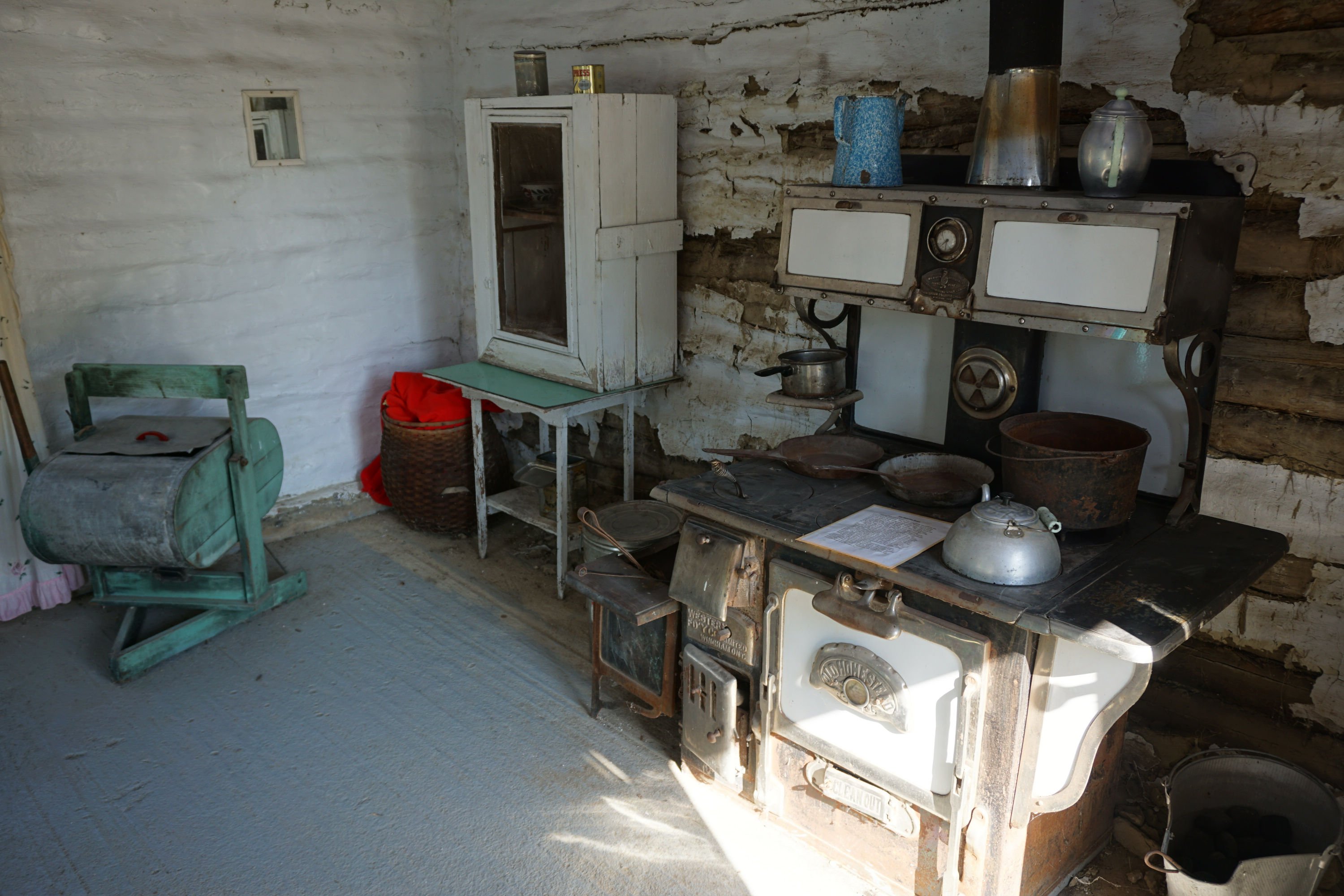
Interior of Delorme cabin

The Delorme House is a 12 by 16 foot one-room log cabin which was home to a family of five in the early 20th century.

=== Sergeant Bill ===
During World War I the 5th Battalion (Western Cavalry), CEF adopted a goat from Broadview as their mascot, bringing it with them to France and back.

== Accreditation ==
The museum is a member of the Museums Association of Saskatchewan and the Canadian Museum Association.
