= Kenosee =

Kenosee may refer to:

- Kenosee Lake, a lake in Saskatchewan, Canada
- Little Kenosee Lake, a lake in Saskatchewan
- Kenosee Lake, Saskatchewan, a village in Saskatchewan
- Kenosee Park, a park in Saskatchewan
- Kenosee Superslides, a water park in Moose Mountain Provincial Park, Saskatchewan
