= Saskatchewan Highway 209 =

Provincial highway in Saskatchewan, Canada

Highway 209
- Kenosee Drive
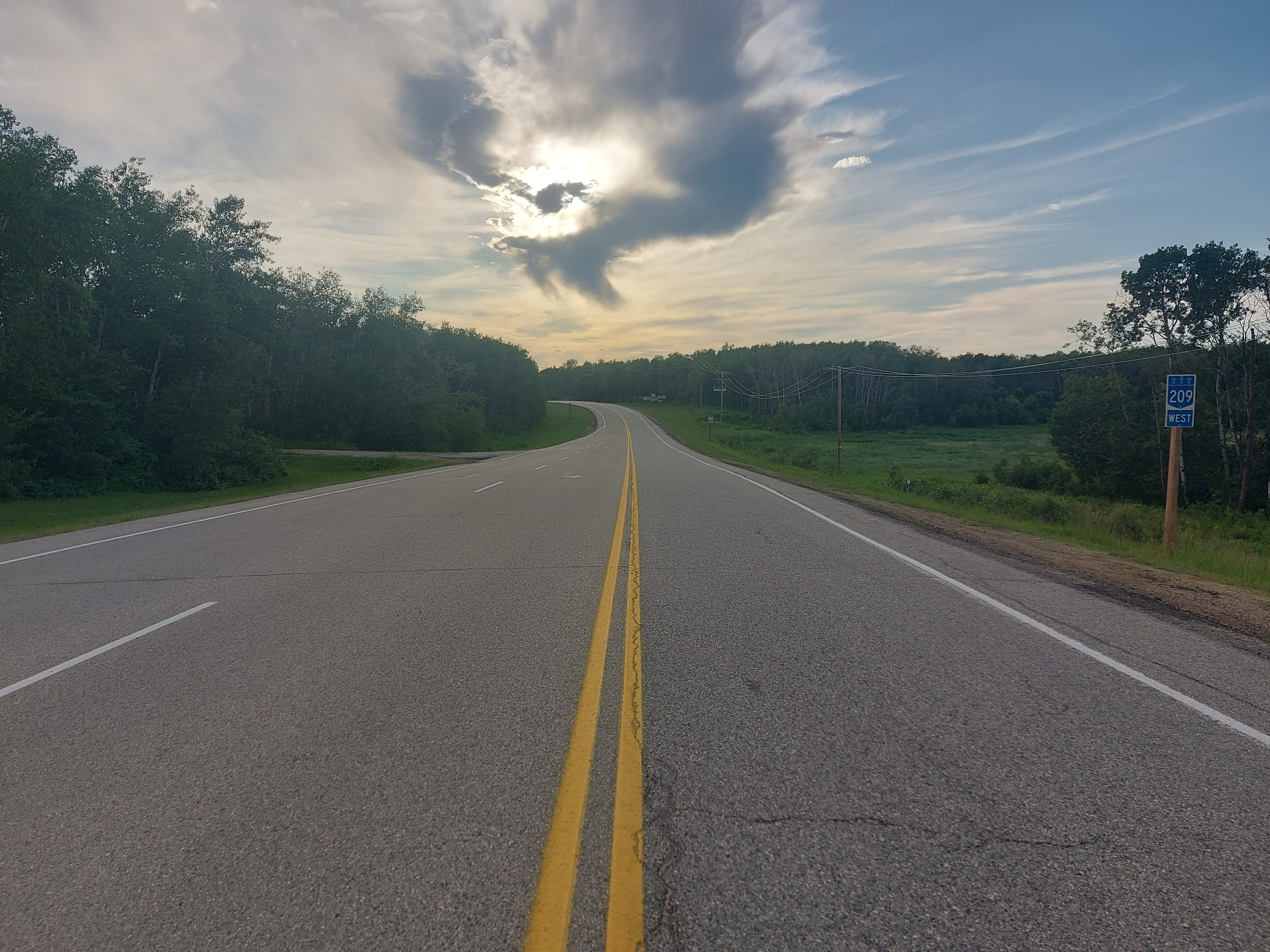
- Hwy 209 in Moose Mountain Provincial Park

Route information
- Maintained by Ministry of Highways and Infrastructure
- Length: 4.9 km (3.0 mi)

Major junctions
- West end: Moose Mountain Provincial Park
- East end: Highway 9 near Kenosee Lake

Location
- Country: Canada
- Province: Saskatchewan
- Rural municipalities: Wawken

Highway system
- Provincial highways in Saskatchewan
← Highway 204	→ Highway 210

Highway 209, also known as Kenosee Drive, is a provincial highway in the Canadian province of Saskatchewan. Saskatchewan's 200-series highways primarily service its recreational areas. The highway runs from Highway 9 near the village of Kenosee Lake to a point about 5 kilometres (3.1 mi) into Moose Mountain Provincial Park near Little Kenosee Lake.

Highway 209 provides access to Moose Mountain Provincial Park's various amenities, such as campgrounds, the golf course, hiking trails, ball diamonds, picnic areas, and lakes.

== Route description ==
Hwy 209 begins in a remote area of the park at an intersection with an access road to the Little Kenosee Lake boat launch, with Kenosee Drive continuing west deep into the park on gravel. It heads east to have an intersection with Hazelwood Avenue, which provides access to the Birch Forest Interpretative Trail as well as several church camps and the Mother Teresa Centre, before crossing the narrow isthmus separating Little Kenosee Lake and Kenosee Lake travelling through campgrounds. As the highway travels along the northern coastline of Kenosee Lake, it passes a golf course, several lakeside cottages, and the Kenossee Inn, before passing through the main park gate, entering the village of Kenosee Lake and travelling along its northern side as it pulls more inland away from the lake to come to an end a short time later at a junction with Hwy 9 (Saskota Flyway). The entire length of Hwy 209 is a paved, two-lane highway, lying within the Rural Municipality of Wawken No. 93.

== Major intersections ==
From west to east:

Rural municipality	Location	km	mi	Destinations	Notes
Wawken No. 93	Moose Mountain Provincial Park	0.0	0.0	Little Moose Lake boat launch access road / Kenosee Drive	Western terminus
Wawken No. 93	Moose Mountain Provincial Park	0.2	0.12	Hazelwood Avenue – Birch Forest Interpretative Trail, Church Camps, Mother Teresa Centre	
Wawken No. 93	Moose Mountain Provincial Park	4.1	2.5	Moose Mountain Provincial Park main gate	
Wawken No. 93	Kenosee Lake	5.2	3.2	Highway 9 (Saskota Flyway) – Whitewood, Carlyle	Eastern terminus
1.000 mi = 1.609 km; 1.000 km = 0.621 mi

== See also ==
- Transportation in Saskatchewan
- Roads in Saskatchewan
