= Beaver Lake (Saskatchewan) =

Lake in Saskatchewan, Canada

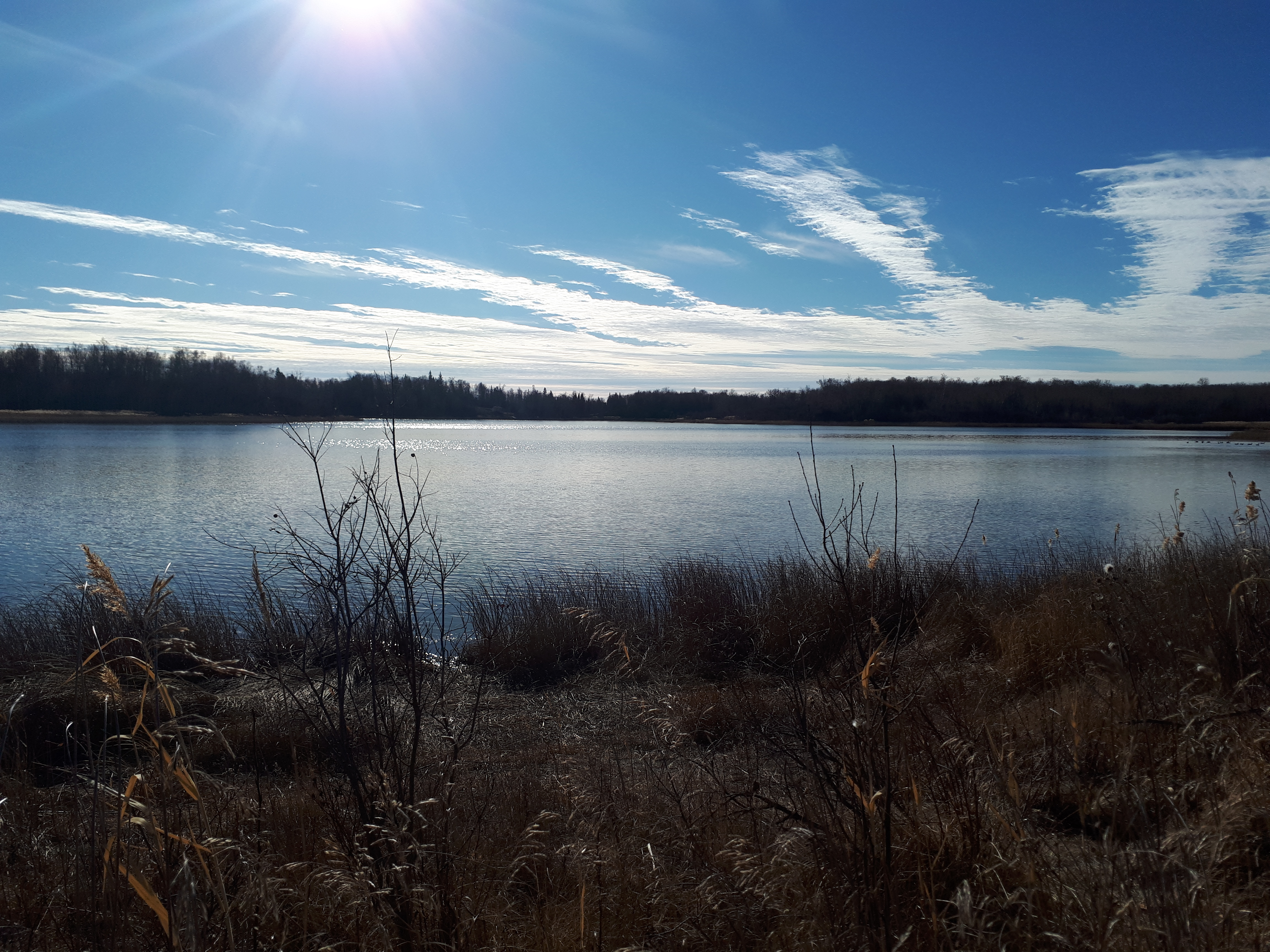
- Beaver Lake

- Location in Saskatchewan Beaver Lake (Canada)
- Location: RM of Wawken No. 93, Saskatchewan
- Coordinates: 49.8415°N 102.2974°W
- Type: Endorheic lake
- Part of: Red River drainage basin
- River sources: Moose Mountain Upland
- Primary outflows: None
- Basin countries: Canada
- Surface area: 21.1 ha (52 acres)
- Shore length^{1}: 2 km (1.2 mi)
- Settlements: Kenosee Lake
- ^{1} Shore length is not a well-defined measure.

Beaver Lake is a lake in the south-eastern portion of the Canadian province of Saskatchewan, just north of the community of Kenosee Lake in Moose Mountain Provincial Park.

The lake and park are on a plateau called Moose Mountain Upland in the prairie pothole region of Saskatchewan.

There is a 7.2-kilometre (4.5 mi) long trail that goes around Beaver Lake called Beaver Lake and Youell Lake Trails.

== See also ==
- List of lakes of Saskatchewan
- List of protected areas of Saskatchewan
- Tourism in Saskatchewan
