= Superslide =

Superslide may refer to:

- Superslide (film), a roll film format 36x36mm to 40x40mm
- Kenosee Superslides, a water park in Saskatchewan, Canada
