= Kenosee Lake, Saskatchewan =

Village in Saskatchewan, Canada

Kenosee Lake We-non-cha
- Village
- Village of Kenosee Lake
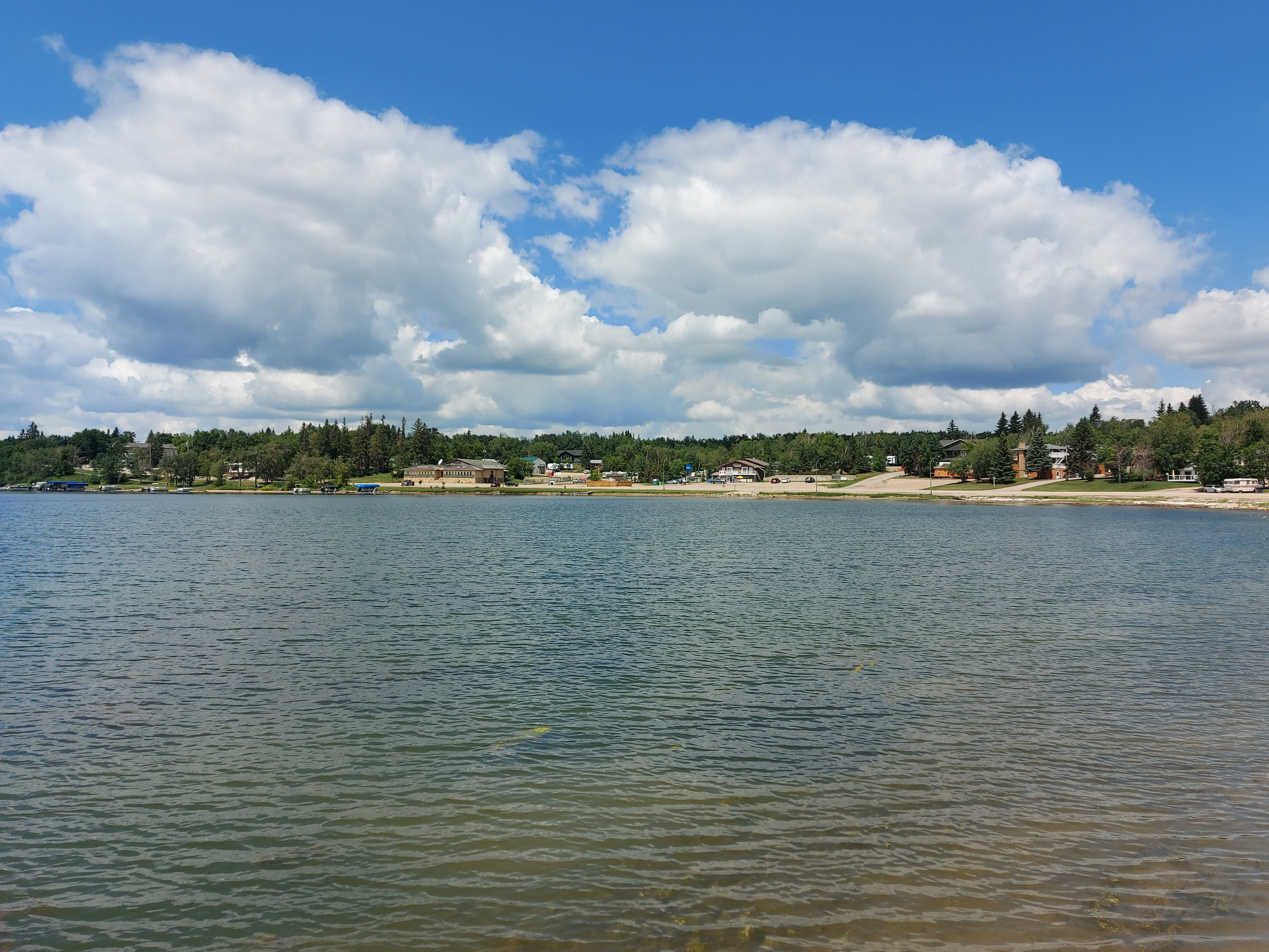
- Kenosee Lake

- Location within Saskatchewan Location within Canada
- Coordinates: 49°49′59″N 102°17′7″W
- Country: Canada
- Province: Saskatchewan
- Region: Southeast
- Census division: 1
- Rural municipality: Wawken No. 93
- Post office Founded: 1908-07-01

Government
  - Type: Municipal
  - Governing body: Kenosee Lake Village Council
  - Mayor: Mark Doty
  - Administrator: Andrea Kosior
  - MP: Robert Kitchen
  - MLA: Dan D'Autremont

Area
  - Total: 0.35 km^{2} (0.14 sq mi)

Population (2016)
  - Total: 234
  - Density: 662.9/km^{2} (1,717/sq mi)
- Time zone: UTC-6 (CST)
- Postal code: S0C 2S0
- Area code: 306
- Highways: Highway 9 Highway 209

Kenosee Lake (2016 population: 234) is a village in the Canadian province of Saskatchewan within the Rural Municipality of Wawken No. 93 and Census Division No. 1. The village is situated on Moose Bay at the north-east corner of Kenosee Lake in Moose Mountain Upland. It is entirely surrounded by Moose Mountain Provincial Park and access is from Highway 9 and Highway 209. Kenosee Lake was incorporated as a village on 1 October 1987. The closest town is Carlyle, which is about 24 kilometres (15 mi) south along Highway 9.

== History ==
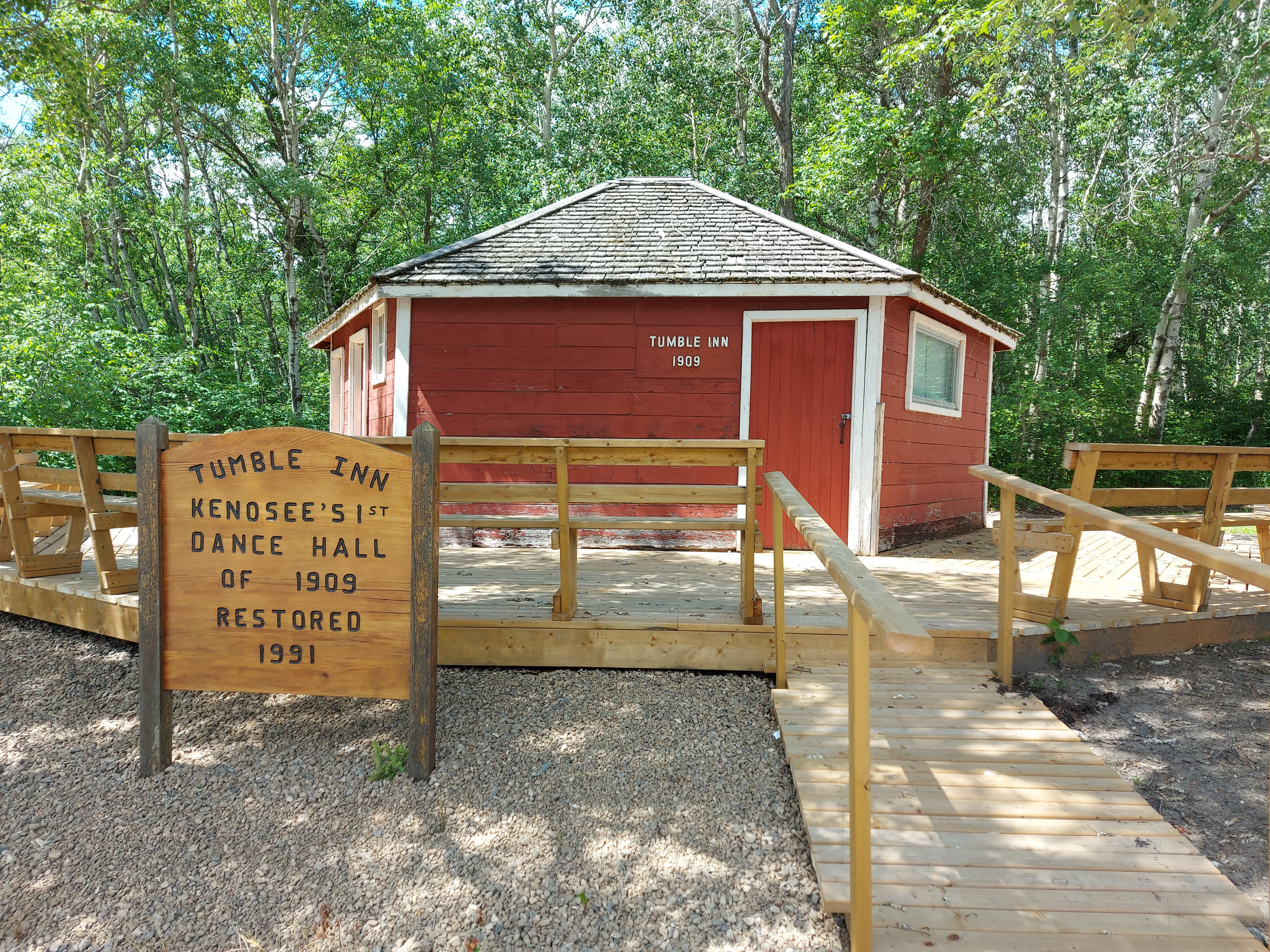
Tumble Inn Dance Hall, built in 1909 and restored in 1991

Long before Kenosee Lake became an official village, the area around the lake, which had been called Fish Lake until 1932, was quite popular as a resort community. In the 1890s, Fred Christopher and sons, who were German immigrants and had a homestead seven miles east of Fish Lake, and the Fripp brothers, Harold and Percy who owned the land that the village of Kenosee Lake currently sits on, agreed to cut a trail through the bush from Fish Lake to Cannington Manor. That trail became known as "Christopher Trail" and is still used today as the main gravel road between Kenosee Lake and Cannington Manor. The first actual road to the lake, though, was built from a spot about 3 miles west of Carlyle past the lakes of McGurk, Stevenson, and Hewitt to the west side of Fish Lake in 1905. On that west side of the lake was another resort called Arcola Resort. For a variety of reasons, such as a lack of potable water and when the new Highway 9 was built in the early 1930s, it went to the east side of the lake, it wasn't as successful as the resorts on the north-east shore. By the 1940s, the last cottage was gone. That spot on the west side of the lake is now occupied by three Christian summer camps.

The Christopher family built the Saint Rest Resort in 1897 on Percy Fripp's land and then in 1899, bought the land. About that same time, several dance halls, stores, and cabins sprung up along the beaches. The oldest surviving dance hall is Tumble Inn, which was built in 1909 by the Christopher family. The Inn was part of the Pioneer Host hotel, also built and owned by the Christophers. The large bay on the north-west portion of the lake, Christopher Bay, is named after that early pioneering family. Tumble Inn is located on Waseca Avenue and was restored in 1991.

In 1913, Fred Christopher sold 40 of the 42 acres he owned to Henry William Holquist "Hank" who immediately started expansion and upgrades to the resort. He built a new hotel, dance hall, and store, and was soon out-pacing the competing resort, Clarke's Resort which had been started six years prior when Ray Boilean Clarke bought 40 acres to the east in 1907. Holquist named his resort We-non-cha Summer Resort. By the late 1920s, there were two hotels and 60 cottages. In 1933, he built the Kenosee Gardens, which was the largest dance hall there. The "Gardens", as it came to be known, attracted big names in the Big Band era. There was even a casino in the Gardens. Ray Boilean Clarke's health started to fail in the 1930s. His two sons, Hugh "Puddy" and Charlie Clarke took over day-to-day operations. Charlie, though, left the resort later in the 1930s to work on a nearby farm. Ray died in 1941 leaving his widow and son, Hugh, to tend the resort. Although now closed and in disrepair, Kenosee Gardens still stands overlooking the lake from the centre of the village.

In 1942, Clarke Resort's hotel burnt down. Holquist, who was by this time getting on in years, sold his We-non-cha Summer Resort to Hugh Clarke. Clarke soon absorbed the resort into his own, removed the name We-non-cha, and became the dominant resort in the region. In 1956, Kenosee Gardens was sold to Lawrence James Albert Hirtle. Hugh died in 1958. By 1959, much of the land was surveyed and subdivided into 200 lots, which sold quickly. At this time, the RM of Wawken built roads throughout the new subdivision. In the early 1970s, it was sold to Leipert & Jones. The village of Kenosee Lake sits mostly on the original Clarke, Hirtle lands. On 5 July 1978, the community became independent of the RM and named itself "We-non-cha". In 1981, it was renamed to the Village of Kenosee Lake. In 1987, it gained official village status.

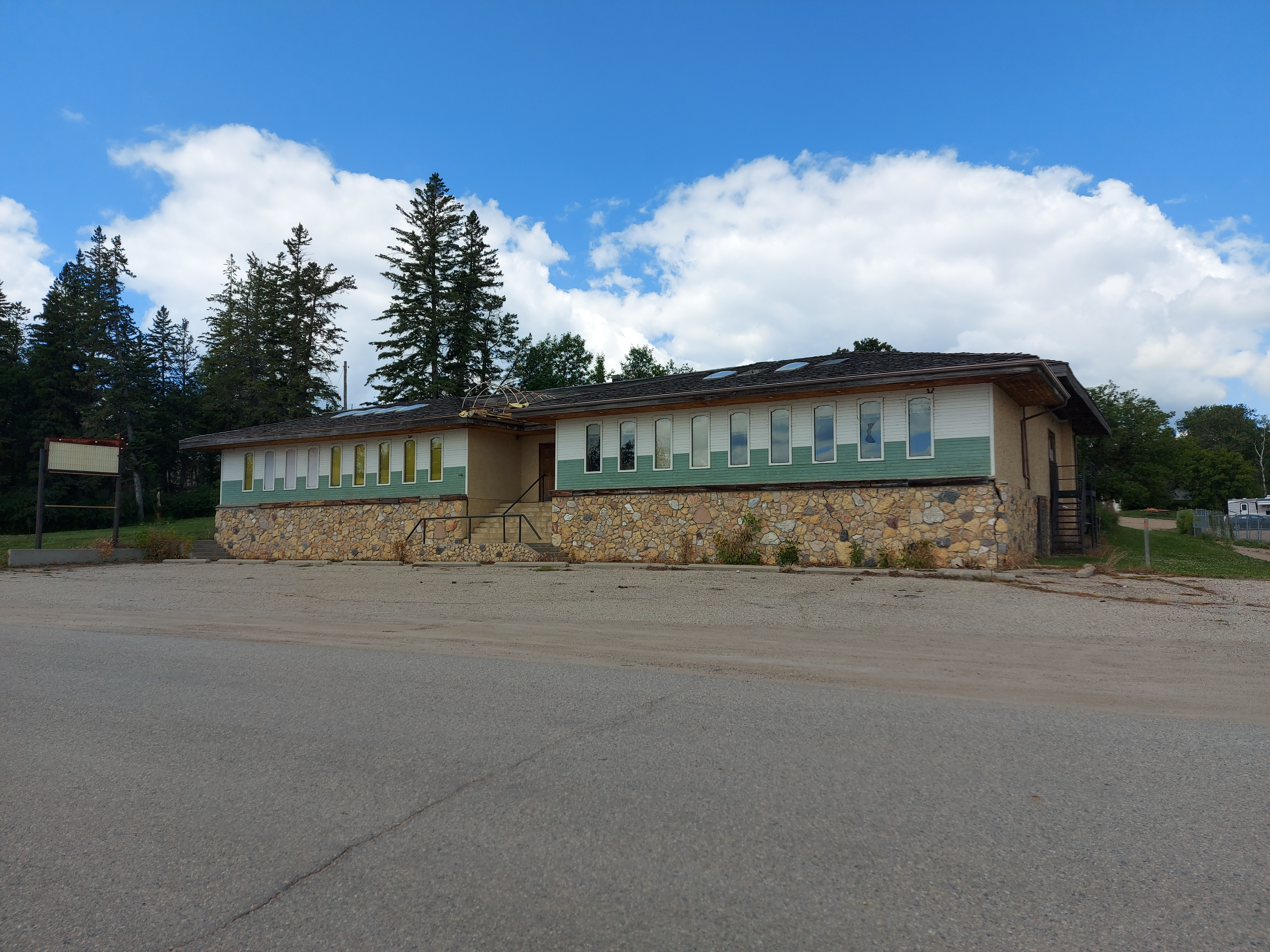
Kenosee Gardens Dance Hall, built in 1933

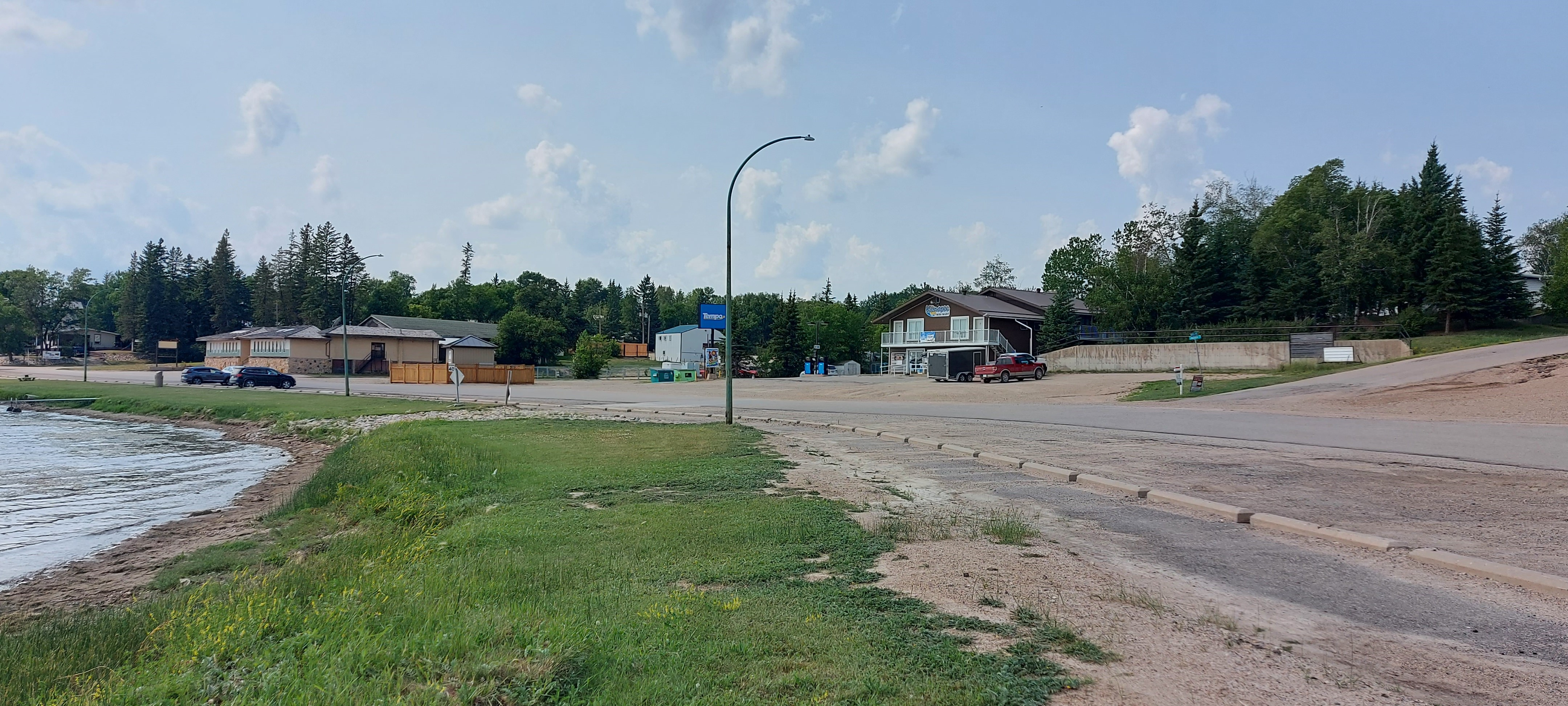
Downtown Kenosee Lake

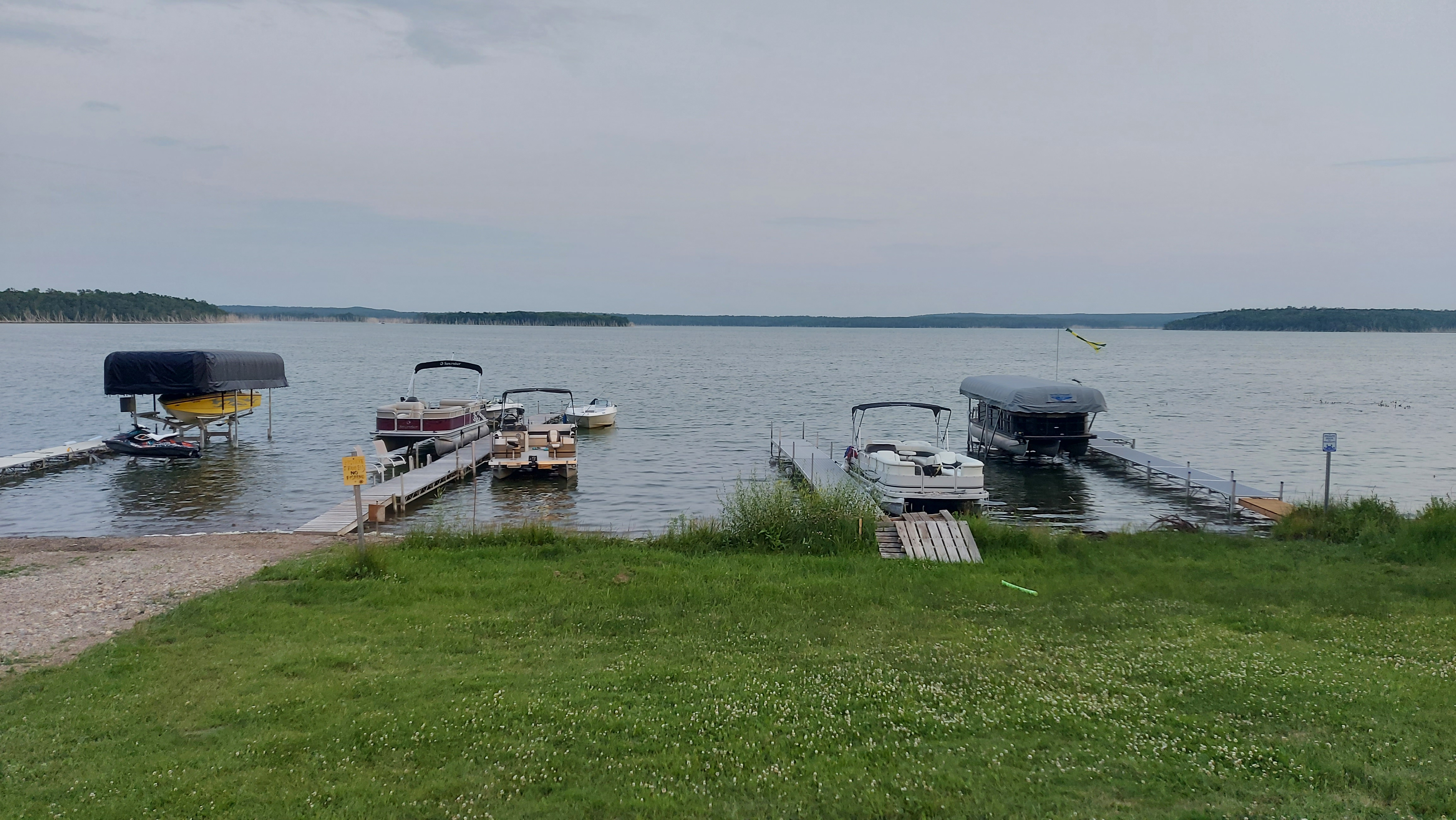
Piers at Kenosee Lake

== Demographics ==
Population history (1981–2016)
Year	Pop.	±%
1981	114	—
1986	139	+21.9%
1991	163	+17.3%
1996	202	+23.9%
2001	182	−9.9%
2006	194	+6.6%
2011	258	+33.0%
2016	234	−9.3%
Source: Statistics Canada via Saskatchewan Bureau of Statistics

In the 2021 Census of Population conducted by Statistics Canada, Kenosee Lake had a population of 236 living in 105 of its 147 total private dwellings, a change of 0.9% from its 2016 population of 234. With a land area of 0.4 km^{2} (0.15 sq mi), it had a population density of 590.0/km^{2} (1,528.1/sq mi) in 2021.

In the 2016 Census of Population, the Village of Kenosee Lake recorded a population of 234 living in 117 of its 179 total private dwellings, a −10.3% change from its 2011 population of 258. With a land area of 0.35 km^{2} (0.14 sq mi), it had a population density of 668.6/km^{2} (1,731.6/sq mi) in 2016.

== Attractions and services ==
The village is at the heart of Moose Mountain Provincial Park and as such provides many of the park's services, such as a gas station, restaurant, convenience store, a private full-service campground, a church (Moose Mountain Church of Christ), and a volunteer fire department. Nearby Kenosee, in and around the park, is full-service camping, 18-hole golf, miniature golf, a casino, piers for fishing and boating, swimming, hiking, picnicking, Moose Mountain Chalet, the Kenosee Superslides, the Red Barn Market, and accommodations, such as cabins.

=== Sports ===
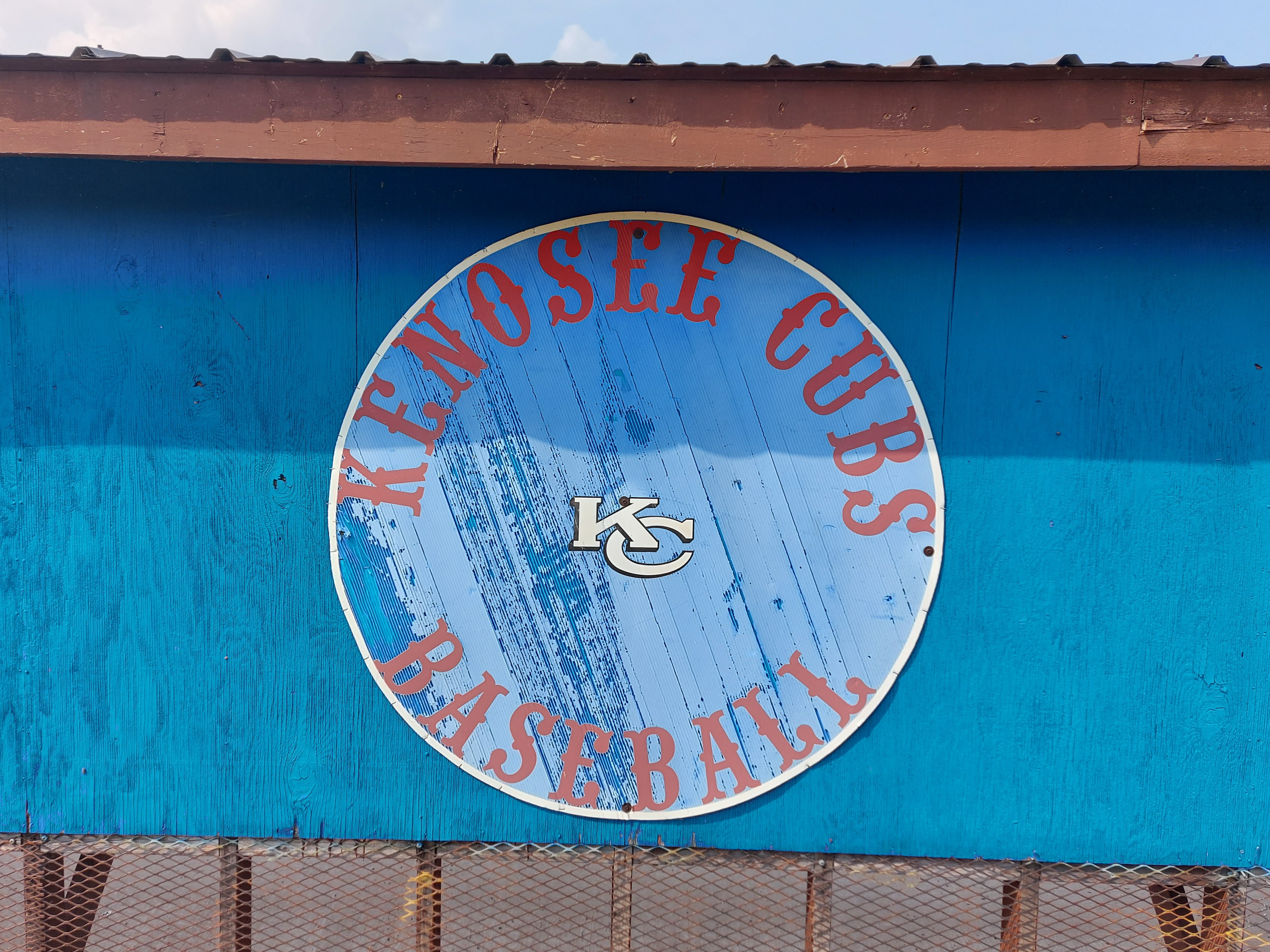
Kenosee Cubs logo

The Kenosee Cubs of the Saskota Baseball League play at the ball diamonds just west of the village in Moose Mountain Park.

== See also ==
- List of communities in Saskatchewan
- List of villages in Saskatchewan
- Carlyle Lake Resort
- Tourism in Saskatchewan
