= Kenosee Lake =

Lake in Saskatchewan, Canada

- Fish Lake
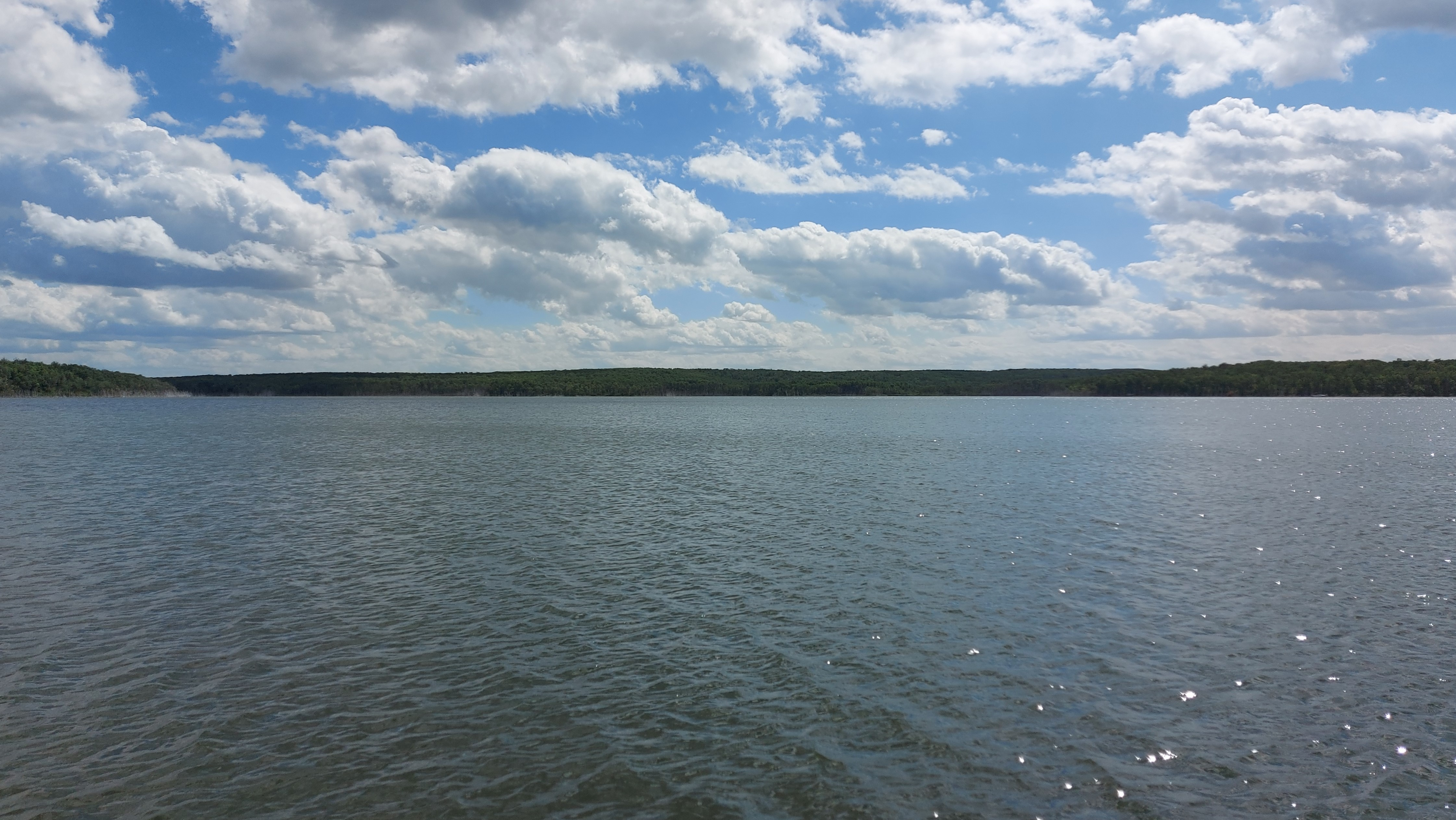
- Christopher Bay at Kenosee Lake

- Location in Saskatchewan Kenosee Lake (Canada)
- Location: RM of Wawken No. 93, Saskatchewan
- Coordinates: 49°49′N 102°17′W
- Type: Endorheic lake
- Part of: Red River drainage basin
- River sources: Moose Mountain Upland
- Primary outflows: None
- Basin countries: Canada
- Surface area: 851.9 ha (2,105 acres)
- Max. depth: 10 m (33 ft)
- Shore length^{1}: 33 km (21 mi)
- Surface elevation: 741 m (2,431 ft)
- Islands: Hog Island; Maple Island; Horseshoe Island
- Settlements: Kenosee Lake
- ^{1} Shore length is not a well-defined measure.

Kenosee Lake, also known as Fish Lake, is a closed-basin kettle lake in the south-east corner of the Canadian province of Saskatchewan. The lake lies in Moose Mountain Provincial Park in the heart of the Moose Mountain Upland, a forested plateau that rises about 200 metres (660 ft) above the surrounding prairie. Over the years, lake water levels have fluctuated greatly.

The village of Kenosee Lake and the neighbouring Moose Mountain subdivisions are the only places on the lake with a year-round population. Kenosee Lake has campgrounds, hiking trails, beaches, and docks for fishing and lake access. Winter sees snowmobiling, ice fishing, and tobogganing. There are three Bible camps on the west side of the lake at the site of a long-abandoned resort community. Access to Kenosee Lake and its amenities is from Highways 9 and 209.

== History ==
In the late 1800s, nearby hay farmers, the Weatherald brothers, named the lake "Fish Lake". It remained that way until provincial deputy minister John Barnett, upon the opening of Moose Mountain Provincial Park, renamed it Kenosee Lake based on the Cree word kinosew (ᑭᓄᓭᐤ):

"We'll change the name of this place to Kenosee Lake...that is Indian for fish. We'll build a chalet here, on that rise above the depression making this into a sunken garden."

Up until the late 1890s, Manitoba Maples were very common on Moose Mountain. Settlers and the local Indigenous peoples made syrup from the sap of the maples trees. The island right to the south of Hog Island is named Maple Island because of all the syrup producing maple trees. In 1897, a massive fire swept through much of Moose Mountain, destroying most of the maple trees and ending the burgeoning syrup industry. The trees on Maple Island were spared from the fire because of all the water surrounding the island.

== Description ==
At an area of 851.9 hectares (2,105 acres), Kenosee Lake is the largest lake in Moose Mountain Provincial Park and the second largest on Moose Mountain (after White Bear (Carlyle) Lake). It is about 10 metres (33 ft) deep and has a shoreline of 33 kilometres (21 mi). Kenosee Lake is a kettle lake with no outflow and no significant inflows. Most of the water that flows into it is from rain, ground water, and melting snow. Fish Creek, the only named inflow, flows into Kenosee Lake at its northern shore. It is a short creek that begins at Little Kenosee Lake and passes under Highway 209 before entering Kenosee Lake.

Jutting out from the western shore is a peninsula named Pickerel Point. It forms a large bay at the north-west corner of the lake named Christopher Bay (formerly Arcola Bay).

There are three named islands in the lake, the largest of which is Hog Island. Hog Island got its name from when an early pioneering family, the Christophers, kept their hogs on that island to keep them safe from predators, such as wolves. In the 1920s, wolves were hunted to extinction on Moose Mountain. Maple Island is just to the south of Hog Island and was named for the syrup producing maple trees on it. The third named island is to the south of Maple Island and is called Horseshoe Island. All three islands are on the east side of the lake.

== Recreation ==
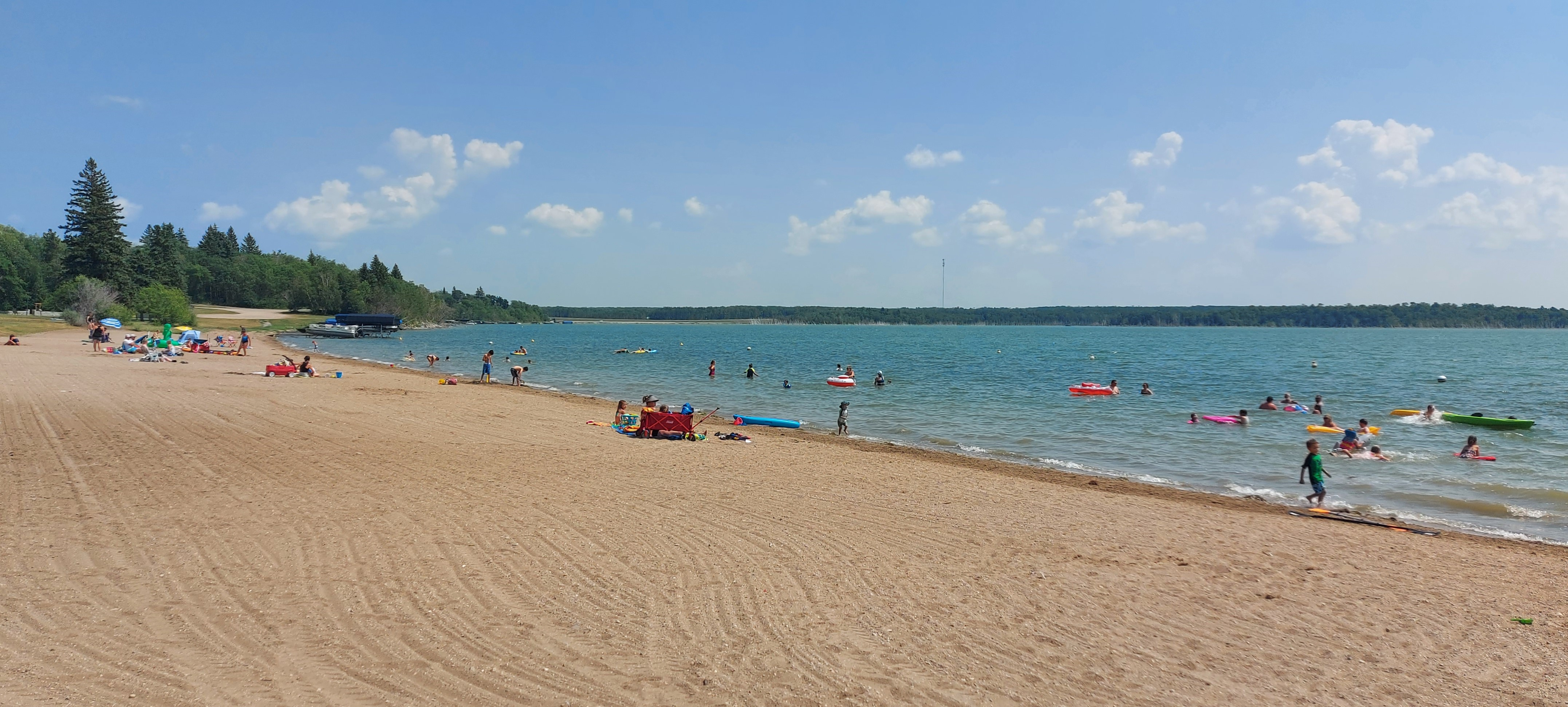
Kenose Lake Main Beach, Moose Mountain Provincial Park

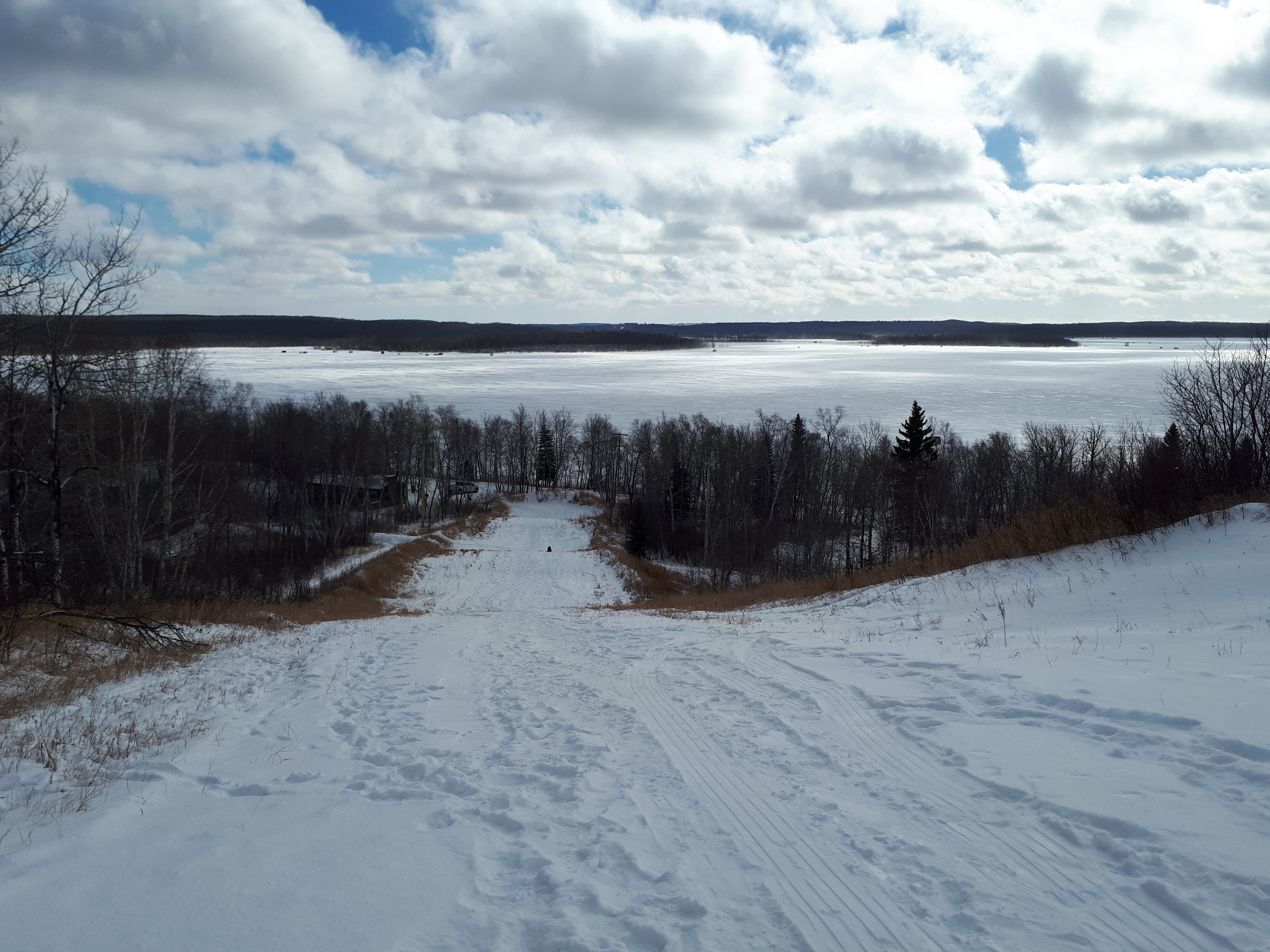
Tobogganing hill overlooking Kenosee Lake

Kenosee Lake is the largest lake in Moose Mountain Provincial Park and is at the centre of activities and amenities for the park. The village of Kenosee Lake is on the north-eastern shore and has a public beach and park access.

The park's Core Area is on the northern shore and it has food, mini golf, cabins, beach and lake access, and a water park. Also along the northern shore are campgrounds, fishing docks, and a boat launch. Along the western shore are three Christian Bible camps — Kenosee Boys & Girls Camp, Clearview Christian Camp, and Kenosee Lake Bible Camp. The Bible camps are at the site of the long-abandoned community of Arcola Bay Resort.

In the winter, activities at the lake include snowmobiling, ice fishing, and Tobogganing.

== Historic lake levels ==
Like many lakes on the prairies, Kenosee Lake does not have an outflow. The water levels of Kenosee Lake have been monitored periodically since the first land surveyors came in the 1870s. It has been shown that lake levels have fluctuated greatly in the past. Tree stumps exist today that are rooted lower than any recorded level of the lake. Only once since records have been kept has Kenosee Lake over-flowed its banks and that was in 1928 when it flowed into another closed-basin lake, White Bear (Carlyle) Lake.

=== Restoration of lake levels ===
Beaver are not native to Moose Mountain. In 1923, two breeding pairs from Hudson Bay, Saskatchewan were brought to the lake. One pair was released on the north side and the other pair on the south side. The beavers flourished and soon there were beaver dams on all of the inflows to the lake. This caused the water levels to drop dramatically. In 1954, there were heavy rains but due to the dams, the lake level remained low. The community members asked the government to step in, but nothing was done. The locals then decided to take out four dams on their own. The removal of those four dams increased the level of the lake, but not quite to ideal levels.

According to aerial photographs, the surface of Kenosee Lake was 742 metres (2,434 ft) above sea level in 1928. An elevation of 742.2 metres (2,435 ft) is considered full. By 1950, it had dropped to 738 metres (2,421 ft). With the destruction of the beaver dams in 1954, the lake recovered to 740 metres (2,430 ft) by 1960. Without further intervention regarding beaver control, by 2008, the lake levels had dropped down to 737 metres (2,418 ft). By 2009, the lake had dropped to its lowest level at 6.1 metres (20 ft) below full levels. It dropped so low that Hog Island, the lake's largest island, was no longer an island.

In 2008, the Moose Mountain Water Resource Management Corp. partnered with Moose Mountain Provincial Park to control beavers through trapping and by blasting beaver dams. They also looked at other ways to control water levels, such as through building culverts and spillways. Fish Creek, a short creek that flows from Little Kenosee Lake to Kenosee Lake had been blocked when the main road through the park was built. Part of the water level restoration project was to build culverts to allow the creek to flow again. Between 2008 and 2013, lake water levels rose 2.74 metres (9 ft 0 in). The corporation and park planned to see a rise of another 2.7 metres (9 ft), as that would be enough for Kenosee to overflow its banks and flow into White Bear (Carlyle) Lake, which is also well below ideal levels. By 2016, lake levels had stabilised at about 741 metres (2,431 ft), just below the level that would see it overflow.

== Fish species ==
Fish species commonly found in Kenosee Lake include walleye, yellow perch, northern pike, and white sucker. The lake is periodically stocked with fish.

== Gallery ==
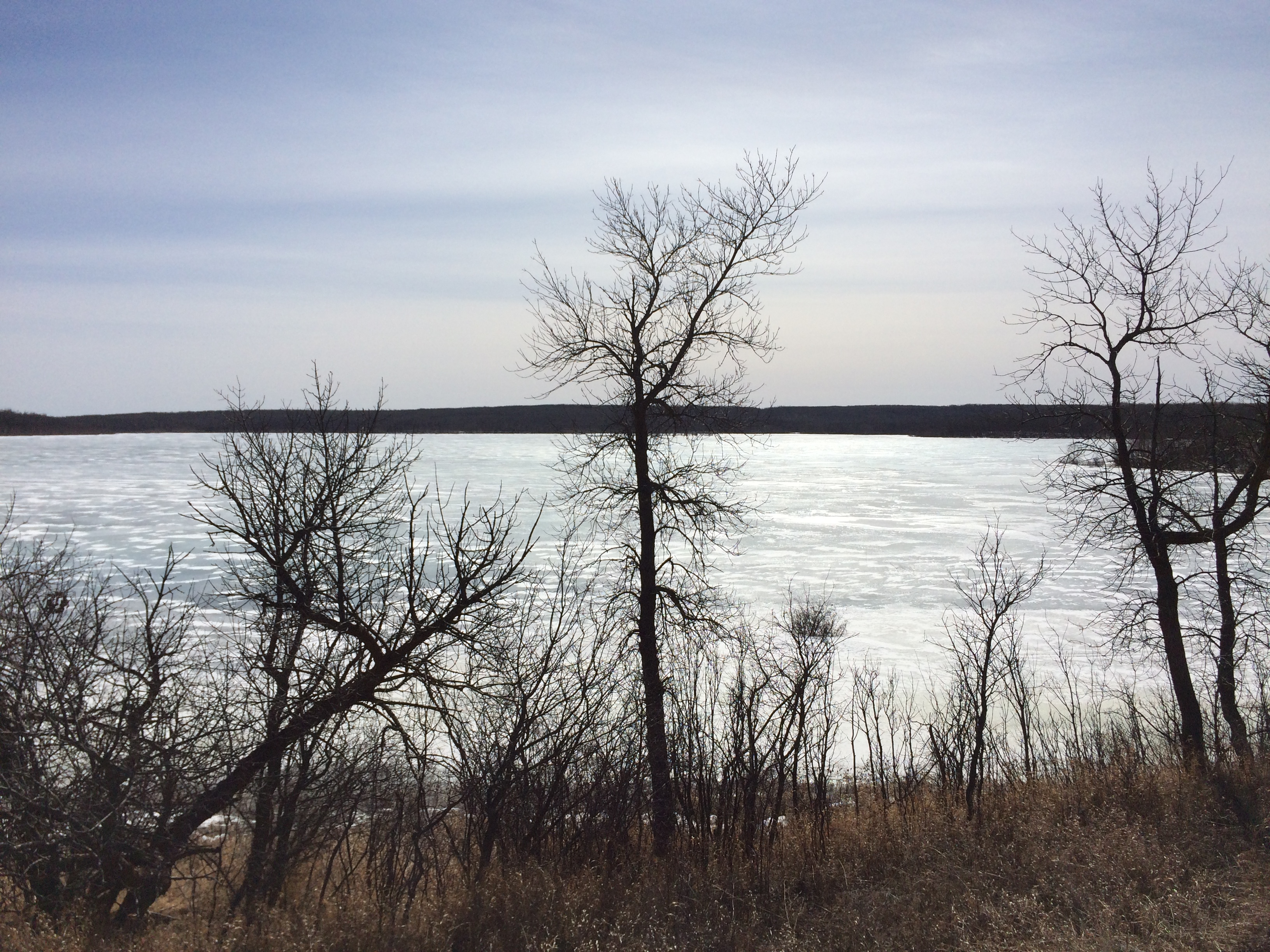
A frozen Kenosee Lake

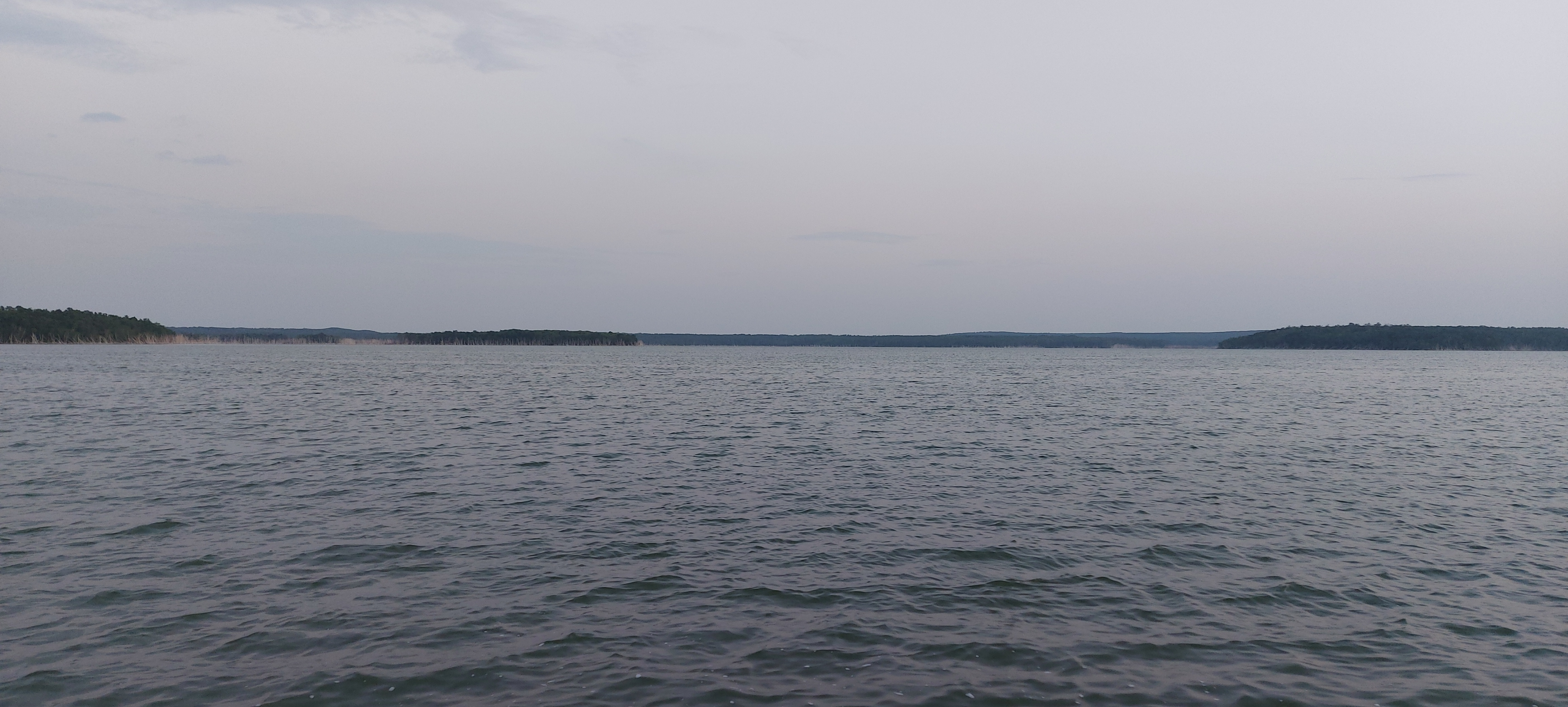
Kenosee Lake at dusk

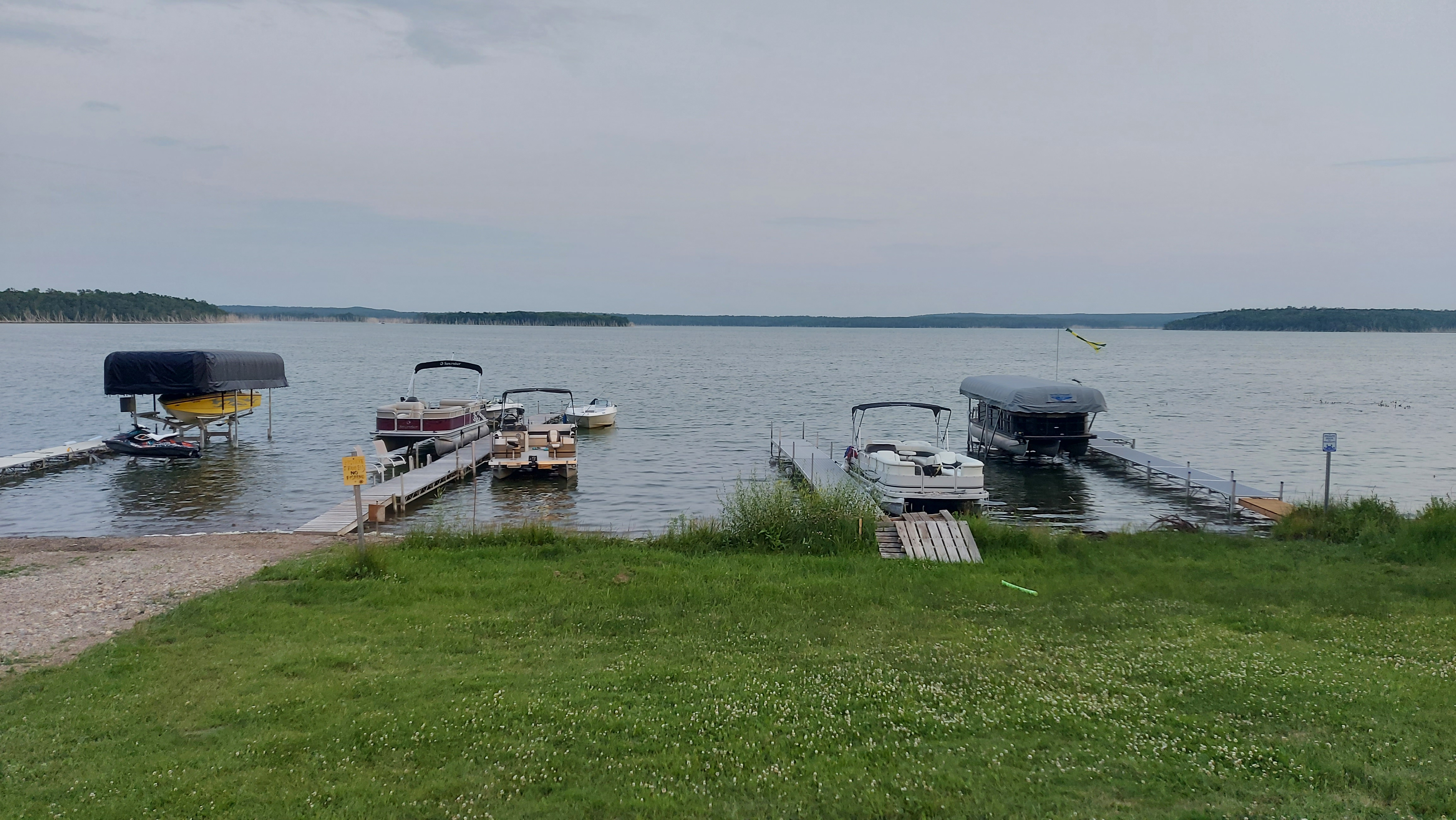
Piers at Kenosee Lake

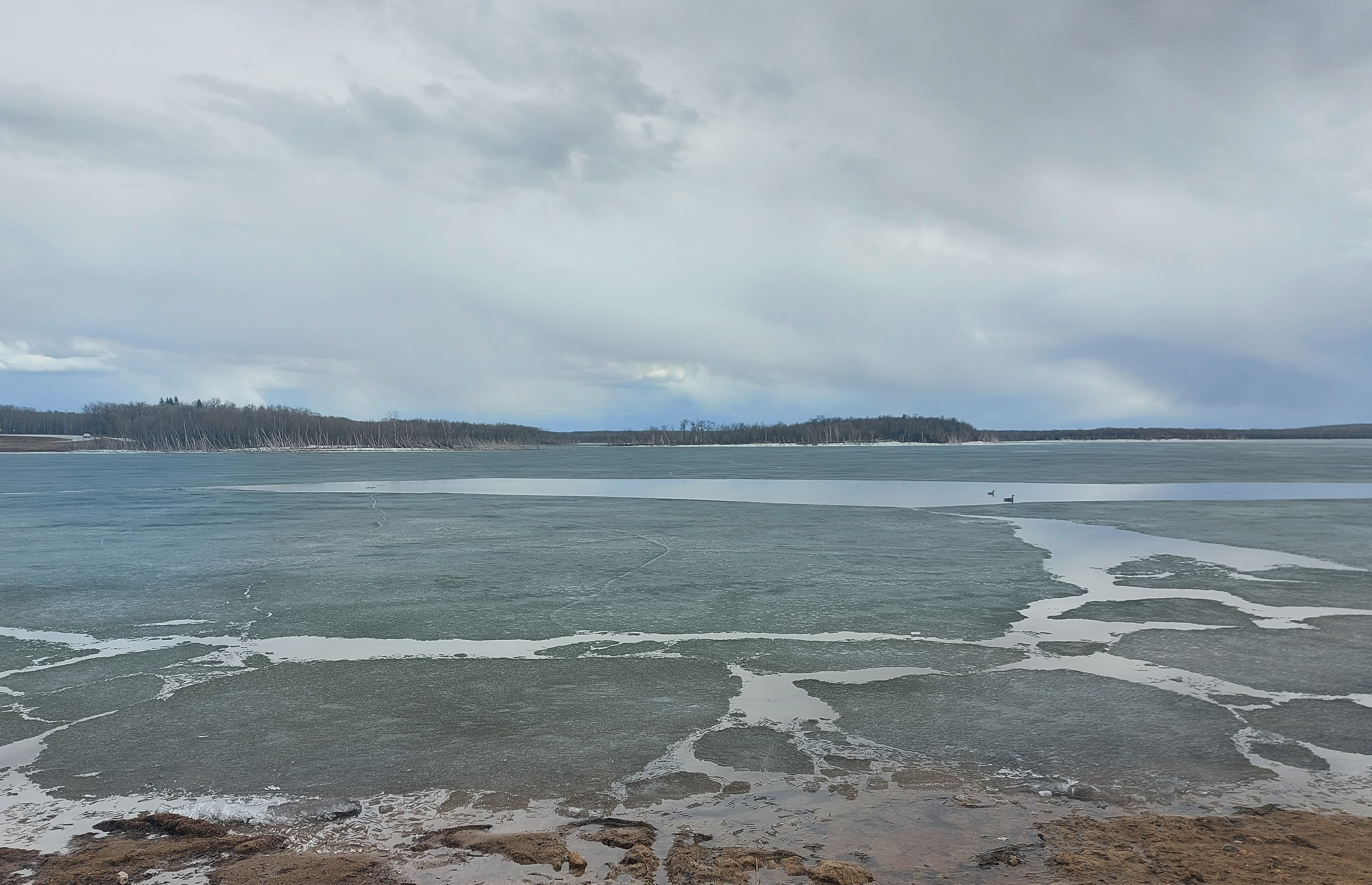
Kenosee Lake during the spring melt in May 2022

== See also ==
- List of place names in Canada of Indigenous origin
- Tourism in Saskatchewan
- List of lakes of Saskatchewan
