= Kenosee Superslides =

Water park in Saskatchewan, Canada

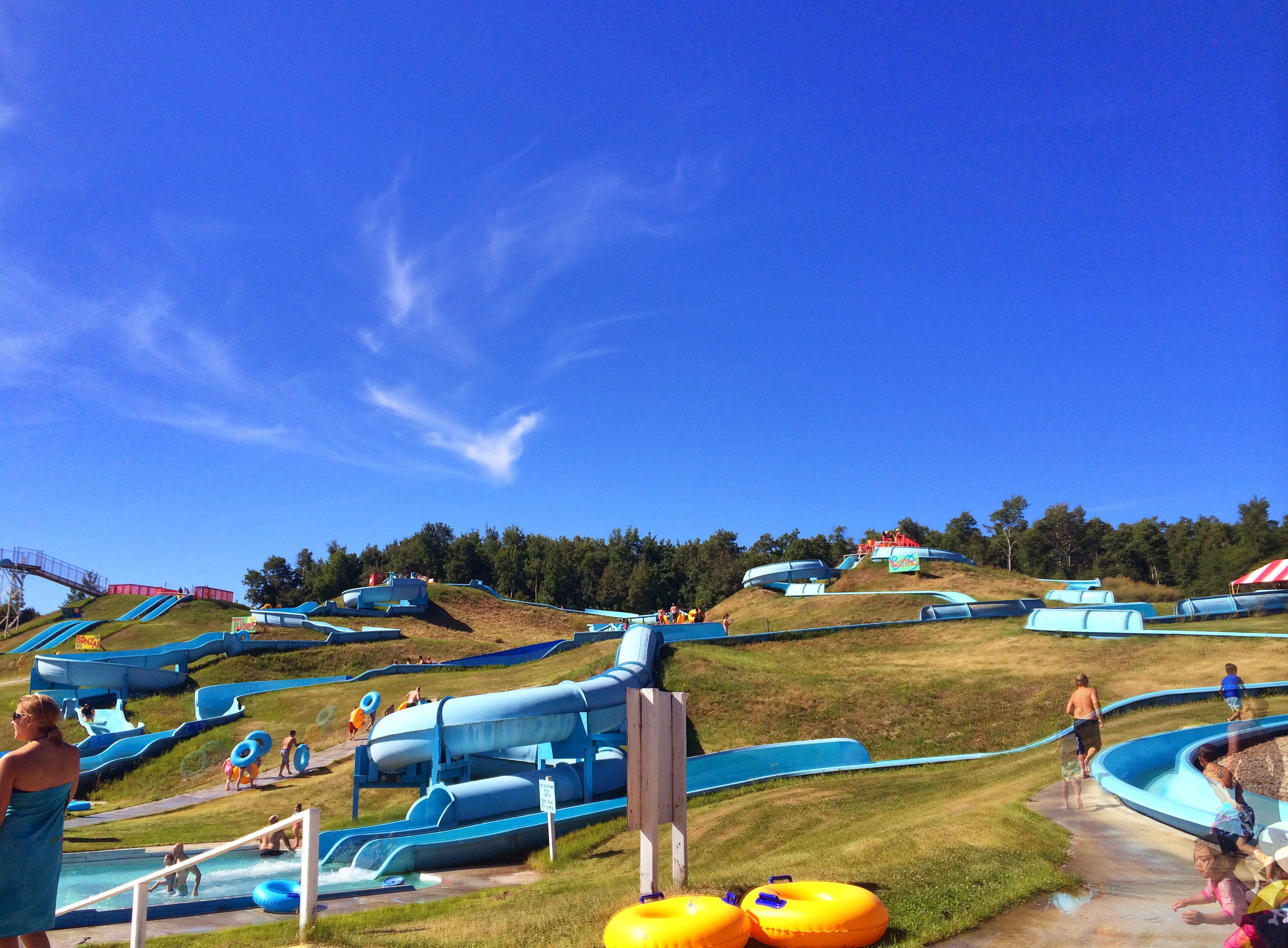
- Kenosee Superslides in 2016
- Interactive map of Kenosee Superslides
- Location: Moose Mountain Provincial Park, RM of Wawken No. 93, Saskatchewan, Canada
- Coordinates: 49.8320°N 102.2761°W
- Pools: 3 pools
- Water slides: 10 water slides
- Website: Official website

The Kenosee Superslides were a water park in Moose Mountain Provincial Park in Saskatchewan, Canada.

== History ==
The Kenosee Superslides were built in the summer of 1985, and opened in the summer of 1986.

The Kenosee Superslides were open from mid June to late August annually, drawing in large amounts of customers each season until their closure in 2020.

Visitors could choose from one of seven waterslides including the eight story Free Fall or spend time in other amenities like a lazy river, a hot tub, a beach volleyball court and a children's slide section.

The closure was ordered as a result of a Saskatchewan Health Authority determination that the park posed a concern to public health and safety.

The Saskatchewan government ordered the demolition of the park's structures in February 2026.

By late March 2026, the majority of the structures on the site had been removed.

== See also ==
- Kenosee Lake
- Tourism in Saskatchewan
- List of water parks in the Americas
