= Little Kenosee Lake =

Lake in Saskatchewan, Canada

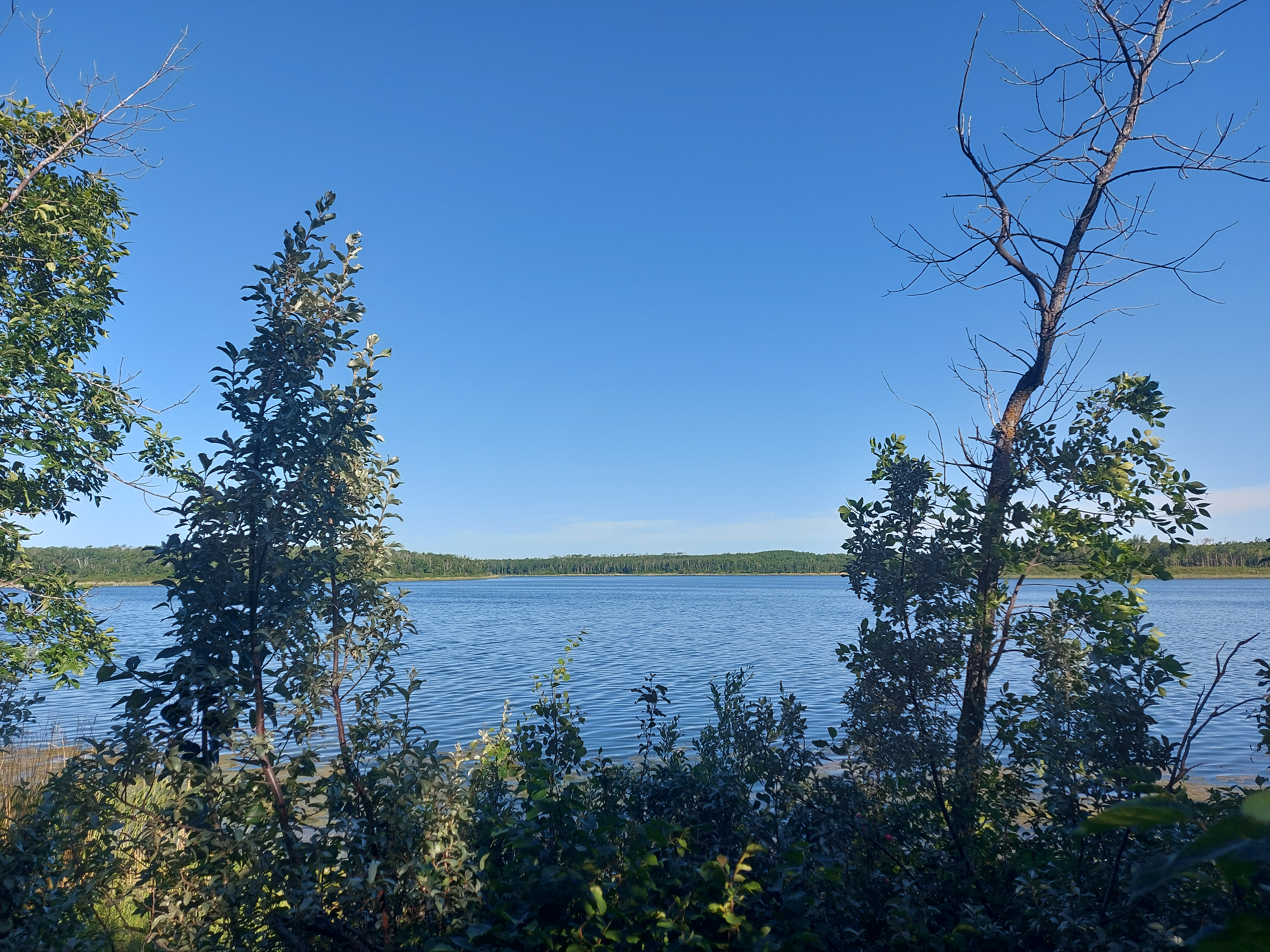
- Little Kenosee Lake

- Location in Saskatchewan Little Kenosee Lake (Canada)
- Location: Moose Mountain Provincial Park, Saskatchewan
- Coordinates: 49.8333°N 102.3338°W
- Part of: Red River drainage basin
- River sources: Moose Mountain Upland
- Primary outflows: Fish Creek
- Basin countries: Canada
- Surface area: 153.9 ha (380 acres)
- Surface elevation: 742 m (2,434 ft)
- Settlements: None

Little Kenosee Lake is a small lake in the south-eastern corner of the Canadian province of Saskatchewan. It is within Moose Mountain Provincial Park and the Moose Mountain Upland. The lake is kettle lake in the Palliser's Triangle and Prairie Pothole Region of Canada. Little Kenosee lake flows into the endorheic Kenosee Lake via Fish Creek. Most of the water that flows into Little Kenosee Lake comes from ground water run-off, such as from rain and melting snow. Fish Creek, the lake's outflow, is located on the southern shore. The lake and its facilities are accessed from Highway 219.

== Recreation ==
Little Kenosee Lake is the second largest lake in Moose Mountain Provincial Park and there are many recreational amenities in and around the lake. Along the south-eastern shore of the lake is the largest campground in the park, Fish Creek Campground. Along the southern shore is a picnic area with washrooms, a boat launch, and fishing dock. Jutting out of the southern shore is a large forested peninsula with a 3.4-kilometre loop hiking trail. In the winter, there's ice fishing and snowmobiling on the lake and surrounding trails.

== Gallery ==
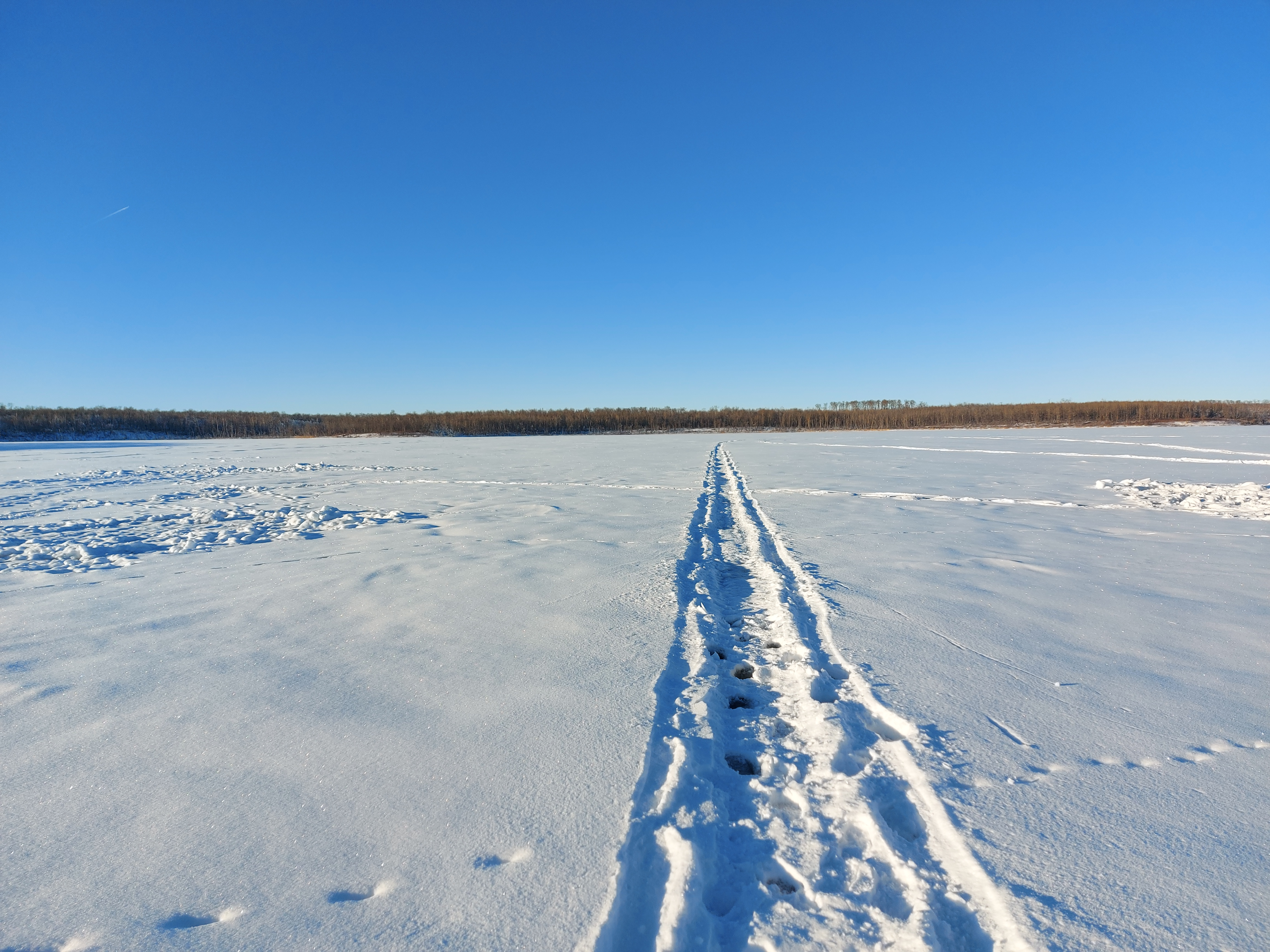
Snowmobile tracks on Little Kenosee Lake

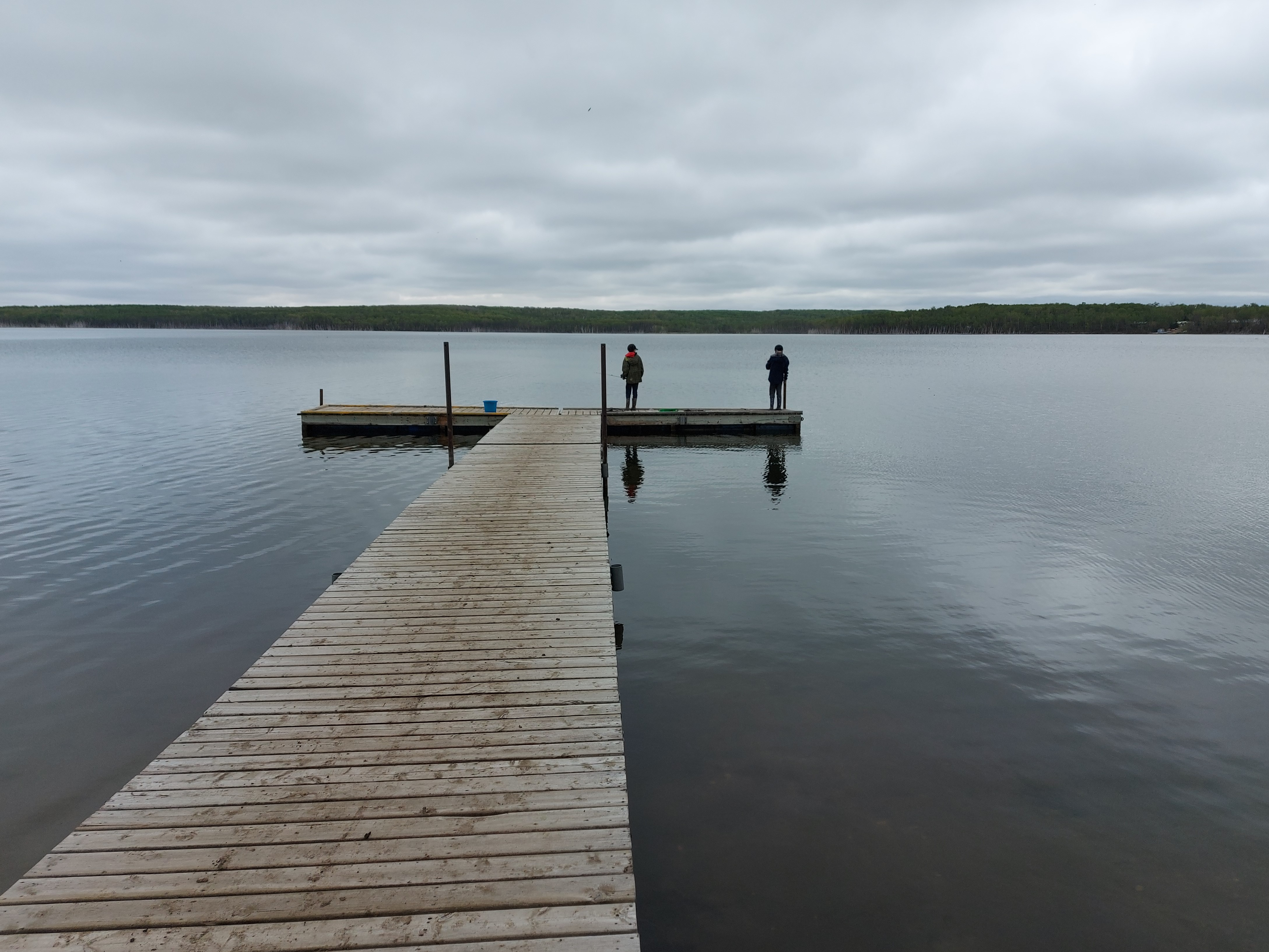
Fishing pier at Little Kenosee Lake

== Fish species ==
Commonly found fish in Little Kenosee include yellow perch and walleye. The lake is stocked regularly with fish.

== See also ==
- List of lakes of Saskatchewan
- List of place names in Canada of Indigenous origin
- Tourism in Saskatchewan
