= Rural Municipality of Wawken No. 93 =

Rural municipality in Saskatchewan, Canada

Wawken No. 93
- Rural municipality
- Rural Municipality of Wawken No. 93
- Location of the RM of Wawken No. 93 in Saskatchewan
- Coordinates: 49.927°N 102.180°W
- Country: Canada
- Province: Saskatchewan
- Census division: 1
- SARM division: 1
- Federal riding: Souris—Moose Mountain
- Provincial riding: Cannington; Moosomin
- Formed: January 1, 1913

Government
  - Reeve: Darrell Petterson
  - Governing body: RM of Wawken No. 93 Council
  - Administrator: Katelyn Ethier
  - Office location: Wawota

Area (2016)
  - Land: 766.57 km^{2} (295.97 sq mi)

Population (2016)
  - Total: 571
  - Density: 0.7/km^{2} (1.8/sq mi)
- Time zone: CST
  - Summer (DST): CST
- Postal code: S0G 5A0
- Area codes: 306 and 639

The Rural Municipality of Wawken No. 93 (2016 population: 571) is a rural municipality (RM) in the Canadian province of Saskatchewan within Census Division No. 1 and SARM Division No. 1. It is located in the southeast portion of the province.

== History ==
The RM of Wawken No. 93 incorporated as a rural municipality on January 1, 1913. Although possessing a sound inventory similar to many Saskatchewan place names of indigenous Algonquian origin, the name Wawken is in fact a portmanteau of Wawota and Kennedy, the RM's two main urban communities.

== Geography ==
=== Communities and localities ===
The following urban municipalities are surrounded by the RM.

Towns

- Wawota

Villages

- Kennedy
- Kenosee Lake

The following unincorporated communities are within the RM.

Localities

- Dumas
- Vandura

== Demographics ==
Population history (1981–2016)
Year	Pop.	±%
1981	765	—
1986	759	−0.8%
1991	737	−2.9%
1996	708	−3.9%
2001	643	−9.2%
2006	613	−4.7%
2011	559	−8.8%
2016	571	+2.1%
Source: Statistics Canada via Saskatchewan Bureau of Statistics

In the 2021 Census of Population conducted by Statistics Canada, the RM of Wawken No. 93 had a population of 614 living in 287 of its 554 total private dwellings, a change of 7.5% from its 2016 population of 571. With a land area of 743.5 km^{2} (287.1 sq mi), it had a population density of 0.8/km^{2} (2.1/sq mi) in 2021.

In the 2016 Census of Population, the RM of Wawken No. 93 recorded a population of 571 living in 250 of its 597 total private dwellings, a 2.1% change from its 2011 population of 559. With a land area of 766.57 km^{2} (295.97 sq mi), it had a population density of 0.7/km^{2} (1.9/sq mi) in 2016.

== Economy ==
Agriculture plays an important role in the RM.

== Attractions ==
- Moose Mountain Provincial Park

== Government ==
The RM of Wawken No. 93 is governed by an elected municipal council and an appointed administrator that meets on the second Thursday of every month. The reeve of the RM is Darrell Petterson while its administrator is Katelyn Ethier. The RM's office is located in Wawota.

== See also ==
- List of rural municipalities in Saskatchewan
- List of communities in Saskatchewan
