= Moose Mountain Provincial Park =

Provincial park in Saskatchewan, Canada

- IUCN category V (protected landscape/seascape)
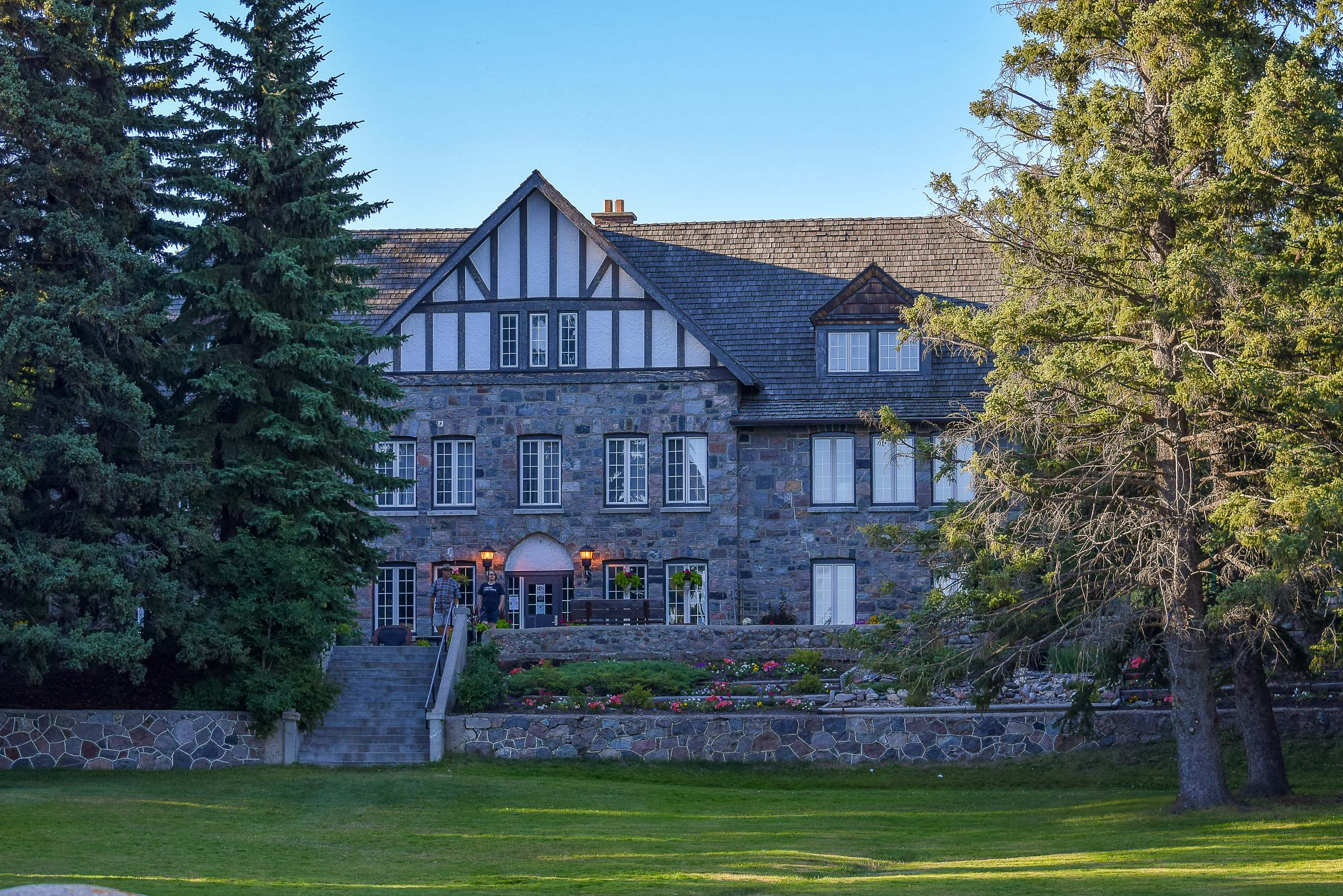
- Moose Mountain Chalet

- Location within Saskatchewan Location within Canada
- Interactive map of Moose Mountain Provincial Park
- Location: Saskatchewan
- Nearest town: Carlyle
- Coordinates: 49°49′16″N 102°22′34″W
- Area: 40,146 ha (99,200 acres)
- Established: 1931
- Governing body: Sask Parks

Moose Mountain Provincial Park is a provincial park in south-eastern Saskatchewan about 24 kilometres (15 mi) north of the town of Carlyle on the Moose Mountain Upland. It is one of Saskatchewan's few parks with a community inside the park as there are several subdivisions with both year-round and seasonal residents. The village of Kenosee Lake is completely surrounded by the park but is not part of the park.

== History ==
Long before the park was established, the forest and lakes on the plateau that the park is on had been an important source of resources for the local Indigenous people and early settlers. The forests provided shelter, firewood, fishing, and game. The lakes, especially Carlyle and Fish, provided recreation as, starting in the early 1900s, cabins, stores, and dance halls were being built. Seeing the importance of a "forest island" in the middle of the bald prairie, the Canadian government in 1906 designated the upland as a forest reserve under the Dominion Lands Branch through the Dominion Forest Reserves Act. In 1908, it was re-designated as Moose Mountain Forest Preserve to protect the forests from being cleared for farm and pasture land. The Act also ensured the forest could be managed sustainably. In 1911, the federal government created the Dominion Parks Branch. Moose Mountain Forest Preserve came under management of the Dominion Forests Division of this new Dominion Parks Branch.

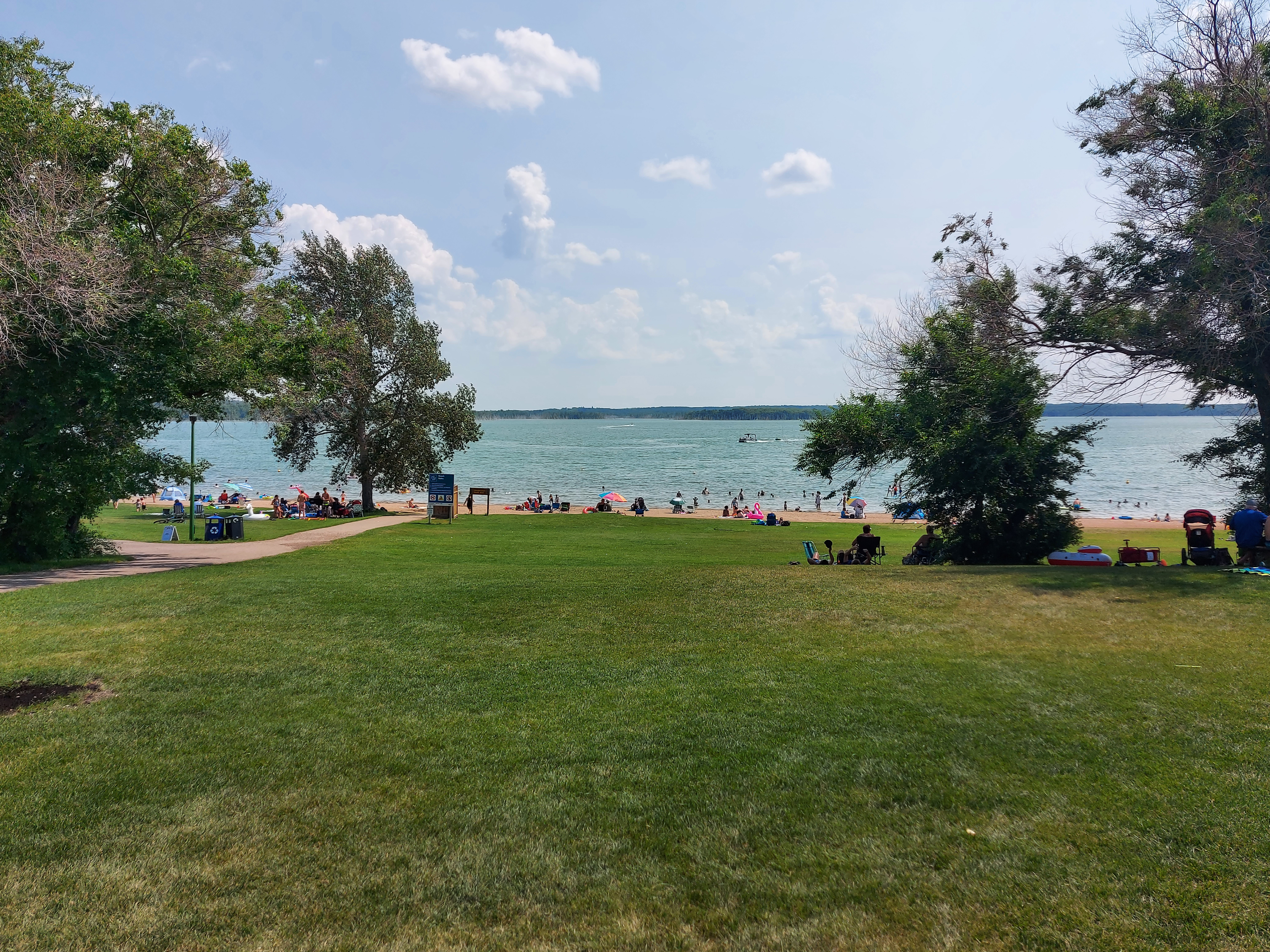
Kenosee Lake Main Beach

In 1930, the federal government transferred control of natural resources over to the western provinces under the Natural Resources Acts. The Saskatchewan government then set up its own Department of Natural Resources. With the Great Depression causing high unemployment, many government work programmes were set up, including the creation of six provincial parks. Moose Mountain Provincial Park was among these six original parks.

=== Founding of the park ===
Moose Mountain Provincial Park was designated a park in 1931. From then until 1935, several work projects around the park were completed. Work began in the spring of 1931 with the building of Moose Mountain Chalet, landscaping, building of Main Beach on Kenosee Lake, and a road going south connecting the park to Carlyle Lake and the town of Carlyle, and going north to Kennedy. Construction of an 18-hole golf course began in 1932 and was completed by 1933. The park was officially established on 1 July 1932 with Saskatchewan Premier J.T.M. Anderson present at the construction site for the ribbon cutting and official opening. Deputy minister John Barnett had also come to the park and renamed Fish Lake to Kenosee Lake:

"We'll change the name of this place to Kenosee Lake...that is Indian for fish. We'll build a chalet here, on that rise above the depression making this into a sunken garden."

To protect the forest and the park, firebreaks and fire lookout towers were built in strategic spots around the upland and the park.

Three subdivisions, McNaughton, Sunnybank, and Sandy Bay, were built alongside Kenosee Lake with cottages made available to private owners. Years later, more subdivisions were added, including Acoose, Chechsip, and Beaver.

==== Moose Mountain Chalet ====
A stonemason named Charles John Parker from Ontario was brought in to build the three-storey Moose Mountain Chalet. The chalet, which was opened up as an upscale boutique hotel with a rotunda on the main floor, a dining room and fireplace on the second floor, and bedrooms on the third floor was completed by the summer of 1933. The outer rock façade used local rocks found around the lake and on two of the lake's islands, Hog and Maple. Along with the chalet, 14 cabins were built nearby in 1932. Four of the cabins still stand and are now the Artisan Colony. On 1 November 1933, a fire started in the chimney and the interior was gutted by fire. The rock façade and concrete survived and the chalet was able to be rebuilt. It re-opened for the summer season of 1934.

The hotel portion of the chalet closed its rooms in 1981 and the restaurant closed in the late 1980s. The first floor was transformed into the Visitor's Centre and the second floor became administrative offices.

The Moose Mountain Chalet and Cabins were officially designated a Provincial Heritage Property on 20 January 2012.

== Attractions ==
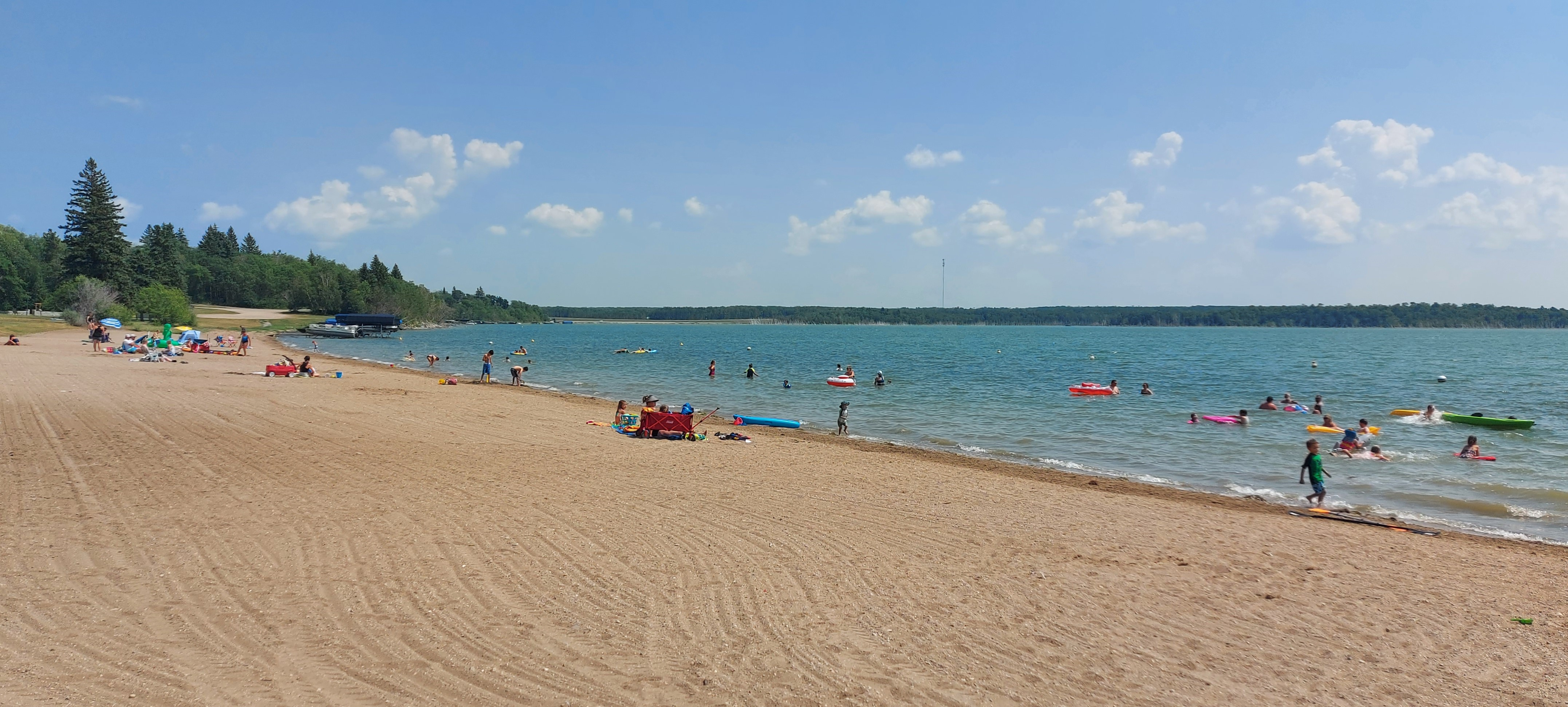
Kenosee Lake Main Beach

Kenosee Lake is the largest body of water in the park and serves as its central tourist attraction. Seasonal recreational activities in and around the lake and park include fishing, hunting, hiking, cycling, swimming, boating, water sports, cross-country skiing, snowmobile riding, horseback riding, miniature golf, and golfing. There is also a baseball diamond, which is where the Kenosee Cubs of the Saskota Baseball League play. In the winter, Kenosee Lake Lookout is the top of the tobogganing hill. At the bottom of the hill, there is a warm up shack and fire pits. Every February on Family Day an event called Moose Mountain Family Fun Day is held at the hill and on the frozen lake. There's toboganning, skating, cross-country skiing, curling, hot dogs, and roasted marshmallows.

At the main beach, Sask Aquatic Adventures has a water adventure park set up. It is one of several in Saskatchewan.

On the east side of the park, just off Highway 9, is Kenosee Superslides. The slides closed indefinitely in 2020.

=== Core Area ===
The Core Area, sometimes referred to as "Kenosee Park", is where many of the main attractions and services are located. Allison Park Store, Kenosee Inn & Cabins, Moose Mountain Chalet, Artisan Colony, Masters Mini Golf, tennis courts, laundry services, picnic areas, and Kenosee Lake Main Beach are all located there.

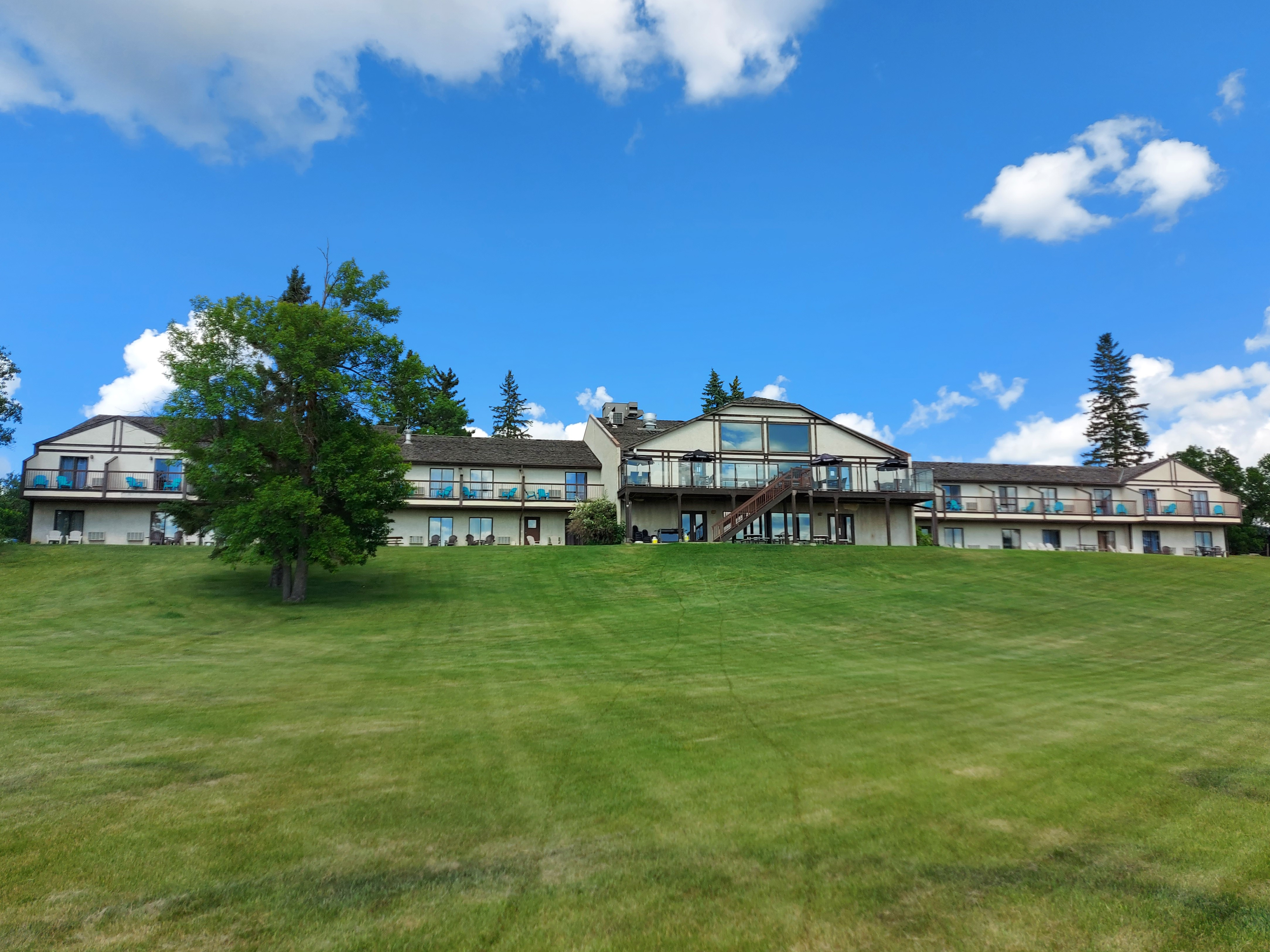
Kenosee Inn & Cabins

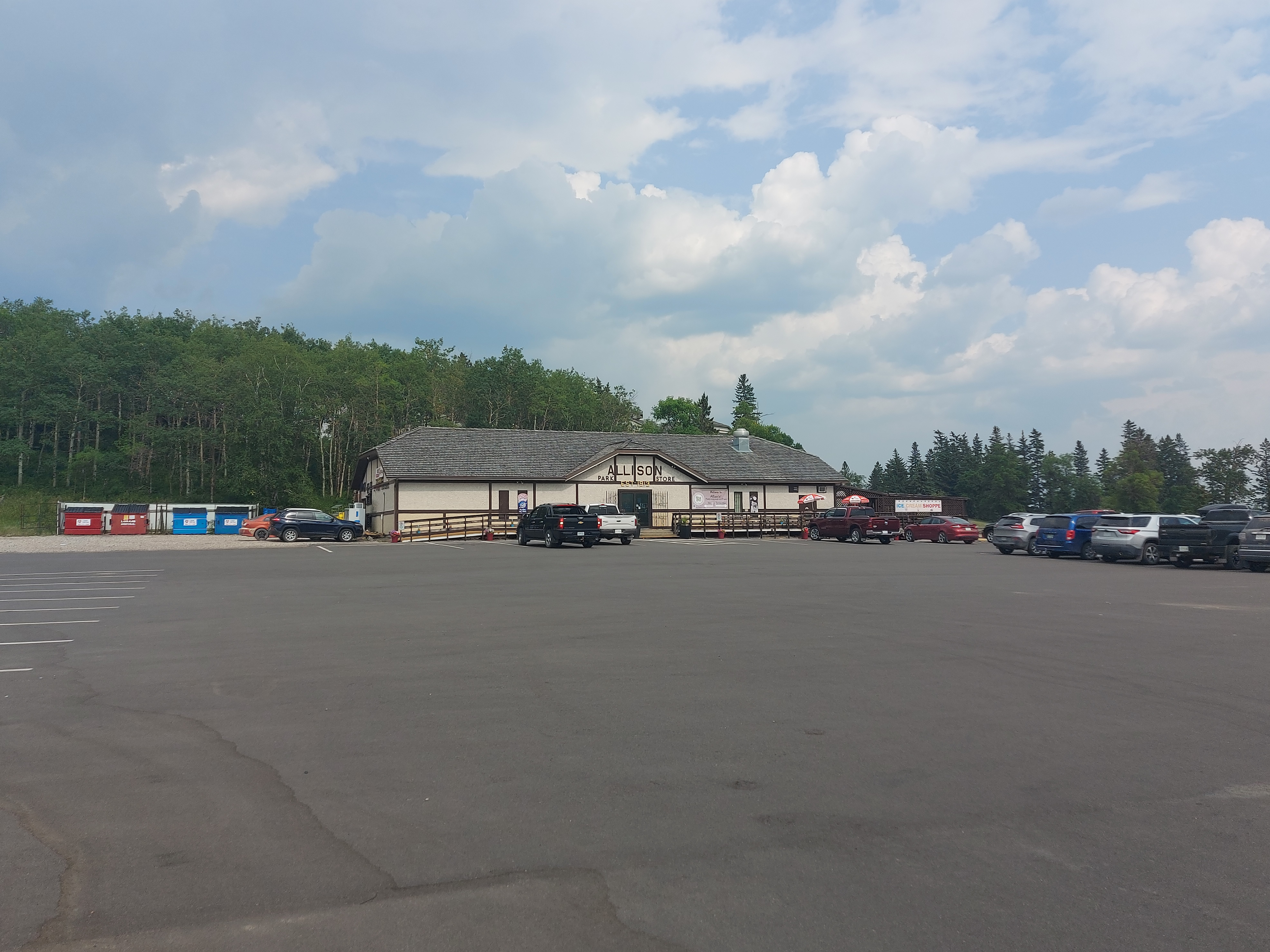
Allison Park Store, Core Area

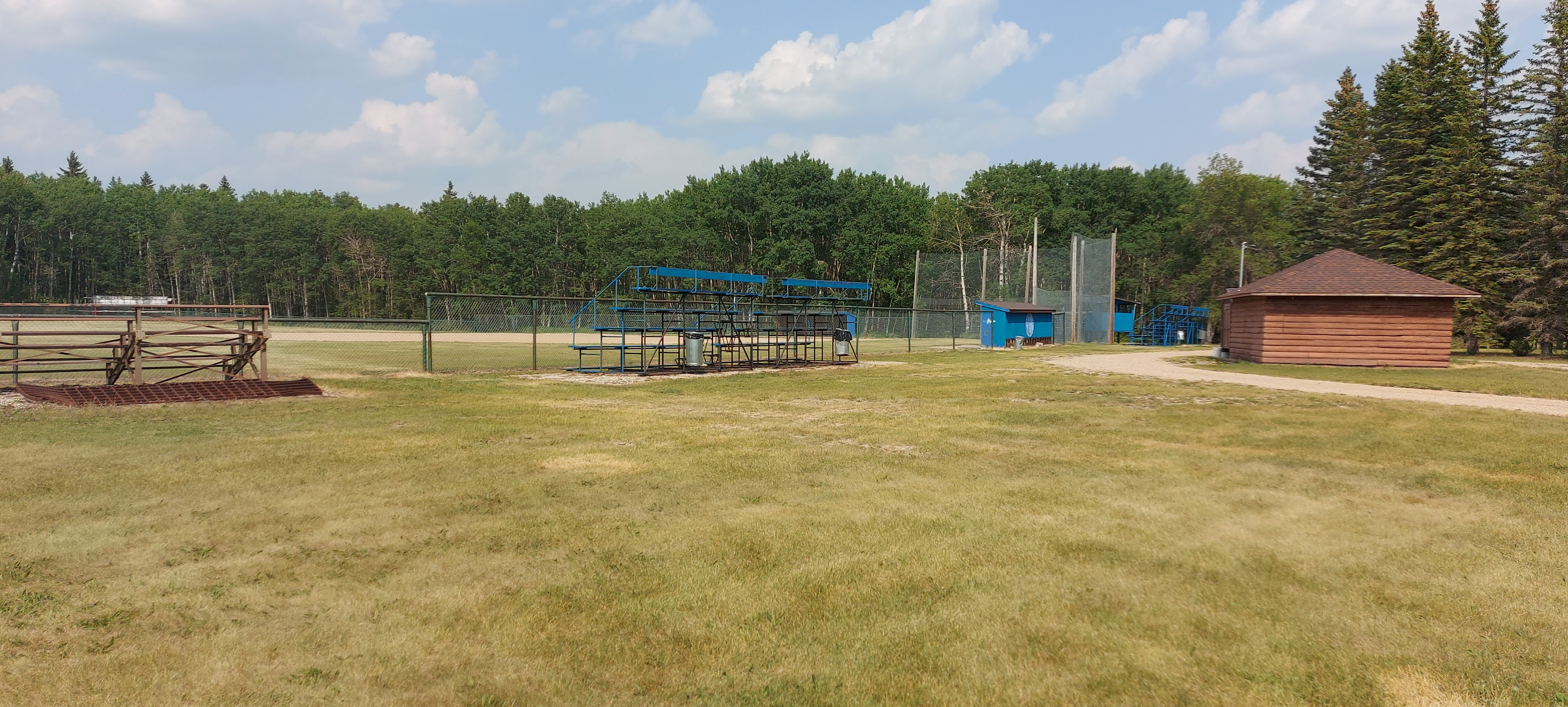
Baseball diamond at Moose Mountain

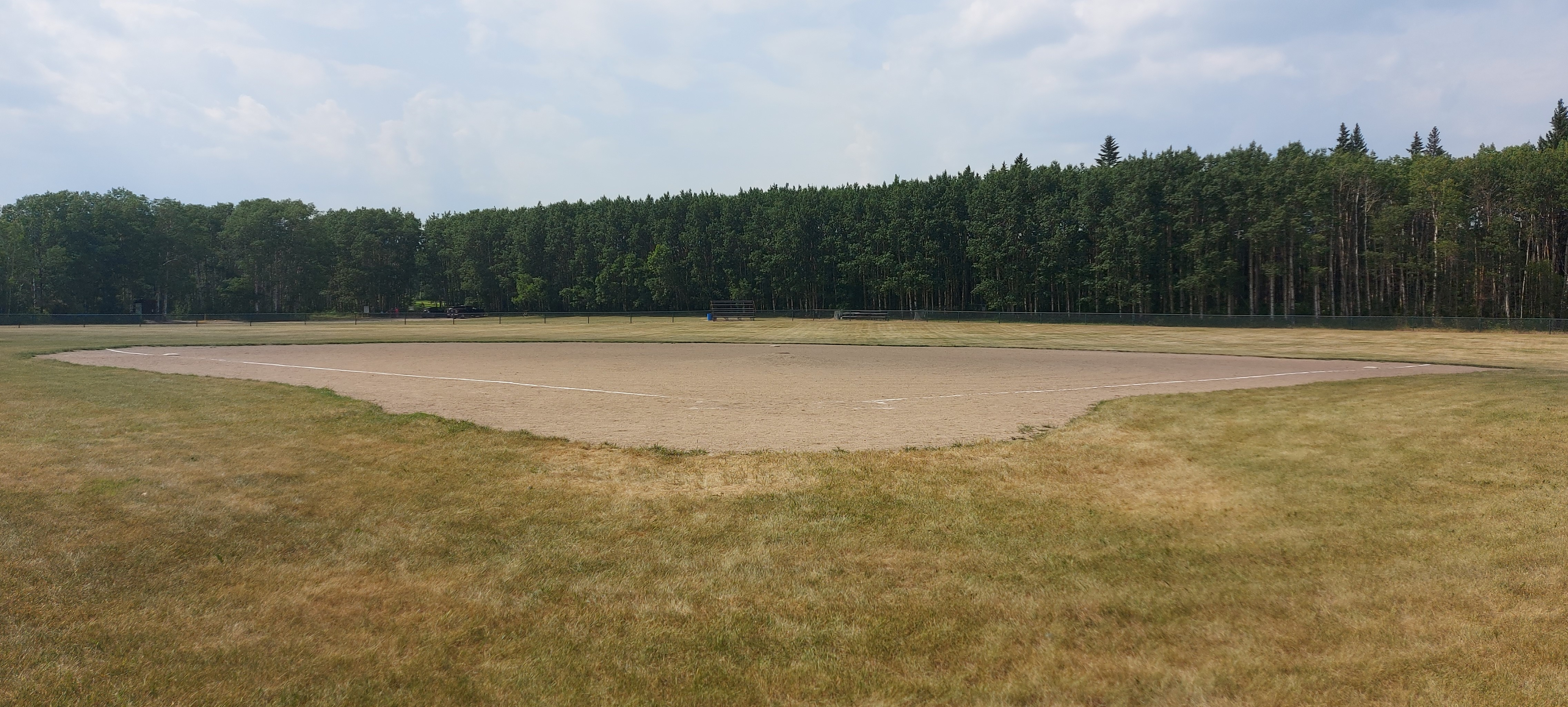
Baseball diamond at Moose Mountain

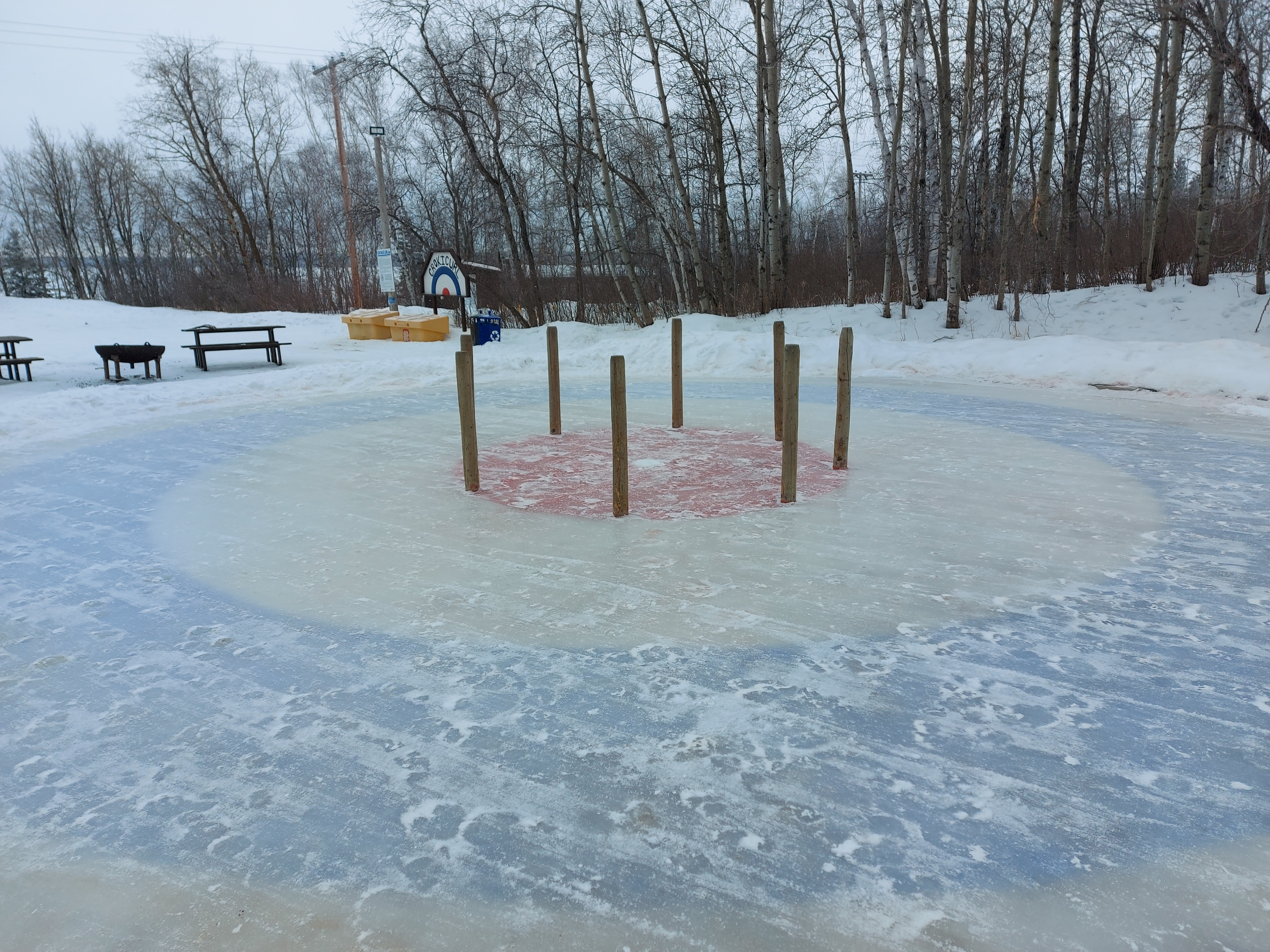
Crokicurl

=== Accommodations and camping ===
There are two main campsites in the park. The smaller of the two, Lynwood with 30 sites, is along the north shore of Kenosee Lake. The main campsite, Fish Creek, takes up most of the isthmus between Little Kenosee and Kenosee Lakes. It is divided into four sections, A through D, and there are well over 300 campsites, many of them full-service. Poplar Lane and Aspen Meadows, just to the west of Fish Creek, are group camping sites. Inside the village of Kenosee Lake is a full-service private campground.

In the core area of the park, overlooking Kenosee Lake, is the Kenosee Inn & Cabins. Besides a grand view of the lake, it features 30 hotel rooms, 23 cabins, a conference room, and a restaurant.

On the west side of the lake, along the shore of Christopher Bay at the former site of the Arcola Resort, there are three Christian summer camps:

- Kenosee Lake Bible Camp
- Clearview Christian Camp
- Kenosee Boys & Girls Camp

=== Golf Kenosee ===
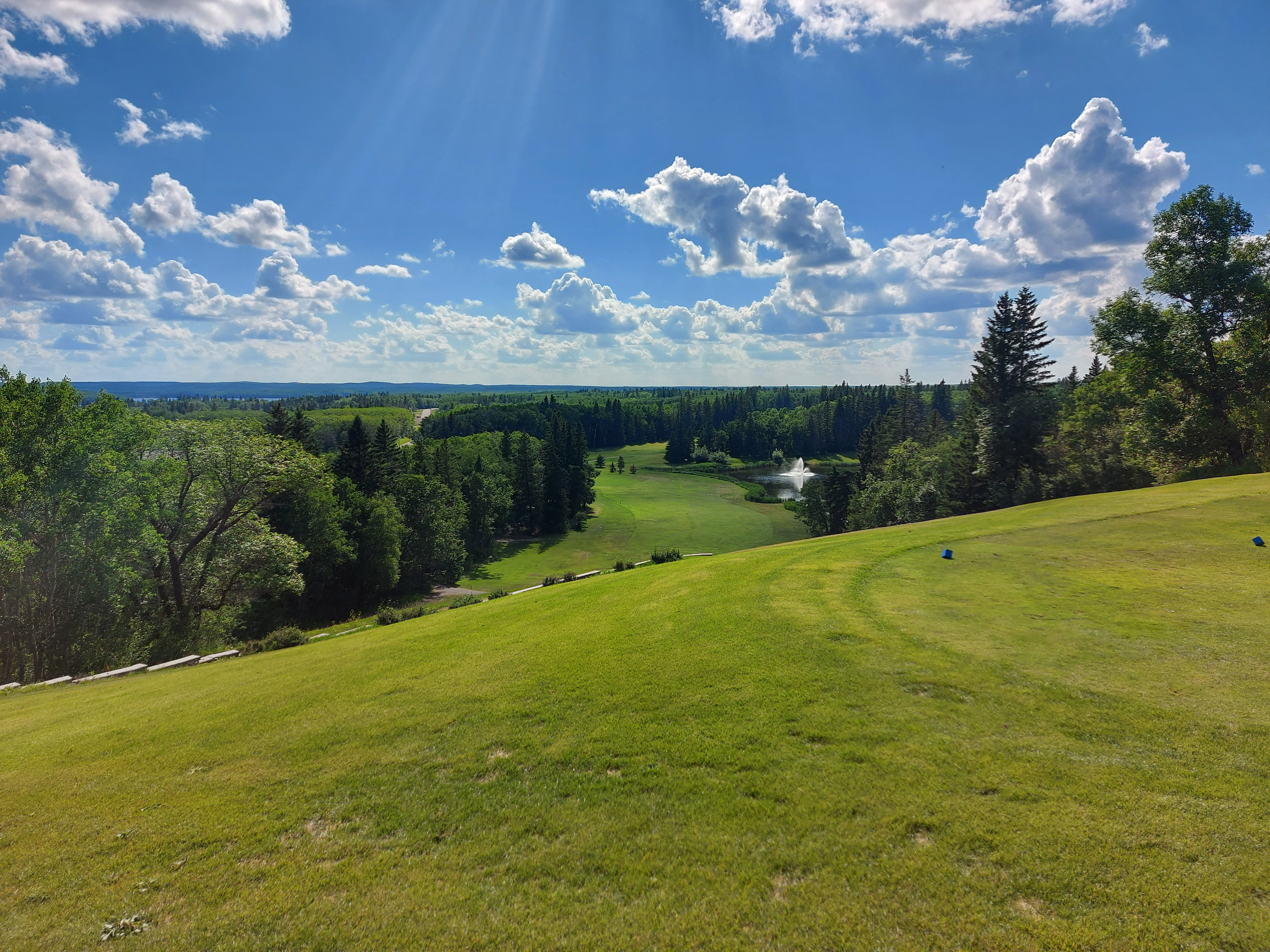
Fairway 1 on Golf Kenosee

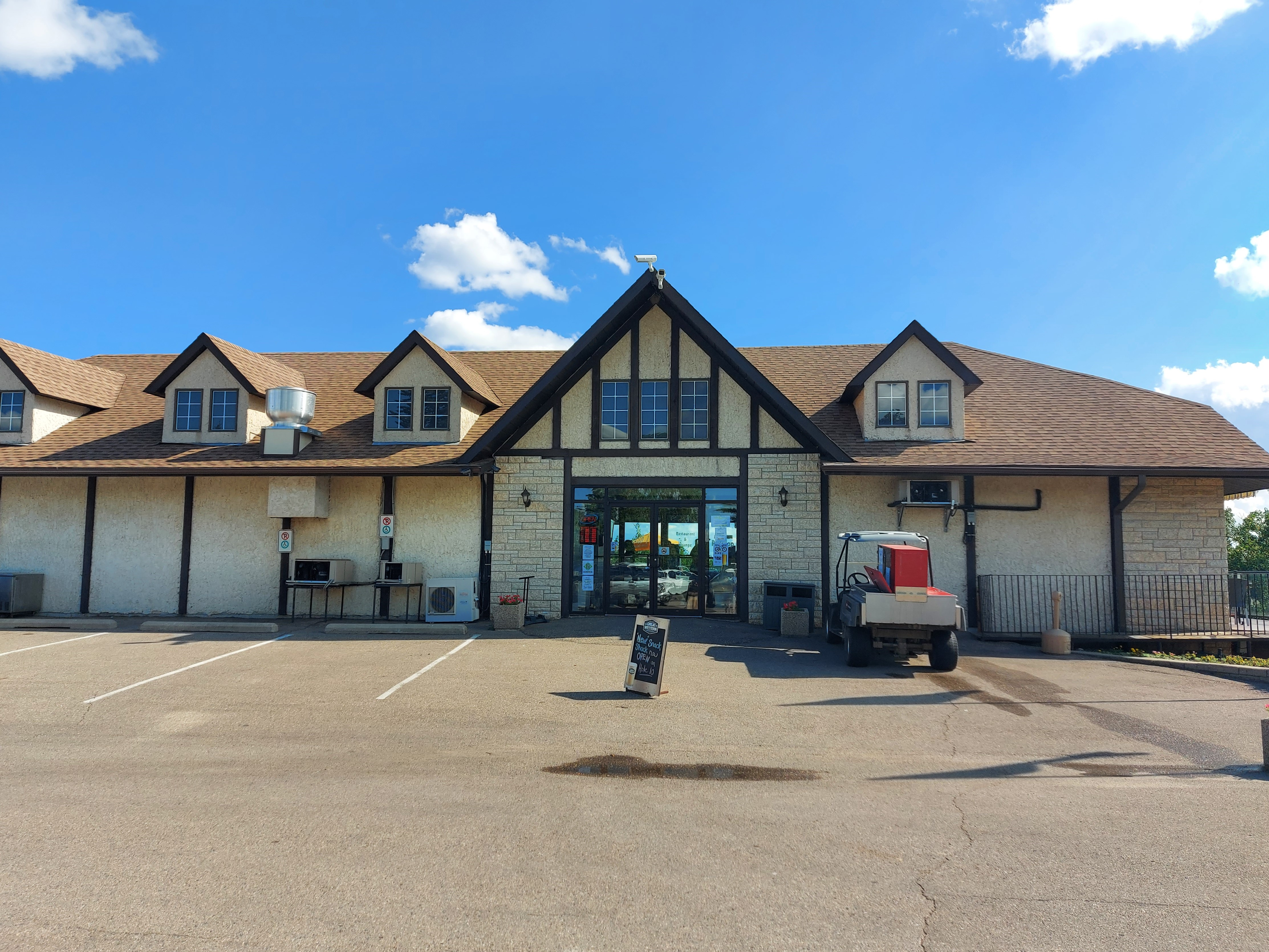
Golf Kenosee Clubhouse, built in 1952

The 18-hole golf course was constructed between 1932 and 1933 and at the time was one of Canada's premier golf courses. It was built in conjunction with the chalet with the goal of attracting wealthy tourists to the park. The endeavour was a huge success. The original clubhouse was replaced in 1952. In the mid-1980s, Golf Kenosee was established when a group of 135 stakeholders raised $1.35 million to take over the golf course from Moose Mountain Provincial Park.

The water level at Kenosee Lake had been dropping for decades. It got so low that in some winters, the shallow lake would freeze nearly to the bottom killing off the fish. Low lake levels not only hurt sport fishing at the lake, it also affected water quality for swimming and other water activities. The end result was that fewer people were coming to the park and, coupled with other newer golf courses being built nearby, Golf Kenosee suffered.

A Special General Meeting of Shareholders was held in 2002 to try to figure out a solution and to discuss options to once again make the golf course a premier destination. It was decided that a full course renovation and redesign was the best option. A five-year plan was initiated to complete the redesign that would allow the course to remain open during the renovations. The total cost in cash expenditures was almost one million dollars. However, the actual cash value, including donated labour, equipment, and materials, was closer to two million dollars.

The redesign coupled with rising lake levels has meant that Golf Kenosee and Moose Mountain Provincial Park once again became a go-to destination.

=== Trail system ===
The park features a variety of trails for hiking, biking, ATVing, and snowmobiling. Permits are required for ATVs and are restricted to designated areas between 15 June and the end of Labour Day. Along the main road through the park is a wide biking/walking trail that starts at the Core Area and goes to the main campsites. Other main hiking trails include:

- Birch Forest Trail goes around Pickerel Point (2 km)
- Peninsula Trail traverses the southern shore of Little Kenosee Lake
- White-tailed Deer Trail traverses the eastern and northern shore of Little Kenosee Lake (3 km)
- Blue Heron Trail is west of Little Kenosee Lake
- Beaver Lake Trail starts at the ball diamond and circles Beaver Lake (4.5 km)
- Youell Lake Trail is an extension of Beaver Lake Trail that heads east towards Youell Lake (2.9 km)

In total, there's more than 120 km (75 mi) of groomed snowmobile trails, 50 km (31 mi) of cross-country ski trails, and 10 km (6.2 mi) of snowshoe trails.

== Lakes of Moose Mountain Provincial Park ==
Besides the main lakes of Kenosee and Little Kenosee, there are numerous small named and unnamed lakes throughout the park. Many of these lakes are accessible off the main trails and road systems. Other notable lakes in the park include Beaver, Muskrat, Youell, and Crane.

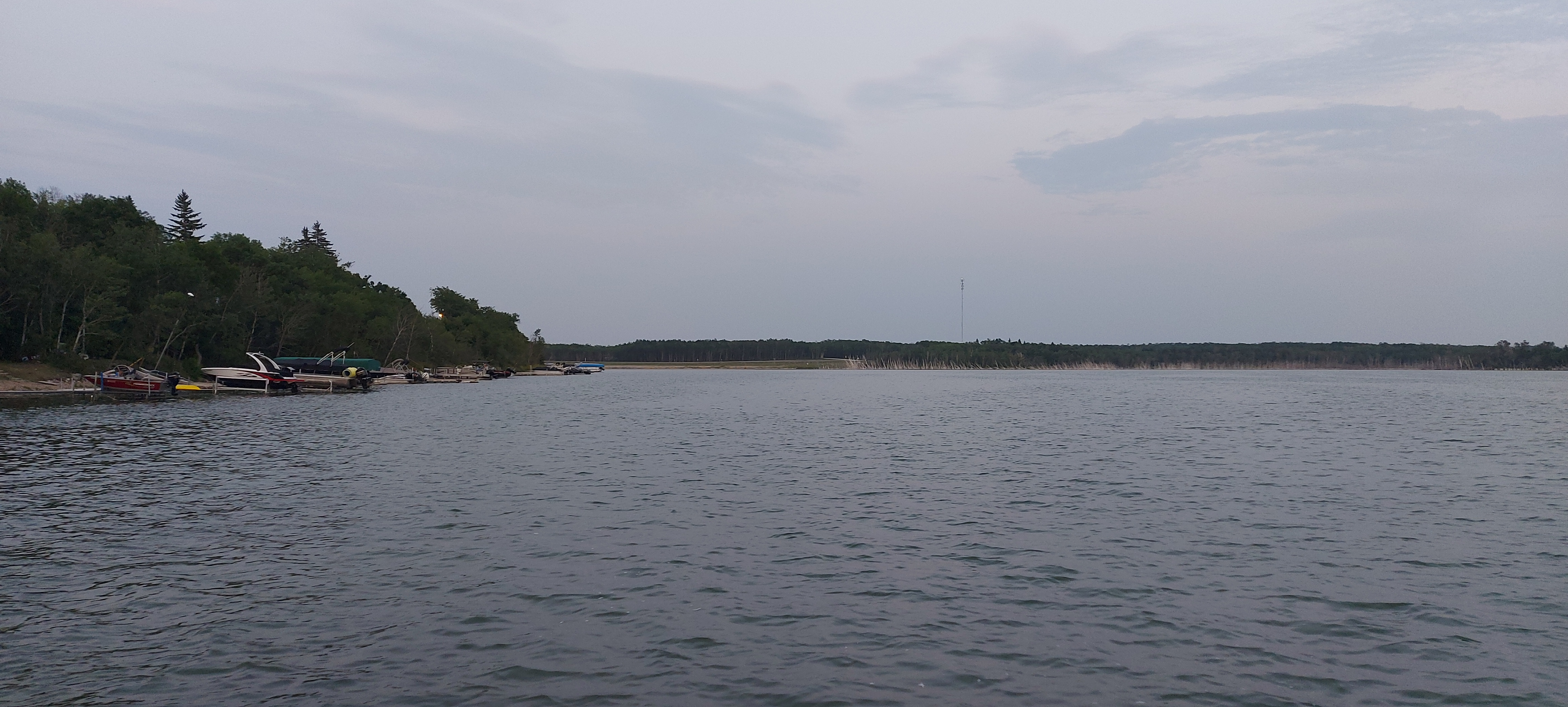
Kenosee Lake

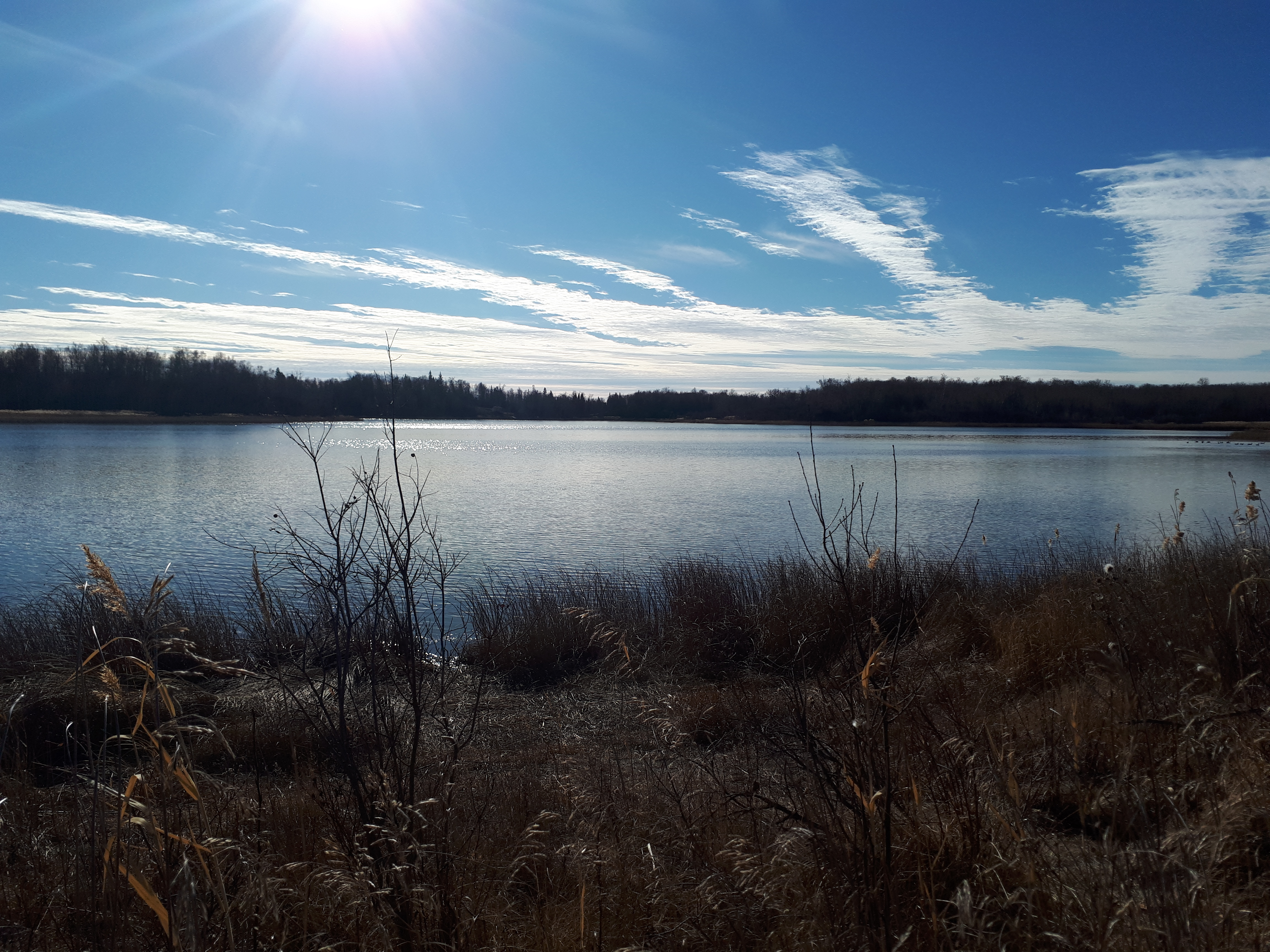
Beaver Lake

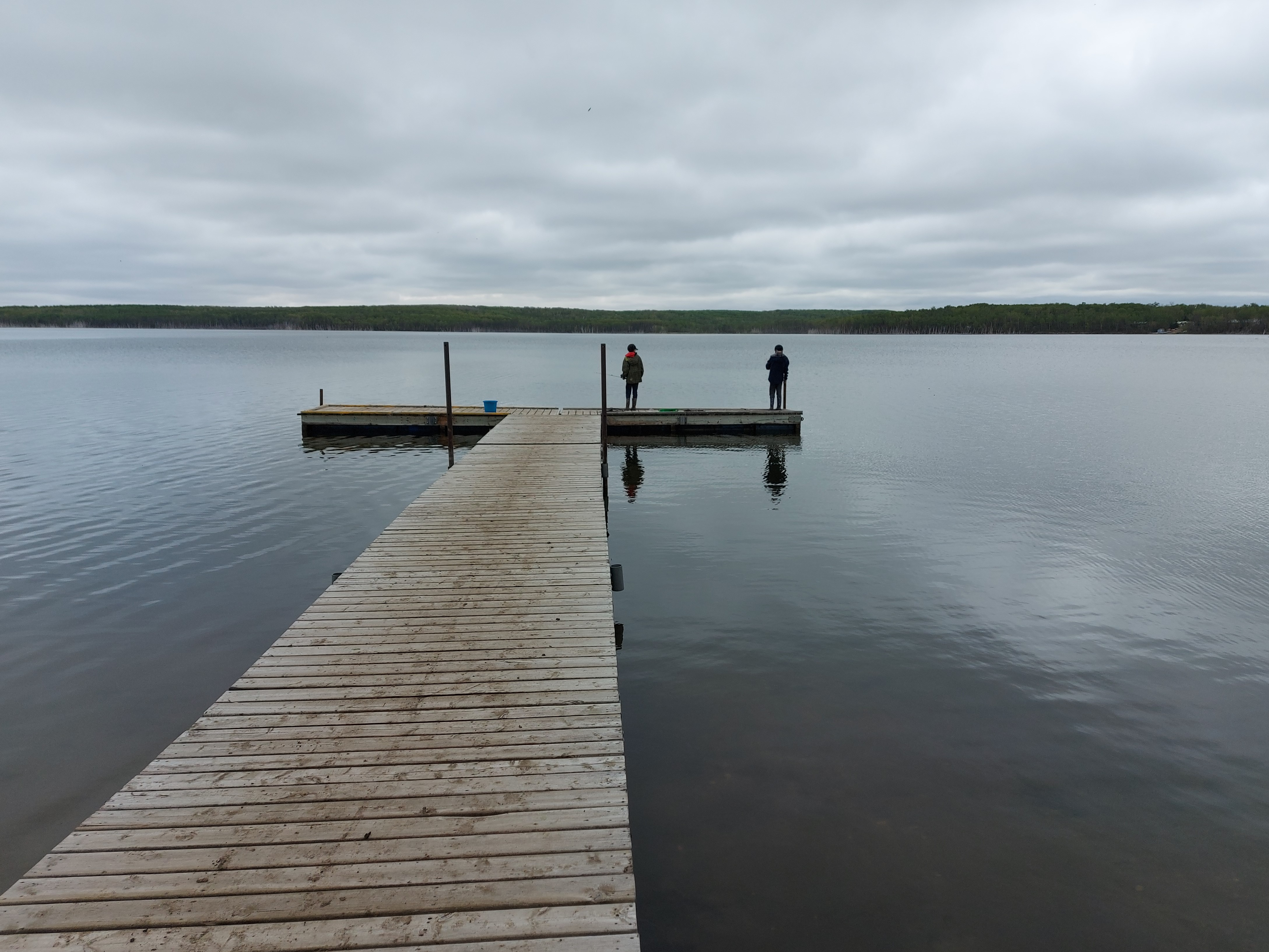
Little Kenosee Lake

== Flora and fauna ==
The park biome is aspen parkland which consists of aspen, poplars, and spruce interspersed with prairie grasslands, which provides abundant wildlife viewing opportunities. Fish species include walleye, yellow perch, northern pike, burbot, and white sucker. Moose Mountain is also great for wildlife finds such as moose, elk, and many species of birds.

== See also ==
- List of protected areas of Saskatchewan
- Red Coat Trail
- Cannington Manor Provincial Park
- Tourism in Saskatchewan
