= Browning, Saskatchewan =

Community in Saskatchewan, Canada

Coordinates: 49°27′08″N 102°38′02″W

Location of Browning in Saskatchewan

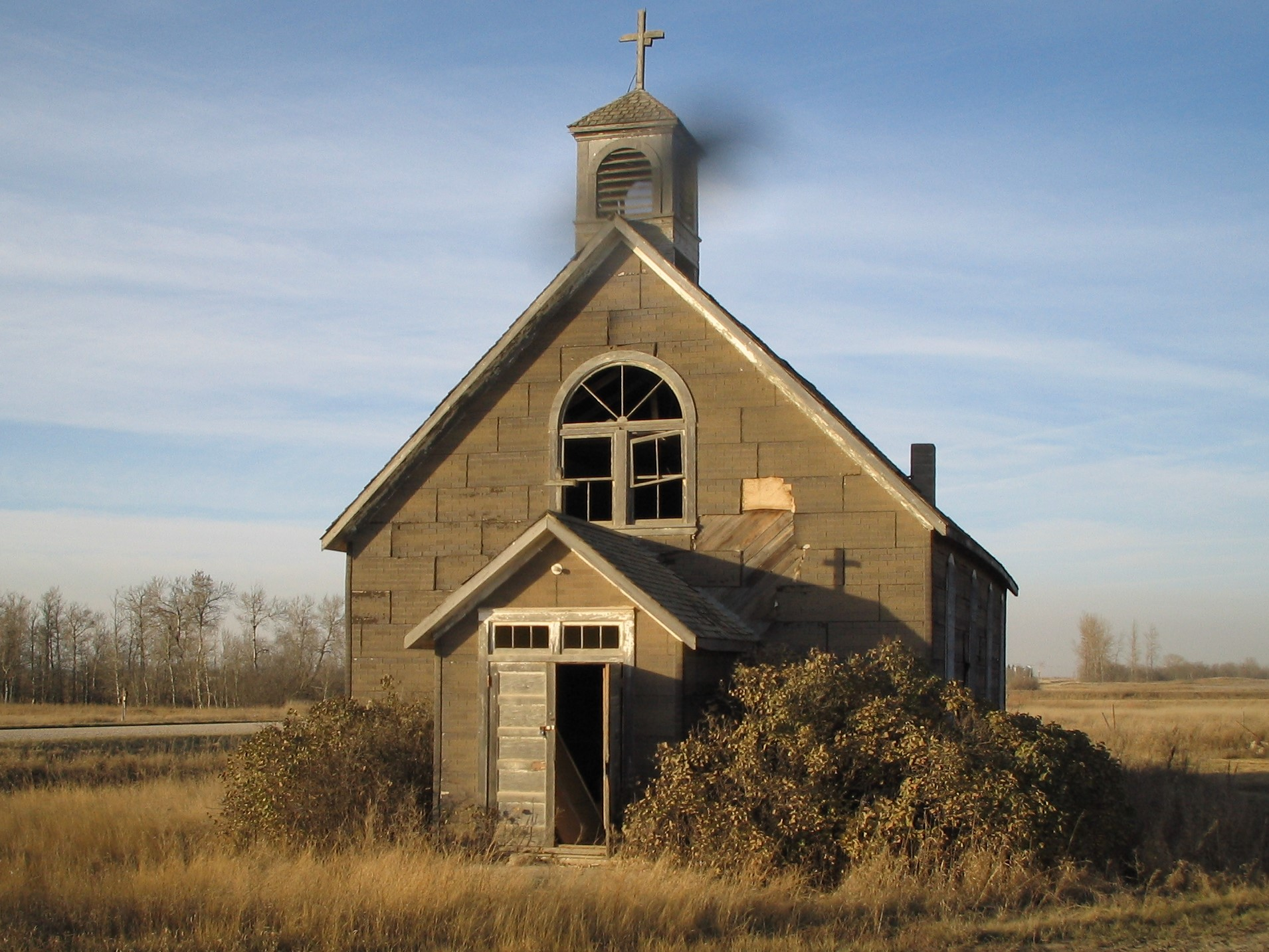
St. Anthony's Catholic Church c. 2011, Browning, Saskatchewan

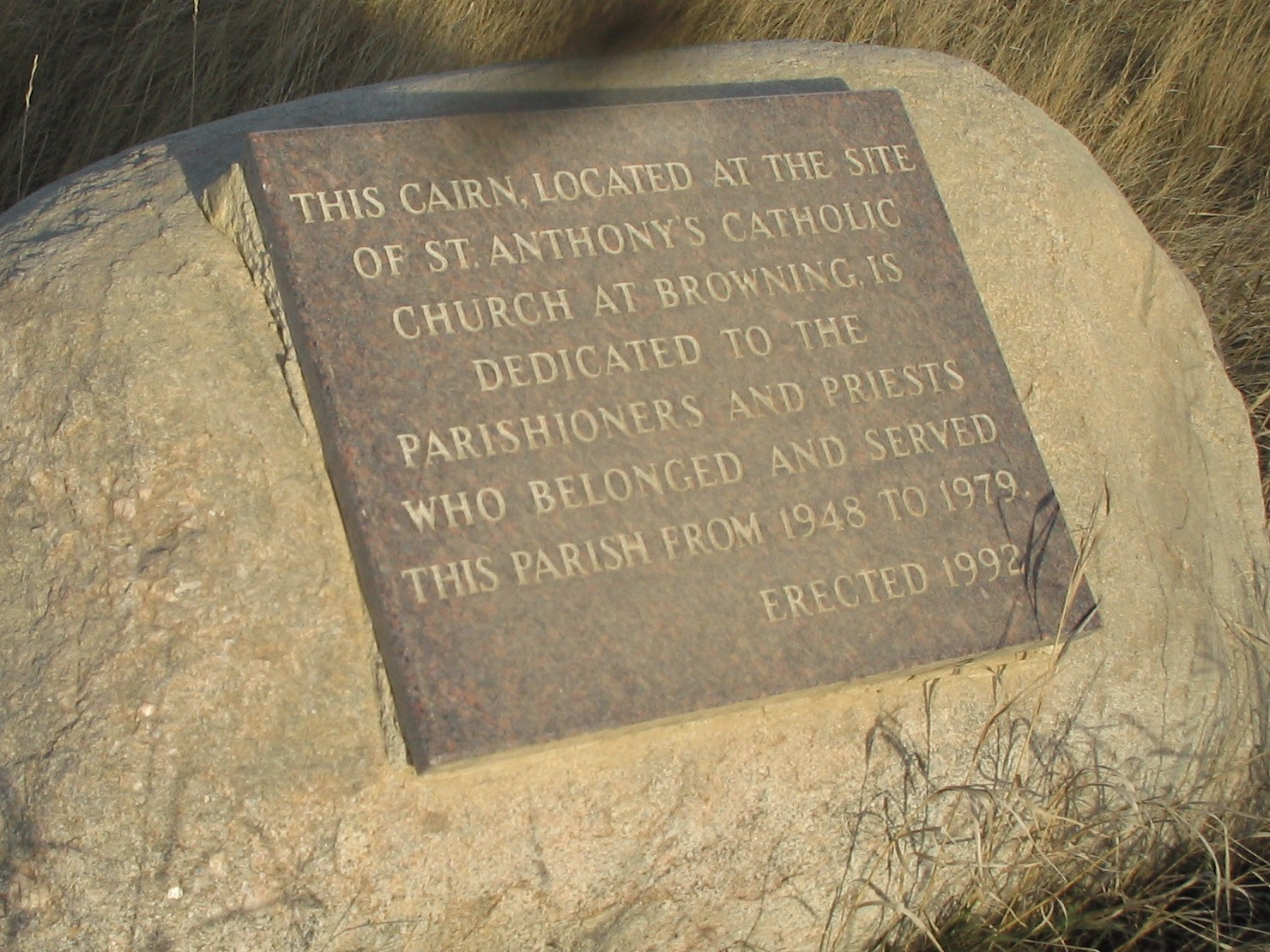
Cairn commemorating the parishioners of St. Anthony's Catholic Church

Browning is an unincorporated community in the province of Saskatchewan, Canada.

The community was named after poet Robert Browning and is part of "Poet's Corner" along the CN Railway line in south-east Saskatchewan. Other poetic towns include Carlyle (Thomas Carlyle), Wordsworth (William Wordsworth), Service (Robert W. Service), Cowper (William Cowper), and Lampman (Archibald Lampman).

There is no "town" now and the only building still standing from the original townsite is the old school, which is abandoned and boarded up. There still are a few farms nearby and the Browning Cemetery. The abandoned church, St. Anthony's Catholic Church, burnt down in the spring of 2012. The post office, which opened on 1 February 1911, closed on 31 March 1970.

== See also ==
- List of communities in Saskatchewan
- list of ghost towns in Saskatchewan
