= Manor, Saskatchewan =

Village in Saskatchewan, Canada

Village of Manor
- Village
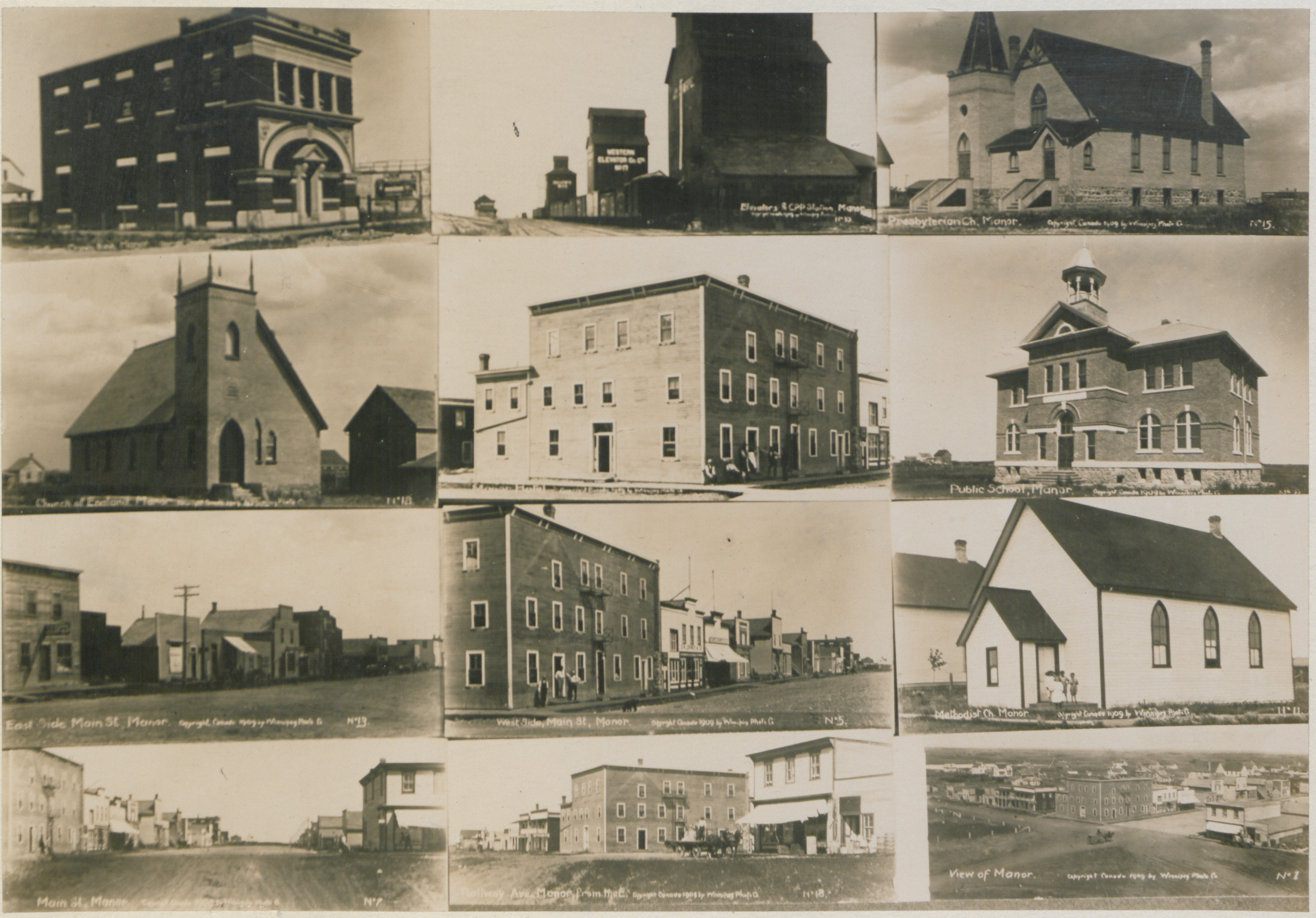
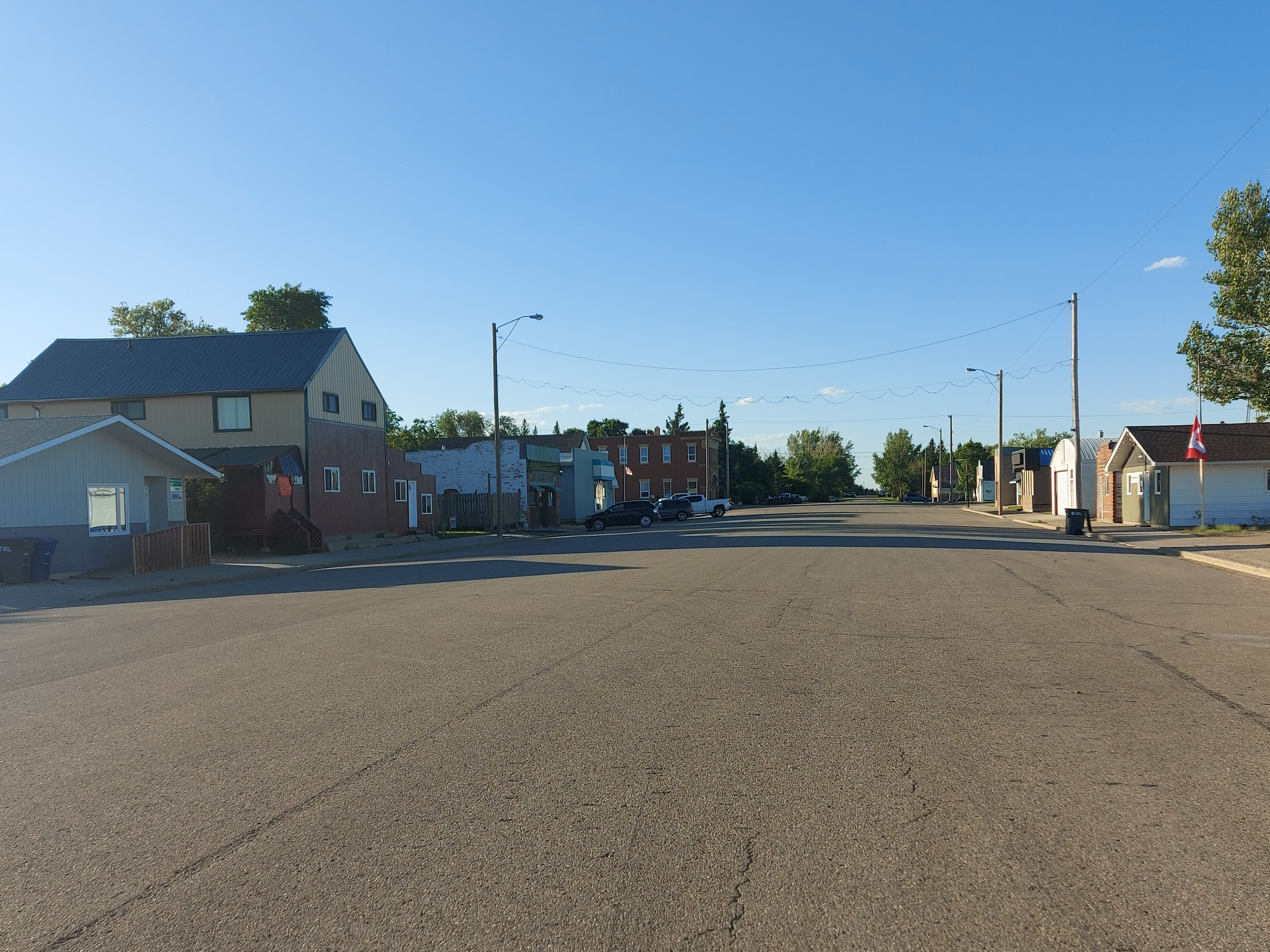
- Views of Manor, 1909 Downtown Manor, 2021

- Location of Manor in Saskatchewan Village of Manor (Canada)
- Coordinates: 49.6049°N 102.0838°W
- Country: Canada
- Province: Saskatchewan
- Region: Saskatchewan
- Census division: 1
- Rural Municipality: Moose Mountain No. 63
- Incorporated (Village): 1902

Government
  - Mayor: Lucille Dunn
  - Administrator: Lorna Hill
  - Governing body: Manor Village Council

Area
  - Total: 2.79 km^{2} (1.08 sq mi)

Population (2006)
  - Total: 312
  - Density: 109.3/km^{2} (283/sq mi)
- Time zone: CST
- Postal code: S0C 1R0
- Area code: 306
- Highways: Highway 13 / Highway 603

Manor (2016 population: 295) is a village in the Canadian province of Saskatchewan within the RM of Moose Mountain No. 63 and Census Division No. 1. The Manor Museum (1904) is designated a Municipal Heritage Property under the provincial Heritage Property Act.

== History ==
Manor incorporated as a village on 15 April 1902.

== Demographics ==
Population history (1981–2016)
Year	Pop.	±%
1981	368	—
1986	419	+13.9%
1991	326	−22.2%
1996	347	+6.4%
2001	305	−12.1%
2006	312	+2.3%
2011	322	+3.2%
2016	295	−8.4%
Source: Statistics Canada via Saskatchewan Bureau of Statistics

In the 2021 Census of Population conducted by Statistics Canada, Manor had a population of 305 living in 138 of its 165 total private dwellings, a change of 3.4% from its 2016 population of 295. With a land area of 2.58 km^{2} (1.00 sq mi), it had a population density of 118.2/km^{2} (306.2/sq mi) in 2021.

In the 2016 Census of Population, the Village of Manor recorded a population of 295 living in 128 of its 165 total private dwellings, a −9.2% change from its 2011 population of 322. With a land area of 2.79 km^{2} (1.08 sq mi), it had a population density of 105.7/km^{2} (273.9/sq mi) in 2016.

== See also ==
- Cannington Manor Provincial Park
- List of communities in Saskatchewan
- List of villages in Saskatchewan
