= Lampman =

Town in Saskatchewan, Canada

- Town
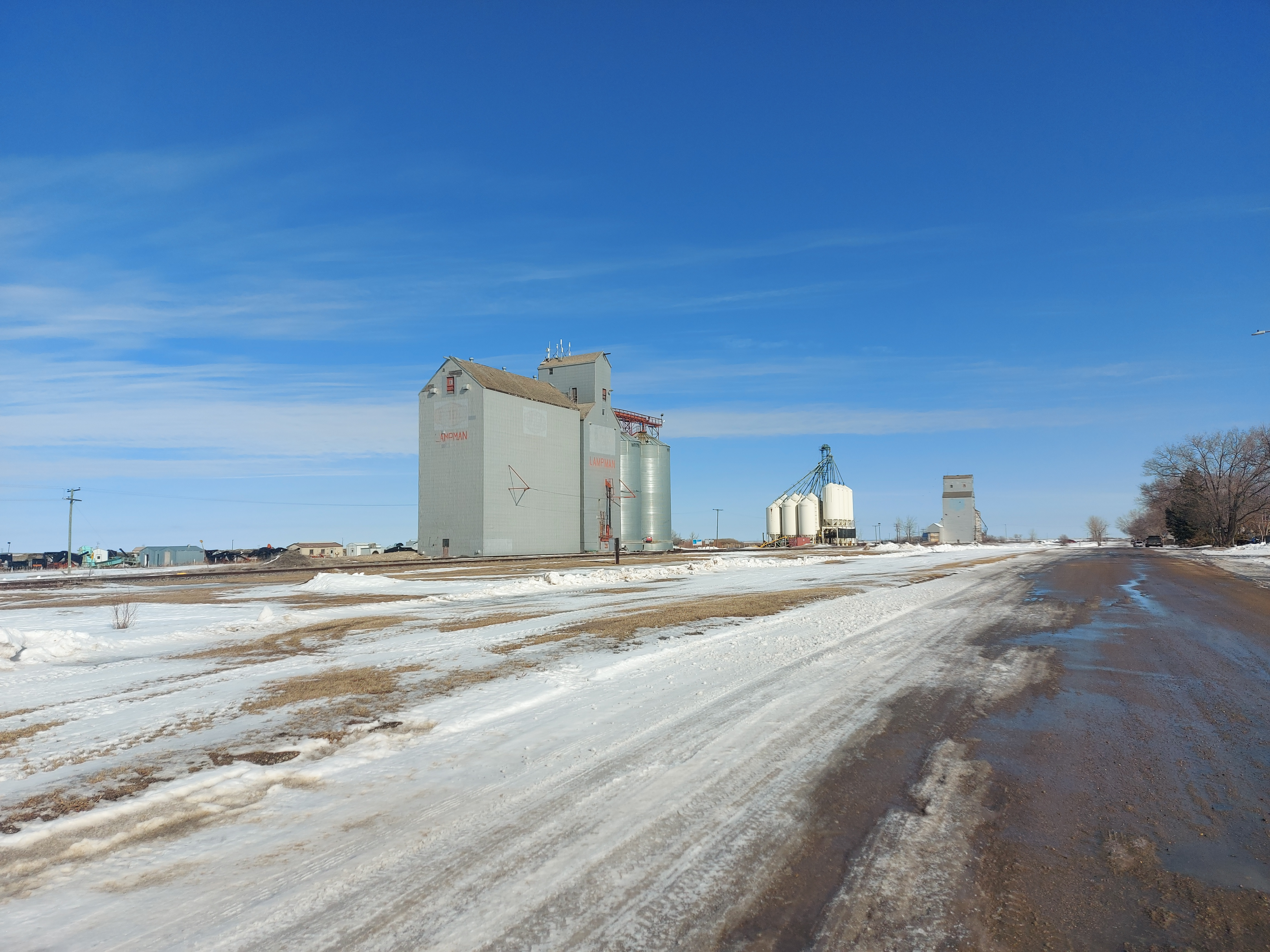
- The grain elevators in Lampman

- Location within Saskatchewan Location within Canada
- Coordinates: 49.3773°N 102.7621°W
- Country: Canada
- Province: Saskatchewan
- Region: Southeast
- Census division: Division No. 1
- Rural municipality: Browning No. 34
- Post office founded: 1910-05-01
- Incorporated (Village): 1910
- Town: 1963

Government
  - Mayor: Scott Greening

Population (2021)
  - Total: 673
- Time zone: CST
- Postal code: S0C 1N0
- Area code: 306
- Highways: Highway 361 / Highway 605
- Website: townoflampman.ca#con

Lampman is a town of 673 people in the south-east part of the Canadian province of Saskatchewan, roughly 30 miles north-east of Estevan.

To the north-west of Lampman, is Lake Roy, which is a shallow lake that often floods into town. Lampman's water supply is obtained from two deep wells that go through a water treatment system.

== History ==
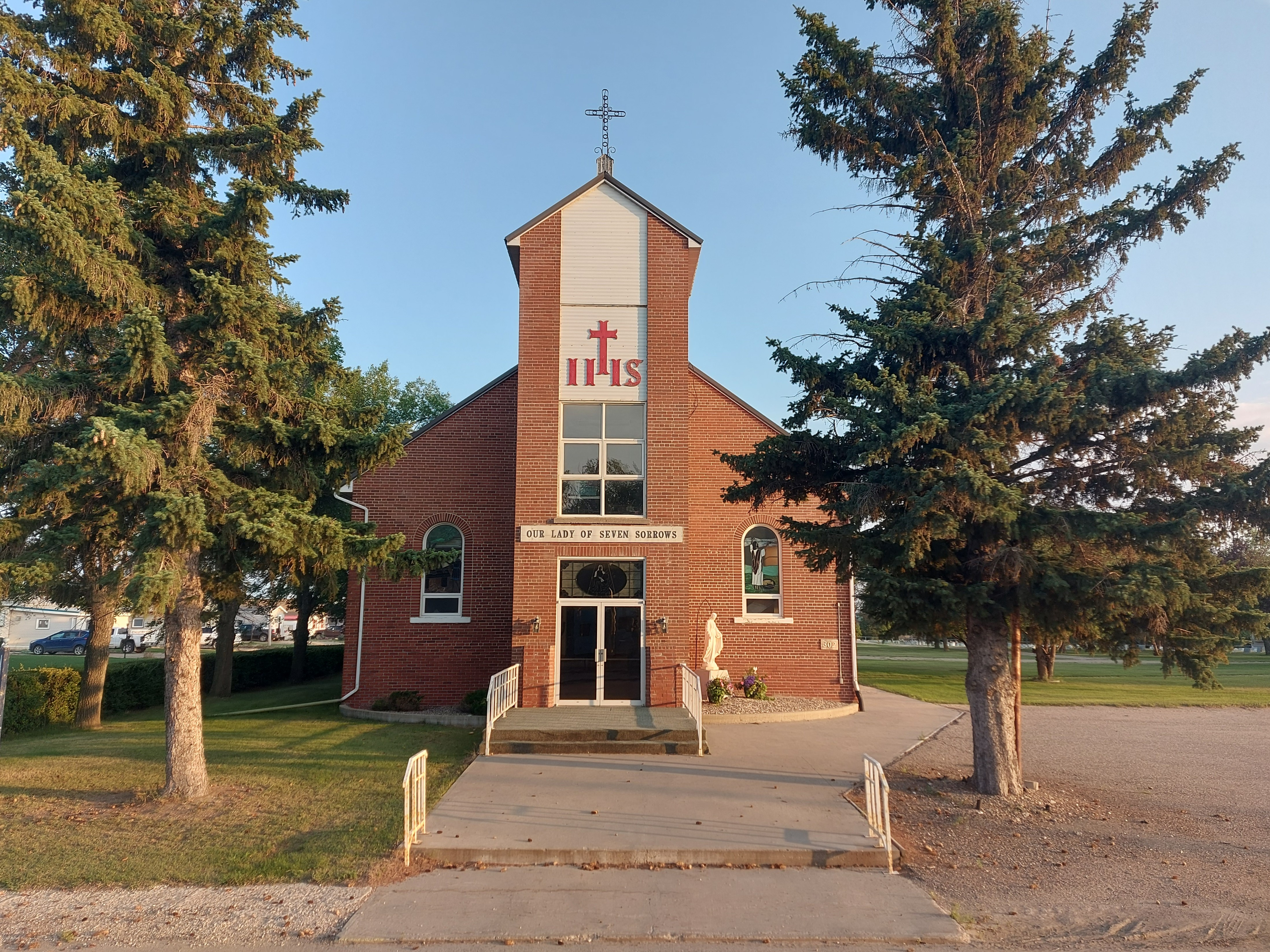
Our Lady of Seven Sorrows church in Lampman

The village of Lampman was founded on September 13, 1910. It gained the status of town on June 1, 1963. It was named for Canadian poet Archibald Lampman, one of the Confederation Poets. It is also part of "Poet's Corner" in south-east Saskatchewan. Several communities and stops along the CN Railway in this part of the province were named after famous British and Canadian poets. Some of the other places include, Carlyle (Thomas Carlyle), Browning (Robert Browning), Service (Robert W. Service), Cowper (William Cowper), and Wordsworth (William Wordsworth).

== Demographics ==
In the 2021 Census of Population conducted by Statistics Canada, Lampman had a population of 673 living in 271 of its 327 total private dwellings, a change of −0.3% from its 2016 population of 675. With a land area of 2.13 km^{2} (0.82 sq mi), it had a population density of 316.0/km^{2} (818.3/sq mi) in 2021.

== Education ==
Lampman has one school that covers Kindergarten through grade 12.

== Sports and recreation ==
Lampman has a community complex that includes an outdoor swimming pool, ice hockey arena, curling rink with four sheets of ice, and five baseball diamonds. The town also has a racetrack, golf course, campground, parks, and a walking path. The Lampman A's baseball team was inducted into the Saskatchewan Baseball Hall of Fame on August 18, 2012.

== Services and transportation ==
Lampman has volunteer ambulance service, volunteer fire department, and emergency rescue.

The town is serviced by a freight railway line, grain elevator, Lampman Airport (CJQ2), and two highways, Highway 361 and Highway 605.

== See also ==
- List of communities in Saskatchewan
- List of towns in Saskatchewan
