= Wordsworth, Saskatchewan =

Wordsworth
- Unincorporated
- Location within Saskatchewan
- Coordinates: 49.5485071°N 102.3672717°W
- Country: Canada
- Province: Saskatchewan
- Region: South-east
- Census division: 1
- Rural Municipality: Moose Mountain
- Elevation: 604 m (1,981 ft)
- Time zone: CST
- Postal code: S0N 2G0
- Area code: 306
- Highways: Highway 13; Highway 9
- Railways: Great Western Railway

Wordsworth, formerly Curt Hill, is an unincorporated locality in Moose Mountain Rural Municipality No. 63, Saskatchewan, Canada. It is named after the English poet, William Wordsworth and is part of "Poet's Corner" along the CN Railway line in south-east Saskatchewan. Other poetic towns include, Carlyle (Thomas Carlyle), Browning (Robert Browning), Service (Robert W. Service), Cowper (William Cowper), and Lampman (Archibald Lampman).

The name Curt Hill comes from the first postmaster, Curt Messer. Messer was the post master from 1 June 1902 until 30 September 1910. On 31 July 1911, the Curt Hill postoffice "closed" only to be reopened the next day, 1 August 1911, in the general store as Wordsworth. The postoffice remained open until 28 June 1968 when the last postmaster, Thorun Jensen, resigned.

Like many small Canadian prairie communities, Wordsworth grew quickly in its early years. By the late 1920s, there was a train station, gas station, general store, post office, a one room-schoolhouse, and at least one grain elevator. Also like many prairie communities, after years of growth, came years of decline. At one point, three different grain elevators existed in Wordsworth. By 1976, they were all gone.

Very few people still live in Wordsworth. The curling rink is closed, main street is over grown and empty, and while there is still an active railway, it does not stop there.

== See also ==
- List of communities in Saskatchewan
