= Carlyle station =

Railway station in Saskatchewan, Canada

Carlyle
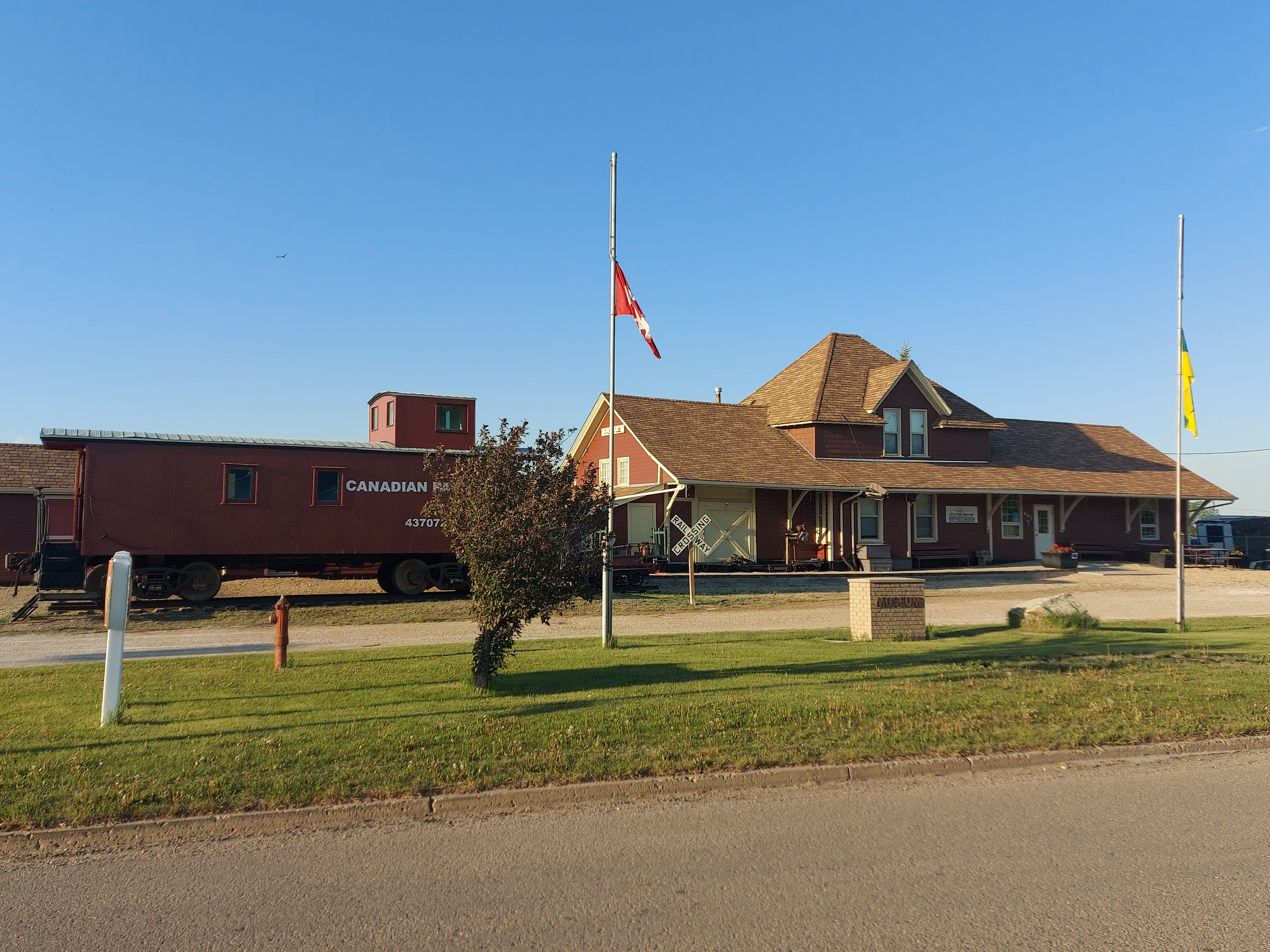

General information
- Location: 115 Railway Avenue West; Carlyle, Saskatchewan
- Coordinates: 49.63682°N 102.2702°W
- Platforms: 1

History
- Opened: 1909

Former services
Preceding station	Canadian National Railway	Following station
River Bend toward Radville	Radville – Maryfield	Scotford toward Maryfield
Location

The Carlyle station is a former railway station in Carlyle, Saskatchewan. It was built by the Canadian National Railway in 1909 and later served Via Rail. It now houses the Rusty Relics Museum.

== Rusty Relics Museum ==
The Rusty Relics Museum was founded as a non-profit organisation in 1973 thanks to a Youth for Employment Grant from the government. Seven women went around Carlyle gathering artefacts and interviewing older residents to start the founding of the museum. Gladys Nicholl was elected its first president that same year. In 1976, the museum bought the old train station and had it moved to its present location. The museum officially opened on 8 July 1980.

The museum houses a working telegraph station, 10,000 catalogued artefacts, a Canadian Pacific Railway (CPR) caboose and jigger car on a railway track. As a separate building there is a country schoolhouse. There was Anglican Church that was built in 1905 as part of the museum, but it was demolished in 2019.

== Gallery ==
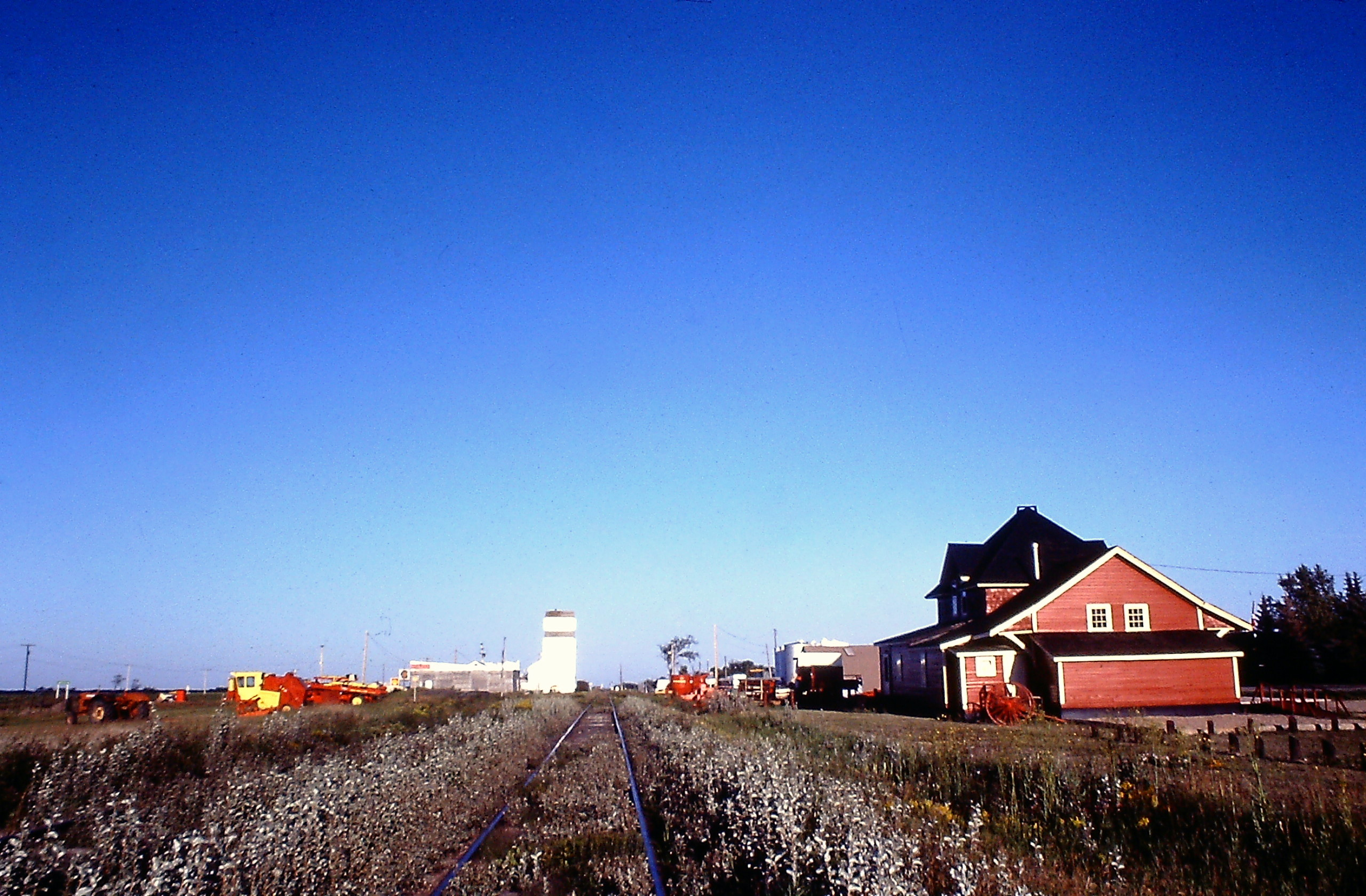
Carlyle Station (July 1980)

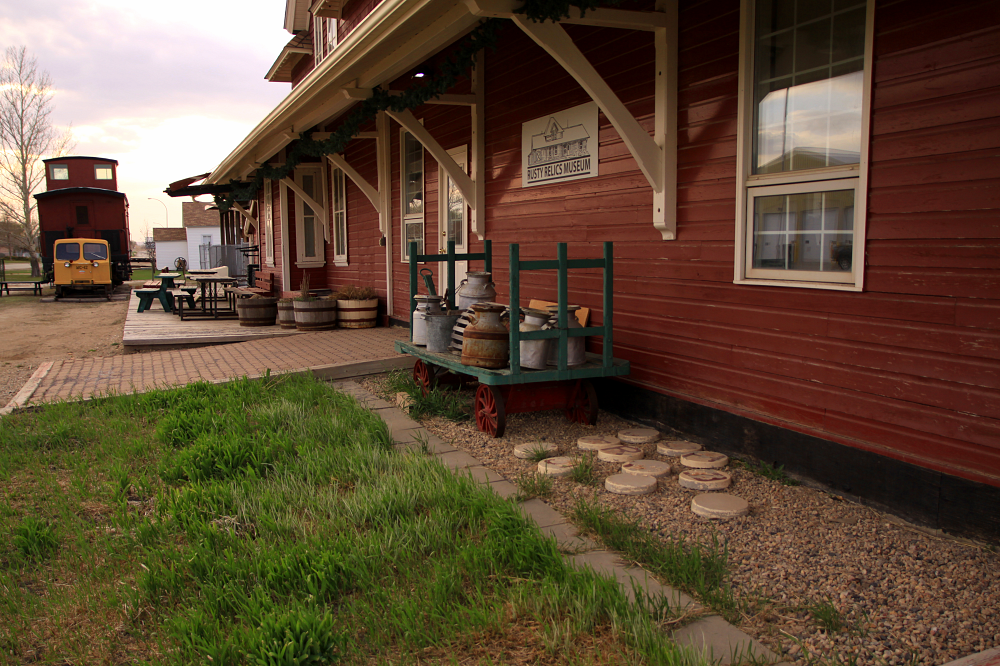
Museum entrance c. 2000s

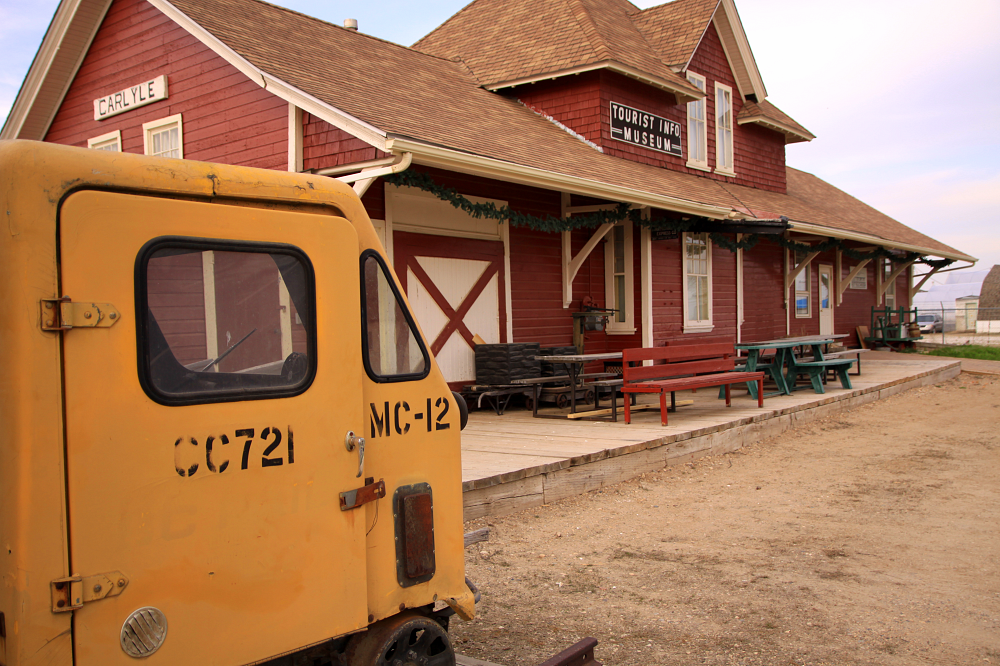
Museum c. 2000s

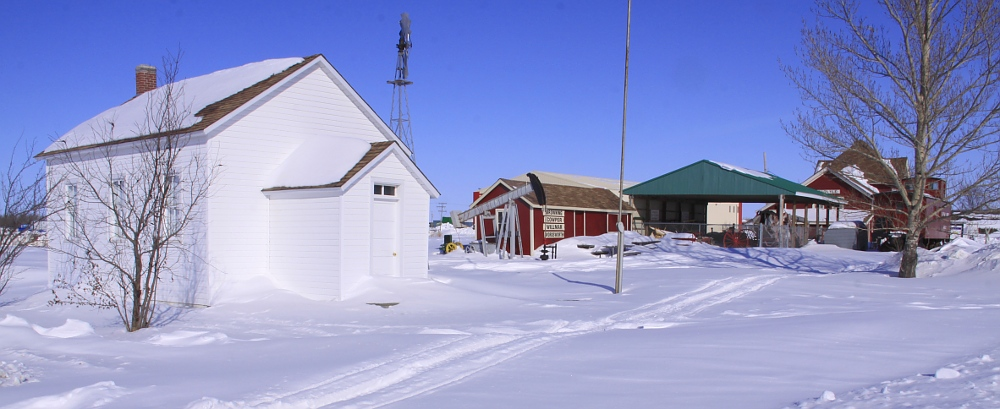
Museum and schoolhouse c. 2000s

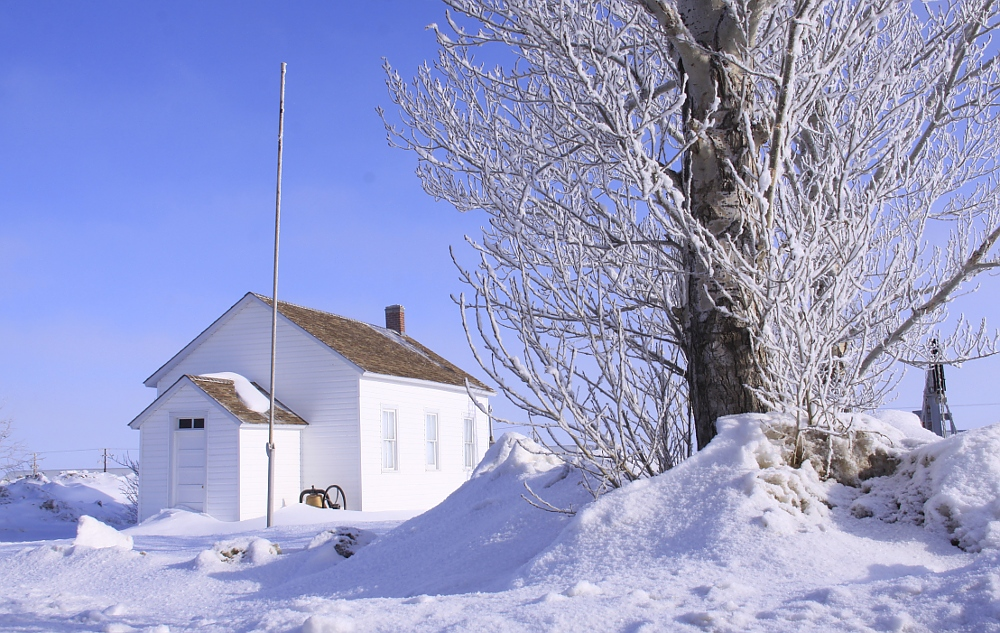
Schoolhouse c. 2000s

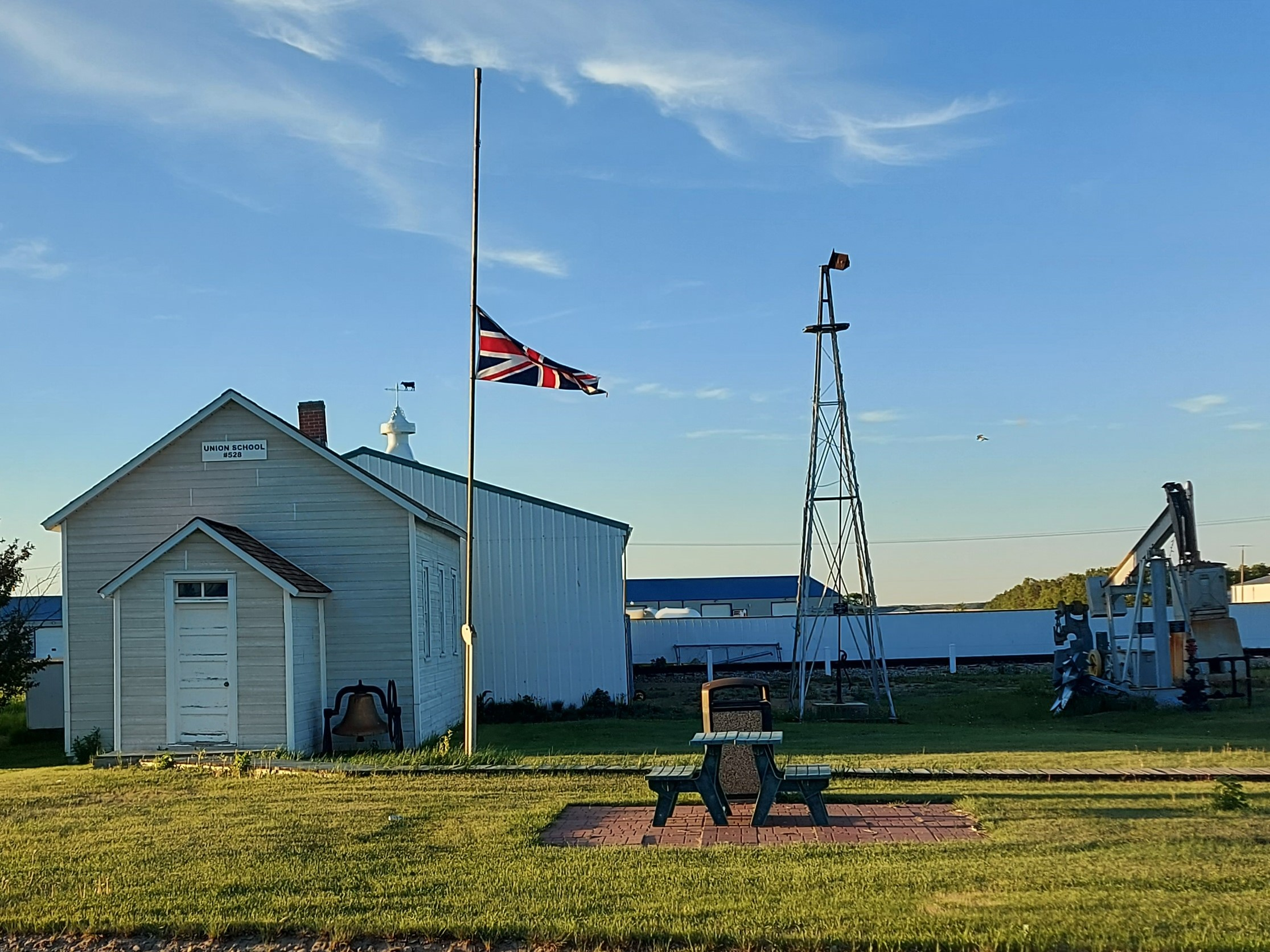
The old country schoolhouse. In this photo, the flag is half-mast because of the unmarked graves found at Indian residential schools

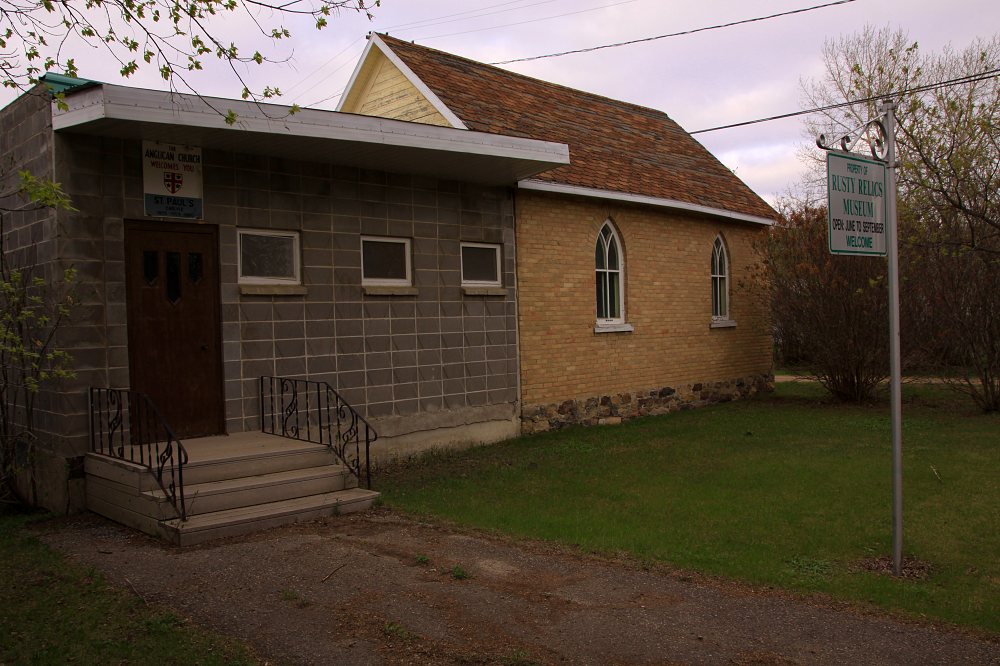
Anglican Church c. 2000s, built 1905, demolished 2019
