= Carlyle, Saskatchewan =

Town in Saskatchewan, Canada

Carlyle
- Town
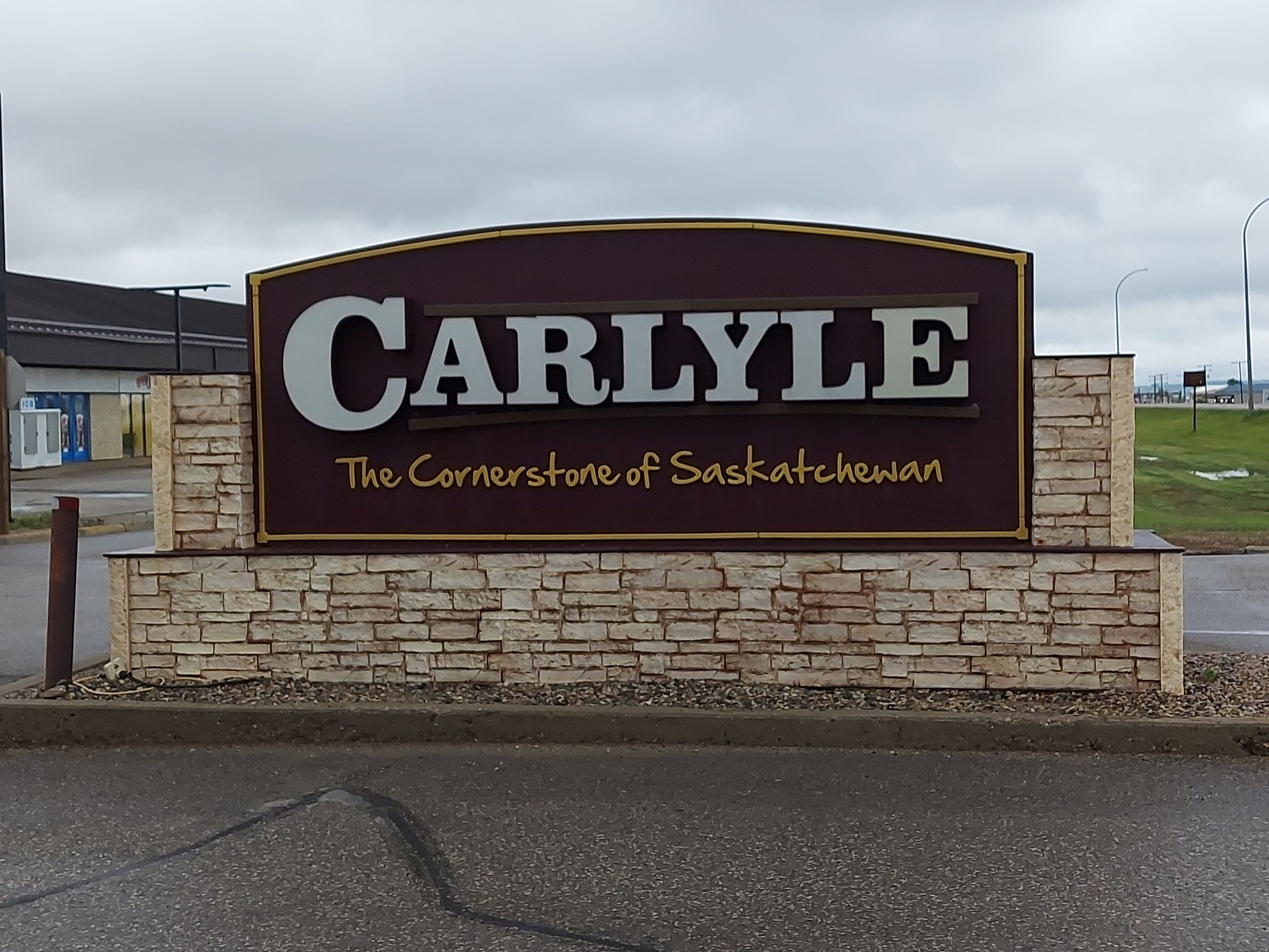
- Carlyle, the Cornerstone of Saskatchewan

- Location within Saskatchewan Location within Canada
- Coordinates: 49.635°N 102.266°W
- Country: Canada
- Province: Saskatchewan
- Region: Southeast
- Census division: Division No. 1
- Rural municipality: Moose Mountain No. 63
- Post office founded: 1883-12-01
- Incorporated (Village): 1902
- Town: 1905

Government
  - Mayor: Jennifer Sedor
  - CAO: Natalie Miller

Area
  - Total: 5.56 km^{2} (2.15 sq mi)

Population (2016)
  - Total: 1,508
  - Density: 271.4/km^{2} (703/sq mi)
- Time zone: CST
- Postal code: S0C 0R0
- Area code: 306
- Highways: Highway 9 (Saskota Flyway) / Highway 13 (Red Coat Trail / Ghost Town Trail)
- Waterways: Morrison Creek
- Website: townofcarlyle.com

Carlyle (2021 population 1,524) is a town in the Canadian province of Saskatchewan. Carlyle is the largest town servicing the far south-eastern corner of Saskatchewan and as a result, has become the economic and services centre of the region. Estevan and Weyburn are the closest cities and both are a little over 100 kilometres away. Regina, the provincial capital, lies about 200 kilometres (120 mi) to the north-west.

Carlyle is located within the RM of Moose Mountain in Census Division No. 1 in Western Canada. Geographically, it is in the Canadian Prairies, which is part of the Great Plains and Prairie Pothole Region of North America. Carlyle was incorporated as a village in 1902, and as a town in 1905. The name Carlyle was chosen by the first postmaster to honour the niece of the Scottish historian and essayist, Thomas Carlyle. His niece and her husband settled in the Arcola district and farmed and raised a family there.

Several other communities in south-east Saskatchewan along the Canadian National Railway were also named after famous British and Canadian poets, garnering the nickname "Poet's Corner". Some of the others include: Wordsworth (William Wordsworth), Browning (Robert Browning), Service (Robert W. Service), Cowper (William Cowper), and Lampman (Archibald Lampman).

== History ==
In 1870 Canada purchased Rupert's Land from the Hudson's Bay Company and created a vast territory called the North-West Territories. The future site of Carlyle was in this territory. In 1874 the North-West Mounted Police (NWMP), as part of their March West, travelled through the area just south of present-day Carlyle en route to what is now southern Alberta to deal with the Cypress Hills Massacre. This route taken is known as the Red Coat Trail, which today's Highway 13 through Carlyle approximates.

The original Carlyle townsite was chosen by a Métis man named John G. Turriff at NW26‑7‑3W2 in 1882, which is about 8 kilometres south of present-day Carlyle, along the east bank of Swift Creek, near where it and Morrison Creek meet Moose Mountain Creek. The first post office opened at that location on 1 December 1883. When it looked like the Canadian Pacific Railway (CPR) was going to build its track north of the townsite, the town moved north to 7‑8‑2W2 in 1900, its current location.

The CPR branch line was constructed in 1900 and in operation by 1901. This original branch line went from Souris, Manitoba, through Carlyle to Arcola, Saskatchewan. The Canadian Northern Railway (CNoR) laid steel into the townsite on 28 October 1909, and on 7 June 1910, the first passenger train went through town. This line was built to bring coal from the coalfields near Bienfait and Estevan to Brandon, Manitoba, and it just happened to go past Carlyle's original location. In 1912, the CNoR built a brick roundhouse capable of servicing up to five engines and a bunkhouse to house the engineers while they waited for the engines to be serviced. The CNoR became one of the founding components of Canadian National Railway (CN) in 1919. With diesel locomotives replacing steam engines, the water tower was demolished in 1969. The former CN Carlyle railway station was sold in 1976 and then moved to its current location and now houses the Rusty Relics Museum and tourist Information Centre.

=== Historical photographs ===
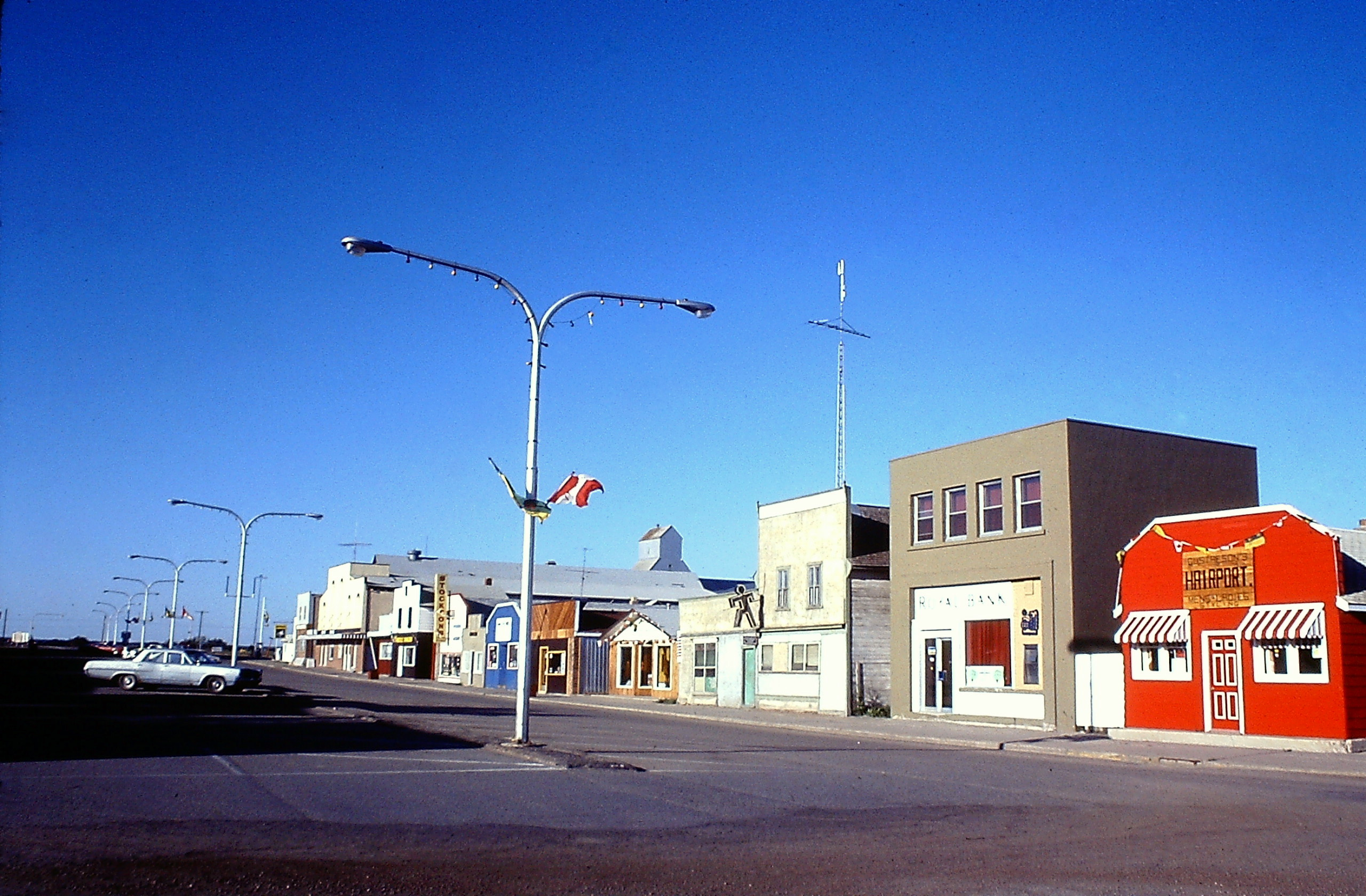
Downtown, July 1980

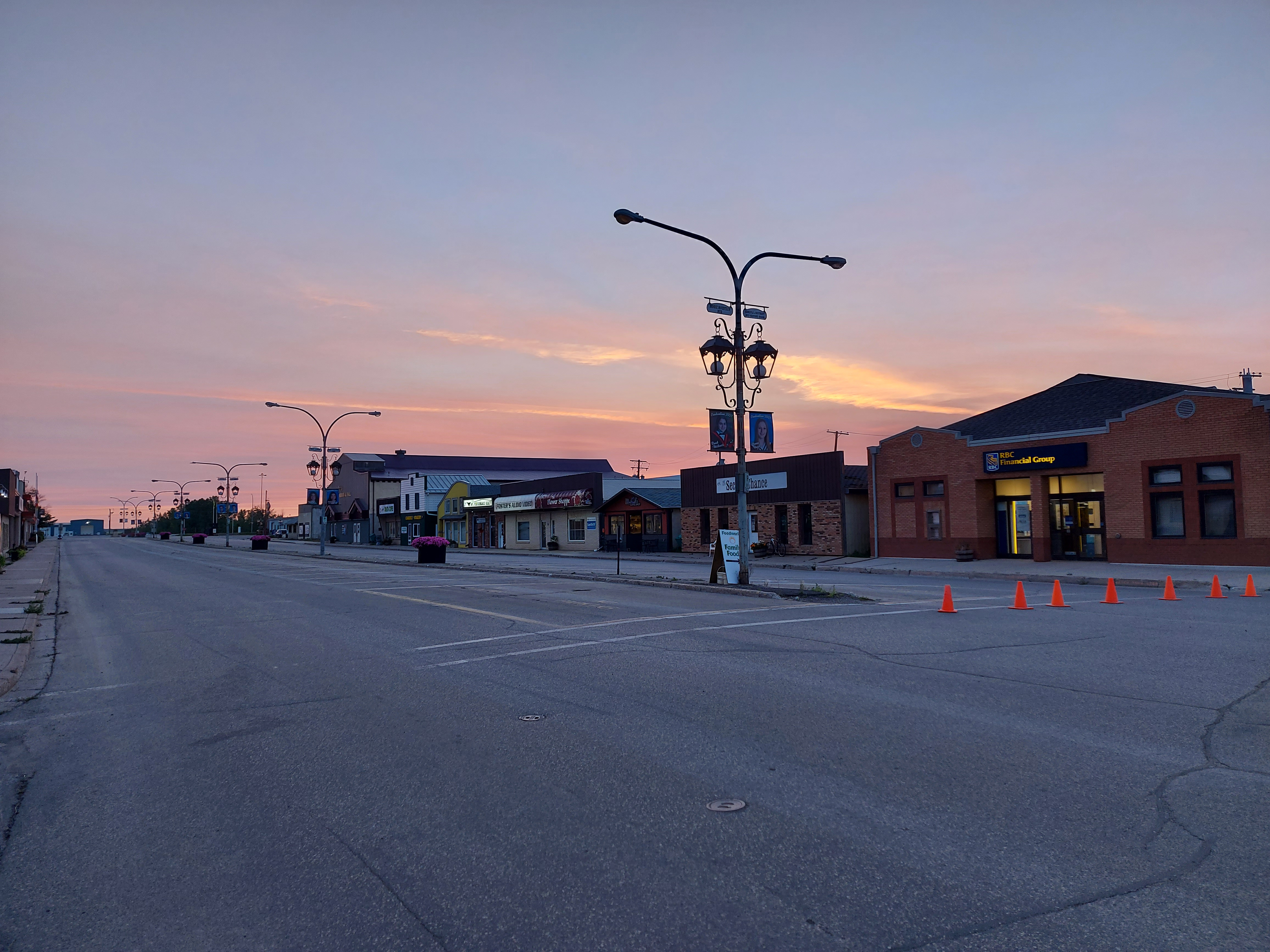
Downtown, July 2021 at dawn. Same view as previous picture, 41 years later.

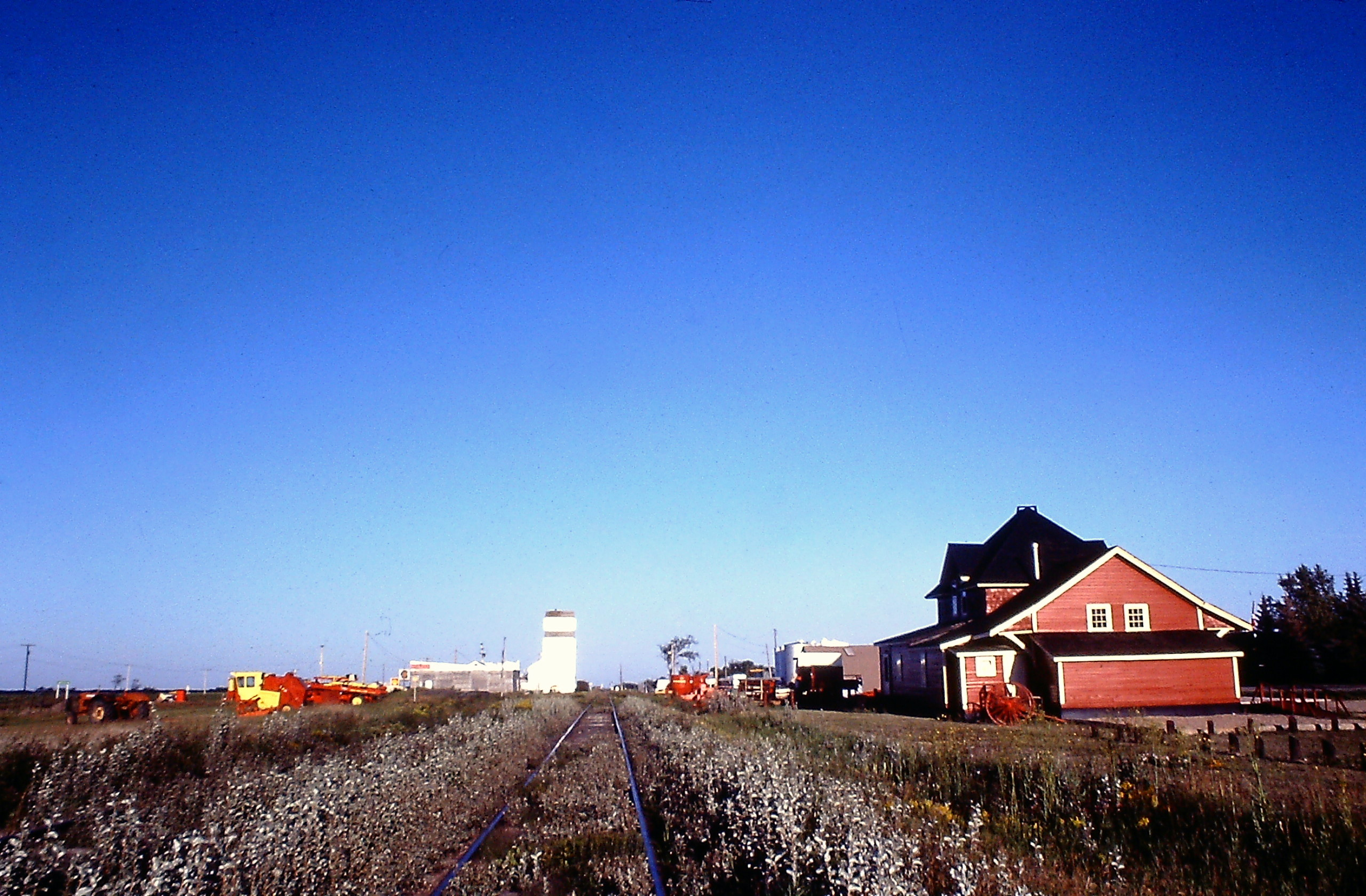
Station and grain elevator, July 1980

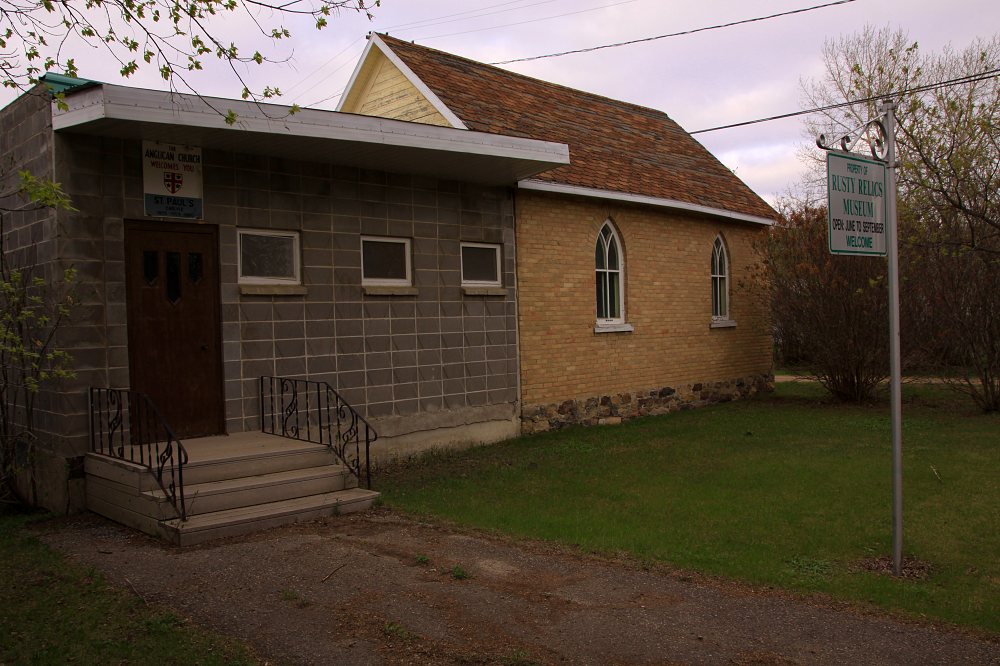
Rusty Relics Museum, Anglican Church. Built 1905, demolished 2019

== Demographics ==
In the 2021 Census of Population conducted by Statistics Canada, Carlyle had a population of 1,524 living in 620 of its 686 total private dwellings, a change of 1.1% from its 2016 population of 1,508. With a land area of 5.41 km^{2} (2.09 sq mi), it had a population density of 281.7/km^{2} (729.6/sq mi) in 2021.

Canada census – Carlyle community profile

	2021	2016	2011
Population	1,524 (+1.1% from 2016)	1,508 (4.3% from 2011)	1,446 (14.6% from 2006)
Land area	5.41 km^{2} (2.09 sq mi)	5.56 km^{2} (2.15 sq mi)	3.19 km^{2} (1.23 sq mi)
Population density	281.9/km^{2} (730/sq mi)	271.4/km^{2} (703/sq mi)	451.1/km^{2} (1,168/sq mi)
Median age	36.4 (M: 36.0, F: 36.8)	35.1 (M: 35.1, F: 35.2)	33.6 (M: 32.3, F: 34.7)
Private dwellings	686 (total) 620 (occupied)	620 (total)	596 (total)
Median household income	$91,000	$118,569

References: 2021 2016 2011

== Climate ==
Climate data for Carlyle
Month	Jan	Feb	Mar	Apr	May	Jun	Jul	Aug	Sep	Oct	Nov	Dec	Year
Record high °C (°F)	8 (46)	13.3 (55.9)	22.2 (72.0)	33.5 (92.3)	37.2 (99.0)	40.6 (105.1)	43.3 (109.9)	39.5 (103.1)	36.7 (98.1)	32.5 (90.5)	21.1 (70.0)	17.2 (63.0)	43.3 (109.9)
Mean daily maximum °C (°F)	−10.9 (12.4)	−7.4 (18.7)	−0.3 (31.5)	10.1 (50.2)	18.5 (65.3)	23 (73)	25.5 (77.9)	24.8 (76.6)	18.1 (64.6)	10.9 (51.6)	−0.7 (30.7)	−8.9 (16.0)	8.6 (47.5)
Daily mean °C (°F)	−16.1 (3.0)	−12.7 (9.1)	−5.4 (22.3)	3.9 (39.0)	11.6 (52.9)	16.4 (61.5)	18.7 (65.7)	17.8 (64.0)	11.5 (52.7)	4.7 (40.5)	−5.3 (22.5)	−13.7 (7.3)	2.6 (36.7)
Mean daily minimum °C (°F)	−21.3 (−6.3)	−17.9 (−0.2)	−10.4 (13.3)	−2.4 (27.7)	4.6 (40.3)	9.7 (49.5)	11.8 (53.2)	10.6 (51.1)	4.9 (40.8)	−1.5 (29.3)	−10 (14)	−18.5 (−1.3)	−3.4 (25.9)
Record low °C (°F)	−45.6 (−50.1)	−47.2 (−53.0)	−40 (−40)	−25 (−13)	−11.7 (10.9)	−4.4 (24.1)	0 (32)	−4.4 (24.1)	−15 (5)	−23.3 (−9.9)	−33.9 (−29.0)	−43 (−45)	−47.2 (−53.0)
Average precipitation mm (inches)	17 (0.7)	14.2 (0.56)	25.5 (1.00)	26.7 (1.05)	47.4 (1.87)	75.6 (2.98)	64.4 (2.54)	58.6 (2.31)	48.1 (1.89)	20.8 (0.82)	16.1 (0.63)	18 (0.7)	432.4 (17.02)
Source: Environment Canada

== Industry and businesses ==
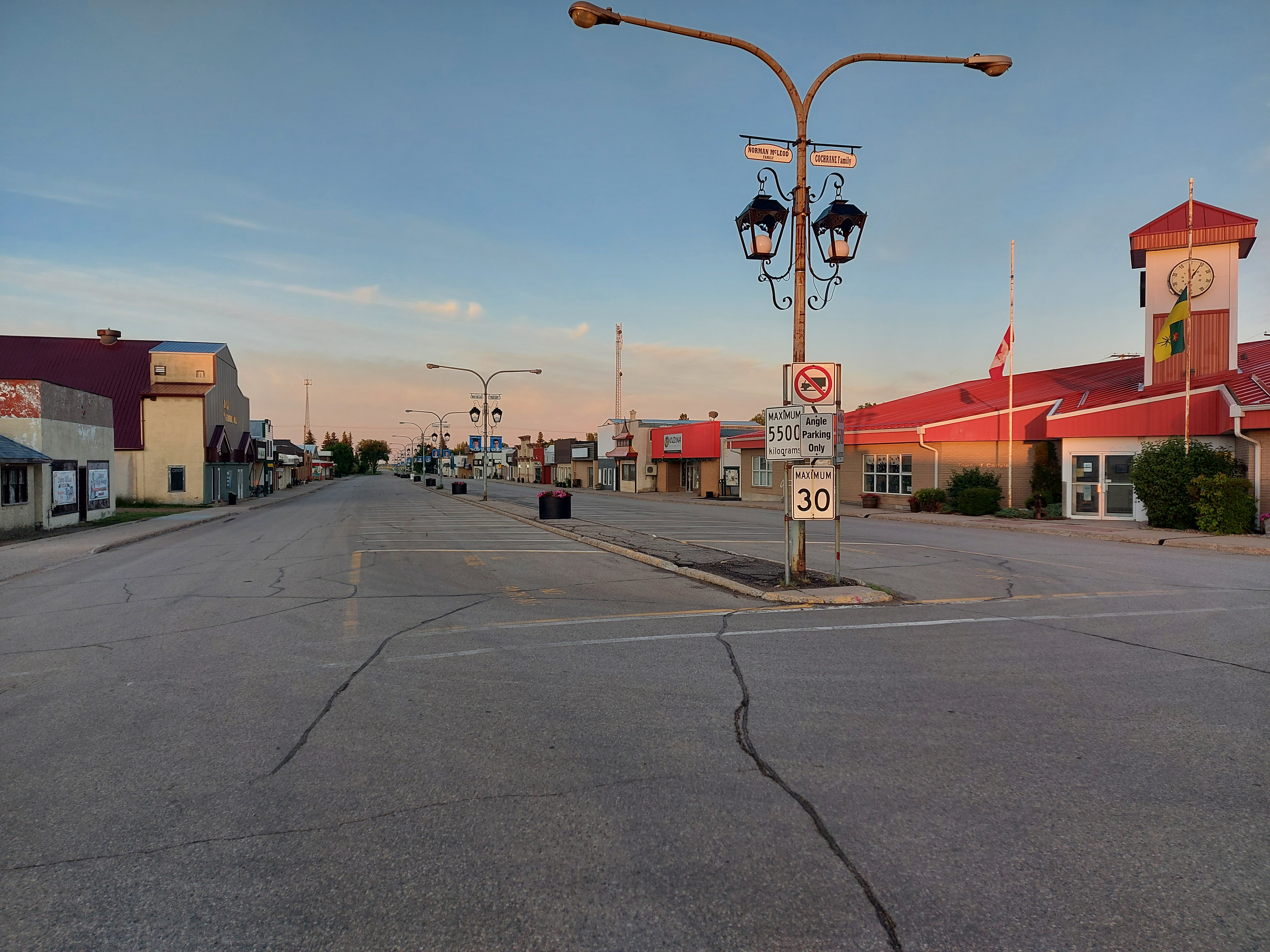
Downtown Carlyle, with Carlyle Civic Centre on the right

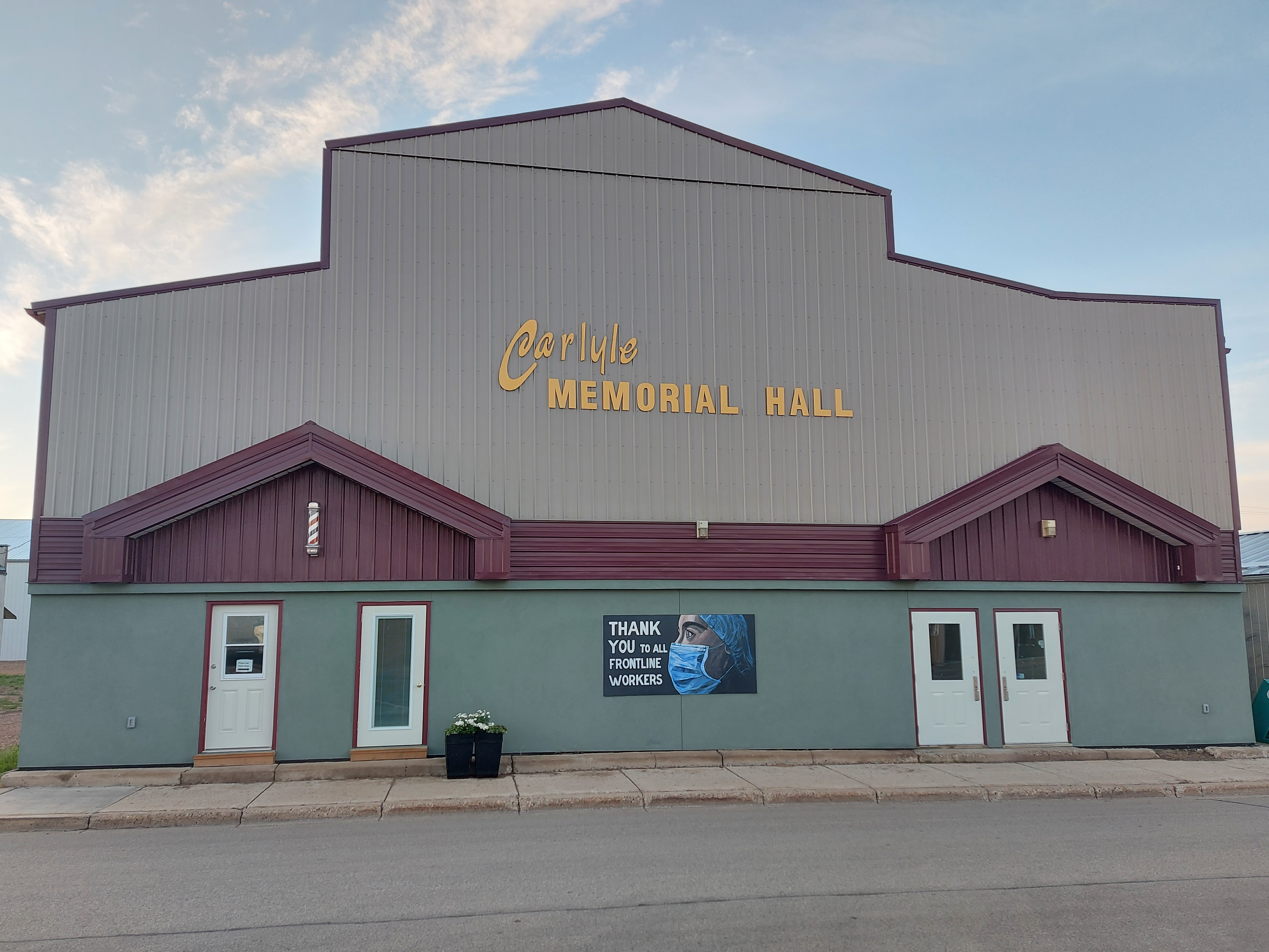
Carlyle Memorial Hall

The three most prominent industries in the Carlyle area are agriculture, the oil and gas sector, and tourism. Tourism sees its biggest impact to local businesses that cater to tourists who come to south-eastern Saskatchewan to visit nearby attractions, such as Moose Mountain Provincial Park.

Being the largest town in the area, Carlyle has a wide variety of businesses that not only cater to local residents and tourists, but to people from neighbouring communities as well. Businesses such as hotels, grocery stores, banks, a Credit Union, gas stations, several restaurants, including fast food chains, a department store, building supply outlets, and several mom-and-pop specialty shops provide an ample variety of services. There are also two car dealerships, an RV dealership, a pleasure craft dealership, and other businesses that deal in ATVs and snowmobiles. Every September Carlyle hosts the annual Home Spun Craft Show that features over 70 venders from all over Canada. The show is held in the Carlyle Sports Arena and over 4,000 people attend.

Agriculture is what initially brought settlers to Carlyle in the late 1800s and it continues to play an important role in the local economy. While Carlyle's grain elevator is long gone, a vibrant trucking industry, farm equipment sales and repair, and other agriculture related businesses continue to thrive.

Compared to the other two main industries, oil and gas is the newest. Oil was first discovered in south-eastern Saskatchewan in 1953 near Midale. The oil industry was slow to develop but with advances in Bakken oil extraction techniques in the 1990s, the industry started to take off. And by the 2000s, the industry was booming. Pump jacks, oil batteries, and pipeline terminals are found all around the Carlyle area. Oil companies have set up offices in Carlyle and companies that service the oil industry, such as drilling rigs, service rigs, transport, oil waste disposal and cleanup, and petro-chemicals, have come to dominate the local economy.

== Transportation ==
Carlyle sits at the cross-roads of Highways 9 and 13. Of the two original railway lines that went through Carlyle, only one, the CNR line, remains and it carries freight, such as oil and grain. The last passenger train to depart from Carlyle was on 25 August 1959. The other line, CPR, issued notices of discontinuance for the section going from Carlyle to Arcola on 24 March 2000 and from Redvers to Carlyle on 20 July 2004.

There is no public transportation to or from town, with the exception of a shuttle that goes to the Bear Claw Casino. Locally, the town operates a Handi-Transit van for the elderly and disabled.

The Carlyle Airport is owned and operated by the town. The Carlyle Flying Club sells 100LL and Jet A.

== Services ==
On main street in the Carlyle Civic Centre, there's the Carlyle Provincial Court-Circuit Point that takes care of many court related needs, such as traffic tickets. The Carlyle Detachment of the RCMP is located on Railway Avenue W and, like the Provincial Court, is responsible for a large catchment around Carlyle. Carlyle does not have a hospital, but does have a Primary Health Clinic and ambulance service; the nearest hospital is about 17 kilometres away in Arcola. The volunteer fire department, located on the west side of town, is responsible for fire management in town and the surrounding RM of Moose Mountain. Construction of the current fire hall was completed in 2020 and the official opening ceremony was on 7 December 2020.

Other services include a post office, the Carlyle Observer, which is a weekly print and online newspaper, the Carlyle Public Library, which is a branch of the Southeast Regional Library. and five churches.

== Parks and recreation ==
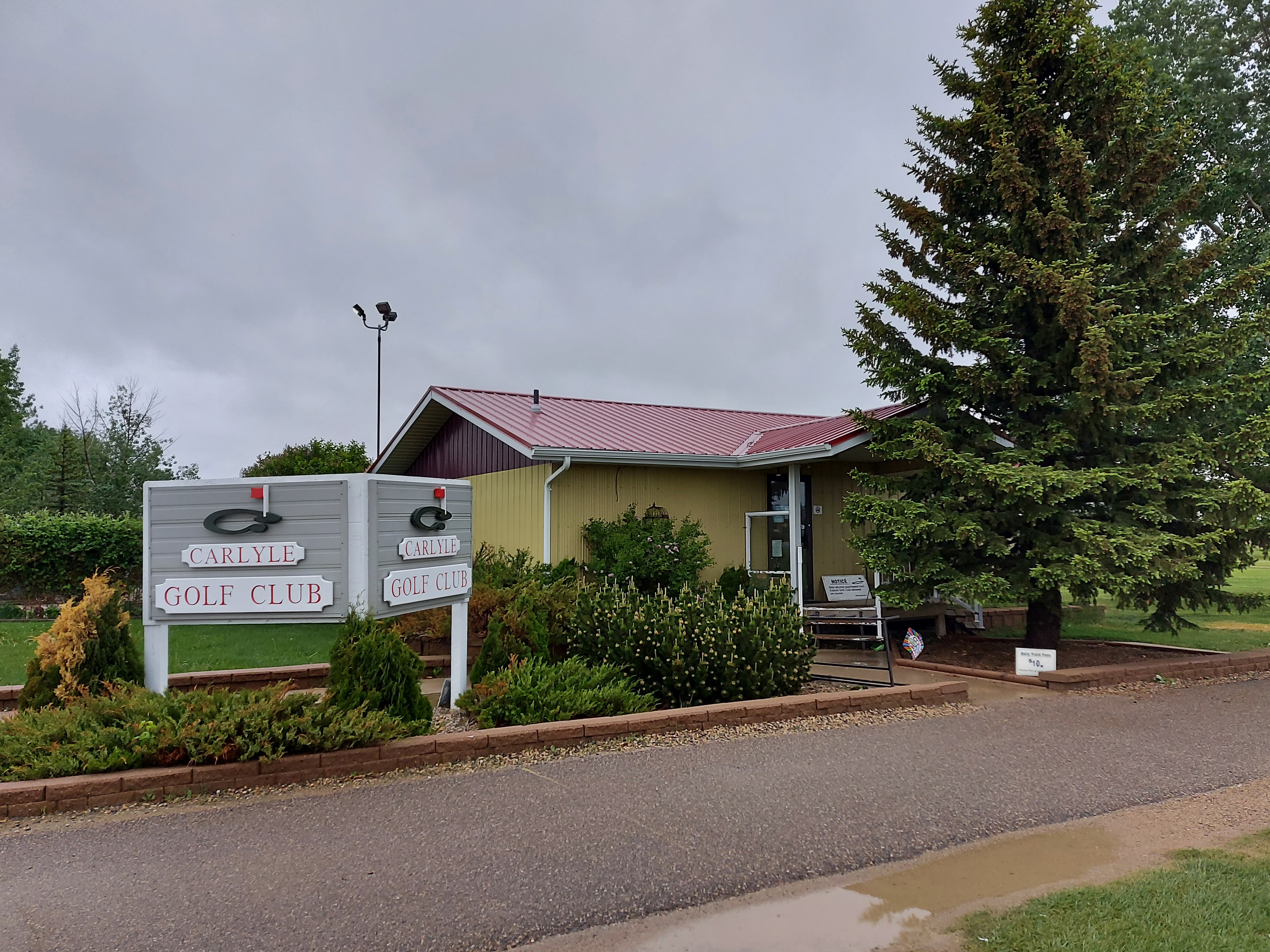
Carlyle Golf Clubhouse

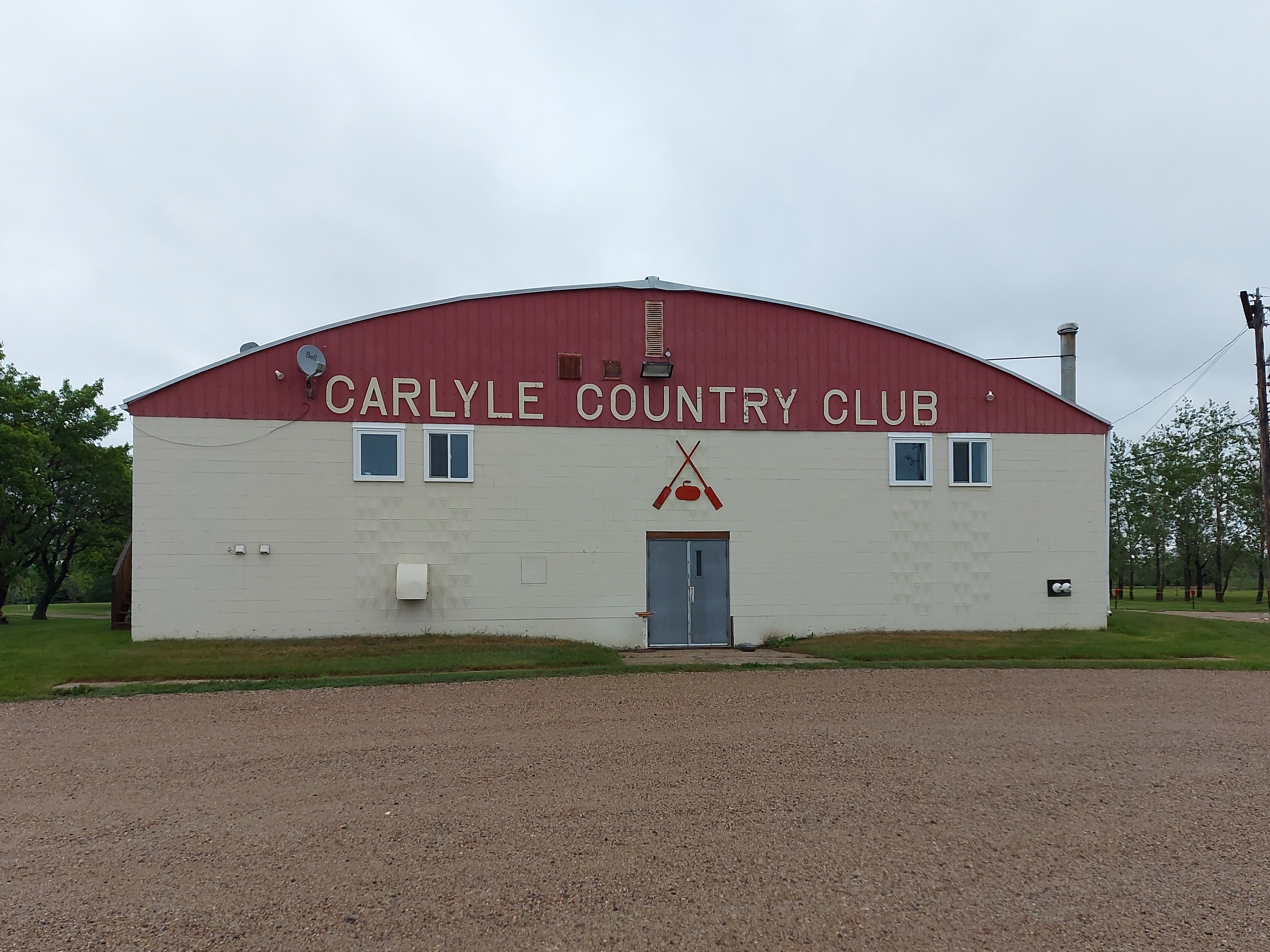
Carlyle curling rink

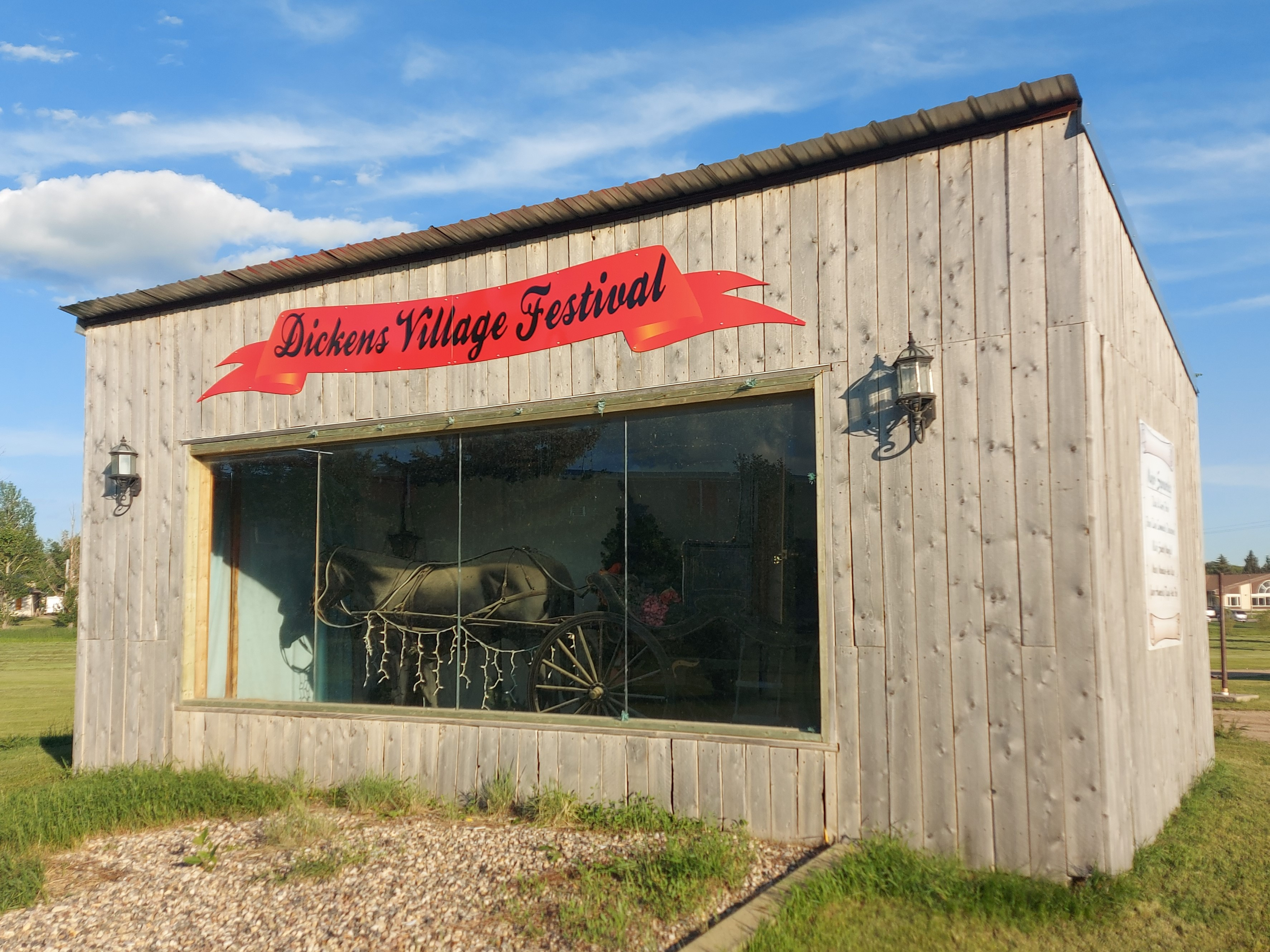
The year-round Dickens Festival display in West Park

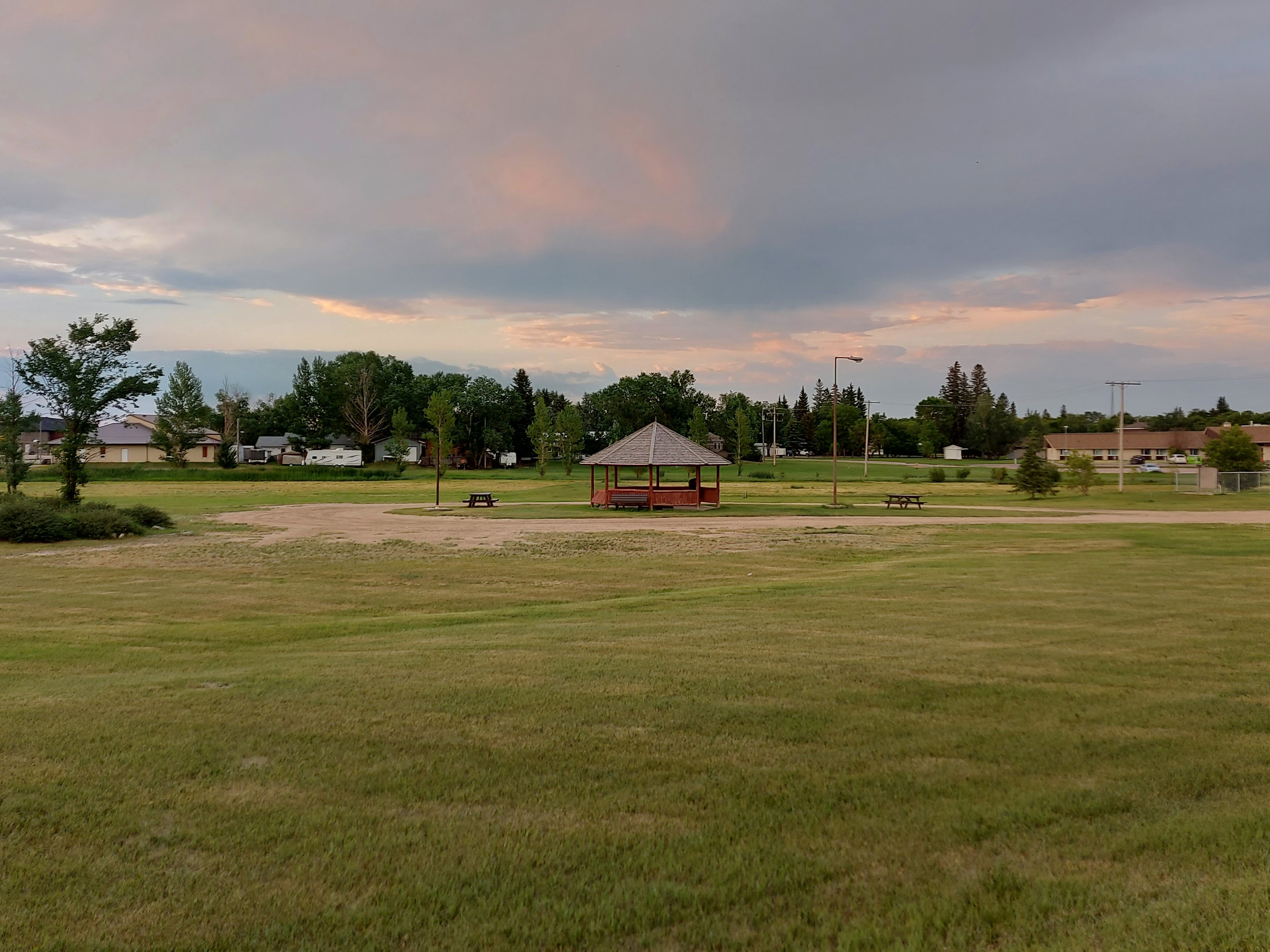
The Gazebo in West Park

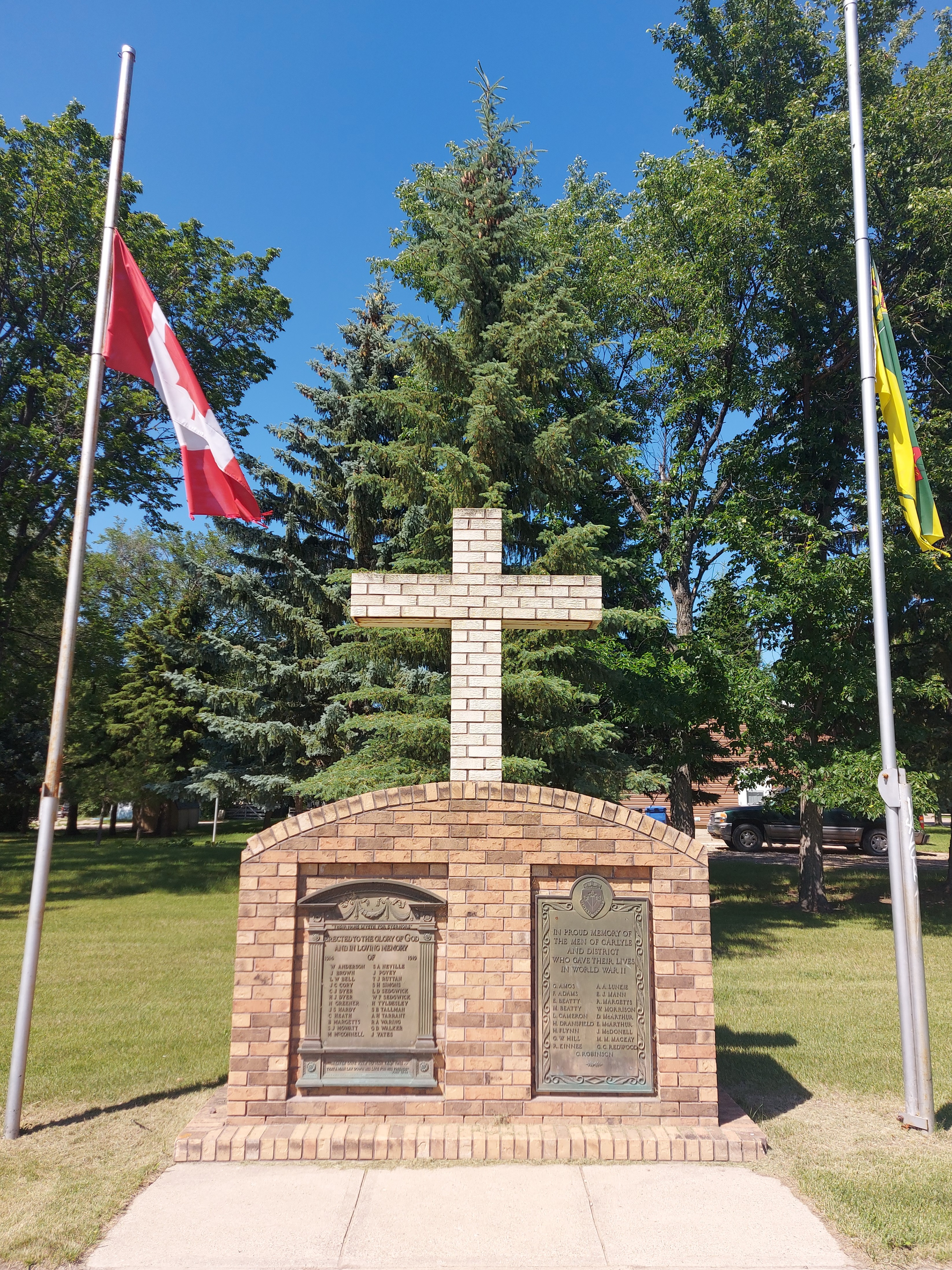
Carlyle Cenotaph. The flags are half-mast because of the unmarked graves found at Indian Residential Schools

Twenty-four kilometres north of Carlyle on Highway 9, in the heart of the Moose Mountain Uplands, is Moose Mountain Provincial Park, the most significant tourist attraction in the region. The park features Kenosee Lake, Kenosee Superslides, golfing, mini-golf, the Moose Mountain Chalet, camping, hiking, fishing, and many more activities. About 30 kilometres to the north-east is Cannington Manor Provincial Park, which is a IUCN protected area category III and on the Canadian Register of Historic Places.

The Bear Claw Casino & Hotel is also located north of Carlyle on Highway 9. It is on the White Bear First Nation.

In town, there is a 9-hole golf course, Carlyle Sports Arena (CSA), an outdoor swimming pool, curling with four sheets of ice, a motocross track, and a playground. Lions Park in Carlyle has a soccer pitch, six ball diamonds, the aforementioned swimming pool, camping, and walking paths. Centennial Park was established in 2005 to recognise Carlyle's 100-year anniversary. There's a gazebo, time capsule, and a children's splash park, which was added in the spring of 2021. West Park, on the west side of town along Morrison Creek, has a picnic area, gazebo, and, added in 2020, an off-leash dog park. Carlyle was featured on Global Regina's 'Focus Saskatchewan' on 12 January 2014.

The Prairie Dog Drive-in Theatre, one of five left in Saskatchewan, is located about 3 kilometres (1.9 mi) north of town along Highway 9. The drive-in theatre originally opened at that site in 1981 and has gone through several name changes since. The only other big screen in town is a one-screen theatre on the second floor of the Carlyle Memorial Hall in downtown. Unlike the Prairie Dog Theatre, it does not have regular showings and is only open for special events.

=== Dickens Village Festival ===
On the first weekend of December each year since 2002, the town holds a Dickens Village Festival, which features a Christmas parade, horse carriage rides, and many of the businesses and people put on a Charles Dickens-19th century theme. It is the only annual Dickens Village Festival in Canada. The Cornerstone Theatre group runs at least two shows a year. The one on the first weekend in December is in co-ordination with the Dickens Village Festival. The theatre shows are sold out every year.

=== Carlyle Fun Dayz ===
Carlyle Fun Dayz is an annual summer event put on by the town. The event features a Lion’s Pancake Breakfast, live shows with music and street dancing, beer gardens, food venders, a kids zone that includes a petting zoo, a parade, and a farmer's market.

=== Organised sports ===
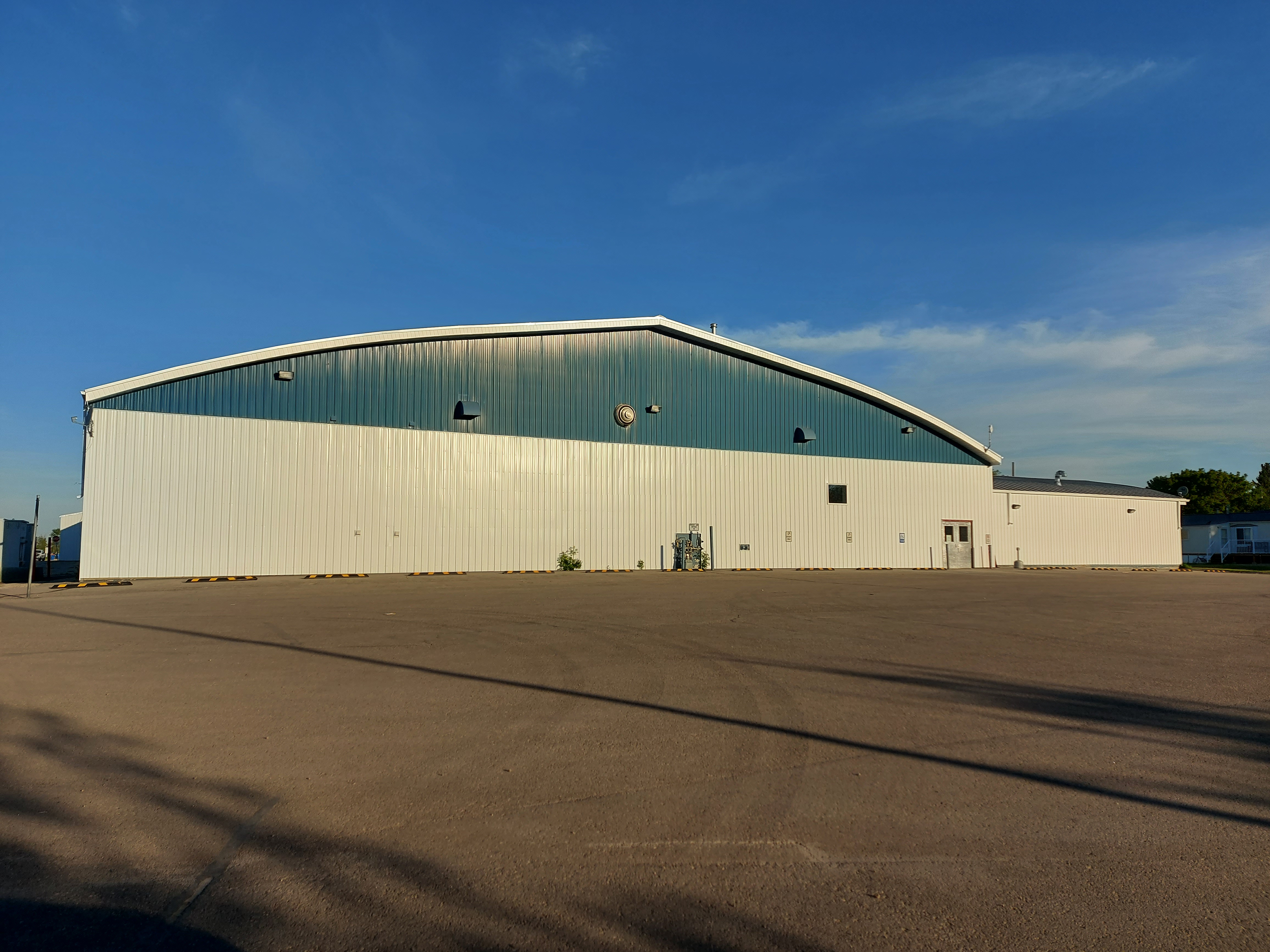
Carlyle Sports Arena (CSA), the local ice rink

Carlyle has a variety of organised sports that make use of its facilities.

The Carlyle Cardinals of the men's senior Saskota Baseball League call the baseball diamonds at Lions Park home. There is also a Carlyle Minor Ball for youth programme there. Another youth programme, Moose Mountain Soccer, plays at the soccer pitch at Lions Park.

In the Carlyle Sports Arena, the Cougars of the Big 6 Hockey League play senior men's ice hockey. The Cougars have won the championship Lincoln Trophy nine times since the league's inception in 1960; the last time was in 2001. For youth, there is a CanSkate programme through Carlyle Skating Club, minor hockey, and female midget hockey. There is also a figure skating club.

== Education ==
Carlyle has two public schools, an elementary school and a high school, and they are in the South East Cornerstone Public School Division. Carlyle Elementary School (CES) has children from pre-kindergarten to grade 6. The school's mission statement is "To enable every student to be the best that they can be." The high school, Gordon F. Kells, has grades from 7 to 12. Its moto is "Respect, Responsibility, and Integrity."

== Notable people ==
- Brenden Morrow — ice hockey player
- Haydn Fleury — ice hockey player
- Cale Fleury — ice hockey player

== See also ==
- List of towns in Saskatchewan
- List of communities in Saskatchewan
- Carlyle Lake Resort
