= Cannington Manor Provincial Park =

Provincial park in Saskatchewan, Canada

- IUCN category III (natural monument or feature)
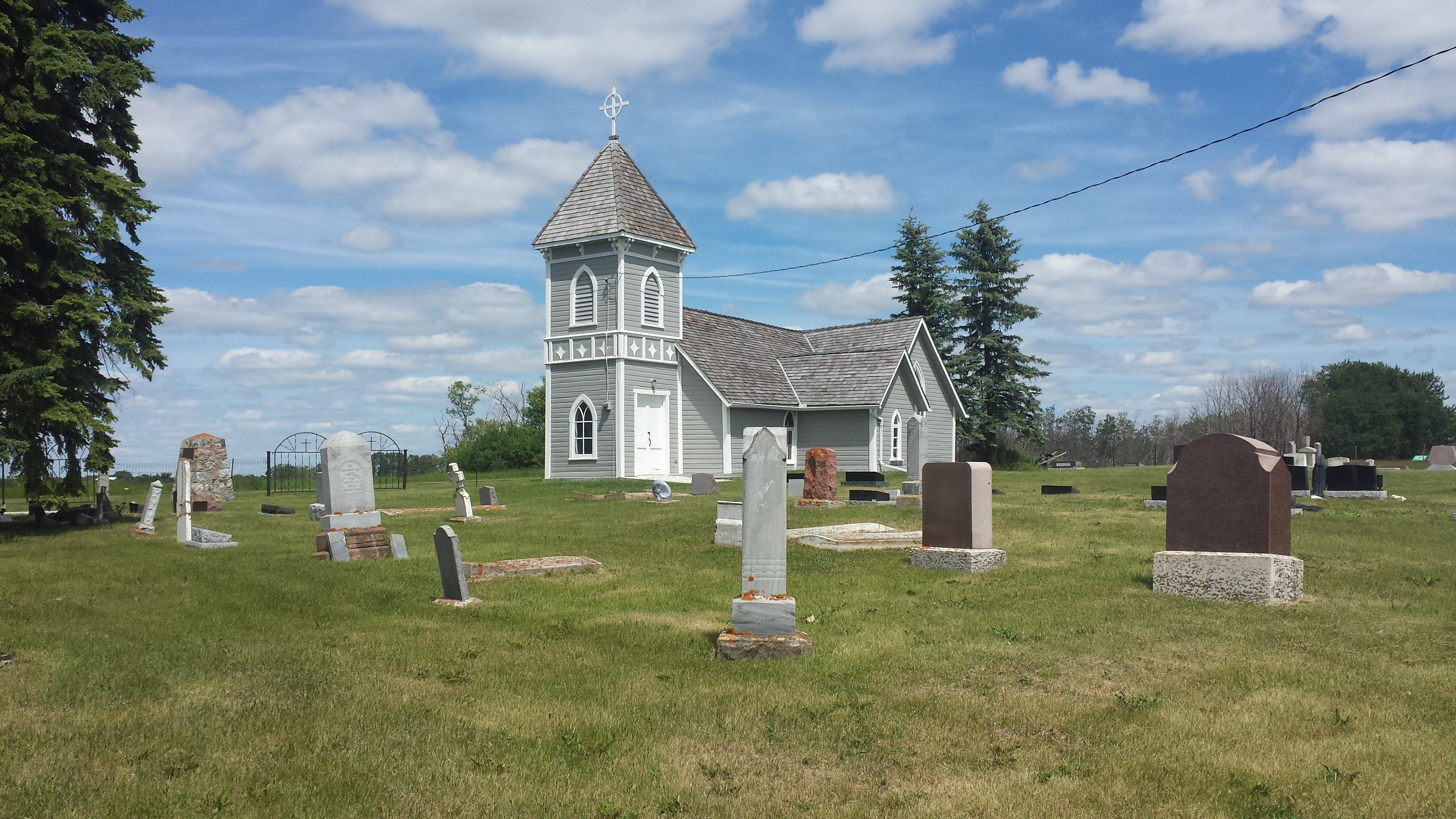
- All Saints Anglican Church

- Location within Saskatchewan Location within Canada
- Interactive map of Cannington Manor Provincial Park
- Location: Saskatchewan, Canada
- Nearest city: Carlyle
- Coordinates: 49.7333°N 102.0458°W
- Established: 1986
- Governing body: Sask Parks

Cannington Manor Provincial Park is an historic provincial park in the RM of Moose Mountain in the south-east corner of the Canadian province of Saskatchewan. An aristocratic English colony was established at the site in 1882 by Captain Edward Michell Pierce. It became a provincial park in 1986. Cannington Manor is located northwest of Highway 603. The Colony is 16 kilometres (9.9 mi) south-east of Moose Mountain Provincial Park, and 60 kilometres (37 mi) south of Moosomin.

Captain Pierce established an agricultural college and attracted remittance men as students for £100 a year. The intention of the college was to instruct these bachelor sons of wealthy families to farm and homestead in the last best west. The brothers Ernest, Billy, and Bertie Beckton constructed "Didsbury", ranch house within Cannington Manor colony.

The cultural and recreational life emulated English upper class society. Thoroughbred racing, polo matches, theatrical plays, fox hunting, billiards, soccer, and tennis were all enjoyed by the colony students and settlers. This was a contrast to the neighbouring homesteaders who were barely eking out a living proving their land and making improvements to earn land title grants from the Dominion Government.

Soon a dairy, a school / town hall, blacksmith, Moose Mountain trading company store, Harold Fripp flour mill, C.E. Phipps Land Titles Office, carpenter shop, and Mitre hotel were built to support a community of 200 residents.

== Demise of colony ==
Captain Pierce, the founder of the community died on 20 June 1888. C.E. Phipps established the land titles office here in 1889 and moved to Oxbow in 1891. Spencer Page was the colony's first teacher in 1889 before turning to politics in 1894. Louis Kent the second teacher in Cannington Manor started his duties in 1894 and passed on in 1896. Robert Bird the Moose Mountain trading company store keeper moved to British Columbia in 1898. Ernest Maltby postmaster and his wife Mary arrived in 1892 and then also moved in 1901 to British Columbia.

Between 1901 and 1902, the Canadian Pacific Railway (CPR) regional branch line was constructed about 10 kilometres (6.2 mi) south of the village rather than through the village. During a time of travel by horseback this distance was detrimental to the growth of the community. The passing of the founder, a few years earlier, a drought and low grain prices soon made it unfeasible for settlers to continue the lifestyle at Cannington Manor.

== Historic sites ==
The park is composed of two separate parcels of land. Firstly, a 15-hectare parcel contains archaeological remains of the village and several replica buildings. A 1920s one-storey, wood-frame schoolhouse serves as the park's visitor reception centre near the entrance. All Saints Anglican Church, built in 1884 and still in use, is near the centre of the village site, but it is not on park property. The church is on the Canadian Register of Historic Places.

A second, 32-hectare parcel, which is located 3 kilometres (1.9 mi) west of the village site, consists of a farmyard and 2 ½-storey wood-frame house and remnant walls of two stone outbuildings. The house, built in 1888, is known as the Humphrys / Hewlett House and it too is on the Canadian Register of Historic Places. The buildings were formally recognised on 26 May 1986 and were put on the Register on 1 November 2006.

== Gallery ==
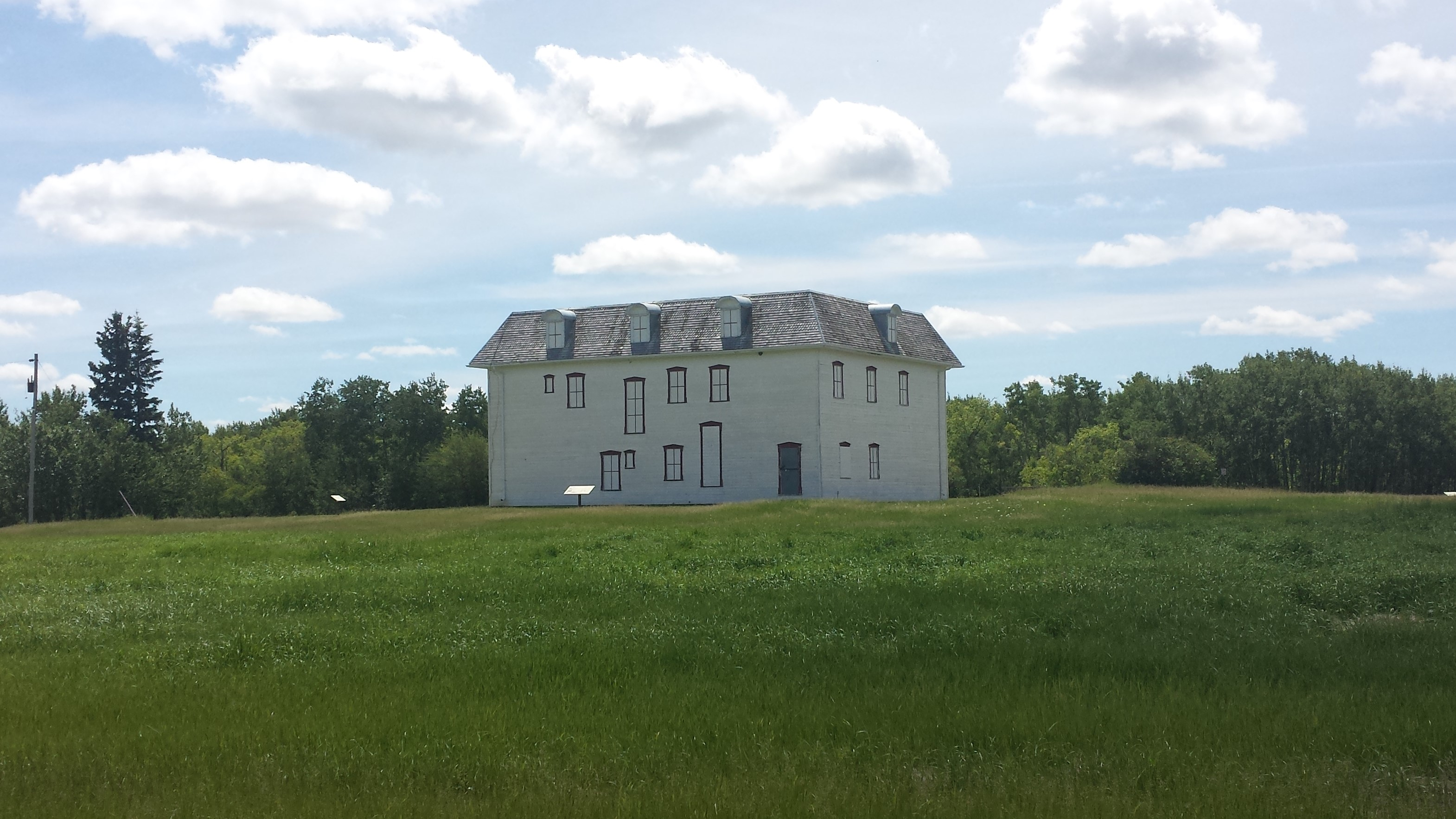
The Humphrys/Hewlett House built in 1888 (2015)

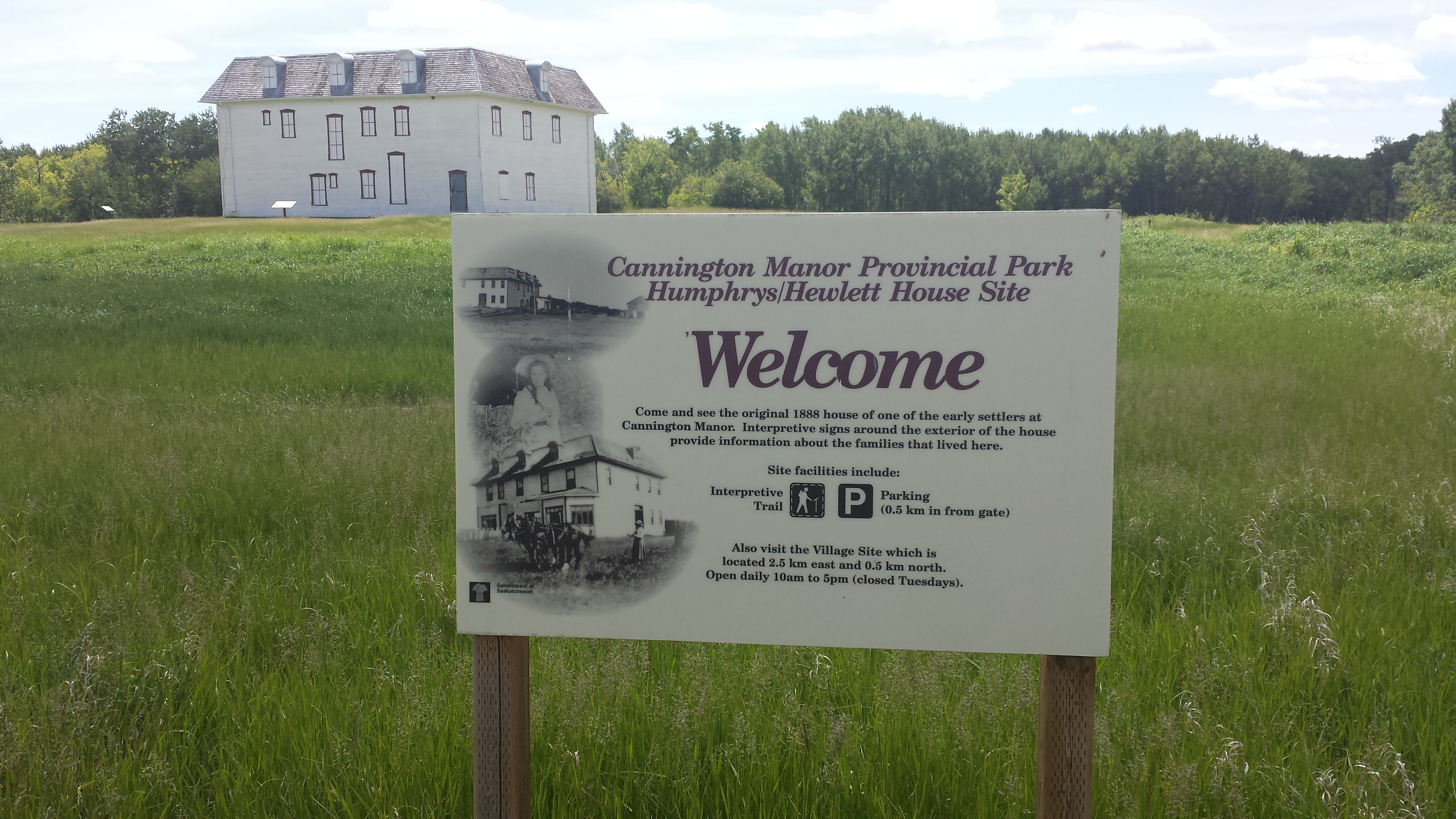
The Humphrys/Hewlett House and plaque (2015)

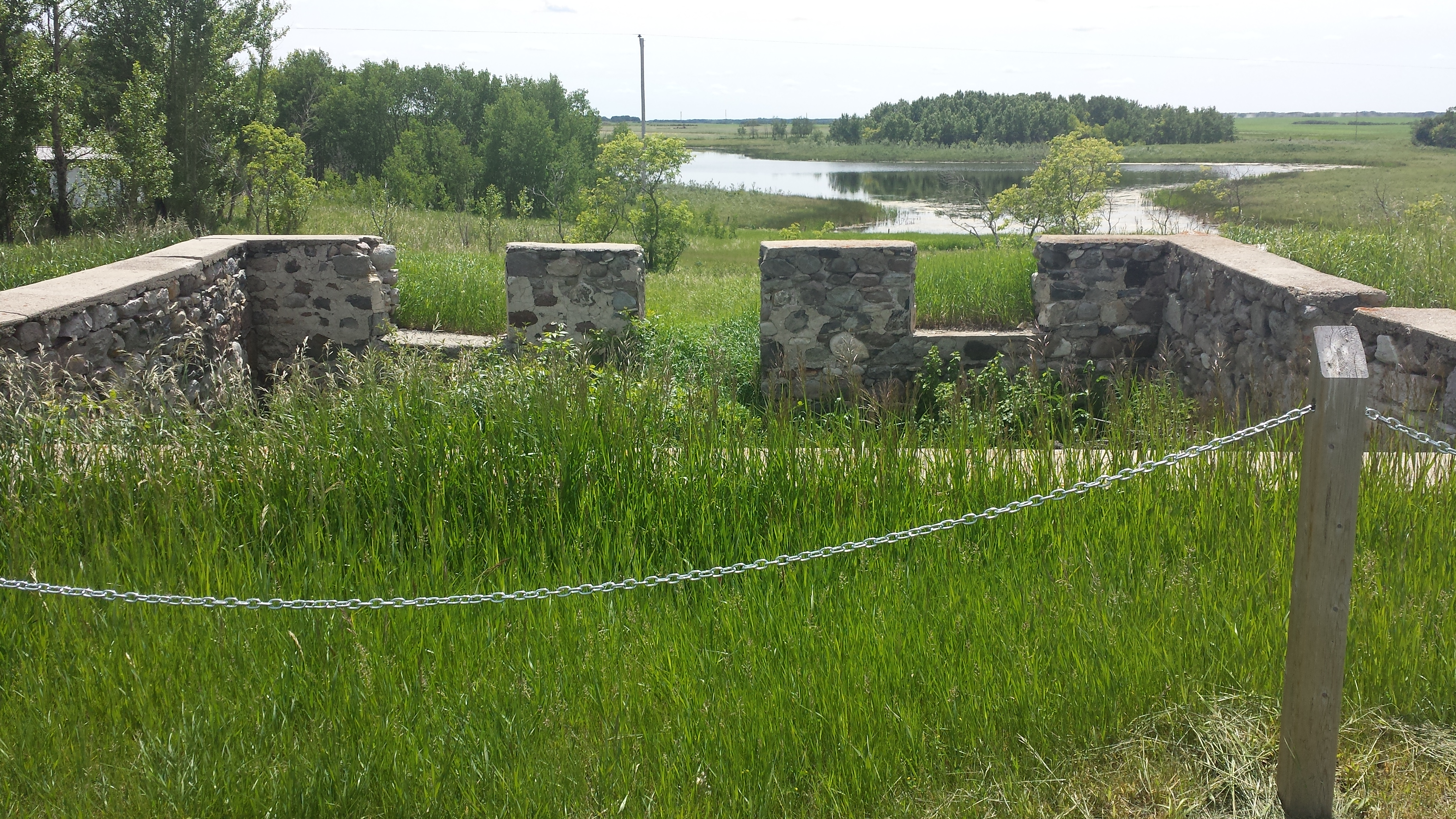
Archaeological site at Cannington Manor (2015)

== See also ==
- List of protected areas of Saskatchewan
- List of historic places in rural municipalities of Saskatchewan
- St. Hubert Mission
- Tourism in Saskatchewan
