= Rural Municipality of Moose Mountain No. 63 =

Rural municipality in Saskatchewan, Canada

Moose Mountain No. 63
- Rural municipality
- Rural Municipality of Moose Mountain No. 63
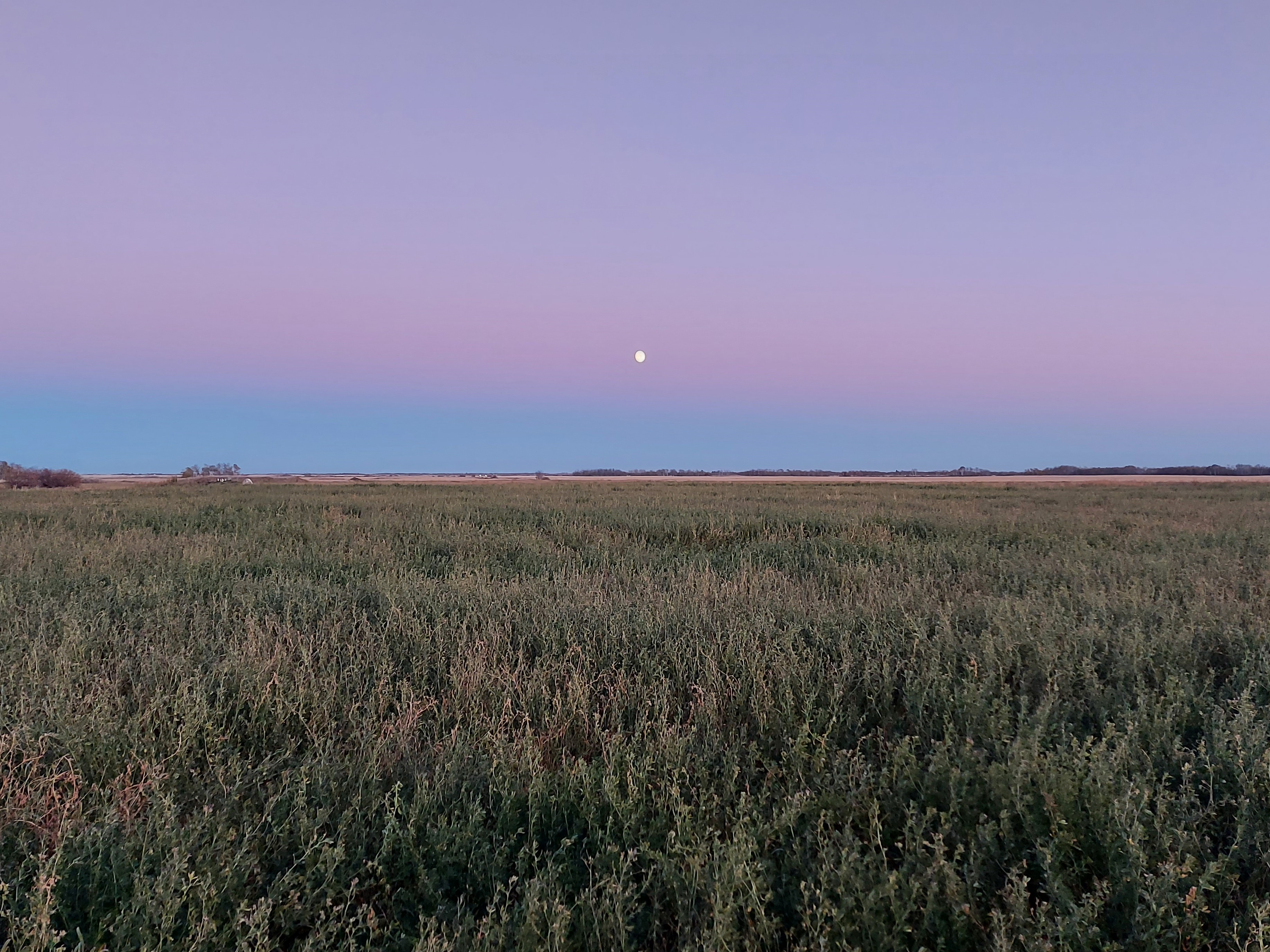
- Moonrise over a field near Carlyle

- Location of the RM of Moose Mountain No. 63 in Saskatchewan
- Coordinates: 49.611°N 102.143°W
- Country: Canada
- Province: Saskatchewan
- Census division: 1
- SARM division: 1
- Federal riding: Souris—Moose Mountain
- Provincial riding: Cannington
- Formed: December 11, 1911

Government
  - Reeve: Kelly Brimner
  - Governing body: RM of Moose Mountain No. 63 Council
  - Administrator: Christie Hislop
  - Office location: Carlyle

Area (2016)
  - Land: 738.38 km^{2} (285.09 sq mi)

Population (2016)
  - Total: 492
  - Density: 0.7/km^{2} (1.8/sq mi)
- Time zone: CST
  - Summer (DST): CST
- Postal code: S0C 0R0
- Area codes: 306 and 639
- Website: Official website

The Rural Municipality of Moose Mountain No. 63 (2016 population: 492) is a rural municipality (RM) in the Canadian province of Saskatchewan within Census Division No. 1 and SARM Division No. 1. It is located in the south-east portion of the province.

== History ==
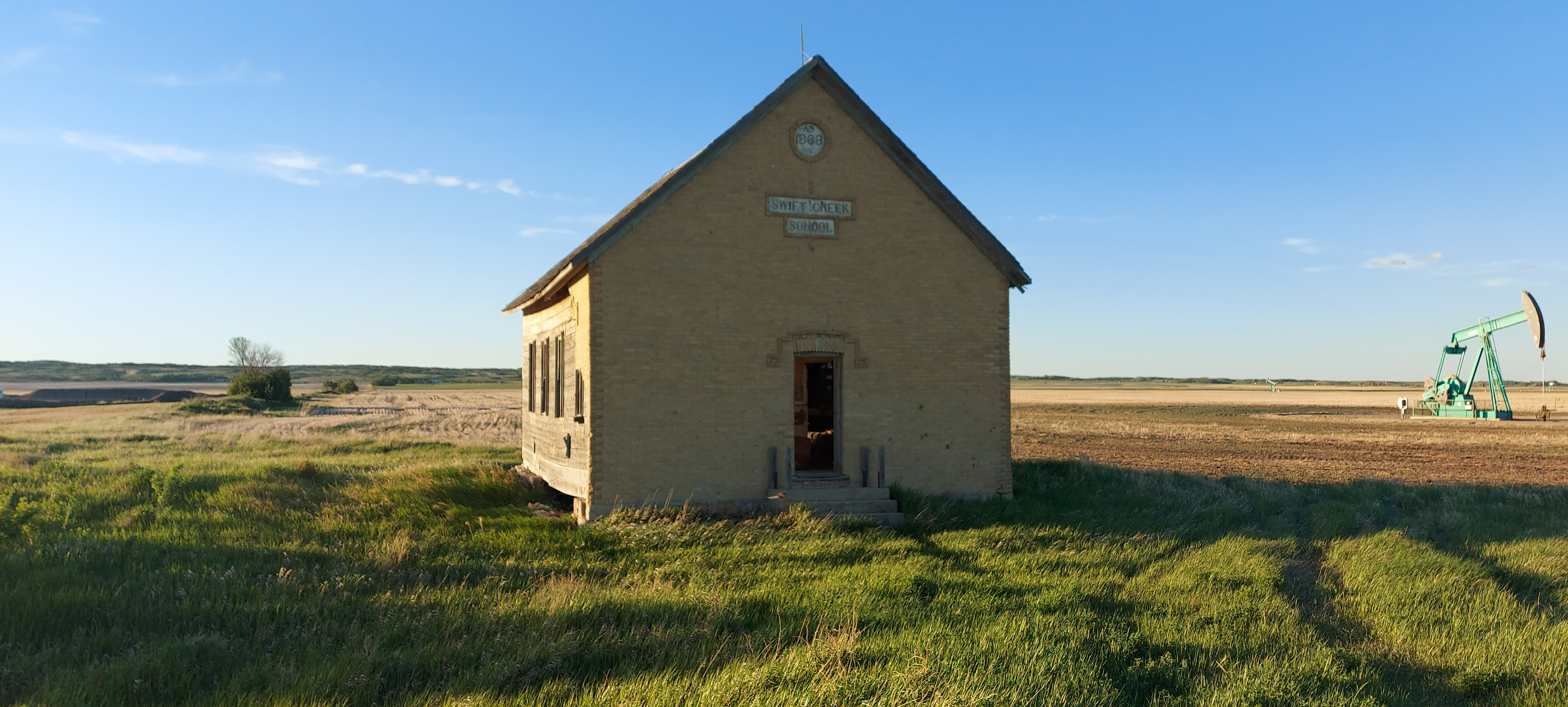
Swift Creek School #261 built in 1908, near Carlyle. A Pumpjack is to the right of the building and Moose Mountain Upland is visible in the background.

The RM of Moose Mountain No. 63 incorporated as a rural municipality on December 11, 1911. It derived its name from the large number of moose that inhabit the Moose Mountain Uplands in the north-west corner of the RM.

The Church of All Saints, built in 1885, and the Humphrys/Hewlett House, built in 1888, are historical properties located in Cannington Manor Provincial Park. The park is in the north-east corner of the RM and is a IUCN protected area category III and on the Canadian Register of Historic Places.

== Communities and localities ==
The following urban municipalities are surrounded by the RM.

Towns

- Carlyle

Villages

- Manor

The following unincorporated communities are within the RM.

Organized hamlets

- Cannington Lake

Localities

- Carlyle Lake Resort (White Bear)
- Cowper, an unincorporated Canadian National Railway (CNR) point located at 49° 40'N, 102° 7'W; NE 19-8-1 W2, just east of Cowper Creek

- Elevation: 653 metres
- A post office opened there on 1 August 1911 and closed four years later on 31 December 1915
- Cowper was named after the British poet, William Cowper

- Fremantle, an unincorporated Canadian Pacific Railway (CPR) platform located at 49° 8'N, 102° 23'W; SE 17-8-3 W2

- Elevation 627 metres
- Consisted of a siding, railway platform, and 2 grain elevators that no longer exist

- Glen Adelaide, unincorporated locality at 49° 47' 0"N, 102° 2' 2"W; NW 10-10-1 W2

- The Glen Adelaide Cemetery was established in 1897

- Service, an unincorporated CN Railway point located at 49° 40'N, 102° 2'W; SE 28-8-1 W2

- Elevation 652 metres
- Named after Robert W. Service

- Steppes, an unincorporated CP Railway point located at 49° 37'N, 102° 11'W; NE 3-8-2 W2

- Elevation 628 metres
- Consisted of a siding, railway platform, and a grain elevator that no longer exist

- Wordsworth

Cowper, Service, and Wordsworth are all named after famous British and Canadian poets. They are all found along the CN Railway and are part of "Poet's Corner", along with several other communities along that railway line in south-east Saskatchewan.

== Demographics ==
Population history (1981–2016)
Year	Pop.	±%
1981	757	—
1986	710	−6.2%
1991	581	−18.2%
1996	565	−2.8%
2001	515	−8.8%
2006	482	−6.4%
2011	480	−0.4%
2016	492	+2.5%
Source: Statistics Canada via Saskatchewan Bureau of Statistics

In the 2021 Census of Population conducted by Statistics Canada, the RM of Moose Mountain No. 63 had a population of 489 living in 198 of its 224 total private dwellings, a change of −0.6% from its 2016 population of 492. With a land area of 718.23 km^{2} (277.31 sq mi), it had a population density of 0.7/km^{2} (1.8/sq mi) in 2021.

In the 2016 Census of Population, the RM of Moose Mountain No. 63 recorded a population of 492 living in 189 of its 218 total private dwellings, a 3.6% change from its 2011 population of 475. With a land area of 738.38 km^{2} (285.09 sq mi), it had a population density of 0.7/km^{2} (1.7/sq mi) in 2016.

== Government ==
The RM of Moose Mountain No. 63 is governed by an elected municipal council and an appointed administrator that meets on the second Wednesday of every month. The reeve of the RM is Kelly Brimner while its Administrator is Christie Hislop. The RM's office is located in Carlyle.

== Parks and recreation ==
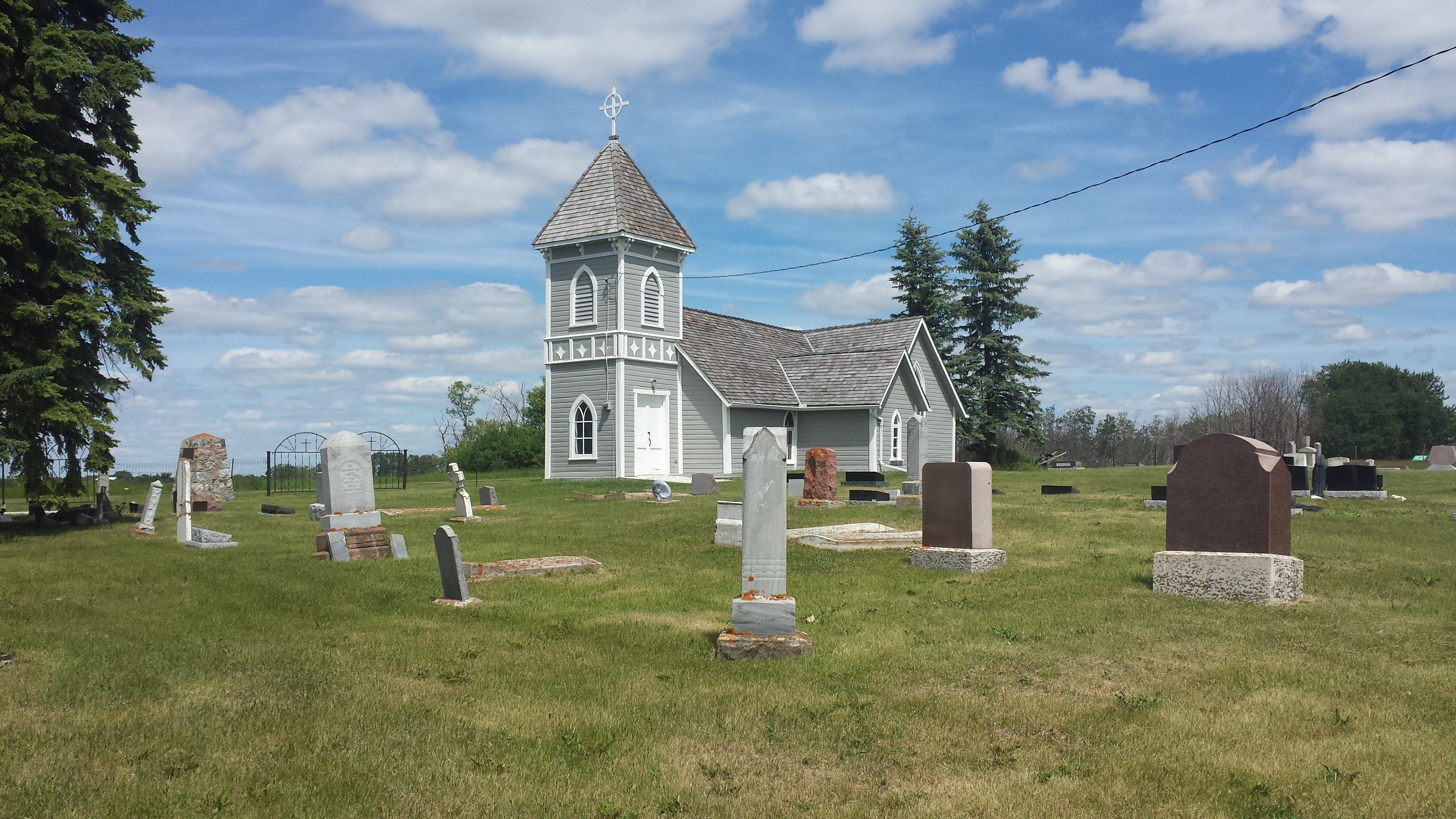
All Saints Anglican Church, built in 1885 and still in use. (2015)

There are two provincial parks within the RM of Moose Mountain. Near the north-east corner is Cannington Manor Provincial Park and along the north part of the RM in the Moose Mountain Upland is Moose Mountain Provincial Park.

Near the north-west corner of the RM on the eastern shore of Kippan Lake, along the border of Moose Mountain Provincial Park, is Saskairie (49°42'24.0"N 102°23'06.1"W). Saskairie is a Nature Conservancy of Canada property that was established in 1974 by Prairie Lore and Living Society on three-quarters of a section of woodland wilderness. Prairie Lore and Living Society was formed in 1972 as a non-profit organisation. The three founding members were Jack MacKenzie, Don Stewart, and Nora Stewart.

"A place like Saskairie with its wilderness aspects of beauty, solitude and peace can only become more and more valuable in our fast-paced technological society", Jack MacKenzie

The park was originally created to provide a year-round outdoor and environmental educational facility for students. In 1977, a cabin was built that could accommodate 32 people.

== See also ==
- List of protected areas of Saskatchewan
- Tourism in Saskatchewan
