= CIDD-FM =

- Carlyle Lake Resort; Canada
- Broadcast area: White Bear 70
- Frequency: 97.7 MHz
- Branding: 97.7 The Moose

Programming
- Format: First Nations community radio

Ownership
- Owner: White Bear First Nation; (White Bear Children's Charity Inc.)

History
- First air date: December 4, 2002

Technical information
- ERP: 47 watts
- HAAT: 43.4 metres (142 ft)
- Transmitter coordinates: 49°45′22″N 102°16′39″W

Links
- Webcast: CIDD-FM
- Website: themoosefm.com

CIDD-FM ("97.7 The Moose") is a community radio station that operates at 97.7 FM in Carlyle Lake Resort, Saskatchewan, Canada.

Owned by the White Bear Children's Charity Inc., the station was licensed in 2001.
