= Carlyle Lake Resort =

Community in Saskatchewan, Canada

- Hamlet
- Location within Saskatchewan Location within Canada
- Coordinates: 49.75°N 102.2672°W
- Country: Canada
- Province: Saskatchewan
- Region: Southeast
- Census division: Division No. 1
- Indian reserve: White Bear 70
- Hamlet: December 31, 1972
- Elevation: 763 m (2,503 ft)

Population
  - Total: 691
- Time zone: CST
- Postal code: S0C 2S0
- Area code: 306
- Highways: Highway 9
- Waterways: White Bear (Carlyle) Lake

Carlyle Lake Resort, also known as White Bear Lake Resort, is a hamlet in White Bear Band Indian reserve, Saskatchewan, Canada. The community is situated on the southern shore of White Bear (Carlyle) Lake on a forested plateau called Moose Mountain Upland. On December 31, 1972, Carlyle Lake Resort was dissolved as a village; it was restructured as a hamlet under the jurisdiction of the Indian reserve of White Bear Band on that date. The hamlet is located about 14 kilometres (8.7 mi) north of the town of Carlyle on Highway 9.

Carlyle Lake Resort is also home to the 18-hole White Bear Golf Course. Bear Claw Casino & Hotel is a short distance north on Highway 9.

== See also ==
- List of communities in Saskatchewan
- List of hamlets in Saskatchewan
