= Cannington Lake (Saskatchewan) =

Lake in Saskatchewan, Canada

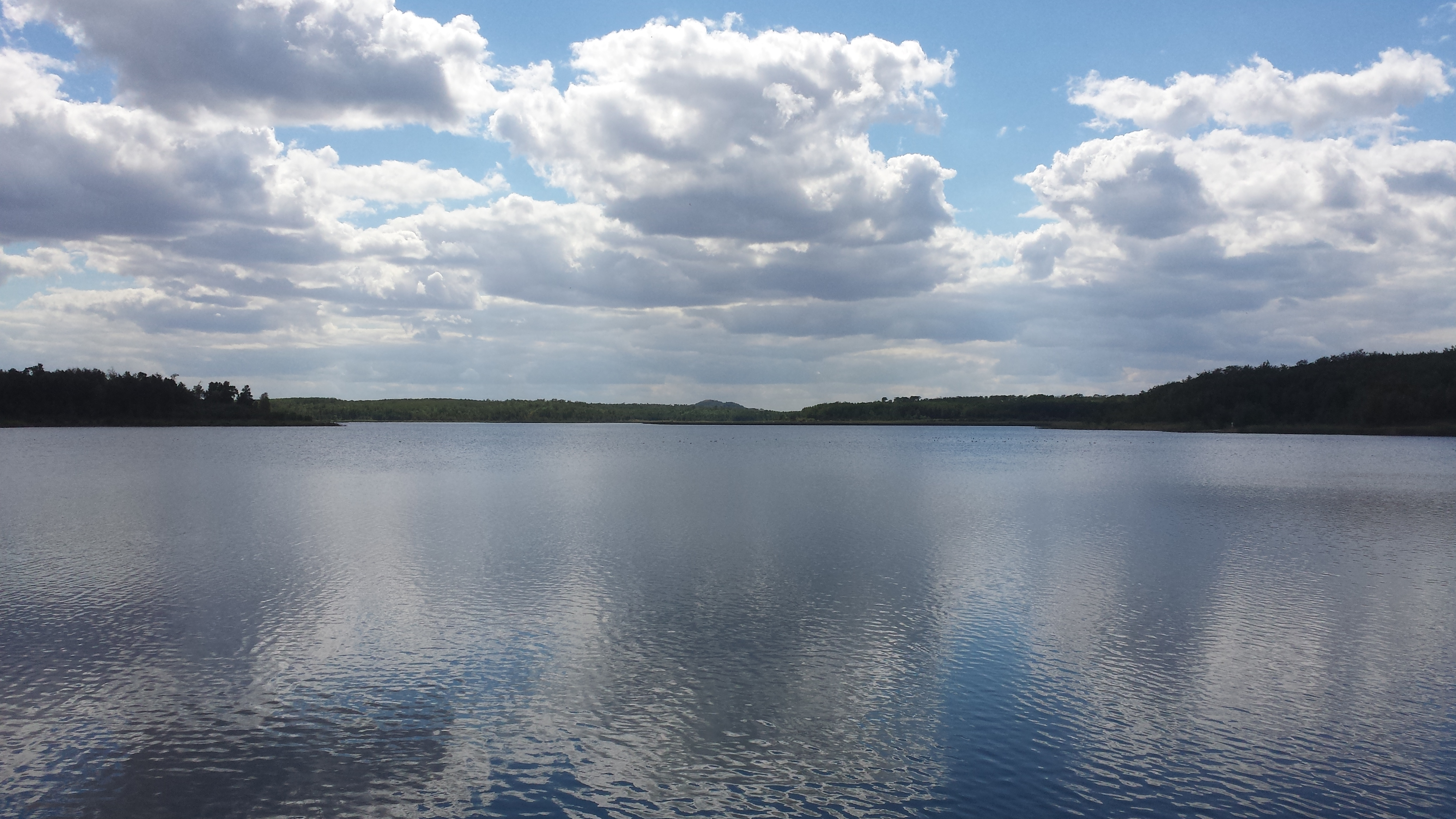
- Cannington Lake

- Location in Saskatchewan Cannington Lake (Canada)
- Location: RM of Moose Mountain No. 63, Saskatchewan
- Coordinates: 49.7723°N 102.1673°W
- Type: Kettle lake
- Part of: Red River drainage basin
- River sources: Moose Mountain Upland
- Basin countries: Canada
- Surface area: 146.1 ha (361 acres)
- Max. depth: 9.52 m (31.2 ft)
- Shore length^{1}: 9.5 km (5.9 mi)
- Surface elevation: 728 m (2,388 ft)
- Settlements: Cannington Lake
- ^{1} Shore length is not a well-defined measure.

Cannington Lake is lake in the Canadian province of Saskatchewan. It is situated at the eastern end of the Moose Mountain Upland in the aspen parkland ecoregion. The western part of the lake is on the White Bear Indian reserve and the eastern part is in the Rural Municipality of Moose Mountain No. 63. The hamlet of Cannington Lake is located at the north-east corner of the lake and the nearest highway is 603.

The lake is fed by several small creeks with an unnamed creek flowing out into the Antler River. Beaver damming has had an effect on lake levels resulting in the water levels to decline significantly. Lower lake levels resulted in people abandoning the community of Cannington Lake. Beaver control measures have restored lake levels but the community and recreational facilities at the lake never recovered.

While there is no longer a formal recreation site at the lake, activities such as canoeing, kayaking, hiking, and fishing are still possible. There is a 3.7-kilometre (2.3 mi) long nature loop path on the lake's eastern shore and access to trail head and lake are at the north-eastern corner.

== See also ==
- List of lakes of Saskatchewan
- Tourism in Saskatchewan
