= Cannington Lake =

Community in Saskatchewan, Canada

- Special service area
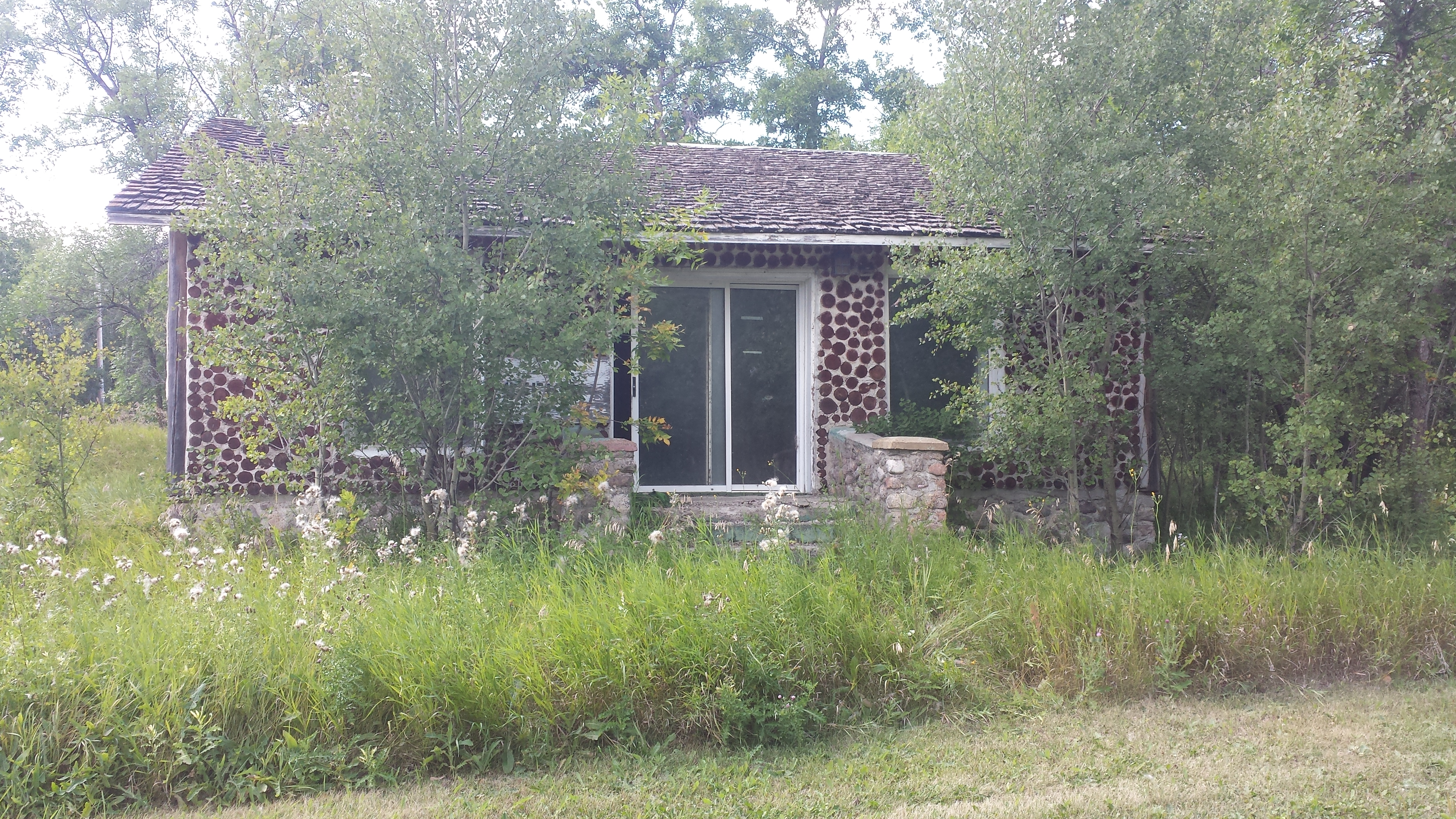
- Abandoned cabin at Cannington Lake Resort

- Location within Saskatchewan Location within Canada
- Coordinates: 49°46′58″N 102°09′37″W
- Country: Canada
- Province: Saskatchewan
- Region: South-east
- Census division: 1
- Rural Municipality: Moose Mountain
- Special service area: 1 January 2025

Government
  - Governing body: Rural Municipality of Moose Mountain
  - MP: Robert Kitchen
  - MLA: Dan D'Autremont
- Elevation: 734 m (2,408 ft)

Population (2016)
  - Total: 0
- Time zone: CST
- Area code: 306
- Highways: Highway 603

Cannington Lake, also known as Cannington Lake Resort, is a special service area within the Rural Municipality of Moose Mountain No. 63 in the Canadian province of Saskatchewan at the northeast corner of Cannington Lake. Listed as a designated place by Statistics Canada, the community had a population of 0 in the Canada 2011 Census.

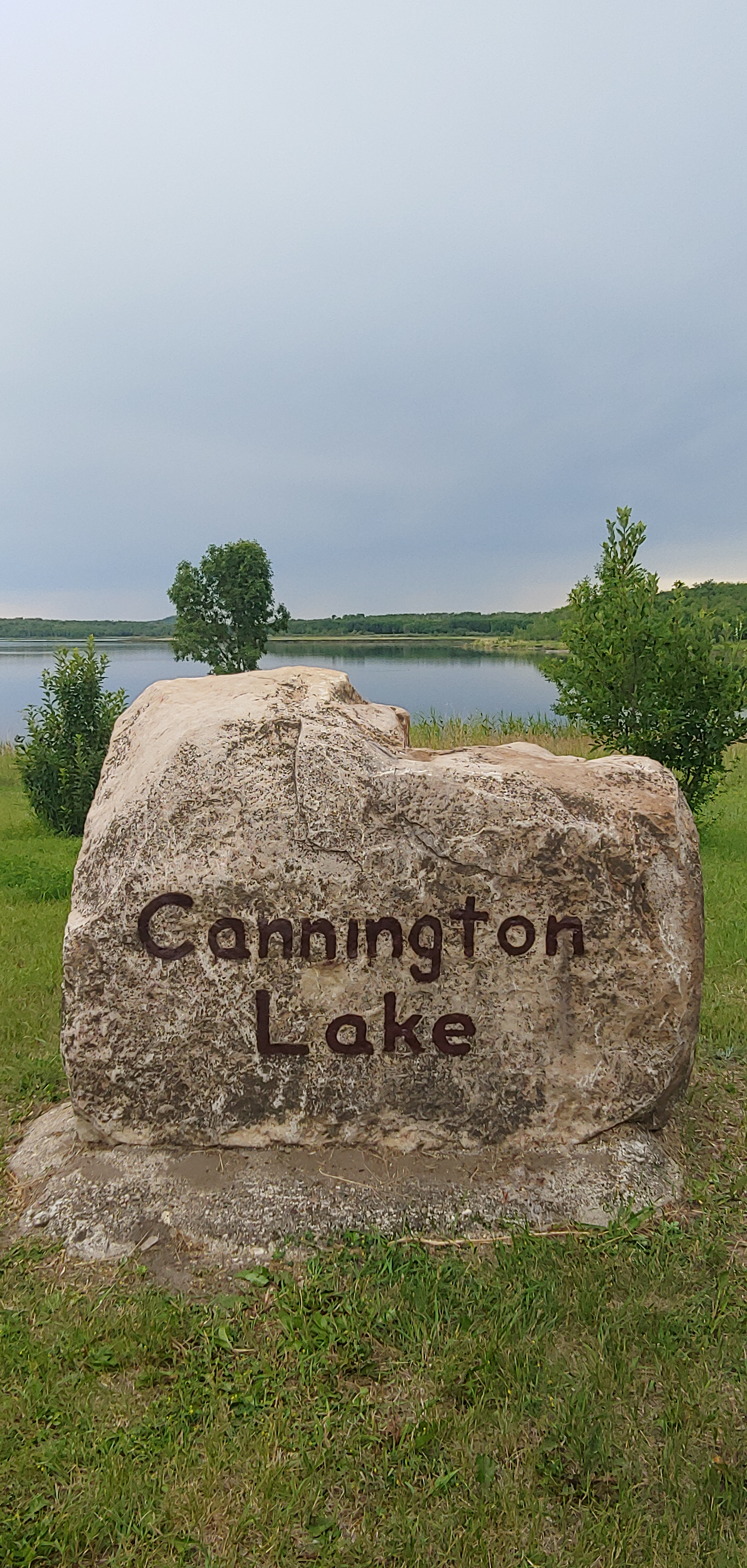

The resort is on the northeastern shore of the lake and has over 20 lots owned, with six occupied cabins. The 2016 Canada Census does not list a population for Cannington Lake, only for the RM of Moose Mountain, which was 492 in 2016.

== History ==
Cannington Lake was once a popular resort as the population would grow during the summer months. Until the 1980s, it was home to several campsites, barbecue areas, two boat launches, a beach, several rentable cabins, a miniature golf course, and other services. In the 1960s, Ed McCullough had wanted to build a ski hill north of the lake and had purchased the CPR railway station from the nearby town of Carlyle for the project. The movers got the railway station as far as Cannington then refused to move it up the hill, so the project was never completed. Over the years the lake water levels declined severely due to beaver damming, resulting in many of the residents moving their cabins away. Other nearby lakes, such as White Bear (Carlyle) Lake and Kenosee Lake have had similar issues with beaver dams. The lake levels have been on the rise in recent years due to beaver control measures.

Cannington Lake's status was changed from organized hamlet to special service area on 1 January 2025.

== Demographics ==
Canada census – Cannington Lake community profile

	2011
Population	0 (- 100.0% from 2006)
Land area	0.16 km^{2} (0.062 sq mi)
Population density
Median age
Private dwellings
Median household income	$N/A

References: 2011

== See also ==
- List of communities in Saskatchewan
- Tourism in Saskatchewan
