= White Bear (Carlyle) Lake =

Lake in Saskatchewan, Canada

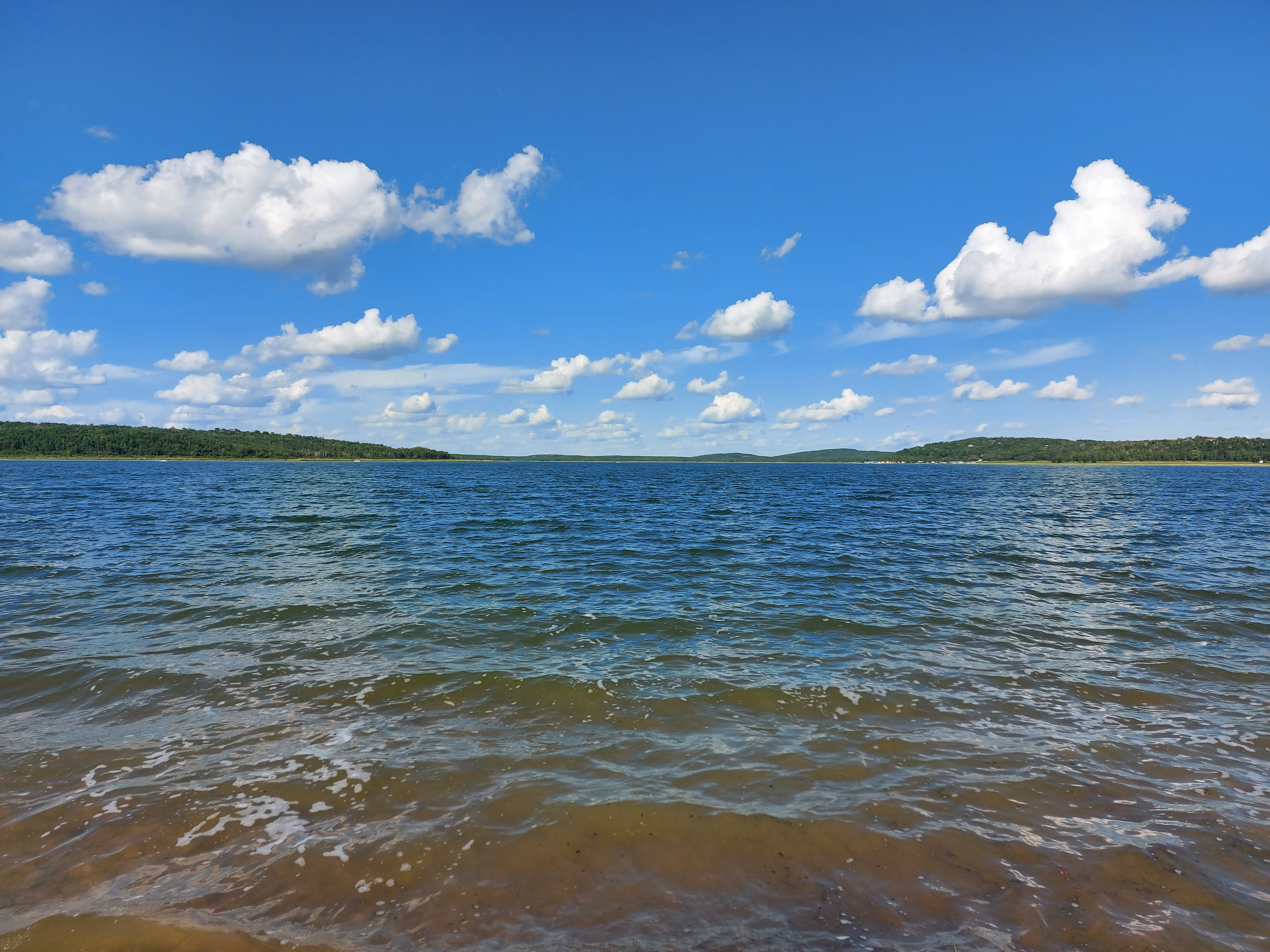
- White Bear (Carlyle) Lake

- Location in Saskatchewan White Bear (Carlyle) Lake (Canada)
- Location: White Bear 70, Saskatchewan
- Coordinates: 49.7683°N 102.2665°W
- Part of: Red River drainage basin
- River sources: Moose Mountain Upland
- Primary outflows: None
- Basin countries: Canada
- Surface area: 893 ha (2,210 acres)
- Max. depth: 15.3 m (50 ft)
- Shore length^{1}: 27.5 km (17.1 mi)
- Surface elevation: 734 m (2,408 ft)
- ^{1} Shore length is not a well-defined measure.

White Bear (Carlyle) Lake is a closed-basin lake in the Moose Mountain Upland. It is the largest lake on the plateau, slightly larger than its neighbour, Kenosee Lake. White Bear (Carlyle) Lake is within the White Bear 70 Indian reserve and Carlyle Lake Resort is along the southern shore. The lake and its amenities are accessed from Highway 9.

Originally the lake was named "Carlyle Lake" by the first European settlers to the area. In the late 1970s control of the lake was handed over to the White Bear First Nations and at that time the lake was renamed as White Bear (Carlyle) Lake.

== Water levels ==
Beaver are not native to Moose Mountain. In 1923, two breeding pairs from Hudson Bay, Saskatchewan, were brought to nearby Kenosee Lake. The beavers flourished and soon dams were blocking not just inflow creeks to Kenosee Lake, but to White Bear as well. According to aerial photographs, the surface elevation of White Bear (Carlyle) Lake in 1928 was 737 metres (2,418 ft). By 1945, it had dropped to 732 metres (2,402 ft). In 1954, four beaver dams in the area were destroyed, which helped raise lake levels. By the late 1950s, the lake recovered to 735 metres (2,411 ft). Without continued intervention regarding dams, the lake level began to fall again and, by 2008, it had dropped to 728 metres (2,388 ft).

In 2008, the Moose Mountain Water Resource Management Corp. partnered with Moose Mountain Provincial Park to control beavers in and around the park through trapping and by blasting beaver dams. Once again lake levels began to rise. As a result of the efforts, between 2010 and 2017 White Bear (Carlyle) Lake rose six to eight feet. The eventual goal is to raise Kenosee Lake levels enough so that it flows into White Bear (Carlyle) Lake, which hasn't happened since 1928.

== Fish species ==
Walleye are commonly found in White Bear (Carlyle) Lake.

== See also ==
- List of lakes of Saskatchewan
