= Bear Claw Casino & Hotel =

Casino in Saskatchewan, Canada

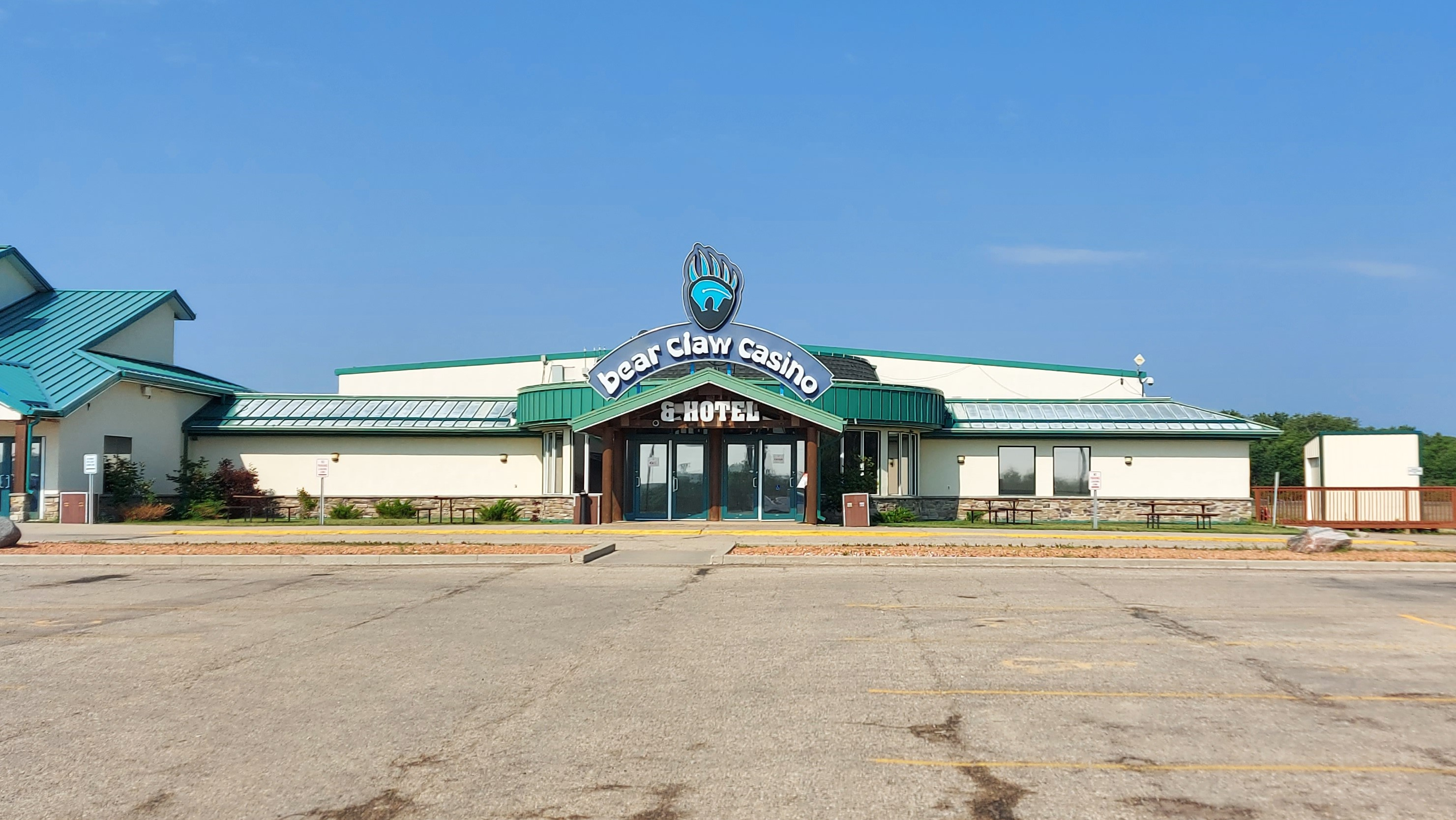
- Interactive map of Bear Claw Casino & Hotel
- Location: White Bear First Nation near Carlyle, Saskatchewan, Canada; 49.7610°N 102.2922°W
- Opened: 1993
- Gaming space: 2,800 m² (30,000 square foot)
- Notable restaurants: Growlers Restaurant and Lounge
- Casino type: Land
- Owner: Saskatchewan Indian Gaming Authority
- Renovated in: 2010
- Website: www.bearclawcasino.ca

Bear Claw Casino & Hotel is a small casino located on the White Bear First Nations near Moose Mountain Provincial Park and Carlyle, Saskatchewan, Canada, in the Moose Mountain Upland. The 2,800 m^{2} (30,000 sq ft) facility includes a casino (with 132 slot machines and 4 table games), lounge and family restaurant, a 35-room hotel, and stalls for campers. Access is from Highway 9.

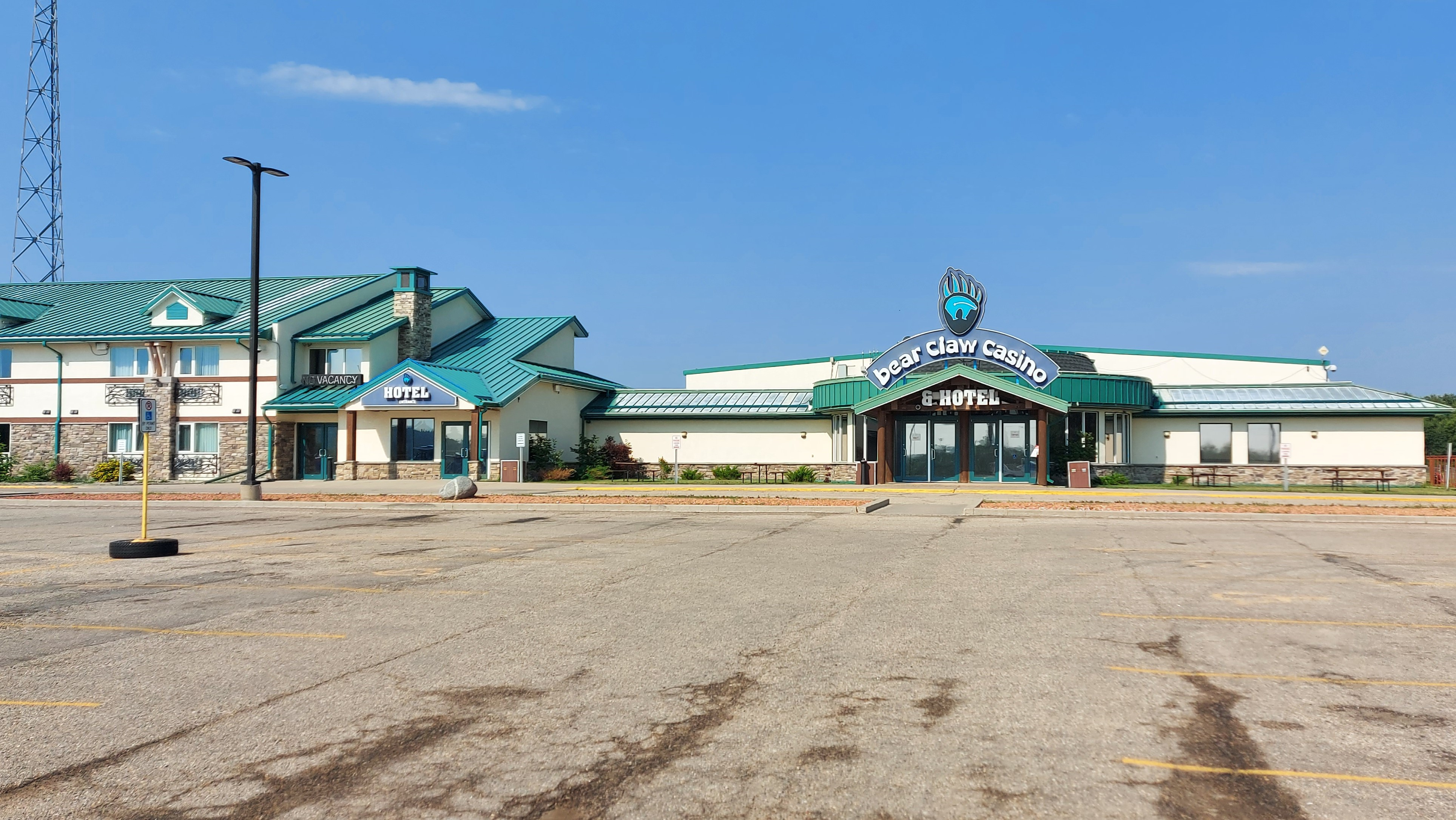
Bear Claw Casino & Hotel

It was the first casino in Saskatchewan operated by a First Nations group to open in the province in 1993; at that time, it was caught up in a legal battle between the local First Nations group and the province over jurisdiction. The casino opened in 1993 in the club house of the White Bear Golf Course. It moved into its current location in 1996.

In 2010, the 35-room hotel adjacent to the casino was transferred from the White Bear First Nation to SIGA, and underwent a complete renovation.

== See also ==
- List of casinos in Canada
