= White Bear 70 =

Indian reserve in Saskatchewan, Canada

Coordinates: 49°45′40″N 102°15′05″W

- Indian reserve
- White Bear Indian Reserve No. 70
- Location in Saskatchewan
- First Nation: White Bear
- Country: Canada
- Province: Saskatchewan

Area
  - Total: 17,192.2 ha (42,483 acres)

Population (2016)
  - Total: 691
  - Density: 4.02/km^{2} (10.4/sq mi)
- Community Well-Being Index: 60

White Bear 70 is an Indian reserve of the White Bear First Nations in Saskatchewan. It is along Highway 9 about 13 kilometres (8.1 mi) north of Carlyle, is adjacent to Moose Mountain Provincial Park, and surrounds White Bear (Carlyle) Lake. It encompasses a total of 12,038.4 ha (29,748 acres). In the 2016 Canadian Census, it recorded a population of 691 living in 237 of its 972 total private dwellings. In the same year, its Community Well-Being index was calculated at 60 of 100, compared to 58.4 for the average First Nations community and 77.5 for the average non-Indigenous community.

The White Bear First Nations signed on to Treaty 4 in 1875 and in 1877 White Bear 70 was established on the east side of Moose Mountain Upland. In the late 1970s, Carlyle Lake Resort became part of the reserve. Since then, several economic developments have occurred on the reserve, such as the opening of White Bear Golf Course, Bear Claw Casino & Hotel, and the founding of White Bear Oil and Gas, Ltd.

== See also ==
- List of Indian reserves in Saskatchewan
- Pheasant Rump Nakota First Nation
- Ocean Man First Nation
