= White Bear First Nations =

First Nation in Saskatchewan, Canada

- Band No. 365
- People: Cree, Saulteaux, Nakota, Dakota
- Treaty: Treaty 4
- Headquarters: Carlyle
- Province: Saskatchewan

Land
- Other reserve: White Bear 70
- Land area: 171.922 km^{2} (66.379 sq mi)

Population (2020)
- On reserve: 867
- Off reserve: 1938
- Total population: 2805

Government
- Chief: Chief Jon Pasap

Website
- https://www.whitebearfirstnation.ca/index

The White Bear First Nations (Cree: ᐚᐱ ᒪᐢᑿ, romanized: wâpi-maskwa, Assiniboine: Matóska oyáde) are a First Nation band government in southeastern Saskatchewan, Canada.

== Etymology ==
The Nation bears the name of its Chief Wahpiimusqua (1815-1900, wâpimaskwa, "white bear"), who signed an adhesion to Treaty 4 in 1875. Despite this, he ultimately settled next to Moose Mountain Provincial Park with his band, which is in the Treaty 2 area.

== Reserves ==
- White Bear 70
- Treaty Four Reserve Grounds 77 (shared between 33 First Nations)
