= Rama, Saskatchewan =

Village in Saskatchewan, Canada

Rama
- Village
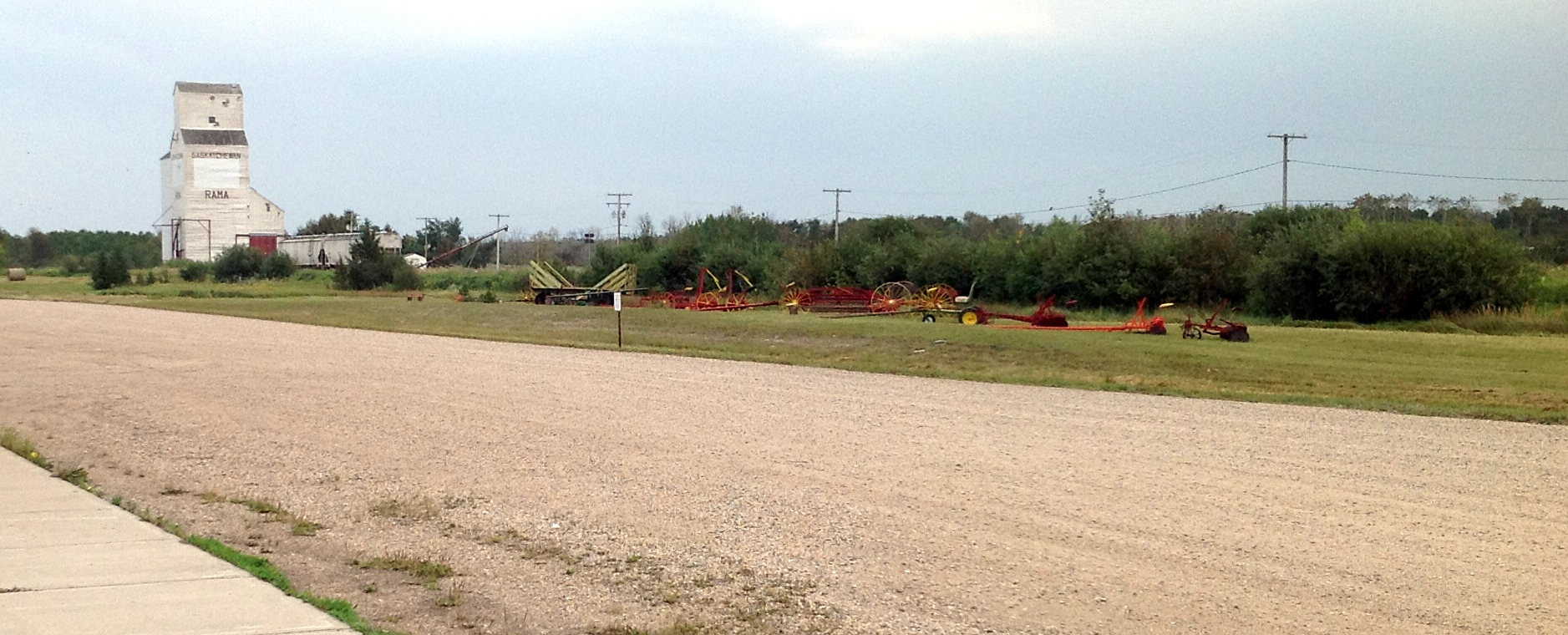
- Former Saskatchewan Wheat Pool grain elevator in Rama

- Rama in Saskatchewan Rama (Canada)
- Coordinates: 51°45′28″N 103°0′3″W
- Country: Canada
- Province: Saskatchewan
- Census division: 9
- Region: East-central
- Rural municipality: Invermay No. 305
- First area surveys: 1890
- First post office: 1908
- Incorporated (village): December 18, 1919
- First named: 1907
- Founded by: John Anderson Berge
- Named after: Norwegian Ram

Government
  - Type: Mayor-Council
  - Body: Rama Village Council
  - Mayor: Phillip Shewchuk

Area
  - Village: 0.67 km^{2} (0.26 sq mi)
  - Land: 0.653 km^{2} (0.252 sq mi)
  - Water: 0.017 km^{2} (0.0066 sq mi) 2.37%

Dimensions
  - Length: 0.800 km (0.497 mi)
  - Width: 0.870 km (0.541 mi)
- Elevation: 553 m (1,814 ft)
- Highest elevation: 563.5 m (1,849 ft)
- Lowest elevation: 549 m (1,801 ft)

Population (2021)
  - Urban: 70
- Time zone: UTC-6 (CST)
  - Summer (DST): UTC-6 (CST (No DST))
- Postal code: S0A 3H0 / S0A 0G6
- Area Codes: 306 / 639
- ISO 3166 code: CA-SK
- Highways: Highway 5 / Highway 754
- Waterways & Rivers: Whitesand River, Spirit Creek
- NTS Mapsheets: 062M15 - Preeceville and 062M14 - Margo
- GNBC Code: HAIJI
- Federal Electoral District: Yorkton—Melville
- Provincial Electoral District: Canora-Pelly.

Rama (2021 population: 70) is a village in the Canadian province of Saskatchewan within the Rural Municipality of Invermay No. 305 and Census Division No. 9. It is located 44 km west of Canora and 60 km east of Wadena at the intersection of Highway 5 and Highway 754 in the Touchwood Hills area of Saskatchewan.

Rama is on the banks of a tributary of Spirit Creek, which is a tributary of the Whitesand River. The Spirit Creek Dam and its reservoir are located just east of the village.

== History ==
=== Community name ===
The rail siding and passenger platform at what is now the village was named Rama in 1904 by Canadian Northern Railways. Saskatchewan Wheat Pool archives show the name was from the Rama area of Ontario. The municipal corporation has been named Rama since its inception in 1919, but the name was not declared official by other levels of government until years later, in 1956.

While other names such as Silver Hill (1907) were discussed for the village or school district they were ultimately passed over and for simplicity's sake the decision was made to keep with the name already given to the train platform and siding there.

Rama is assigned a UN/LOCODE of CA-RMA.

=== Doukhobors ===
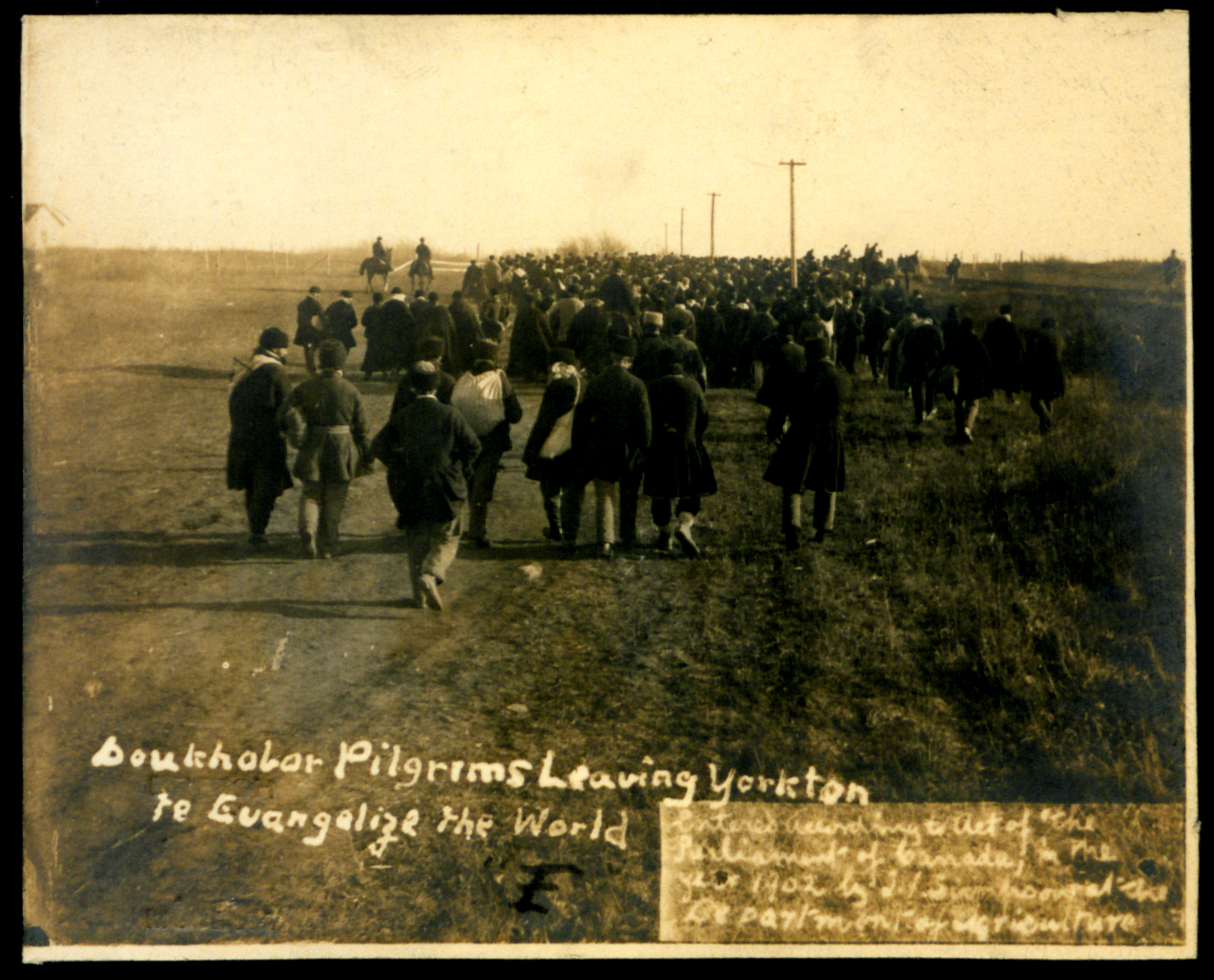
Doukhobor pilgrims leaving Yorkton to evangelize the world, 1902

Until 1899, a large area directly to the east of Rama, around the north end of Good Spirit Lake, was reserved for the Doukhobors; this reserve was called the Good Spirit Lake Annex. It was part of the South Colony. The people settled eight communal villages in this area of almost 170,000 acres.

Decisions of the Canadian government in early 1907 caused almost all of these communal farm villages to be deserted for individual homesteads by 1918. The families moved on to southern British Columbia or to individual farmsteads.

=== Homesteading and surveys ===
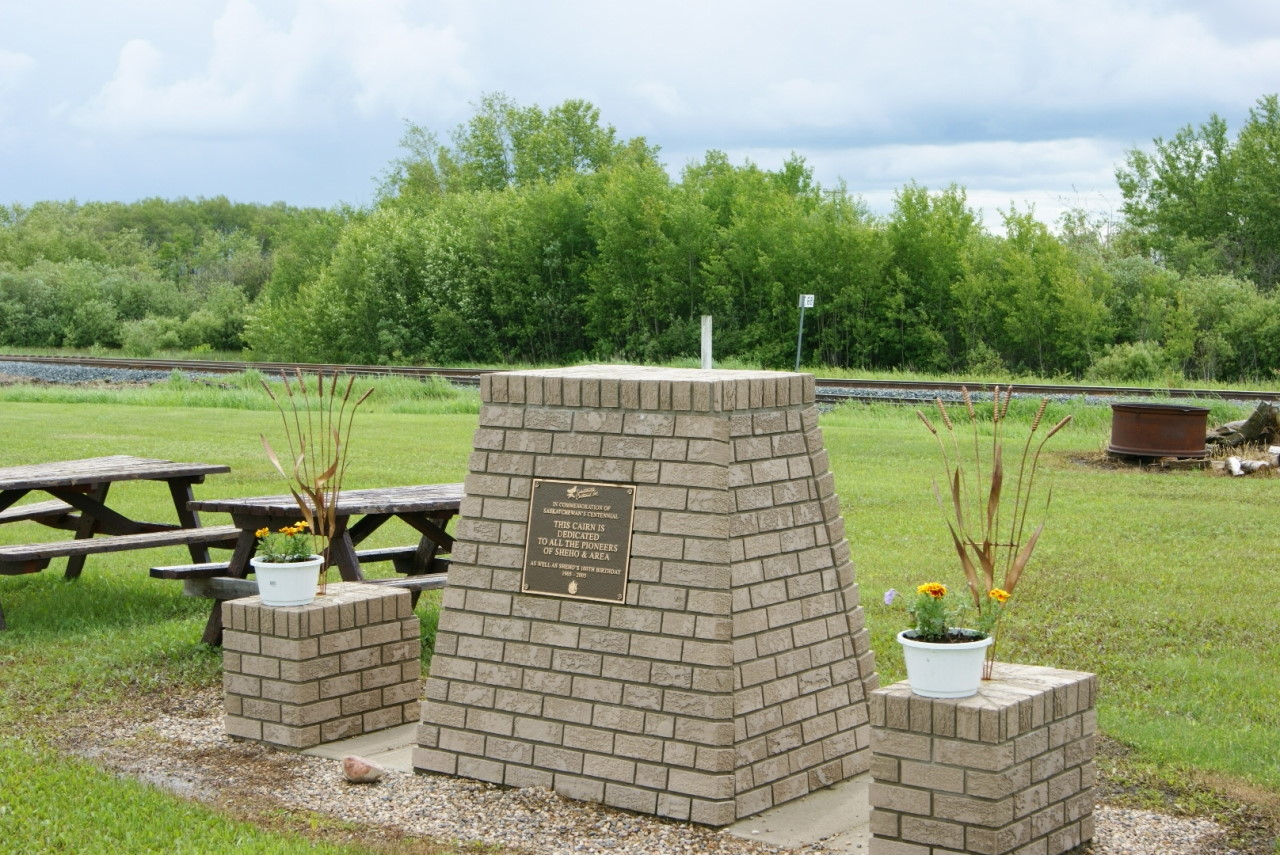
Sheho Cairn

Rama incorporated as a village on December 18, 1919. The first British-Canadian surveys in the Assiniboia district were completed in this area for the British crown by around 1879, by 1890 the provisional government began to encourage European immigration to the area.

At about the same time the site for Rama was being surveyed, a large wave of immigrant homesteaders were coming to the province from all over the world.

The settlers who arrived to homestead in the area of Rama were largely of Eastern European origin. Some of the first area families lived south of the town site. They were documented as the Landstads, Murrays, Deans, and Lockharts, all on or near the former Pelly Trail to the south of Rama. John Berge (and family) are listed as homesteaders in the area near the rail siding.

=== Timeline ===
Timeline of notable events in Rama

- 1690 - Henry Kelsey, a British explorer for the HBC, is guided by First Nations People on his journey deep into the Assiniboine River area. His mission was to meet with the area First Nations people in an effort to encourage them to bring furs east to be traded at York Factory (on the shores of Hudson Bay). Kelsey was the first British person to explore the plains of Canada and this area of Saskatchewan.
- 1899 — The area immediately to the east of present-day Rama (Buchanan, Canora, Kamsack, Veregin area) is turned into the Doukhobor South Reserve and Devil's Lake Annex totalling almost 384,000 acres of land. The Doukhobors establish 38 villages in this area, most of which will be abandoned by the early 20th century.
- 1901 — Some of the first European settlers begin to arrive at the (then) end of the train line to the south in Sheho. It was then a sometimes weeks long oxen and cart ride north from Sheho across the Whitesand River and through the bush along the Pelly and other former cart and bison trails to Rama.
- 1903 — The first documented European settlement activity was in this year by Joseph E. Howes and R.D. Whitman.
- 1904 — The name Rama is selected by the CNR for this siding. The name Rama would not be declared official for the village until much later.

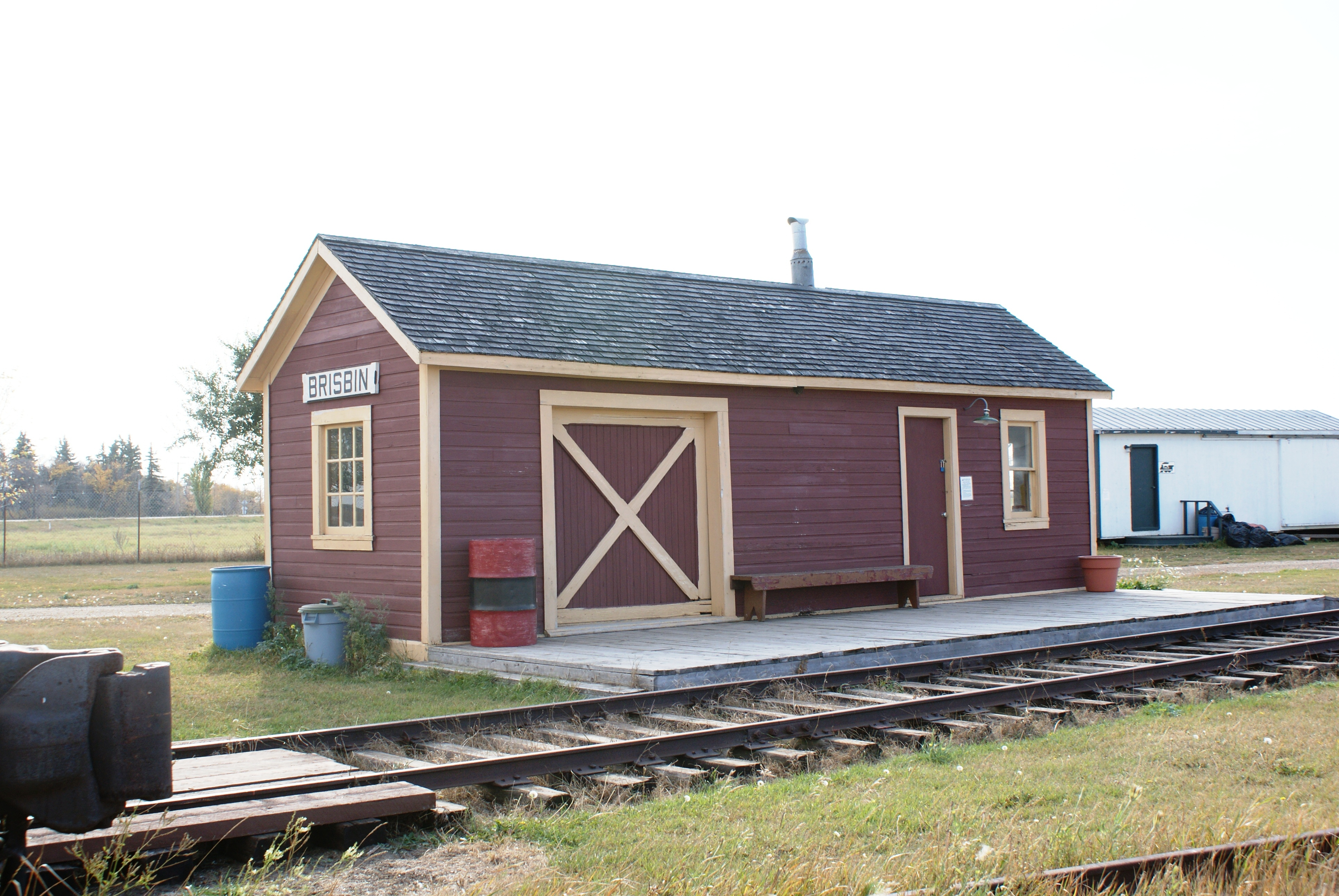
Canadian Northern Portable Train Station

- 1907 — John Berge is the first resident. Travellers journals at the time describe Rama as little more than the Berge family residence and the rail line sporting an unheated shed and passenger platform to wait for the train.
- 1908 — On April 9 Rama's Post Office opens its doors. John Berge is the postmaster.
- 1909 — January 12 is the first meeting for Rama School District #2249. John Berge is appointed chairman and J. B. Russell the secretary of the new school district.
- 1910 — 21 students are listed as being enrolled in the new Rama School.
- 1919 — The community continues to grow and is officially incorporated.
- 1919 — Telephones began being installed in private residences in Rama and the surrounding area by the Invermay Rural Telephone Company. To this day Rama shares telephone exchange 593 with neighbour Invermay.
- 1920 — The first Rama council meeting is held. S. Tritiak is head of the council (mayor).
- 1921 — Population 127.
- 1922 — Saint Anthony's R.C. parish is incorporated.
- 1922 — Construction of a dam on nearby Spirit Creek is tendered by CNR to C.G. Anderson of Norwood, M.B.
- 1927 — In January the Rama local of the United Farmers of Canada is formed.
- 1927 — Public passenger bus service becomes available as part of route from Tisdale to Yorkton.
- 1928 — A diphtheria outbreak causes many deaths locally and provincially. Populations in many areas, Rama included, see dramatic year over year decreases due to outbreak deaths.
- 1936 — The Ukrainian Greek Orthodox Church of St. Michael’s, now a designated historical landmark, is built at the southern edge of Rama.
- 1939 — Construction of Our Lady of Lourdes Grotto at St. Anthony's church begins.
- 1941 — Our Lady of Lourdes grotto holds its first pilgrimage.

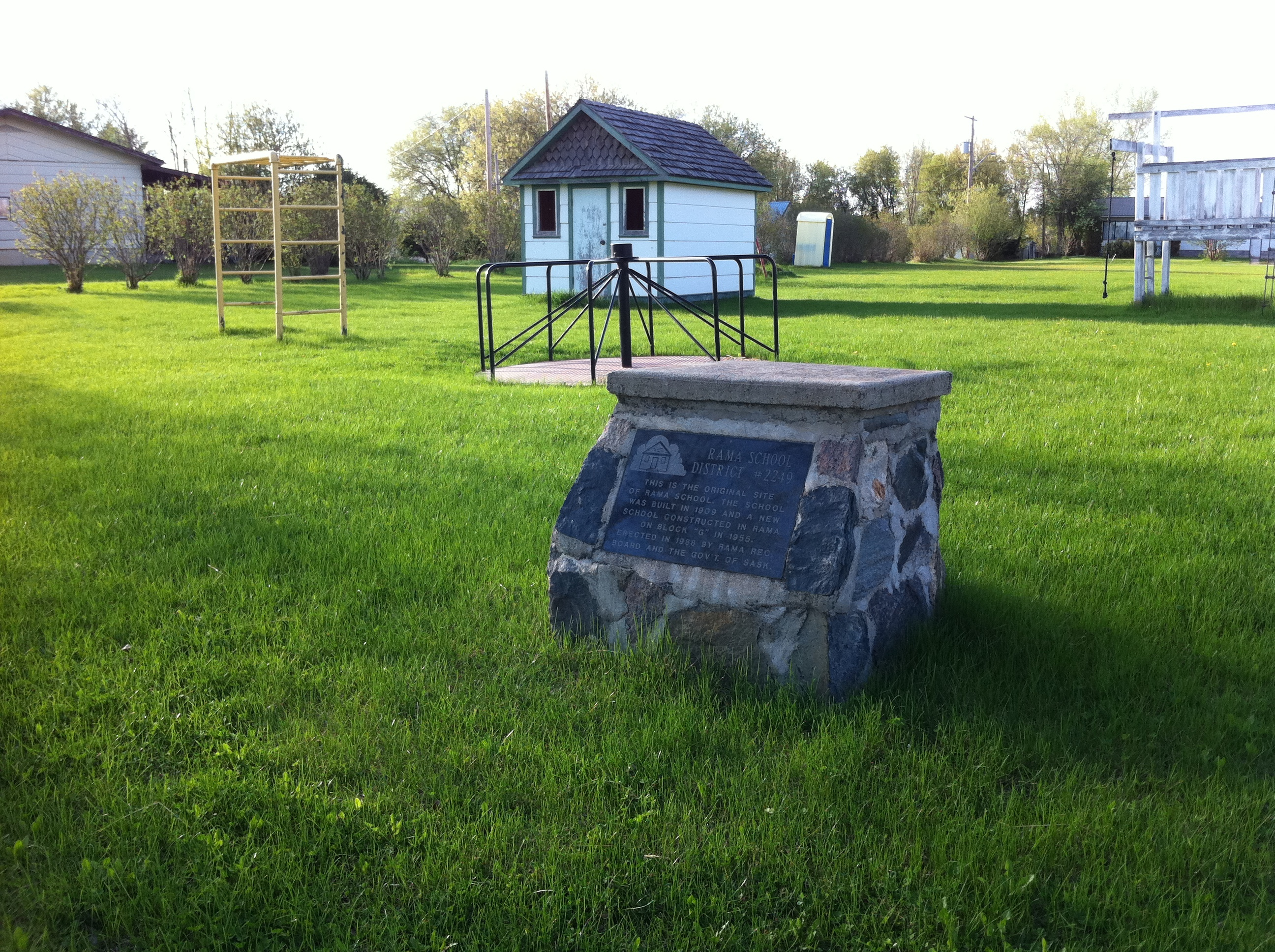
A marker for the Rama School District No. 2249, in Rama Park, with the scaled model schoolhouse in the background

- 1949 — May 17, land to construct a school at what became its final site is transferred from the village to the local school board. The building itself was not tendered for construction until 1955.
- 1951–1952 — Present day Highway 5, generally following the rail line instead of grid roads, is constructed from Buchanan to Invermay.
- 1956 — The survey plan of the community as it is today is officially approved and the name Rama officially declared by the Federal Government.
- 1959 — Renovations to the Grotto see stations of the cross added around the perimeter.
- 1960 — In April the final passenger service steam train, CNR 6062, passes Eastbound on its way to Winnipeg. Rail passenger service is discontinued from this point on.
- 1961 — 288 people now live in the village. 200 students from Rama and the surrounding area are enrolled in Rama School. This is the peak of the population for the village.
- 1965 — Many surrounding country schools held their final classes in the spring seeing students travel to Rama for education that fall. School enrollment declines steadily from this point on.
- 1972 — Armed with a $9,000 grant from the federal government, the Recreation Board in Rama embarks on a project to build a skating rink.
- 1975 — A large fire destroys both grain elevators in town.
- 1976 — The Saskatchewan Wheat Pool moves an elevator from Tuffnell and an elevator annex from Buchanan to replace the buildings burned the previous year.
- 1985 — An addition to the public school sees a school library and classroom as well as staff facilities added and updated.
- 1988 — The Rama Rec. Board and Gov't of Sask. dedicates a monument to the original Rama School at the new Rama Park created on the original school site on Front Street.
- 1994 — The Ukrainian Greek Orthodox church of St. Michael's is declared a historical landmark.
- 2000 — Big Sky wins environmental approval to construct a hog rearing operation nearby.
- 2002 — The village council decides to connect the village water system to the Canora Rural Utility Board's water pipeline and consequently sell the village's water reservoir on Spirit Creek to Big Sky pork farms. This decision eventually received government approval.
- 2003 — Residents are asked to participate in a first of its kind scientific odour study. The study is commissioned because of a smell related to the hog manure slurry being injected into area land as fertilizer. This hog manure is sourced from large, open air, outdoor lagoons.
- 2009 — Falling pork prices cause Big Sky to fall into receivership. This affects many area farmers who were feed suppliers to Big Sky's hog operation.
- 2013 — With the help of new donors, renovations to the Grotto of our Lady of Lourdes sees the stonework rebuilt, landscaping repaired and new statues dedicated. Highway signage directing visitors to the grotto is added on the highway by the church and its parishioners.
- 2013 — Big Sky Farms again finds difficulty in the international hog markets causing it to once again be forced into receivership. Olymel LP becomes Big Sky's partner as a result of the receivership. The resultant partnership; Olysky LP; now controls Big Sky's commercial hog rearing operations.
- 2016 — March 13. Dave Kory and the rest of the village look on as the former skating arena and home of Dave Kory Performance Horses burns.
- 2017 — May 31. Saskatchewan Transportation Company bus service is discontinued, ending public transportation to Rama for the first time since 1927.

== Geography ==
Rama is located on the banks of a tributary of Spirit Creek and is found at the junction of Highways 5 and 754 in Saskatchewan's aspen parkland region. This area is part of the east central region of the province.

Growing zones are geographical areas which are generally determined by the lowest sustained temperature in that area achieved during the year and other climate variables. Rama and the surrounding area finds itself in Growing Zone 1b.

Growing zone 1 is defined as having the lowest temperature achieved of below -45.6 °C or -50 °F with the first frost usually occurring by September 12 and the last frost of the spring on or about May 22.

Saskatchewan Ministry of Agriculture studies show the available Corn Heat Units in this area to be in the 1,401-1,800 range. While suitable for silage, these conditions are quite unfavorable to grow corn in.

The soils in the community and the nearby farmland are generally black with a heavy clay base. Growing seasons are short and high soil PH (alkalinity) are challenging growing conditions for many types crops, trees and plants. Despite these challenges, cereal crop production often exceeds other areas of the province. In the 1950s, the Canora area held nearly 500 country elevators within a 30 miles radius in order to handle all the grain produced from the region.

=== Climate ===
Being located in the middle of North America has its advantages and disadvantages. For example, Saskatchewan is located so far away from any large bodies of water (Great Lakes, Pacific Ocean, Atlantic Ocean) that any moderating effect these bodies of water would have on the temperature here is negligible. Because of this, Saskatchewan as a whole is considered to have a temperate continental climate. In the summer the days are very long and hot, in the winter the days become shorter and very cold, making for a temperature range that can exceed 65 °C or more.

Hours of sunlight and frequently clear skies are an important feature of the climate here. Hours of sunlight typically exceeding 2,300 hours annually.

== Demographics ==
Population history (1981–2016)
Year	Pop.	±%
1981	133	—
1986	130	−2.3%
1991	121	−6.9%
1996	99	−18.2%
2001	90	−9.1%
2006	75	−16.7%
2011	75	+0.0%
2016	80	+6.7%
2021	70	−12.5%
Source: Statistics Canada via Saskatchewan Bureau of Statistics

In the 2021 Census of Population conducted by Statistics Canada, Rama had a population of 70 living in 31 of its 37 total private dwellings, a change of −12.5% from its 2016 population of 80. With a land area of 0.67 km^{2} (0.26 sq mi), it had a population density of 104.5/km^{2} (270.6/sq mi) in 2021.

In the 2016 Census of Population, the Village of Rama recorded a population of 80 living in 38 of its 48 total private dwellings, a 6.3% change from its 2011 population of 75. With a land area of 0.67 km^{2} (0.26 sq mi), it had a population density of 119.4/km^{2} (309.3/sq mi) in 2016.

== Economy ==
Industry in the community consists mainly of 'family' or corporate farming with several small and medium-sized farming support businesses. While self-employment in farming is the generally accepted occupation in the area, Olysky and the Rama Co-Operative Assoc., as well as area farms, also provide employment opportunities to area residents and newcomers looking for work.

== Tourism and recreation ==
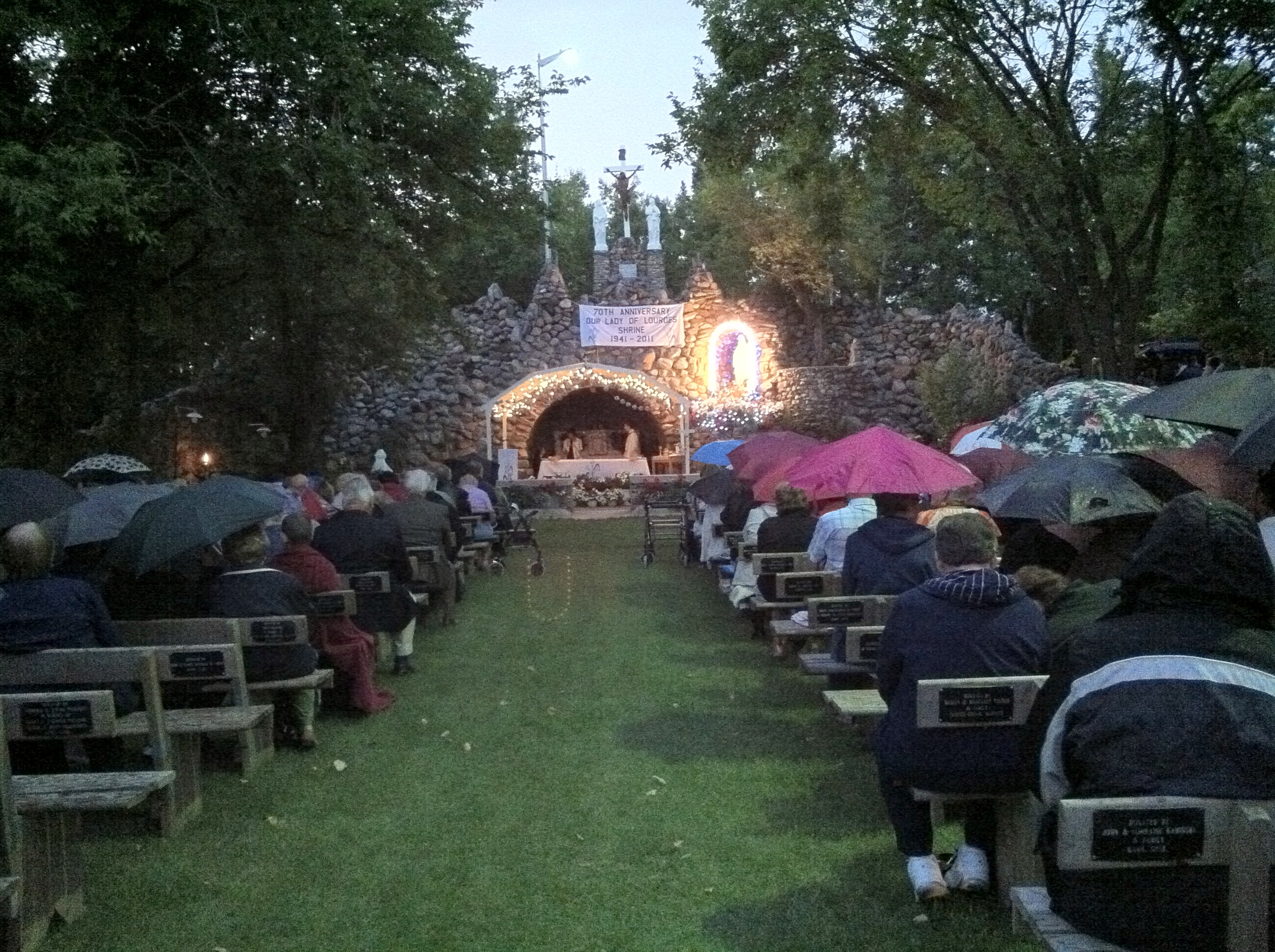
The annual pilgrimage in Rama

=== Shrine of Our Lady of Lourdes ===
Located in Rama is the Shrine of Our Lady of Lourdes, an homage to the Sanctuary of Our Lady of Lourdes in Lourdes, France.

Many of these grottoes in Saskatchewan and eastern Alberta were created by Fr. Anthony Sylla and his parishioners.

Sylla arrived in Saskatchewan in 1909 and by 1933 was in charge of the parish in Rama. By 1939 he began to establish the shrine and pilgrimage site. The shrine was largely completed during the next two years. Updates, landscaping changes, and additions to the grounds have continued gradually until today. Every year on August 14 and 15 (since 1941) St. Anthony's parish holds a 'pilgrimage'. Mass is held in several languages, and a candlelight procession occurs. The shrine in Rama is located west of St. Anthony's church.

=== Old-fashioned farming ===
Heritage horse drawn seeding and farming demonstrations are held in the village annually in the spring and fall (seeding and harvest). Teamsters hitch their horses up to vintage farm equipment such as discs, seeders, and ploughs as spectators watch horse powered farming.

=== The outdoors ===
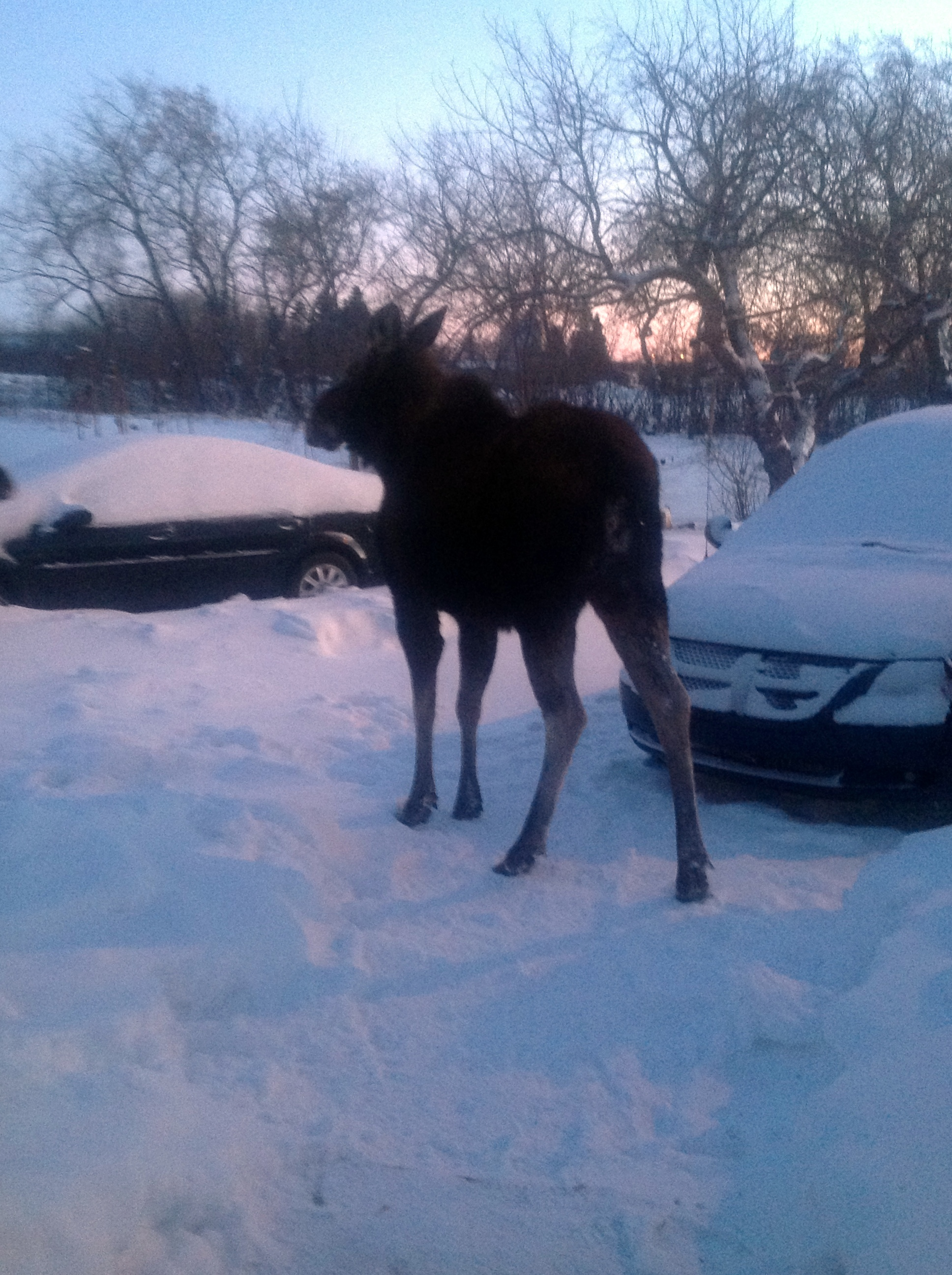
Moose wintering in Rama, 2013

The farmland gives way to many lakes and rivers fed by streams, swamps, and other wetlands. Ducks, geese and many other migratory birds congregate here and in the nearby Quill Lakes area during the spring and fall migrations. In the fall, hunters from the local area as well as visitors from other provinces, the United States, and around the world come to this area for the birds and many other game animals.

Loal parks and recreational opportunities include Good Spirit Lake Provincial Park, Whitesand Regional Park, Camp Whitesand, and Leslie Beach.

=== Winter and sports ===
Winter recreational activities include snowmobiling with an extensive network of groomed trails. The surrounding area offers activities such as hockey, curling, Ukrainian Dance, figure skating, and softball to name a few. Rama is former home of the Rama Rams softball team and the Rama Rebels recreational hockey club.

== Notable people ==
- Stanley Korchinski (1929-2000), MP for the riding of Mackenzie 1958–1984
- Ken Kotyk, 2x IBSF World Champion Bobsledder who competed for Canada at the 2006 Winter Olympics placing fourth in the four-man event
- Ken Krawetz, Saskatchewan MLA for the riding of Canora-Pelly 1995–2016
- Barry Nieckar, played seven games in the NHL between the Calgary Flames, Hartford Whalers, and Mighty Ducks of Anaheim

== See also ==
- People from Rama
- List of francophone communities in Saskatchewan
- List of communities in Saskatchewan
- List of villages in Saskatchewan
