= Yorkton Creek =

River in Saskatchewan, Canada

Yorkton Creek Little Whitesand River
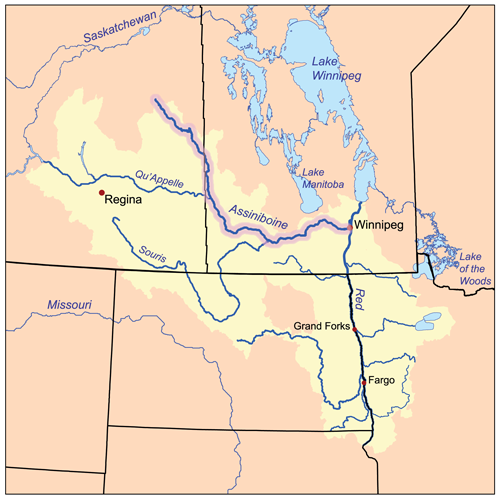
- Red River drainage basin, with the Assiniboine River highlighted

- Location of the mouth in Saskatchewan Yorkton Creek (Canada)

Location
- Country: Canada
- Provinces: Saskatchewan

Physical characteristics
- Source: Leech Lake
  - location: RM of Cana No. 214
  - coordinates: 51.0863°N 102.4559°W
  - elevation: 506 m (1,660 ft)
- Mouth: Whitesand River
  - location: RM of Good Lake No. 274
  - coordinates: 51.4006°N 102.5494°W
  - elevation: 477 m (1,565 ft)

Basin features
- River system: Assiniboine River drainage basin
- Tributaries
  - left: Cussed Creek
  - right: Crescent Creek

Yorkton Creek, formerly known as Little Whitesand River, is a river in the south-east region of the Canadian province of Saskatchewan. The river begins at Leech Lake, south of Yorkton, and flows north into the Whitesand River. The Whitesand River flows east into the Assiniboine River, which is a major tributary of the Red River. While Yorkton Creek begins at Leech Lake, its main tributary, Crescent Creek, has its headwaters in the Beaver Hills to the west.

== History ==
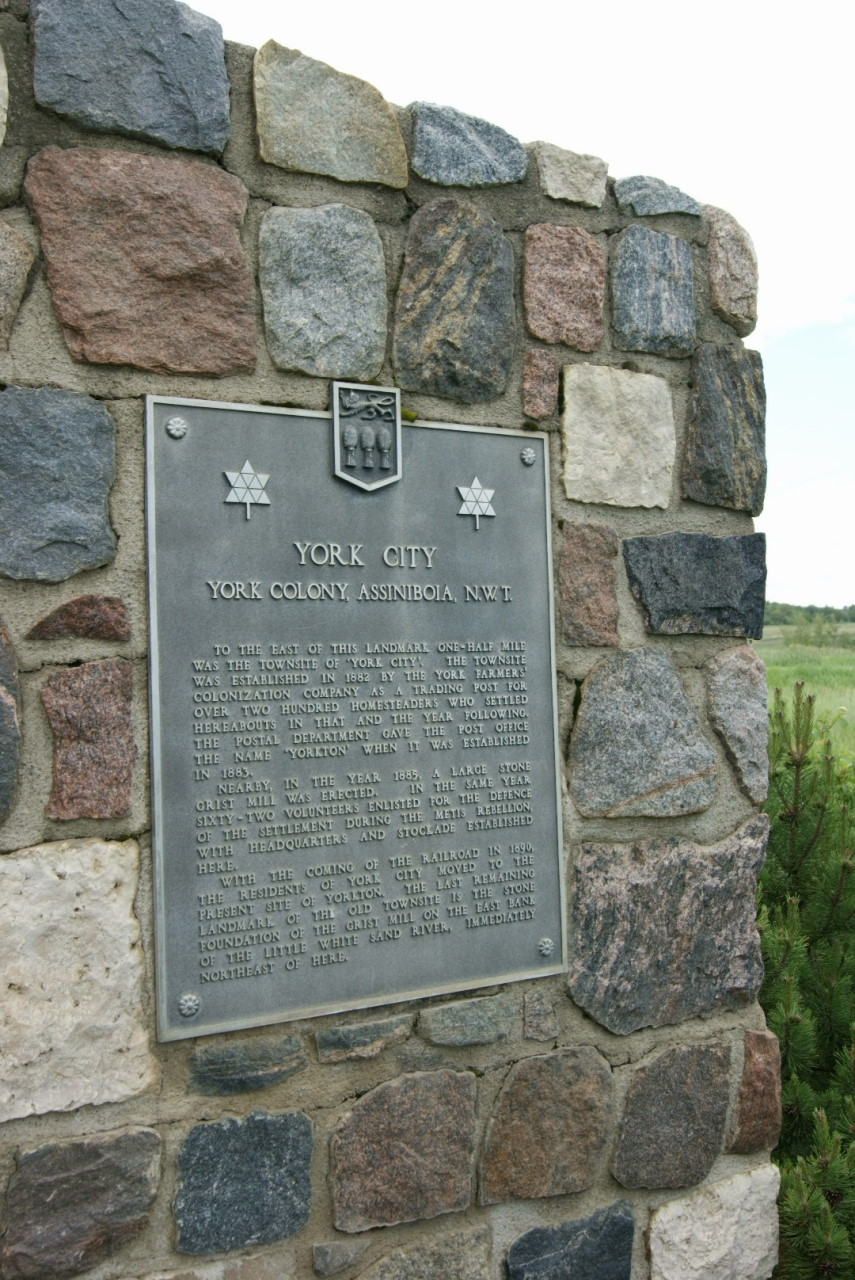
York City plaque

Plains Cree and Saulteaux First Nations inhabited both the Whitesand River and Yorkton Creek watersheds before the arrival of Europeans as archaeological evidence shows signs of encampment sites and hunting activity. With the signing of Treaty 4 at Fort Qu'Appelle in 1874, the land was opened up for settlement from Eastern Canada.

In 1882, a group of investors and settlers from York County in Ontario arrived in the area and set up York Colony on the banks of Little Whitesand River. Four men stayed that winter while the rest of the settlers returned to Eastern Canada. When the settlers returned in 1883, they named the community York City. Since there already was a York City in Ontario, when the post office opened on 1 January 1884, it was renamed Yorkton. A few years later, the Manitoba & North Western Railway was extending westward and the route was going to miss Yorkton. In 1888, the residents agreed to move the community to meet the railway. In 1890, the hamlet of Yorkton left the banks of the Little Whitesand River and moved south 4.6 km (2.9 mi) to its present location. The original townsite was located at 13-26-4 W2.

In the year 2000, Little Whitesand River was renamed Yorkton Creek.

== Description ==
Yorkton Creek begins at the eastern end of Leech Lake in the RM of Cana No. 214. From there, the river crosses Highway 9 and heads north towards Yorkton. On its way, it crosses Highway 16, is met by a tributary that comes from York Lake, and crosses Highway 10 before skirting the eastern edge of Yorkton and continuing north. Yorkton Creek follows Highway 9 northward before crossing the highway south of Ebenezer where it heads north-west towards the Whitesand River. Just before it meets the Whitesand River, it is joined by Cussed Creek in the RM of Good Lake No. 274. Besides the aforementioned rural munucipalies, the river also passes through RMs of Saltcoats No. 213, Wallace 243, and Orkney 244.

=== Tributaries ===
Crescent Creek begins in the Beaver Hills in the RM of Garry No. 245 and heads south-east towards Melville. In 1921, a dam was built along the course of Crescent Creek by the Canadian National Railway that created Crescent Creek Reservoir. Melville purchased the reservoir in 1958 for its drinking water supply. From the dam, Crescent Creek continues eastward and empties into Crescent Lake, which is connected to Leech Lake.

Willow Brook, like Crescent Creek, begins in the RM of Garry No. 245 and the Beaver Hills. It travels in an easterly direction into Rousay Lake, which flows into York Lake. A short river connects York Lake to Yorkton Creek.

Cussed Creek begins in the Beaver Hills in the RM of Foam Lake No. 276 and flows east and meets Yorkton Creek just before it empties into the Whitesand River. Cussed Creek crosses two major highways, 16 and 47. Sorefoot Creek, which also begins in the Beaver Hills, is a tributary of Cussed Creek and meets it near the Highway 47 crossing.

== See also ==
- List of rivers of Saskatchewan
- Hudson Bay drainage basin
