= Saskatchewan Highway 229 =

Provincial highway in Saskatchewan, Canada

Highway 229

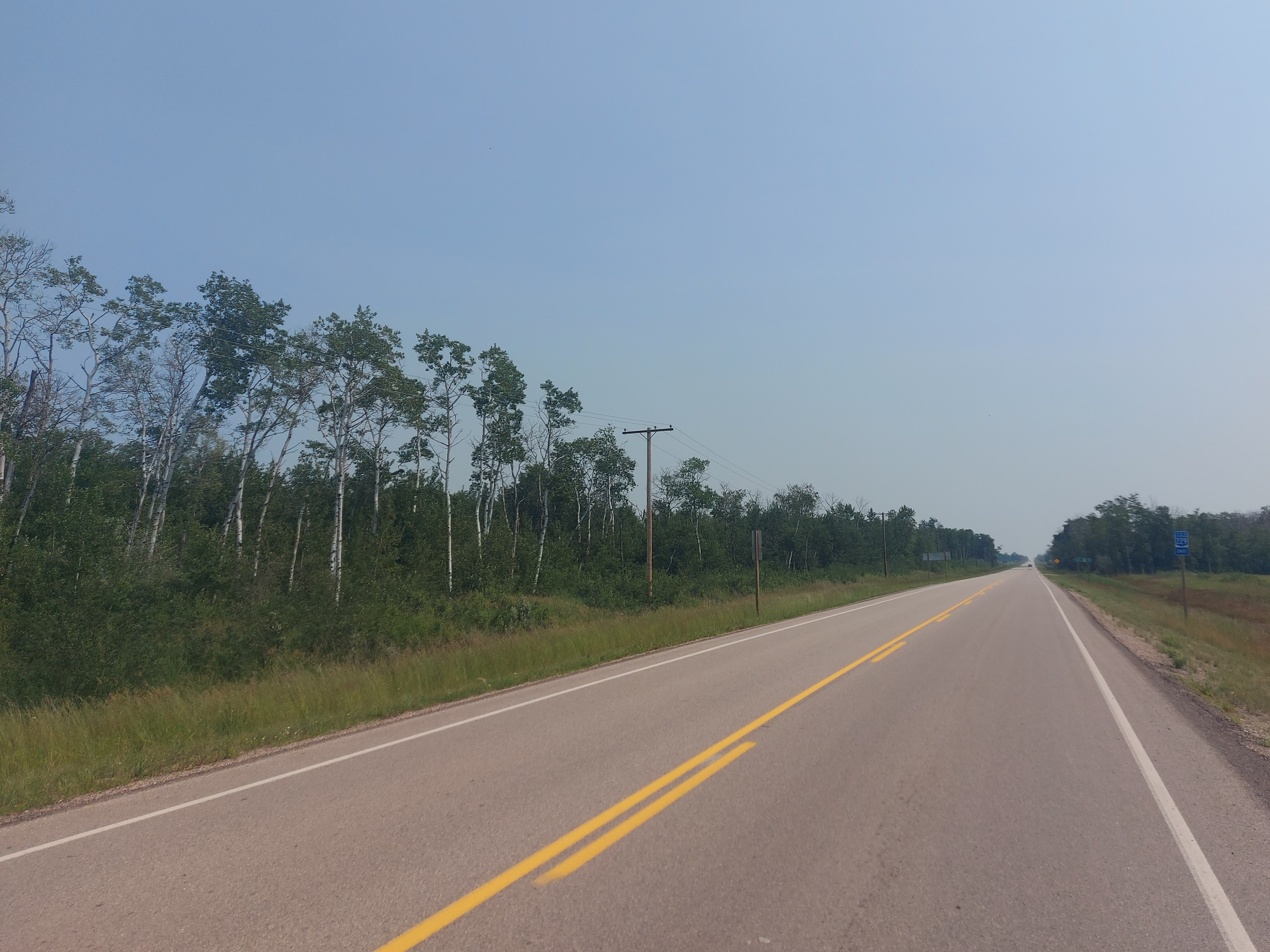
- Highway 229

Route information
- Maintained by Ministry of Highways and Infrastructure
- Length: 22.5 km (14.0 mi)

Major junctions
- West end: Highway 47 near Good Spirit Acres
- East end: Highway 9 near Gorlitz

Location
- Country: Canada
- Province: Saskatchewan
- Rural municipalities: Good Lake

Highway system
- Provincial highways in Saskatchewan
← Highway 225	→ Highway 240

Highway 229 is a provincial highway in the Canadian province of Saskatchewan. Saskatchewan's 200-series highways primarily service its recreational areas. It runs from Highway 47 to Good Spirit Lake Provincial Park and to Highway 9 and is about 23 kilometres (14 mi) long.

== Route description ==
Hwy 229 begins at a junction with roughly halfway between Springside and Buchanan, with the road heading due east for around 4.8 kilometres (3 mi), passing by the Good Spirit Woods Campground before curving northward to enter Good Spirit Acres. It travels past a golf course along the eastern edge of the hamlet before making a sharp right at the junction between Keewatin Avenue (leads north to Good Spirit Lake Provincial Park) and Capalano Drive (leads west into the centre of the hamlet). The highway now leaves Good Spirit Acres, heading due east past the Horseshoe Lake Wildlife Refuge (and the lake of the same name), where it has an intersection with Tiny Road (leads north to Burgis Beach and Tiny) before traveling through rural farmland for the next few kilometres. Hwy 229 now crosses a bridge over the Whitesand River, coming to an end shortly thereafter at an intersection with Hwy 9 (Saskota Flyway) just north of Gorlitz. The entire length of Hwy 229 is a paved, two-lane highway.

== Major intersections ==
From west to east:

Rural municipality	Location	km	mi	Destinations	Notes
Good Lake No. 274		0.0	0.0	Highway 47 – Buchanan, Springside	Western terminus; road continues west as northbound Hwy 47
Good Lake No. 274	Good Spirit Acres	6.4	4.0	Keewatin Avenue – Good Spirit Lake Provincial Park; Capalano Drive – Good Spirit Acres	
Good Lake No. 274		10.6	6.6	Tiny Road – Burgis Beach, Tiny	
Good Lake No. 274		20.9– 21.0	13.0– 13.0	Bridge over the Whitesand River	
Good Lake No. 274		22.5	14.0	Highway 9 (Saskota Flyway) – Canora, Yorkton	Eastern terminus
1.000 mi = 1.609 km; 1.000 km = 0.621 mi

== See also ==
- Transportation in Saskatchewan
- Roads in Saskatchewan
