= Invermay (disambiguation) =

Invermay is a settlement in Perth and Kinross, Scotland.

Invermay may also refer to:

- Invermay, Ontario, Canada
- Invermay, Saskatchewan, Canada
  - Rural Municipality of Invermay No. 305, Saskatchewan, Canada
- Invermay, Tasmania, Australia
  - Invermay FC, a sports team from Invermay, Tasmania
- Invermay, Victoria, Australia
- Invermay Park, Victoria, Australia
- Invermay Agricultural Centre, Otago, New Zealand
