= Theodore Reservoir =

Reservoir in Saskatchewan, Canada

- Location in Saskatchewan Theodore Reservoir (Canada)
- Location: RM of Insinger No. 275, RM of Good Lake No. 274, Saskatchewan
- Coordinates: 51.4571°N 102.8514°W
- Type: Reservoir
- Part of: Red River drainage basin
- Primary inflows: Whitesand River
- Primary outflows: Whitesand River
- Basin countries: Canada
- Managing agency: Saskatchewan Water Security Agency
- Built: 1964
- First flooded: 1964
- Surface area: 298.4 ha (737 acres)
- Max. depth: 9.2 m (30 ft)
- Water volume: 14,802 dam^{3} (12,000 acre⋅ft)
- Shore length^{1}: 24.9 km (15.5 mi)
- Surface elevation: 471 m (1,545 ft)
- Settlements: None
- ^{1} Shore length is not a well-defined measure.

Theodore Reservoir is a man-made reservoir along the course of the Whitesand River in the Canadian province of Saskatchewan. The lake was formed with the building of Theodore Dam in 1964. The reservoir and dam were named after the nearby community of Theodore. Whitesand River is the primary inflow and outflow for the reservoir. Lawrie Creek, which begins in the Beaver Hills, flows into the lake on the western side near the dam.

While there are no communities on the lake's shore, there is a regional park and a Bible camp on the western side. The lake is accessed from Highways 651 and 726 and nearby communities include Springside and Good Spirit Acres. Good Spirit Lake Provincial Park is 19 kilometres (12 mi) to the east.

== Theodore Dam ==
Theodore Dam (51.4426°N 102.8382°W) was built in 1964 along the course of the Whitesand River to create Theodore Reservoir. The dam is 14.6 metres (48 ft) high and the reservoir impounds 14,802 dam^{3} (12,000 acre⋅ft) of water. The outflow from the lake is at the southern end of the dam. In 2024, the Saskatchewan Water Security Agency began improvements to the dam that included the control gates being replaced and upgrades to the spillways.

Access to the dam is from Highway 726 and there is a boat launch at the northern end of the dam.

== Whitesand Regional Park ==
Whitesand Regional Park (51.4904°N 102.8944°W) is a regional park on the western shore of Theodore Reservoir. The park is accessed from Highway 651, which runs north from Theodore and the Yellowhead Highway.

The Whitesand Regional Park first opened on 4 May 1965. Since then, through regular expansion and investment, upgrades such as a picnic area, golf course, campground, boat launches, mini-golf, modern washroom and shower facilities, and a children's playground were added. The campground is made up of 30 electrified sites with access to potable water. Whitesand Regional Park Golf course is a sand greens, 9-hole course that originally opened in 1969.

== Fish species ==
Fish commonly found in the lake include northern pike, walleye, and perch. The lake is frequently stocked and was last stocked with 400,000 walleye fry in 2023.

== See also ==
- List of lakes of Saskatchewan
- Saskatchewan Water Security Agency
- Dams and reservoirs in Saskatchewan
- Tourism in Saskatchewan
- Whitesand Dam
