= Crescent Creek (Saskatchewan) =

River in Saskatchewan, Canada

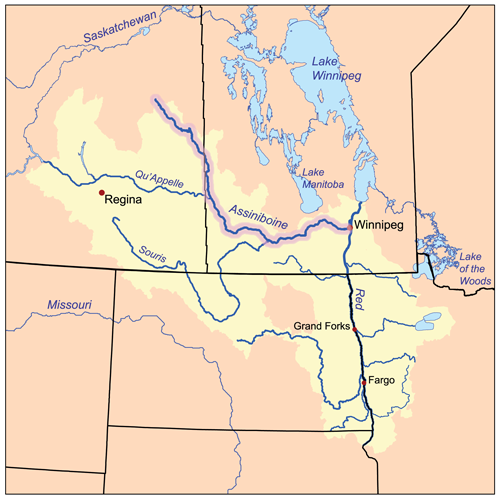
- Red River drainage basin, with the Assiniboine River highlighted

- Location of the mouth in Saskatchewan Crescent Creek (Saskatchewan) (Canada)

Location
- Country: Canada
- Provinces: Saskatchewan

Physical characteristics
- Source: Beaver Hills
  - location: RM of Garry No. 245
- Mouth: Crescent Lake
  - location: RM of Cana No. 214
  - coordinates: 51.0167°N 102.4671°W
  - elevation: 512 m (1,680 ft)

Basin features
- River system: Assiniboine River

Crescent Creek is a river in the south-east region of the Canadian province of Saskatchewan. The river begins in the Beaver Hills and flows in an easterly direction into Crescent Lake. Crescent Creek is a tributary of Yorkton Creek, which flows north into the Whitesand River–a tributary of the Assiniboine River.

Beginning in the RM of Garry No. 245, Crescent Creek flows south-east into the RM of Stanley No. 215 and on towards the city of Melville. North-west of the city, the river empties into Melville Reservoir. From there, Crescent Creek carries on eastward skirting the northern edge of Melville, running through the middle of Melville Golf and Country Club, and crossing Highways 47 and 10. After Melville, the river continues east into the RM of Cana No. 214 and Crescent Lake. Crescent Lake is a shallow lake that connects to Leech Lake, the source of Yorkton Creek.

== Melville Reservoir ==
Melville Reservoir (50.9516°N 102.8496°W), also known as Crescent Creek Reservoir, is a man-made lake along the course of Crescent Creek north-west of Melville. The dam was built in 1921 by the Canadian National Railway (CNR) to create a reservoir to supply water for its operations. The city of Melville bought the reservoir in 1958 and, in 1959, a water treatment plant was built to supply drinking water to the city. The water plant has undergone several upgrades since then. In 1977, a 4,546 m^{3} (160,500 cu ft) storage reservoir was added next to the treatment plant and in 1979 the reservoir was expanded to its current size. The total capacity of the reservoir is 4,406,000 m^{3} (155,600,000 cu ft), while the surface area is 148.1 hectares (366 acres), and the shoreline is 13 kilometres (8.1 mi) long.

At the southern end of the lake, on the north side of the dam, is a 2.1-kilometre (1.3 mi) loop hiking trail. Another hiking trail, 3.2 kilometres (2.0 mi) in length, goes from the lake to Melville along the north side of Crescent Creek.

== See also ==
- List of rivers of Saskatchewan
- List of lakes of Saskatchewan
- Hudson Bay drainage basin
