= Rural Municipality of Invermay No. 305 =

Rural municipality in Saskatchewan, Canada

Invermay No. 305
- Rural municipality
- Rural Municipality of Invermay No. 305
- Location of the RM of Invermay No. 305 in Saskatchewan
- Coordinates: 51.761°N 103.066°W
- Country: Canada
- Province: Saskatchewan
- Census division: 9
- SARM division: 4
- Formed: December 11, 1911

Government
  - Reeve: Bev Whyatt
  - Governing body: RM of Invermay No. 305 Council
  - Administrator: Dana Jack
  - Office location: Invermay

Area (2016)
  - Land: 729.44 km^{2} (281.64 sq mi)

Population (2016)
  - Total: 325
  - Density: 0.4/km^{2} (1.0/sq mi)
- Time zone: CST
  - Summer (DST): CST
- Area codes: 306 and 639

The Rural Municipality of Invermay No. 305 (2016 population: 325) is a rural municipality (RM) in the Canadian province of Saskatchewan within Census Division No. 9 and SARM Division No. 4.

== History ==
The RM of Invermay No. 305 incorporated as a rural municipality on December 11, 1911.

== Geography ==
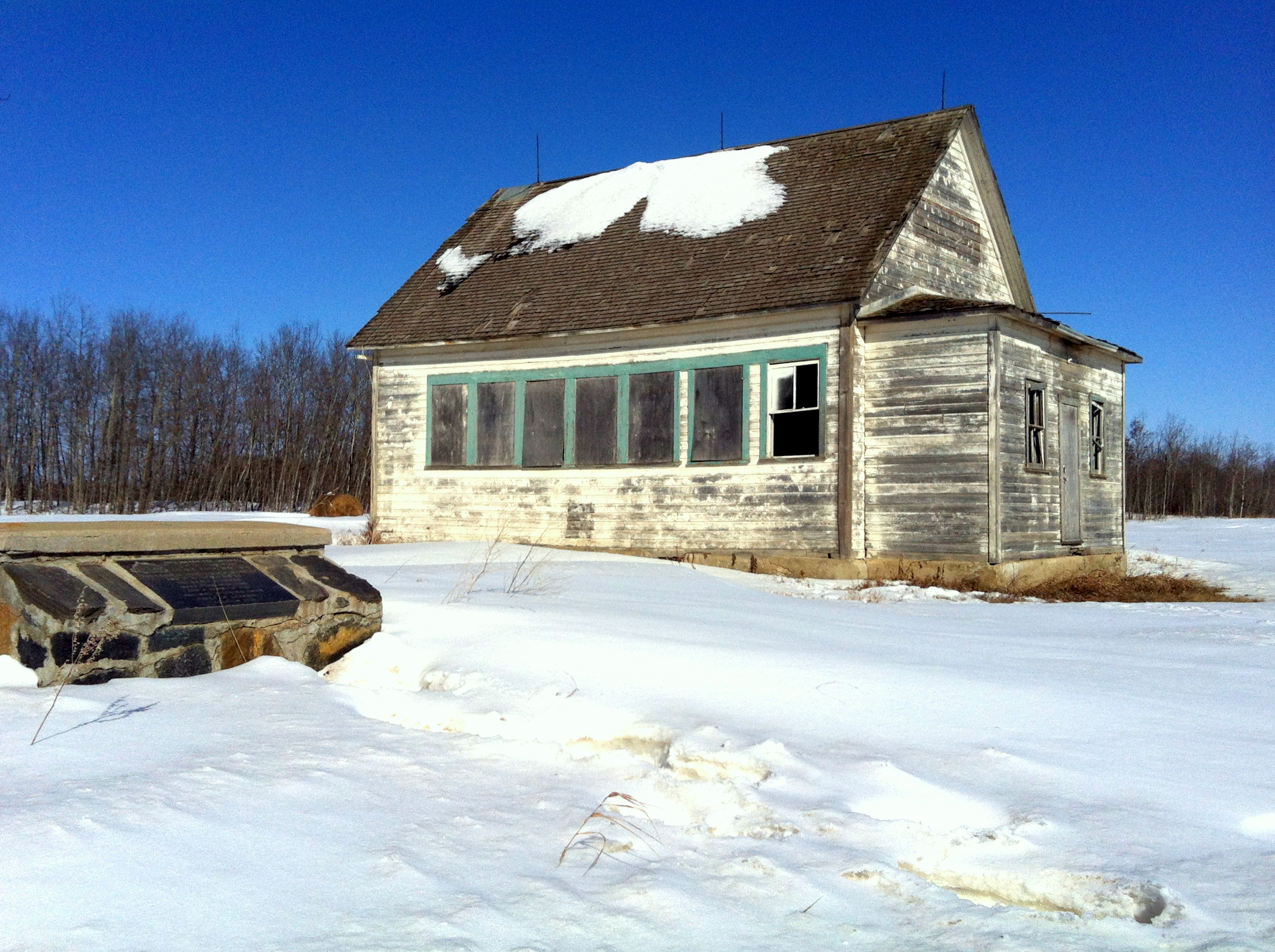
Dobrowody School house.

=== Communities and localities ===
The following urban municipalities are surrounded by the RM.

Villages

- Invermay
- Rama

The following unincorporated communities are within the RM.

Localities

- Dobrowody
- Dernic
- Netherton
- Lone Spruce
- Mitchellview

=== Waterbodies ===
The following are notable waterbodies in the RM.

- Whitesand River
- Newburn Lake
- Spirit Creek

== Demographics ==
Population history (1981–2016)
| Year | Pop. | ±% |
|---|---|---|
| 1981 | 713 | — |
| 1986 | 677 | −5.0% |
| 1991 | 611 | −9.7% |
| 1996 | 514 | −15.9% |
| 2001 | 422 | −17.9% |
| 2006 | 379 | −10.2% |
| 2011 | 334 | −11.9% |
| 2016 | 325 | −2.7% |
Source: Statistics Canada via Saskatchewan Bureau of Statistics

In the 2021 Census of Population conducted by Statistics Canada, the RM of Invermay No. 305 had a population of 269 living in 110 of its 133 total private dwellings, a change of −17.2% from its 2016 population of 325. With a land area of 694.14 km^{2} (268.01 sq mi), it had a population density of 0.4/km^{2} (1.0/sq mi) in 2021.

In the 2016 Census of Population, the RM of Invermay No. 305 recorded a population of 325 living in 129 of its 156 total private dwellings, a −2.7% change from its 2011 population of 334. With a land area of 729.44 km^{2} (281.64 sq mi), it had a population density of 0.4/km^{2} (1.2/sq mi) in 2016.

== Attractions ==
- Grotto of our Lady of Lourdes in Rama
- The Invermay Fair

== Government ==
The RM of Invermay No. 305 is governed by an elected municipal council and an appointed administrator that meets on the second Wednesday of every month. The reeve of the RM is Bev Whyatt while its administrator is Dana Jack. The RM's office is located in Invermay.

== Transportation ==
- Saskatchewan Highway 5
- Saskatchewan Highway 617
- Saskatchewan Highway 754
- Canadian National Railway

== See also ==
- List of rural municipalities in Saskatchewan
