= Burgis Beach =

Hamlet in Saskatchewan, Canada

- Hamlet
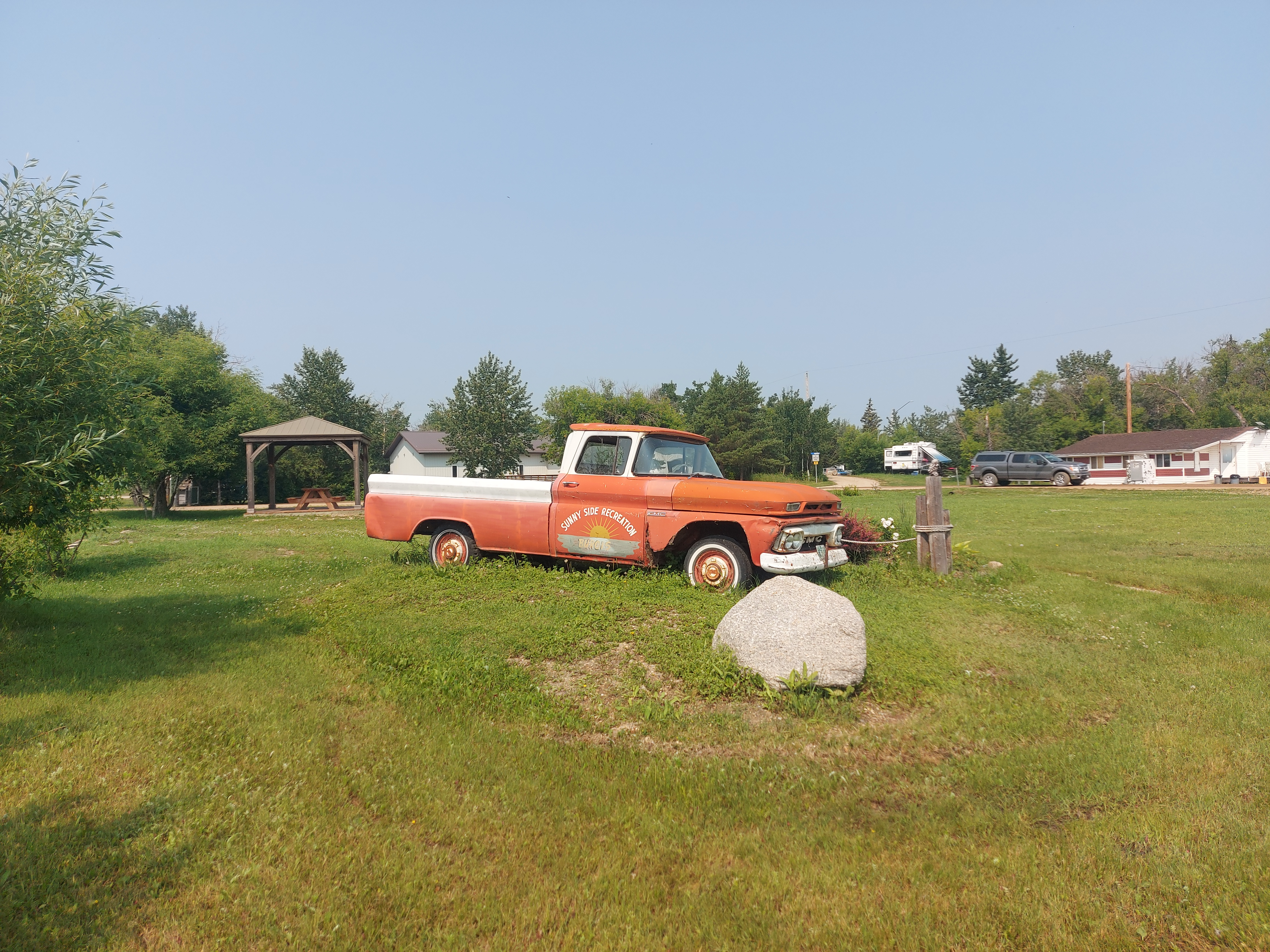
- Burgis Beach

- Location in Saskatchewan Burgis Beach (Canada)
- Coordinates: 51°32′41″N 102°37′23″W
- Country: Canada
- Province: Saskatchewan
- Census division: 9
- Rural municipality: Good Lake No. 274
- Waterway(s): Good Spirit Lake
- Website: Burgis Beach

Burgis Beach is a hamlet in the Canadian province of Saskatchewan. Access is from Tiny Road, which is a grid road that runs from Highway 5 at Tiny south to Highway 229.

== Geography ==
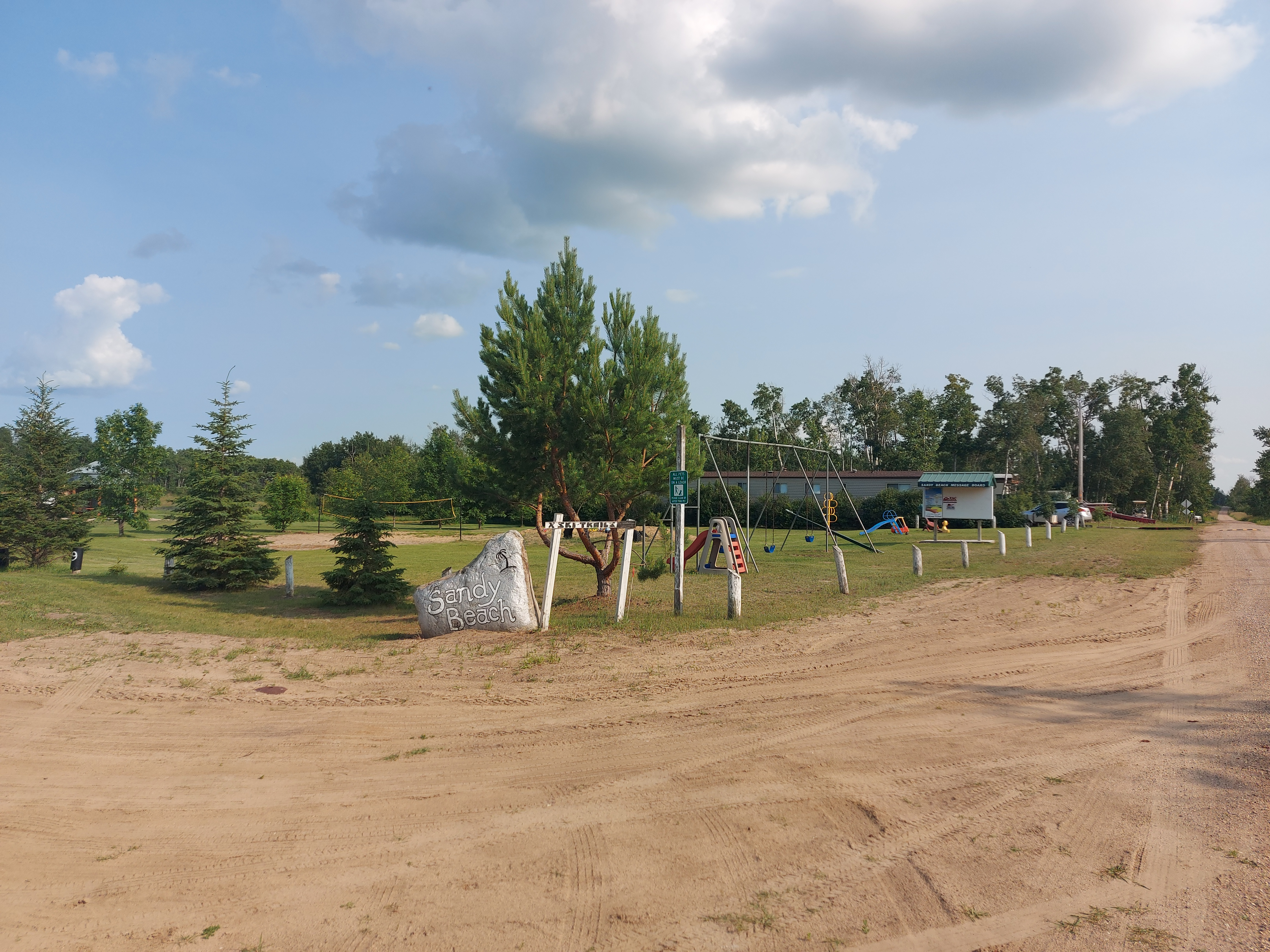
Sandy Beach Resort

The community is on the eastern shore of Good Spirit Lake in the RM of Good Lake No. 274. The resorts of Sandy Beach and Parkland Resort are adjacent to the hamlet and the eastern boundary of Good Spirit Lake Provincial Park is to the south.

== Demographics ==
In the 2021 Census of Population conducted by Statistics Canada, Burgis Beach had a population of 113 living in 50 of its 169 total private dwellings, a change of 105.5% from its 2016 population of 55. With a land area of 0.36 km^{2} (0.14 sq mi), it had a population density of 313.9/km^{2} (813.0/sq mi) in 2021.

== See also ==
- List of communities in Saskatchewan
- List of hamlets in Saskatchewan
