= York Lake =

Lake in Saskatchewan, Canada

- Pebble Lake
- Location in Saskatchewan York Lake (Canada)
- Location: RM of Orkney No. 244, Saskatchewan
- Coordinates: 51.1558°N 102.4785°W
- Part of: Red River drainage basin
- Primary inflows: Willow Brook
- Basin countries: Canada
- Surface area: 316 ha (780 acres)
- Max. depth: 4.3 m (14 ft)
- Shore length^{1}: 20.5 km (12.7 mi)
- Surface elevation: 509 m (1,670 ft)
- ^{1} Shore length is not a well-defined measure.

York Lake, formerly known as Pebble Lake, is a lake in the south-east region of the Canadian province of Saskatchewan. It is a shallow, narrow lake located about 5 kilometres (3.1 mi) south of the city of Yorkton in the Prairie Pothole Region of North America, which extends throughout three Canadian provinces and five U.S. states, and within Palliser's Triangle and the Great Plains ecoregion of Canada.

The primary inflow for York Lake is from Willow Brook, which begins in the RM of Garry No. 245 in the Beaver Hills. Willow Brook travels in an easterly direction from the hills into Rousay Lake, which is connected to York Lake at its northern end. At the southern end of York Lake, the lake's outflow leaves the lake and heads in a north-east to Yorkton Creek, south of Yorkton.

York Lake Golf & Country Club is at the northern end of the lake and Yorkton Lake Regional Park and Maple Grove Estates are on the eastern shore.

== York Lake Regional Park ==
Since the turn of the 20th century, the lake has been used for recreational purposes by the settlers of the region. The original park on the lake was sponsored by the city of Yorkton and the local Kinsman Club. In 1969, it became a regional park of Saskatchewan.

York Lake Regional Park (51.1652°N 102.4889°W) has a campground, beach access, a golf course, baseball diamonds, trap and skeet shooting, 3D archery, indoor gun range, playground, concession, a nature trail, and Yorkton Navy League. The campground has 31 electrified daily campsites as well as 32 seasonal sites. The hiking trail is a self-guided trail that runs along the eastern shore of the lake and is about 3 kilometres (1.9 mi) long.

The golf course, originally known as Yorkton Country Club, was established in 1926. In 1943, it became known as South Wood Golf Club and in 1964, the current name, York Lake Golf & Country Club, was established. It was originally an 18-hole, sand green course, but due to multiple floods beginning in 2010, the back-nine became unplayable. In 2019, three of the nine flooded holes were restored creating a 12-hole golf course. The golf course, located at the northern end of York Lake, is about five kilometres north of the entrance gate to York Lake Regional Park.

== See also ==
- List of lakes of Saskatchewan
- List of protected areas of Saskatchewan
- Tourism in Saskatchewan
