= Good Spirit Lake =

Lake in Saskatchewan, Canada

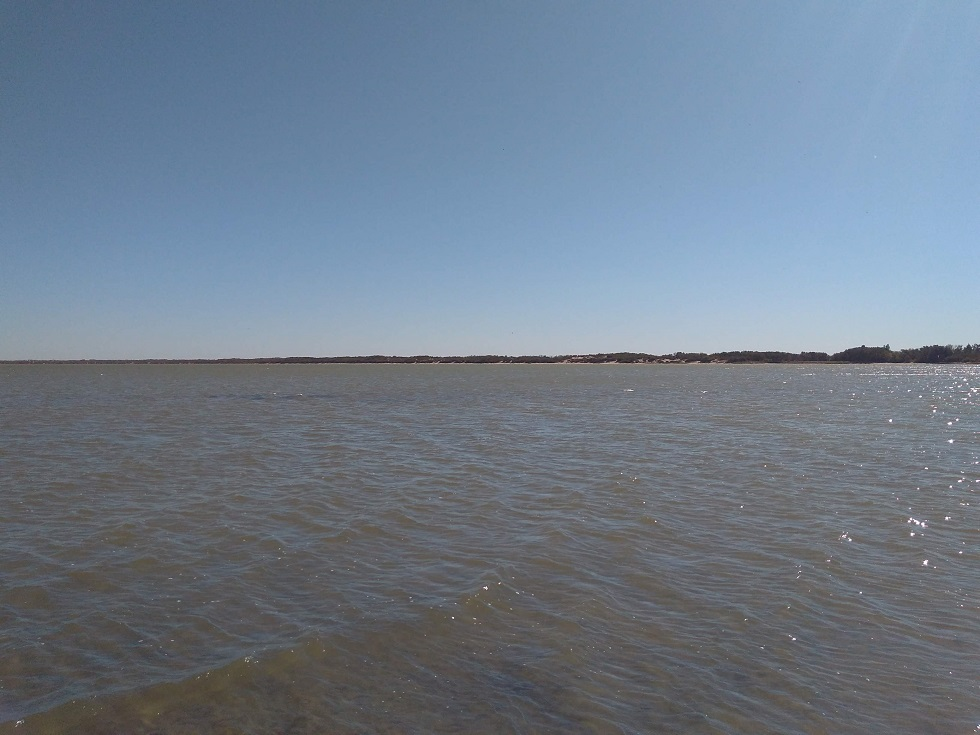
- Good Spirit Lake

- Location in Saskatchewan Good Spirit Lake (Canada)
- Location: RM of Good Lake No. 274, Saskatchewan
- Coordinates: 51.5667°N 102.6671°W
- Part of: Red River drainage basin
- Primary inflows: Spirit Creek
- Basin countries: Canada
- Surface area: 4,501 ha (11,120 acres)
- Max. depth: 10 m (33 ft)
- Shore length^{1}: 40 km (25 mi)
- Surface elevation: 482 m (1,581 ft)
- Settlements: Canora Beach; Burgis Beach
- ^{1} Shore length is not a well-defined measure.

Good Spirit Lake is a lake on the eastern side of the Canadian province of Saskatchewan. It is a shallow lake notable for its natural sand beaches, parks, and sand dunes. One of Saskatchewan's six founding provincial parks, Good Spirit Lake Provincial Park, surrounds the western and southern shores of the lake. The lake is in the RM of Good Lake No. 274 and Yorkton, 48 kilometres (30 mi) to the south, is the nearest city. The hamlets of Burgis Beach and Canora Beach — the only two communities on the lake — are located on the eastern shore. The southern shore of the lake is accessed from Highway 229 and the northern shore is accessed from Highway 746. Highway 47 runs north to south west of the lake and Good Spirit Lake Provincial Park.

Good Spirit Lake's main inflow, Spirit Creek, flows into the lake at the northern end. At the southern end of the lake is a dam that was built to regulate water levels. The lake's outflow is from a channel that leads away from the dam and into a tributary of the Whitesand River.

== History ==
In the winter of 1774–75, Matthew Cocking of the Hudson's Bay Company stayed at the lake and called it "Witch Lake". In the late 1800s, the local postmaster Robert Russell Smith named it "Devil's Lake" as the naming was a misinterpretation of the Cree / Salteaux word "manitow", which actually means "good spirit". The European settlers of the time could not believe a spirit could be "good" so the term "Devil" was used. The local post office continued to use the name Devil's Lake until it closed in 1954.

Near the end of the last ice age, a river ran through the area now occupied by the lake. The river had deposited the sands that make up the lake's sandy shores and bottom and the dunes at the southern end of the lake. The dunes, which reach a height of up to five storeys, are within Good Spirit Provincial Park and there are interpretive hiking trails that traverse them.

== Parks and recreation ==
Good Spirit Lake Provincial Park is located along the lake's entire western and southern shores and it has three campgrounds with over 200 sites, a beach, picnic area, boat launch, and hiking trails. A section of the Trans Canada Trail winds its way around the park and the Dune Discovery Interpretive Trail goes through sand dunes. In the winter season, many of the trails are groomed for cross-country skiing and snowmobiling.

Other parks, campgrounds, and resorts on Good Spirit Lake include:

- Mistik Resort cabin rentals
- Good Spirit Bible Camp
- Donald Gunn Subdivision
- Sandy Beach
- Parkland Resort
- Canora Beach Resort
- Bella Sands Resort
- Good Spirit Petting Zoo

== Fish species ==
Fish commonly found in the lake include northern pike, perch, and walleye.

== Gallery ==
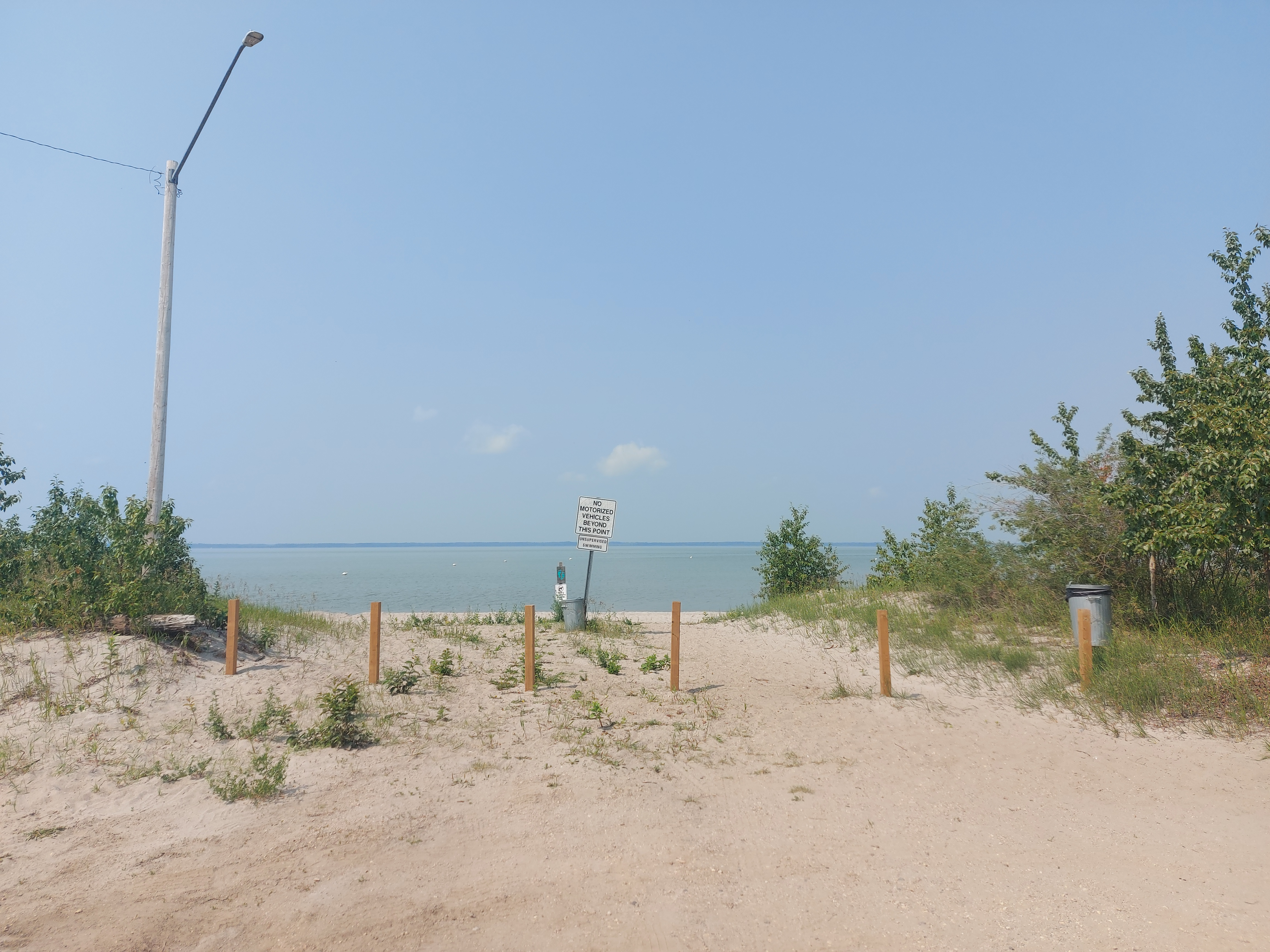
Burgis Beach

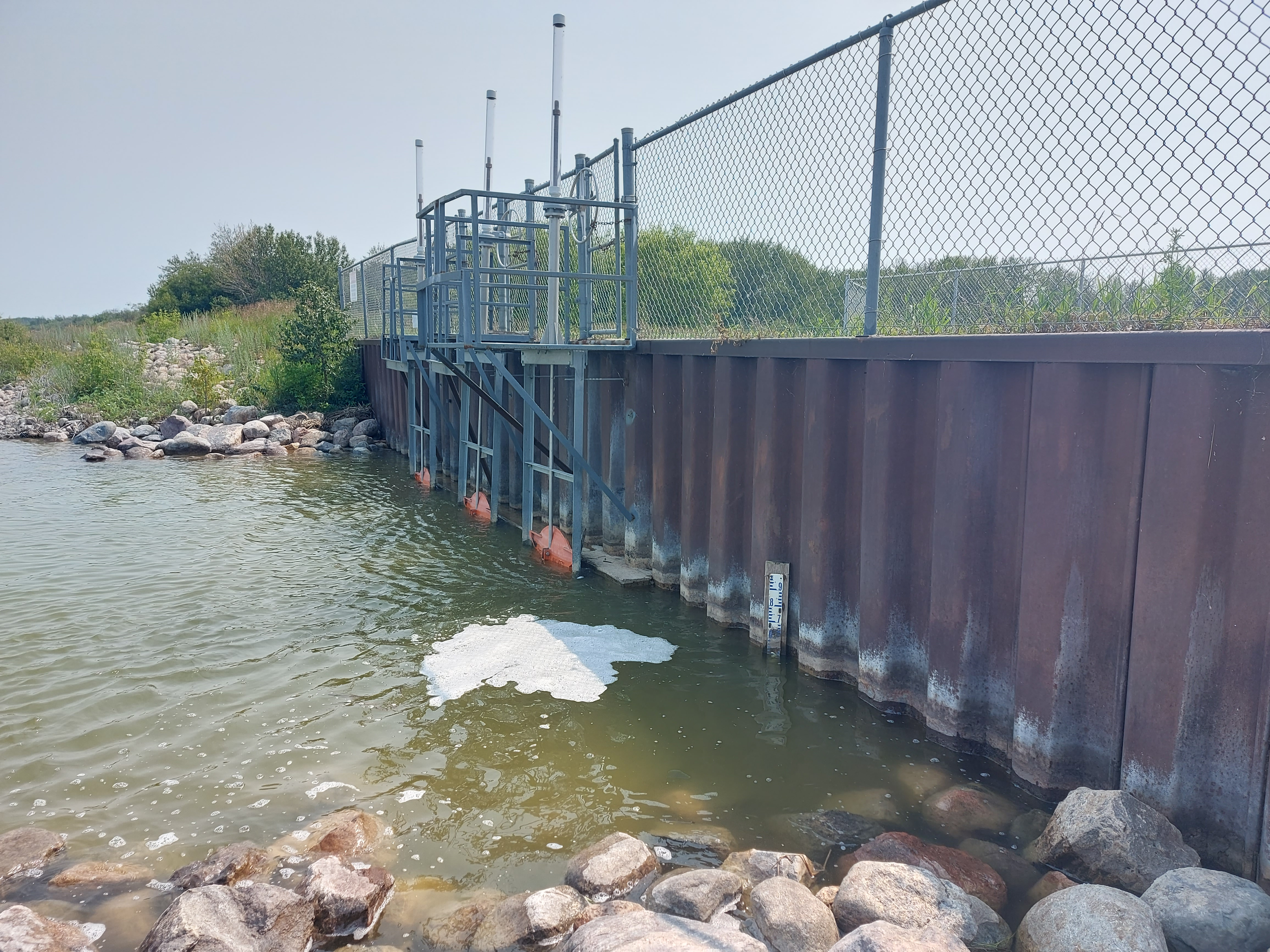
Dam at Good Spirit Lake's outflow

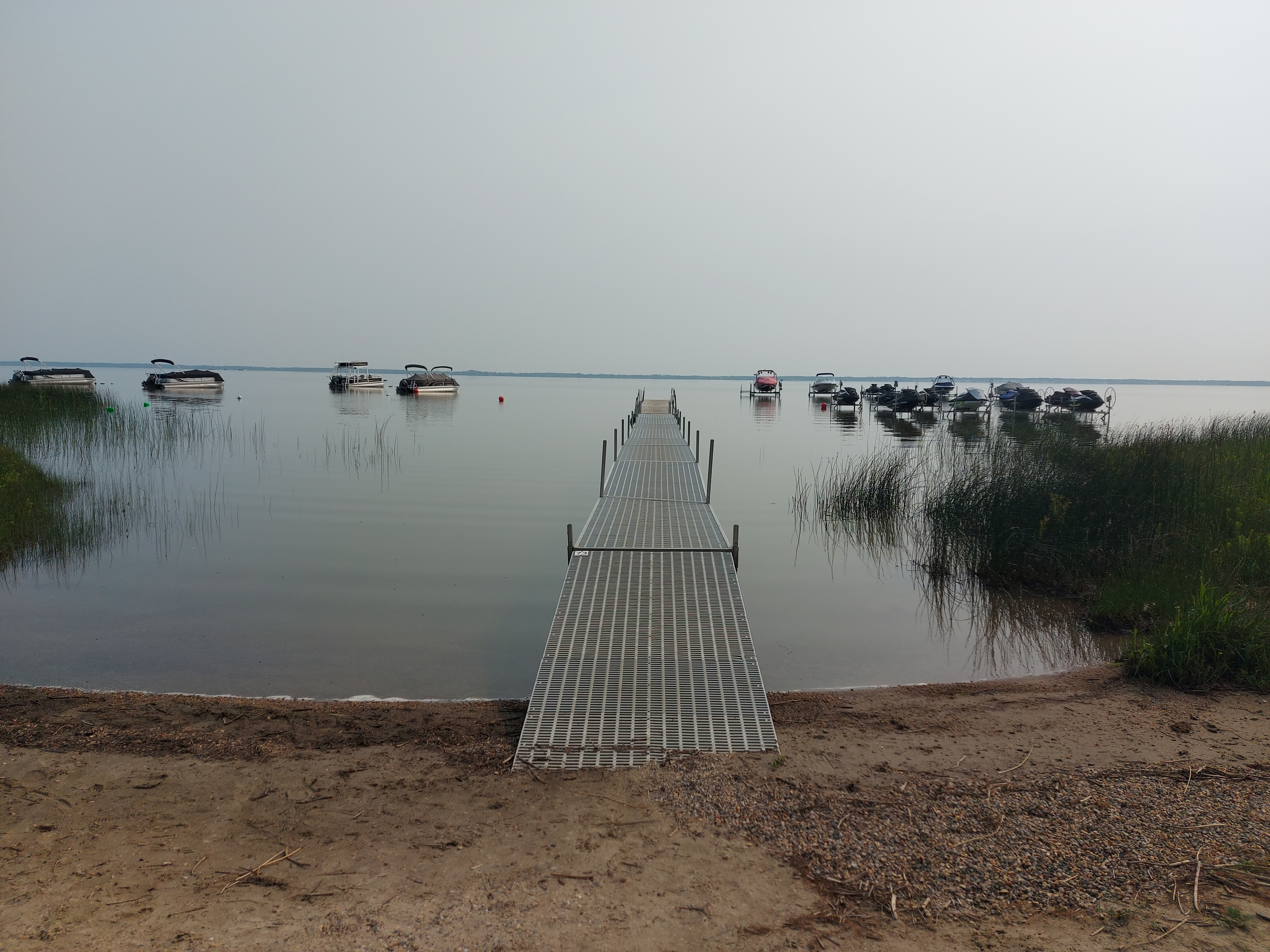
The boat launch at Donald Gunn Subdivision

== See also ==
- List of lakes of Saskatchewan
- List of protected areas of Saskatchewan
- Tourism in Saskatchewan
- Good Spirit Acres
