= Spirit Creek =

River in Saskatchewan, Canada

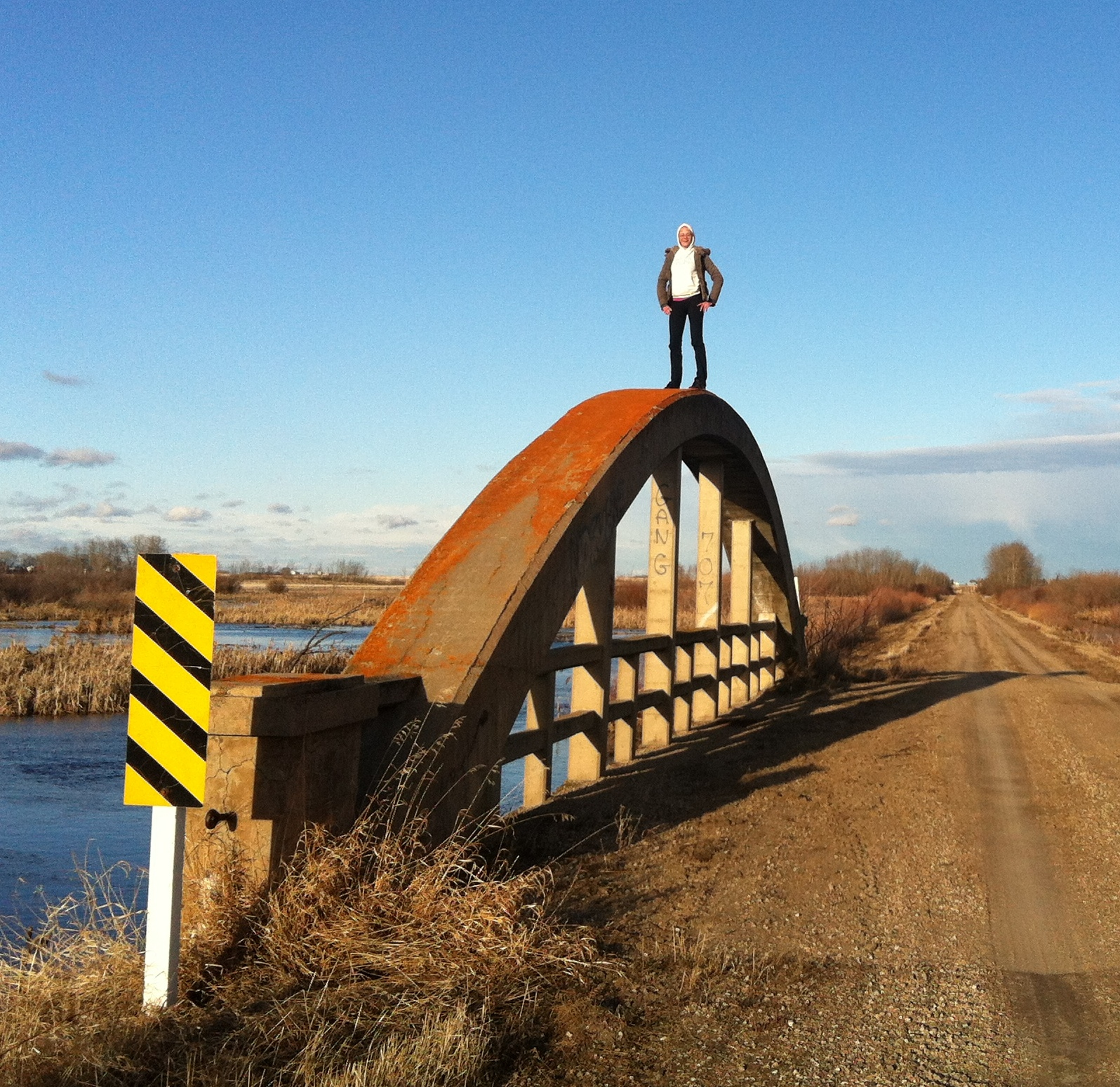
- Highway 754 crossing over Spirit Creek

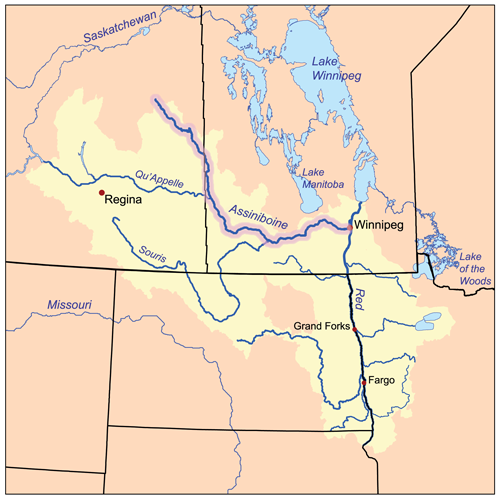
- Assiniboine River

- Location of the mouth in Saskatchewan Spirit Creek (Canada)

Location
- Country: Canada
- Provinces: Saskatchewan

Physical characteristics
- Source
  - coordinates: 51.7947°N 102.8987°W
- Mouth: Good Spirit Lake
  - coordinates: 51.6071°N 102.6973°W
  - elevation: 481 m (1,578 ft)

Basin features
- River system: Assiniboine River drainage basin

Spirit Creek is a river located in the Assiniboine River watershed in the Canadian province of Saskatchewan. It begins east of Rama and flows south-east into the north end of Good Spirit Lake. Along its route, it crosses Highway 5 and the CN Railway 3 kilometres (2 mi) west of Buchanan. Just over 3 kilometres (2 mi) south of Buchanan, it crosses Highway 47 and flows into Patterson Lake. From Patterson Lake, it empties into the north end of Good Spirit Lake.

Near the mouth of the river is Bella Sands Resort, Good Spirit Petting Zoo, and the northernmost point of Good Spirit Lake Provincial Park. At the south end of Good Spirit Lake, there's a dam and an outflow channel. That channel flows eastward into a tributary of Whitesand River. Whitesand River continues eastward and meets up with the Assiniboine River.

Spirit Creek Reservoir is 3 kilometres (2 mi) east of Rama along a tributary of Spirit Creek. The dam and reservoir were built in the 1920s by Canadian Northern Railway to provide steam locomotives with a water source. Later, it was owned and operated by the village of Rama. Most recently, Big Sky Farms owned the dam.

== See also ==
- List of rivers of Saskatchewan
- Hudson Bay drainage basin
