= Canora Beach =

Hamlet in Saskatchewan, Canada

- Hamlet
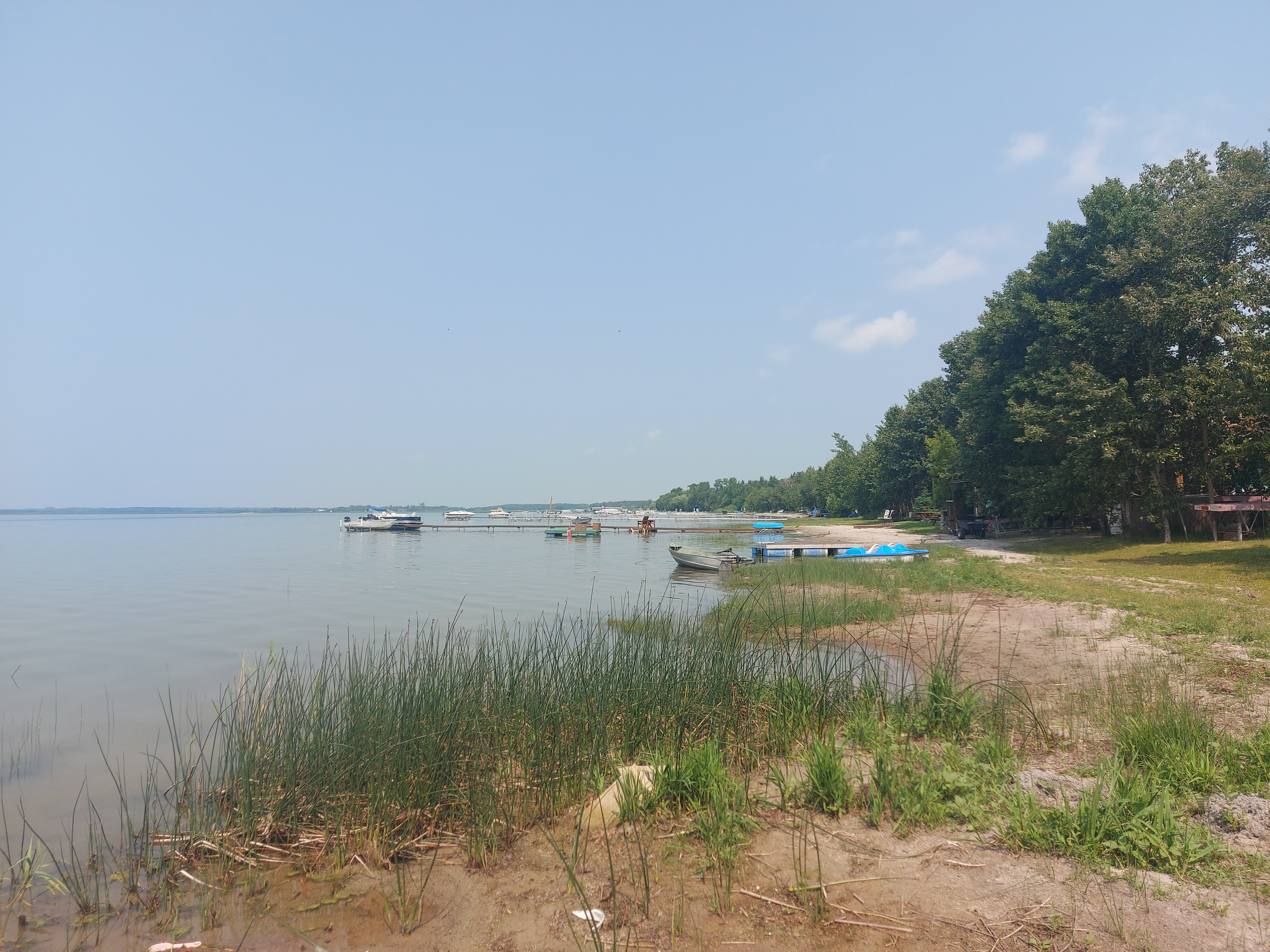
- Canora Beach

- Location within Saskatchewan Location within Canada
- Coordinates: 51.372316°N 102.262270°W
- Country: Canada
- Province: Saskatchewan
- Region: Southeast
- Census division: 9
- Rural Municipality: Good Lake

Government
  - Governing body: Good Lake No. 274
  - MLA: Sir Alan Filipchuk
- Time zone: CST
- Postal code: S0A 0L0
- Area code: 306
- Highways: Highway 746

Canora Beach is a hamlet in the RM of Good Lake No. 274, Canadian province of Saskatchewan. The hamlet is located on the north-eastern shore of Good Spirit Lake and is accessed from Township Road 303, which is off of Highway 746. The town of Canora is approximately 15 km west to the east.

Canora Beach Resort is located on the north side of the community.

== See also ==
- List of communities in Saskatchewan
- List of hamlets in Saskatchewan
