= Barry Nieckar =

Canadian ice hockey player

- Born: December 16, 1967 (age 58) Rama, Saskatchewan, Canada
- Height: 6 ft 3 in (191 cm)
- Weight: 200 lb (91 kg; 14 st 4 lb)
- Position: Left wing
- Shot: Left
- Played for: Hartford Whalers; Calgary Flames; Mighty Ducks of Anaheim
- NHL draft: Undrafted
- Playing career: 1992–2003

Barry Glenn Nieckar (born December 16, 1967) is a Canadian former professional ice hockey player who played eight games in the National Hockey League for the Hartford Whalers, Calgary Flames and Mighty Ducks of Anaheim between 1992 and 1998. He did not record a point, but tallied 21 penalty minutes.

An undrafted player, Nieckar spent ten seasons toiling in the minor leagues before heading over to England in 1999 to play four seasons in the Ice Hockey Superleague for the London Knights and Nottingham Panthers. He retired following the 2002–03 season.

== Career statistics ==
=== Regular season and playoffs ===
			Regular season					Playoffs
Season	Team	League	GP	G	A	Pts	PIM	GP	G	A	Pts	PIM
1986–87	Weyburn Red Wings	SJHL	41	12	10	22	115	—	—	—	—	—
1987–88	Yorkton Terriers	SJHL	57	27	32	59	188	16	11	6	17	65
1989–90	Virginia Lancers	ECHL	5	2	2	4	27	—	—	—	—	—
1991–92	Phoenix Roadrunners	IHL	5	0	0	0	9	—	—	—	—	—
1991–92	Raleigh IceCaps	ECHL	46	10	18	28	229	4	4	0	4	22
1992–93	Hartford Whalers	NHL	2	0	0	0	2	—	—	—	—	—
1992–93	Springfield Indians	AHL	21	2	4	6	65	6	1	0	1	14
1993–94	Springfield Indians	AHL	30	0	2	2	67	—	—	—	—	—
1993–94	Raleigh IceCaps	ECHL	18	4	6	10	126	15	5	7	12	51
1994–95	Calgary Flames	NHL	3	0	0	0	12	—	—	—	—	—
1994–95	Saint John Flames	AHL	65	8	7	15	491	4	0	0	0	22
1995–96	Utah Grizzlies	IHL	53	9	15	24	194	—	—	—	—	—
1995–96	Peoria Rivermen	IHL	10	3	3	6	72	12	4	6	10	48
1996–97	Mighty Ducks of Anaheim	NHL	2	0	0	0	5	—	—	—	—	—
1996–97	Long Beach Ice Dogs	IHL	63	3	10	13	386	5	0	0	0	22
1997–98	Mighty Ducks of Anaheim	NHL	1	0	0	0	2	—	—	—	—	—
1997–98	Cincinnati Mighty Ducks	AHL	75	10	14	24	295	—	—	—	—	—
1998–99	Springfield Falcons	AHL	67	11	6	17	270	1	0	0	0	2
1999–00	London Knights	BISL	18	2	0	2	143	8	2	2	4	10
2000–01	Nottingham Panthers	BISL	41	3	10	13	253	5	0	1	1	12
2001–02	Nottingham Panthers	BISL	45	5	6	11	222	6	0	0	0	2
2002–03	Nottingham Panthers	BISL	20	3	4	7	150	15	4	8	12	32
AHL totals			258	31	33	64	1188	11	1	0	1	38
NHL totals			8	0	0	0	21	—	—	—	—	—
