= Good Spirit Acres =

Hamlet in Saskatchewan, Canada

- Hamlet
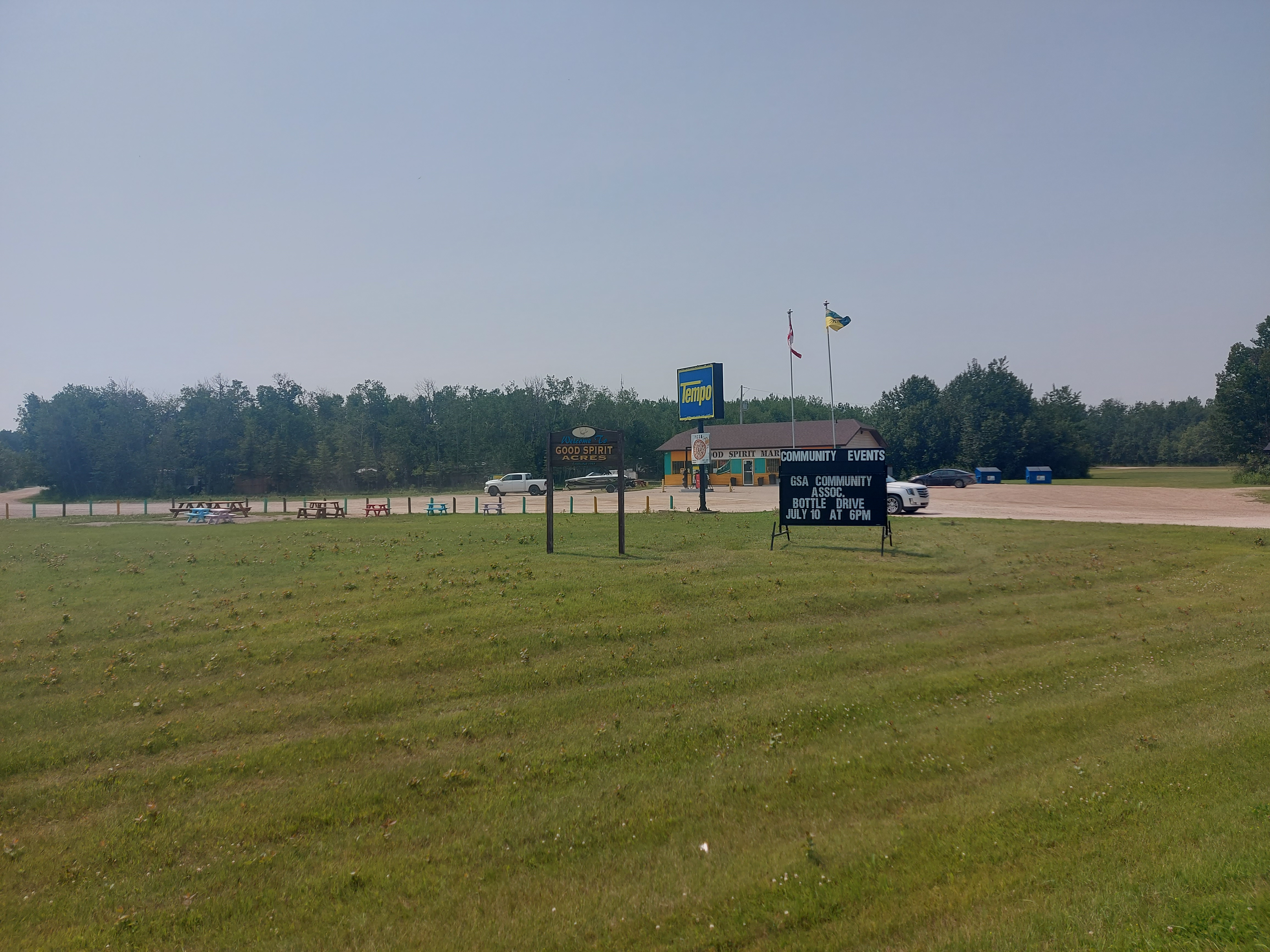
- Good Spirit Acres

- Location in Saskatchewan Good Spirit Acres (Canada)
- Coordinates: 51°29′11″N 102°40′45″W
- Country: Canada
- Province: Saskatchewan
- Census division: 9
- Rural municipality: Good Lake No. 274
- Highway(s): 229
- Waterway(s): Good Spirit Lake

Good Spirit Acres is a hamlet in the Canadian province of Saskatchewan. It is about 2 kilometres (1.2 mi) south of Good Spirit Lake and Good Spirit Lake Provincial Park in the RM of Good Lake No. 274. Access is from Highway 229.

== Demographics ==
In the 2021 Census of Population conducted by Statistics Canada, Good Spirit Acres had a population of 138 living in 74 of its 126 total private dwellings, a change of 3.8% from its 2016 population of 133. With a land area of 1.34 km^{2} (0.52 sq mi), it had a population density of 103.0/km^{2} (266.7/sq mi) in 2021.

== Climate ==
Climate data for Good Spirit Acres
| Month | Jan | Feb | Mar | Apr | May | Jun | Jul | Aug | Sep | Oct | Nov | Dec | Year |
|---|---|---|---|---|---|---|---|---|---|---|---|---|---|
| Record high °C (°F) | 9 (48) | 12 (54) | 20.5 (68.9) | 30.5 (86.9) | 36.5 (97.7) | 35 (95) | 37.2 (99.0) | 37.8 (100.0) | 34.4 (93.9) | 30.5 (86.9) | 21.1 (70.0) | 11 (52) | 37.8 (100.0) |
| Mean daily maximum °C (°F) | −12.2 (10.0) | −8.1 (17.4) | −1.7 (28.9) | 8.6 (47.5) | 17.4 (63.3) | 21.6 (70.9) | 23.9 (75.0) | 23.4 (74.1) | 17 (63) | 9.9 (49.8) | −2.2 (28.0) | −10.3 (13.5) | 7.3 (45.1) |
| Daily mean °C (°F) | −17.9 (−0.2) | −13.7 (7.3) | −7.2 (19.0) | 2.6 (36.7) | 10.8 (51.4) | 15.4 (59.7) | 17.6 (63.7) | 16.6 (61.9) | 10.7 (51.3) | 4.2 (39.6) | −6.6 (20.1) | −15.4 (4.3) | 1.4 (34.5) |
| Mean daily minimum °C (°F) | −23.5 (−10.3) | −19.3 (−2.7) | −12.7 (9.1) | −3.4 (25.9) | 4.2 (39.6) | 9 (48) | 11.3 (52.3) | 9.7 (49.5) | 4.4 (39.9) | −1.5 (29.3) | −11 (12) | −20.5 (−4.9) | −4.4 (24.1) |
| Record low °C (°F) | −48.3 (−54.9) | −46.7 (−52.1) | −41.1 (−42.0) | −33.9 (−29.0) | −11.5 (11.3) | −3.3 (26.1) | −1.7 (28.9) | −4.4 (24.1) | −12.2 (10.0) | −22 (−8) | −38.5 (−37.3) | −46.1 (−51.0) | −48.3 (−54.9) |
| Average precipitation mm (inches) | 19.3 (0.76) | 16.7 (0.66) | 28.6 (1.13) | 25.3 (1.00) | 50.6 (1.99) | 85.8 (3.38) | 73.1 (2.88) | 59 (2.3) | 52.9 (2.08) | 25.3 (1.00) | 19.8 (0.78) | 24 (0.9) | 480.5 (18.92) |

== See also ==
- List of communities in Saskatchewan
- List of hamlets in Saskatchewan
- List of golf courses in Saskatchewan
