= Rural Municipality of Good Lake No. 274 =

Rural municipality in Saskatchewan, Canada

Good Lake No. 274
- Rural municipality
- Rural Municipality of Good Lake No. 274
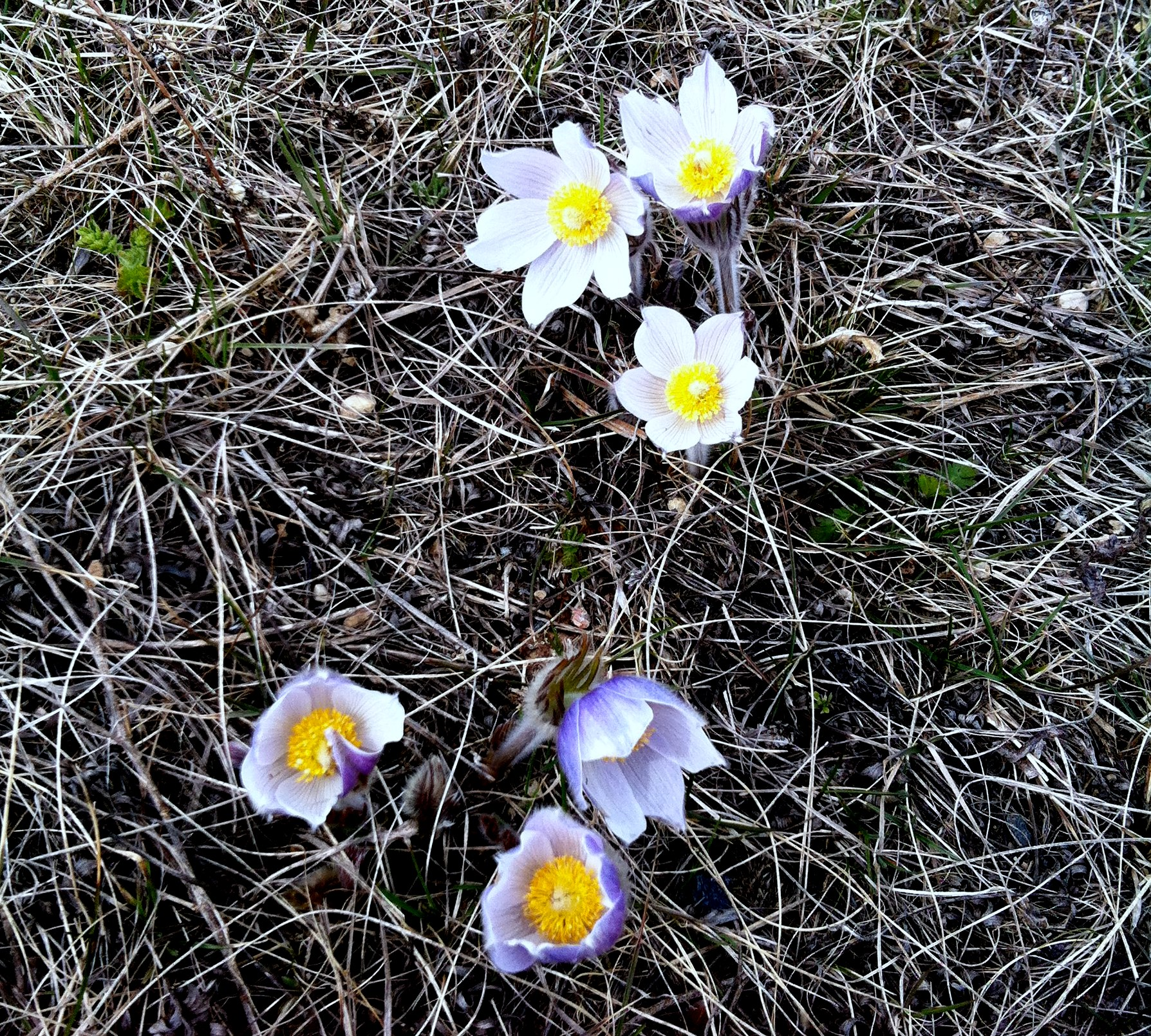
- Spring crocuses in the RM of Good Lake

- Location of the RM of Good Lake No. 274 in Saskatchewan
- Coordinates: 51.546°N 102.656°W
- Country: Canada
- Province: Saskatchewan
- Census division: 9
- SARM division: 4
- Formed: January 1, 1913

Government
  - Reeve: David Popowich
  - Governing body: RM of Good Lake No. 274 Council
  - Administrator: Diane Jamieson
  - Office location: Canora

Area (2016)
  - Land: 809.94 km^{2} (312.72 sq mi)

Population (2016)
  - Total: 747
  - Density: 0.9/km^{2} (2.3/sq mi)
- Time zone: CST
  - Summer (DST): CST
- Area codes: 306 and 639
- Website: Official website

The Rural Municipality of Good Lake No. 274 (2016 population: 747) is a rural municipality (RM) in the Canadian province of Saskatchewan within Census Division No. 9 and SARM Division No. 4.

== History ==
The RM of Good Lake No. 274 incorporated as a rural municipality on January 1, 1913.

== Geography ==
=== Communities and localities ===
The following urban municipalities are surrounded by the RM.

Towns

- Canora

The following unincorporated communities are within the RM.

Organized hamlets

- Burgis Beach
- Good Spirit Acres

Localities

- Burgis
- Canora Beach
- Donald Gunn
- Drobot
- Gorlitz
- Kitchimanitou Beach
- Whitesand

== Demographics ==
Population history (1981–2016)
Year	Pop.	±%
1981	839	—
1986	788	−6.1%
1991	733	−7.0%
1996	722	−1.5%
2001	693	−4.0%
2006	748	+7.9%
2011	684	−8.6%
2016	747	+9.2%
Source: Statistics Canada via Saskatchewan Bureau of Statistics

In the 2021 Census of Population conducted by Statistics Canada, the RM of Good Lake No. 274 had a population of 930 living in 423 of its 924 total private dwellings, a change of 24.5% from its 2016 population of 747. With a land area of 773.54 km^{2} (298.67 sq mi), it had a population density of 1.2/km^{2} (3.1/sq mi) in 2021.

In the 2016 Census of Population, the RM of Good Lake No. 274 recorded a population of 747 living in 332 of its 866 total private dwellings, a 9.2% change from its 2011 population of 684. With a land area of 809.94 km^{2} (312.72 sq mi), it had a population density of 0.9/km^{2} (2.4/sq mi) in 2016.

== Attractions ==
- Canora Station House Museum
- Good Spirit Lake Provincial Park
- Horseshoe Lake Wildlife Refuge
- Whitesand Regional Park
- Whitesand River Recreation Site

== Government ==
The RM of Good Lake No. 274 is governed by an elected municipal council and an appointed administrator that meets on the second Monday of every month. The reeve of the RM is David Popowich while its administrator is Diane Jamieson. The RM's office is located in Canora.

== Transportation ==
- Highway 5
- Highway 9
- Highway 4
- Highway 229
- Highway 651
- Highway 726
- Highway 746
- Canadian National Railway
- Canora station
- Canora Airport

== See also ==
- List of rural municipalities in Saskatchewan
