= Whitesand River (Saskatchewan) =

River in Saskatchewan, Canada

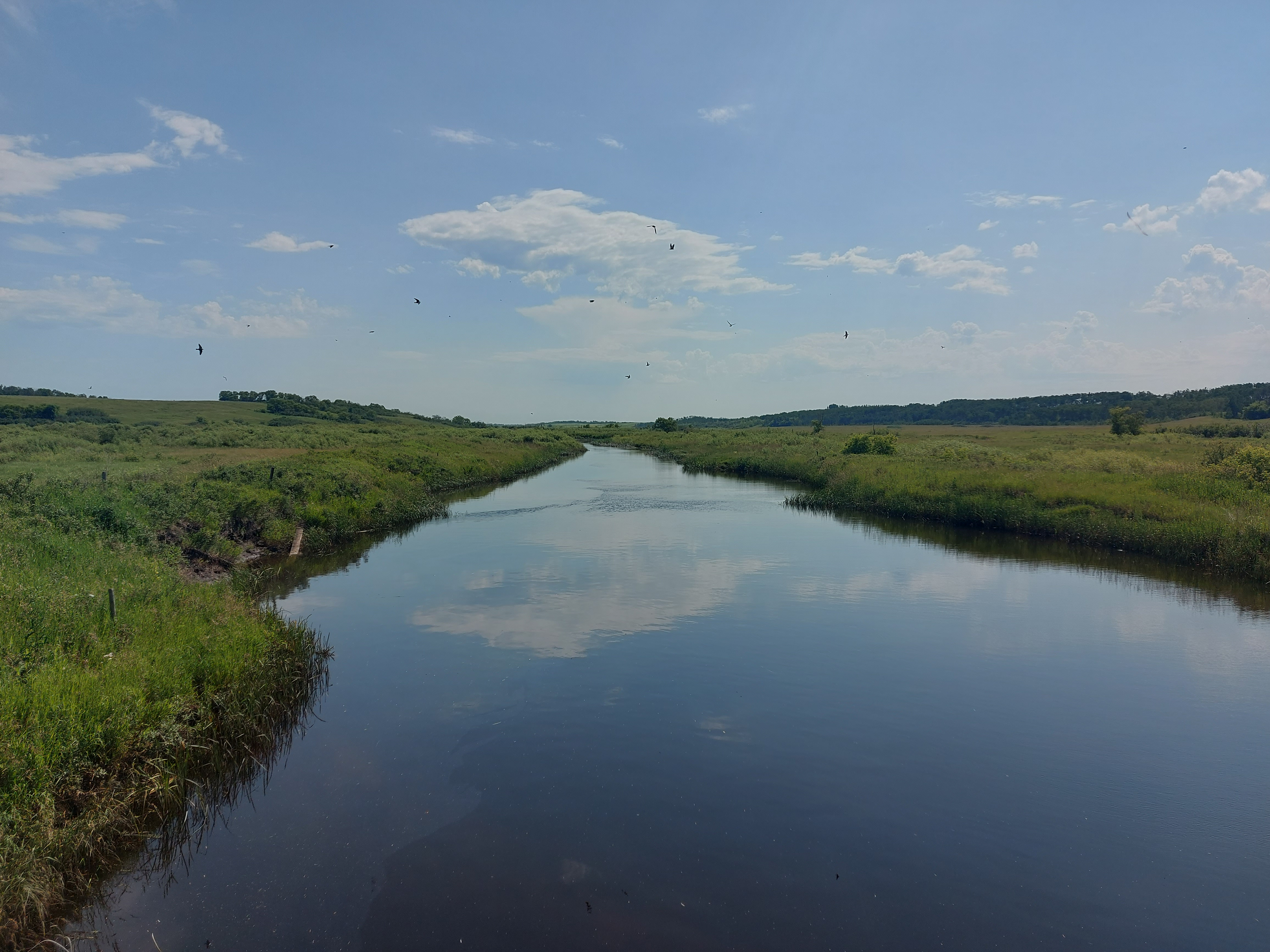
- Whitesand River

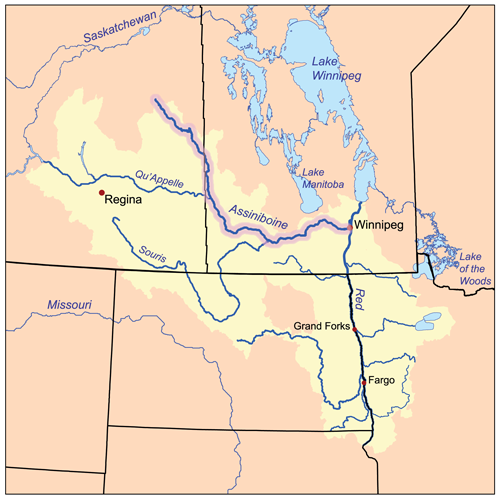
- Assiniboine River

- Location of the mouth of the Whitesand River Whitesand River (Saskatchewan) (Canada)

Location
- Country: Canada
- Province: Saskatchewan

Physical characteristics
- Source: Whitesand Lake
  - location: Beaver Hills
  - coordinates: 51°45′49″N 103°19′54″W
- Mouth: Assiniboine River
  - location: near Kamsack
  - coordinates: 51°34′04″N 101°55′25″W
  - elevation: 434 m (1,424 ft)

Basin features
- River system: Red River
- Tributaries
  - right: Wallace Creek; Yorkton Creek; Spirit Creek

The Whitesand River is a tributary of the Assiniboine River and finds its headwaters at Whitesand Lake near Invermay in east-central Saskatchewan. Its mouth can be found at its confluence with the Assiniboine River near Kamsack.

== Tributaries ==
The following is a list of tributaries of the Whitesand River from the upper to lower watershed:

- Ebel Creek
- Lawrie Creek
- Yorkton Creek, known as the Little Whitesand River before the year 2000
  - Crescent Creek
  - Willow Brook
  - Cussed Creek
- Wallace Creek
- Spirit Creek, via a channel from Good Spirit Lake
- Crooked Hill Creek

== Parks and recreation ==
Whitesand River Recreation Site (51.5295°N 102.4536°W) is a reserve and conservation area along the banks of the Whitesand River. It is in the Rural Municipality of Good Lake No. 274 along Highway 9, about 12 kilometres (7.5 mi) south of Canora, and just north of where the Wallace Creek joins the Whitesand River.

Whitesand Regional Park, which is part of Saskatchewan's Regional Park system, is located just off the Yellowhead Highway at Theodore on the shore of Theodore Reservoir.

== Dams and bridges ==
- Theodore Reservoir (51.4426°N 102.8382°W) was created when the Theodore Dam was built in 1964. The dam is 14.6 metres (48 ft) high, and the reservoir has a capacity of 14,802 cubic decametres (12,000 acre⋅ft).
- Canora Weir is located near the town of Canora.

== Communities ==
- Invermay
- Yorkton
- Canora
- Theodore
- Springside

== Fish species ==
Fishing commonly found in the river include northern pike and carp.

== See also ==
- List of rivers of Saskatchewan
- Hudson Bay drainage basin
