= Invermay, Saskatchewan =

Village in Saskatchewan, Canada

Invermay
- Village
- Village of Invermay
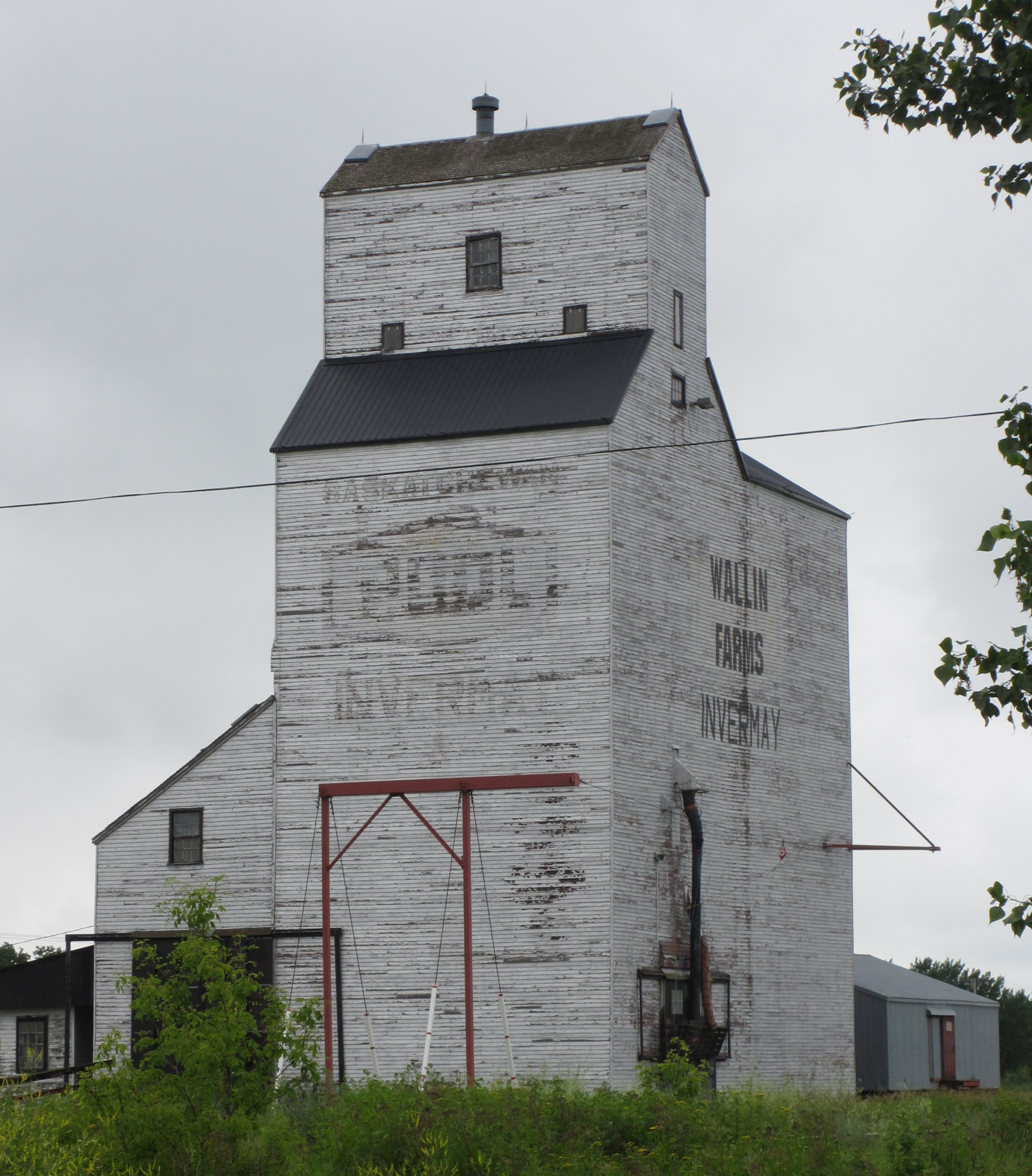
- Grain elevator in Invermay
- Motto: "The Crossroads Centre"
- Invermay in Saskatchewan Invermay (Canada)
- Coordinates: 51°48′21″N 103°09′23″W
- Country: Canada
- Province: Saskatchewan
- Region: East-central
- Census division: 9
- Rural municipality: Invermay No. 305

Government
  - Type: Mayor-Council
  - Governing body: Invermay Village Council
  - Mayor: David Wood
  - Administrator: Tracey Fey

Area
  - Urban: 1.22 km^{2} (0.47 sq mi)
- Elevation: 556 m (1,825 ft)

Population
  - Urban: 247
  - Urban density: 201.8/km^{2} (523/sq mi)
- Time zone: UTC-6 (CST)
  - Summer (DST): UTC-6 (CST (No DST))
- Postal code: S0A 1M0
- Area codes: 306/639
- Highways: Highway 5 / Highway 617
- Railways: Canadian National Railway

Invermay (2016 population: 273) is a village in the Canadian province of Saskatchewan within the Rural Municipality of Invermay No. 305 and Census Division No. 9. Invermay is about 50 km west of Canora and about 50 km east of Wadena on Highway 5.

== History ==
Invermay incorporated as a village on September 1, 1908.

== Demographics ==
Population history (1981–2016)
Year	Pop.	±%
1981	353	—
1986	384	+8.8%
1991	328	−14.6%
1996	295	−10.1%
2001	284	−3.7%
2006	262	−7.7%
2011	247	−5.7%
2016	273	+10.5%
Source: Statistics Canada via Saskatchewan Bureau of Statistics

In the 2021 Census of Population conducted by Statistics Canada, Invermay had a population of 272 living in 102 of its 112 total private dwellings, a change of −0.4% from its 2016 population of 273. With a land area of 1.2 km^{2} (0.46 sq mi), it had a population density of 226.7/km^{2} (587.1/sq mi) in 2021.

In the 2016 Census of Population, the Village of Invermay recorded a population of 273 living in 105 of its 131 total private dwellings, a 9.5% change from its 2011 population of 247. With a land area of 1.22 km^{2} (0.47 sq mi), it had a population density of 223.8/km^{2} (579.6/sq mi) in 2016.

== Notable people ==
- Ken Krawetz, served as a Saskatchewan MLA for the riding of Canora-Pelly from 1995 to 2016

== See also ==
- List of communities in Saskatchewan
- List of illages in Saskatchewan
