= Rural Municipality of Cana No. 214 =

Rural municipality in Saskatchewan, Canada

Cana No. 214
- Rural municipality
- Rural Municipality of Cana No. 214
- Location of the RM of Cana No. 214 in Saskatchewan
- Coordinates: 50.951°N 102.616°W
- Country: Canada
- Province: Saskatchewan
- Census division: 5
- SARM division: 1
- Formed: December 13, 1909

Government
  - Reeve: Robert Almasi
  - Governing body: RM of Cana No. 214 Council
  - Administrator: Kali Tourney
  - Office location: Melville

Area (2016)
  - Land: 820.9 km^{2} (317.0 sq mi)

Population (2016)
  - Total: 867
  - Density: 1.1/km^{2} (2.8/sq mi)
- Time zone: CST
  - Summer (DST): CST
- Area codes: 306 and 639

The Rural Municipality of Cana No. 214 (2016 population: 867) is a rural municipality (RM) in the Canadian province of Saskatchewan within Census Division No. 5 and SARM Division No. 1. It is located in the southeast portion of the province.

== History ==
The RM of Cana No. 214 incorporated as a rural municipality on December 13, 1909.

Heritage properties

There is one historical site located within the RM.

- Home Quarter of the Wotherspoon Farm - Constructed in 1905, this homestead is located 4 1/2 miles north of Melville on Highway 47. The homestead is being restored as a historical site.

== Demographics ==
Population history (1981–2016)
Year	Pop.	±%
1981	1,238	—
1986	1,235	−0.2%
1991	1,129	−8.6%
1996	1,014	−10.2%
2001	952	−6.1%
2006	850	−10.7%
2011	858	+0.9%
2016	867	+1.0%
Source: Statistics Canada via Saskatchewan Bureau of Statistics

In the 2021 Census of Population conducted by Statistics Canada, the RM of Cana No. 214 had a population of 904 living in 343 of its 381 total private dwellings, a change of 4.3% from its 2016 population of 867. With a land area of 813.42 km^{2} (314.06 sq mi), it had a population density of 1.1/km^{2} (2.9/sq mi) in 2021.

In the 2016 Census of Population, the RM of Cana No. 214 recorded a population of 867 living in 337 of its 372 total private dwellings, a 1% change from its 2011 population of 858. With a land area of 820.9 km^{2} (317.0 sq mi), it had a population density of 1.1/km^{2} (2.7/sq mi) in 2016.

== Government ==
The RM of Cana No. 214 is governed by an elected municipal council and an appointed administrator that meets on the second Tuesday of every month. The reeve of the RM is Robert Almasi while its administrator is Kali Tourney. The RM's office is located in Melville.

== Transportation ==
Melville Municipal Airport is located within the rural municipality.
