= Tiny, Saskatchewan =

Community in Saskatchewan, Canada

Tiny
- Hamlet
- Location within Saskatchewan Location within Canada
- Coordinates: 51°40′16″N 102°35′50″W
- Country: Canada
- Province: Saskatchewan
- Census division: 9
- Rural municipality: Buchanan No. 304

Government
  - Governing body: Buchanan Rural Municipality
- Time zone: CST
- Area code: 306
- Highways: Highway 5 Highway 664
- Railways: Canadian National Railway

Tiny is an unincorporated community in Rural Municipality of Buchanan No. 304, Saskatchewan, Canada. The locality is located at the intersection of Highway 5 and Highway 664, about 250 kilometres (160 mi) northeast of Regina and 294 kilometres (183 mi) east of Saskatoon.

== See also ==
- List of communities in Saskatchewan
