= Gorlitz, Saskatchewan =

Hamlet in Saskatchewan, Canada

Coordinates: 51.450°N 102.433°W

Gorlitz
- Hamlet
- Location in Saskatchewan
- Country: Canada
- Province: Saskatchewan
- Division: No. 9
- Founder: Karl Gebek
- Named for: Görlitz, Saxony, Germany

Gorlitz is a hamlet in southeastern Saskatchewan. It is approximately 27 kilometres (17 mi) north of Yorkton and approximately 20 kilometres (12 mi) south of Canora along Highway 9. The hamlet was named after Görlitz in Saxony, Germany by Karl Gebek, a German settler.

== See also ==
- List of communities in Saskatchewan
