= Good Spirit Lake Provincial Park =

Provincial park in Saskatchewan, Canada

- IUCN category II (national park)
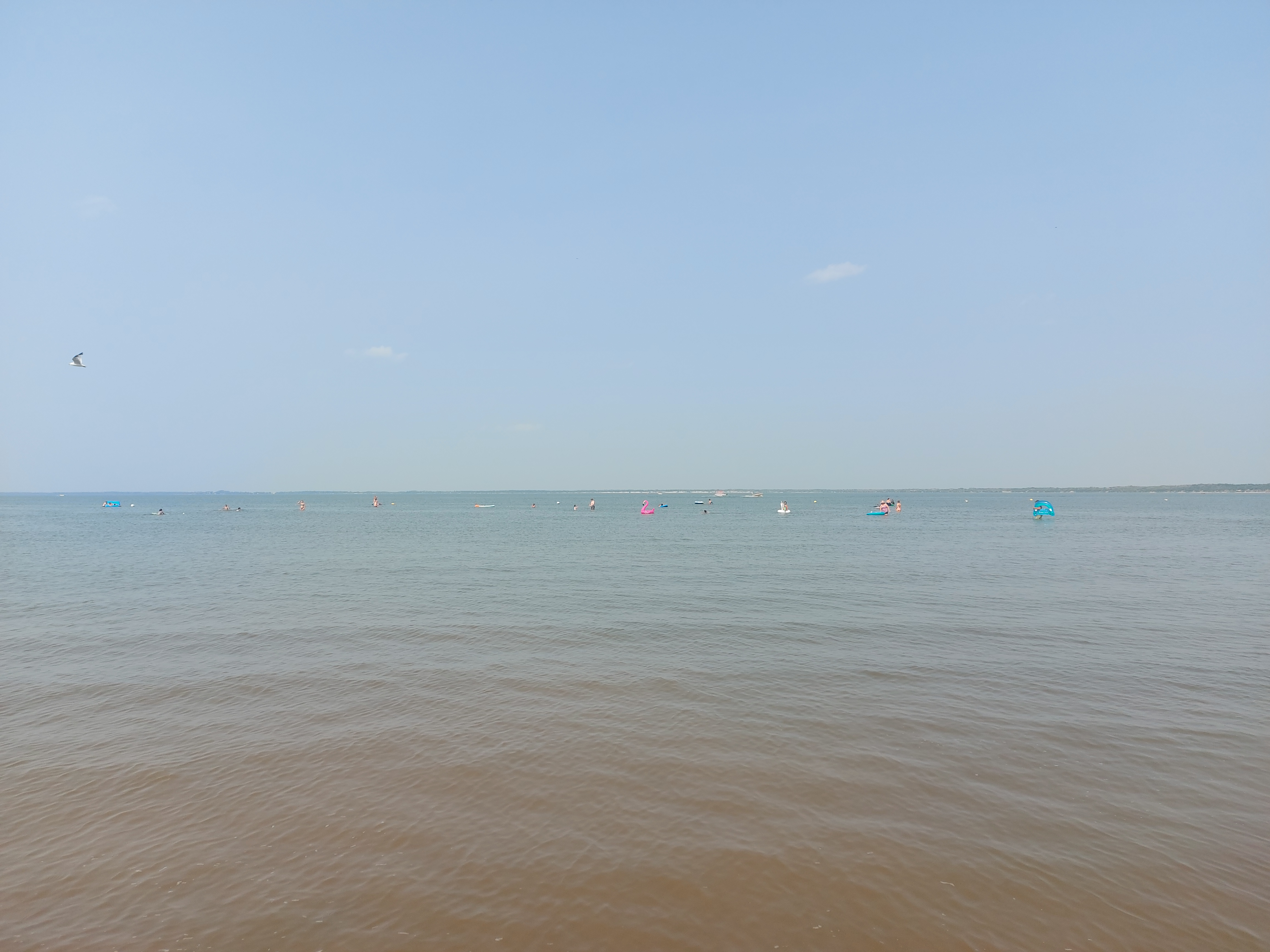
- Good Spirit Lake

- Location within Saskatchewan Location within Canada
- Location: Saskatchewan
- Nearest city: Yorkton, Saskatchewan
- Coordinates: 51.5077°N 102.6195°W
- Established: 1931
- Governing body: Sask Parks

Good Spirit Lake Provincial Park is a provincial park on the eastern side of the Canadian province of Saskatchewan. Founded in 1931, the park surrounds the western and southern shores of Good Spirit Lake and is one of Saskatchewan's six founding provincial parks. The park is in the RM of Good Lake No. 274, about 48 kilometres (30 mi) north of the city of Yorkton. Highway 47 runs along the western boundary and Highway 229 provides access to the park's amenities.

Attractions and activities at the park include campgrounds, picnicking, boating, swimming, and hiking through sand dunes. Within the park is the Donald Gunn cottage subdivision. Two kilometres south of the park at Good Spirit Acres is Good Spirit Golf Resort.

== Attractions and amenities ==
There are three campgrounds with over 200 sites at Good Spirit Lake Provincial Park. Every campsite at Balsam Campground has electrical hookups while Sandy Ridge and Aspen Campgrounds have a mix of electric and non-electric sites. Facilities at the campground include potable water, laundry, a sani-dump, convenience store, playground, boat launch, mini-golf, and showers and washrooms. Other facilities include Mistik Resort cabin rentals and Good Spirit Bible Camp.

In 2004, Good Spirit Lake Beach was named by Maclean's Magazine as one of Canada's top 10 beaches for its shallow waters and natural sand. Kitchimanitou and Good Spirit Beaches are located by the campground on the south-western shore of the lake. Sandy Beach is located on the south-eastern shore of the lake at the park boundary, just south of Burgis Beach.

=== Dunes and trails ===
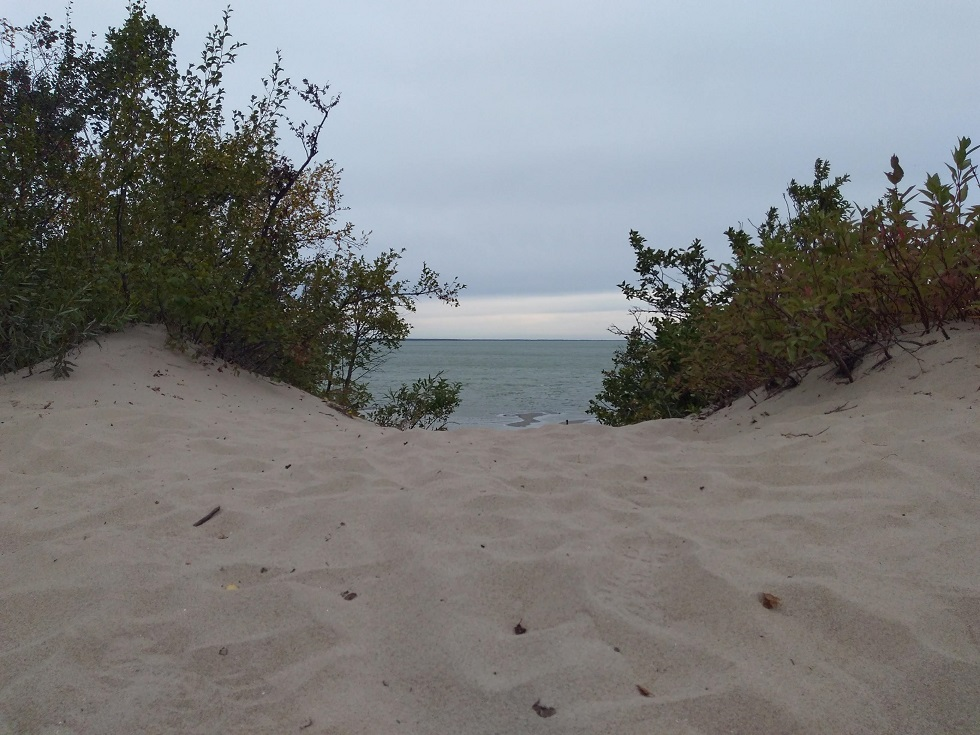
Sand dunes at Good Spirit Lake

At the southern end of the park and lake are naturally formed sand dunes that rise up to five storeys. The dunes and the sandy lake bottom were formed near the end of the last ice age when a river ran through the area and deposited the sands. Several trails totalling 39 kilometres (24 mi) traverse the park and the dunes, including a section of the Trans Canada Trail. The Dune Discovery Interpretive Trail winds its way along the dam at the southern end of the lake and through the sand dunes and is just over 3 kilometres (1.9 mi) long.

In the winter season, 18 kilometres (11 mi) of the trails are groomed for cross-country skiing and snowmobiling.

=== Fishing ===
There is no designated fishing pier and the shores around the lake are shallow and sandy; the best fishing is by boat. There is a boat launch in the park and several others around the lake. Fish commonly found in the lake include northern pike, perch, and walleye.

== See also ==
- List of protected areas of Saskatchewan
- Tourism in Saskatchewan
