= Beaver Hills (Saskatchewan) =

Hills in Saskatchewan, Canada

Coordinates: 51.30002758°N 103.434321276°W

Location of the Beaver Hills in Saskatchewan

The Beaver Hills are a range of hills located in the Canadian province of Saskatchewan. Yorkton is situated approximately 35 miles south-east of the hills.

The Whitesand River, a tributary of the Assiniboine River, originates in the Beaver Hills.

Large areas of native grasslands and shrubs can still be found in the Beaver Hills region, and along the Whitesand River. The hills are well-adapted for stock raising.

== History ==
Early colonization of the hills included a colony of three to four hundred Dakotans at Sheho, Saskatchewan. Disappointment at the lack of the promised transcontinental rail line caused these numbers to dwindle to just a few by the late 1800s.

In 1897 the first Galician (Ukrainian) colony in Canada, consisting of 511 families, was established at Beaver Hills.

In 1903 telephone service was extended to Beaver Hills. The towns of Ituna, Saskatchewan and Kelliher, Saskatchewan are located in the Beaver Hills.

A large boulder with a carved face petroglyph was found on 25 December 1905 by Charles Noddings from the Beaver Hills area, and was the stimulus for the creation of the Royal Saskatchewan Museum in 1906.

Bernard Leo Korchinski, Liberal member for the provincial riding of Redberry from 1948–1952 and 1956–1960, was born in the Beaver Hills in 1905.

== See also ==
- List of mountains of Saskatchewan
