= Etomami Lake =

Lake in Saskatchewan, Canada

- Location in Saskatchewan Etomami Lake (Canada)
- Location: RM of Preeceville No. 334, Saskatchewan
- Coordinates: 52.2556°N 102.6512°W
- Type: Bifurcation lake
- Part of: Nelson River drainage basin
- River sources: Porcupine Hills
- Primary outflows: Etomami River; Lilian River
- Basin countries: Canada
- Surface area: 19.3 ha (48 acres)
- Shore length^{1}: 4 km (2.5 mi)
- Surface elevation: 524 m (1,719 ft)
- Settlements: None
- ^{1} Shore length is not a well-defined measure.

Etomami Lake is a bifurcating lake in the east-central part of the Canadian province of Saskatchewan. The lake is in a glacier-carved valley in the Porcupine Hills within the Rural Municipality of Preeceville No. 334. It is the headwaters for both the Etomami and the Lilian Rivers. Henry Kelsey of the Hudson's Bay Company travelled past the lake in 1691 when he went from the Etomami River system to the Lilian.

Etomami is Cree for "where 3 rivers join" which is in reference to where the three rivers of Etomami, Red Deer, and Fir meet near the town of Hudson Bay.

== History ==
In 1691, Hudson's Bay Company fur trader and explorer Henry Kelsey traversed the natural portage between the Etomami and Lilian Rivers while in search of a route to the aspen parkland region. He had travelled south up the Etomami River from the Red Deer River to Etomami Lake where he crossed over to the Lilian River system. He was following a trail known to be used by the local Indigenous peoples.

== Description ==
Etomami Lake is a small, narrow lake with an area of 48 hectares (120 acres) and a shoreline of 4 kilometres (2.5 mi). The lake sits in a glacial spillway in the Porcupine Hills of east-central Saskatchewan and has two outflows. The Etomami River flows out of the north end of the lake where it meets the Red Deer River near the town of Hudson Bay. At the southern end of the lake is a swampy area that flows downstream into neighbouring Lilian Lake. This is the source of the Lilian River which, from there, heads in a southerly direction and meets the Assiniboine River at Sturgis. Both rivers are within the Nelson River watershed. Via Rail's Winnipeg–Churchill train runs along the western shore of the lake through the valley while Highway 9 travels past the eastern shore above the valley.

== See also ==
- List of lakes of Saskatchewan
- Assiniboine River fur trade
