= Saskatchewan Highway 9 =

Provincial highway in Saskatchewan, Canada

Highway 9
- Saskota Flyway Scenic Drive Route; Saskota Flyway; Northern Woods and Water Route (segment)
- Highway 9 highlighted in red
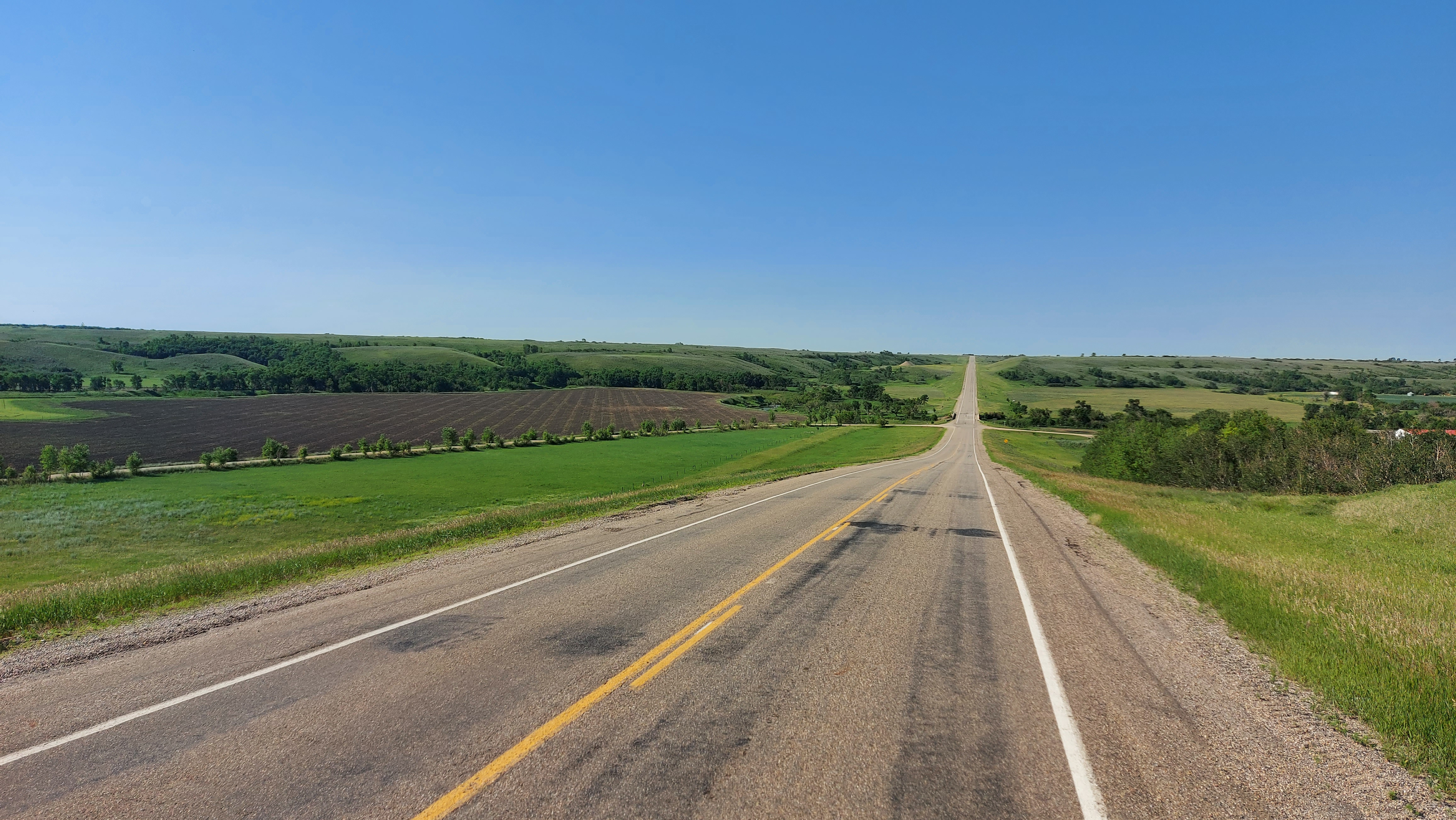
- Highway 9 through the Souris River Valley

Route information
- Maintained by Ministry of Highways and Infrastructure
- Length: 606.2 km (376.7 mi)

Major junctions
- South end: ND 8 at the U.S. border in Northgate
- Highway 18 near Alameda; Highway 13 near Carlyle; Highway 48 near Kennedy; Highway 1 (TCH) in Whitewood; Highway 15 east of Melville; Highway 10 in Yorkton; Highway 16 (TCH/YH) in Yorkton; Highway 5 in Canora; Highway 3 in Hudson Bay; Highway 55 east of Mountain Cabin
- North end: PR 283 at Manitoba border

Location
- Country: Canada
- Province: Saskatchewan
- Rural municipalities: Eniskillen No. 3, Moose Creek No. 33, Moose Mountain No. 63, Wawken No. 93, Silverwood No. 123, Willowdale No. 153, Fertile Belt No. 183, Grayson No. 184, Cana No. 214, Orkney No. 244, Good Lake No. 274, Buchanan No. 304, Keys No. 303, Clayton No. 333, Preeceville No. 334, Hudson Bay No. 394, Northern Administration District
- Major cities: Yorkton

Highway system
- Provincial highways in Saskatchewan
← Highway 8	→ Highway 10

Highway 9, also called the Saskota Flyway, is a north–south, undivided provincial highway in Saskatchewan, Canada. It runs from North Dakota Highway 8 at the US border near Port of Northgate until it transitions into Provincial Road 283 at the Manitoba provincial boundary. Highway 9 is about 606 kilometres (377 mi) long and passes through the city of Yorkton and the towns of Alameda, Carlyle, Whitewood, Canora, Sturgis, Preeceville, and Hudson Bay. Major highways it intersects include Highway 1 (Trans-Canada highway), Highway 16 (Yellowhead Highway), and Highway 5. While most of it is a paved, two-lane highway, it is a gravel surfaced road from a few kilometres north of the town of Hudson Bay to its northern terminus at the Manitoba border. For short stretches through some of the larger communities, the highway is four lanes. The final 37 kilometres (23 mi) of Highway 9 runs concurrently with Highway 55 as part of the Northern Woods and Water Route.

Highway 9 passes by many notable lakes, traverses plateaus, and crosses major rivers such as the Souris, Qu'Appelle, and the Assiniboine. Along its route, there is also access to several parks and recreational areas.

== History ==
The 1881 Dominion Land Survey divided southern Saskatchewan (as well as much of Western Canada) into six-mile by six-mile townships. Each township was further divided into 36 one-mile by one-mile sections. Sixty-six foot wide road allowances were created every mile running north and south and every two miles running east and west along the section lines. Highway 9, like other early provincial highways, followed these road allowances.

In 1922 a severe flood covered about 50% of the land between Yorkton and Canora taking out road and railway grades, including long sections of Provincial Highway 9.

In 1926 Preeceville was the northern terminus of Provincial Highway 9.

The route for the southern part of Provincial Highway 9 near Carlyle was surveyed in 1929. In 1930–31, it was graded and part of it was gravelled. Further gravelling was done in 1933. Further upgrades were needed, so in "about 1952, rural municipal councils realized they had to improve their road system to accommodate heavier loads and faster traffic.... road standards were set by the Government. Finally it was agreed the Government would pay sixty per cent and the municipality the remainder". The highway was then upgraded and oiled in 1956 north of Carlyle to Kenosee and Carlyle Lakes. In 1965–54 it was oiled south of town. Finally, in 1969–70, it was built up for heavier loads and paved.

== Route description ==
Highway 9 begins at the Canada–United States border crossing in the south-eastern part of Saskatchewan and heads north to the east-central part of Saskatchewan ending at the border with Manitoba. Along the way, it crosses both the Trans-Canada Highway and Yellowhead Highway. Once in Manitoba, the highway continues to The Pas as Provincial Road 283. Along the route, Highway 9 traverses landscapes that transition from prairie grasslands in the south to boreal forest in the north. It passes through several towns, crosses multiple rivers, climbs plateaus, and provides access to several parks and recreational areas.

=== U.S. border to the Trans-Canada Highway ===
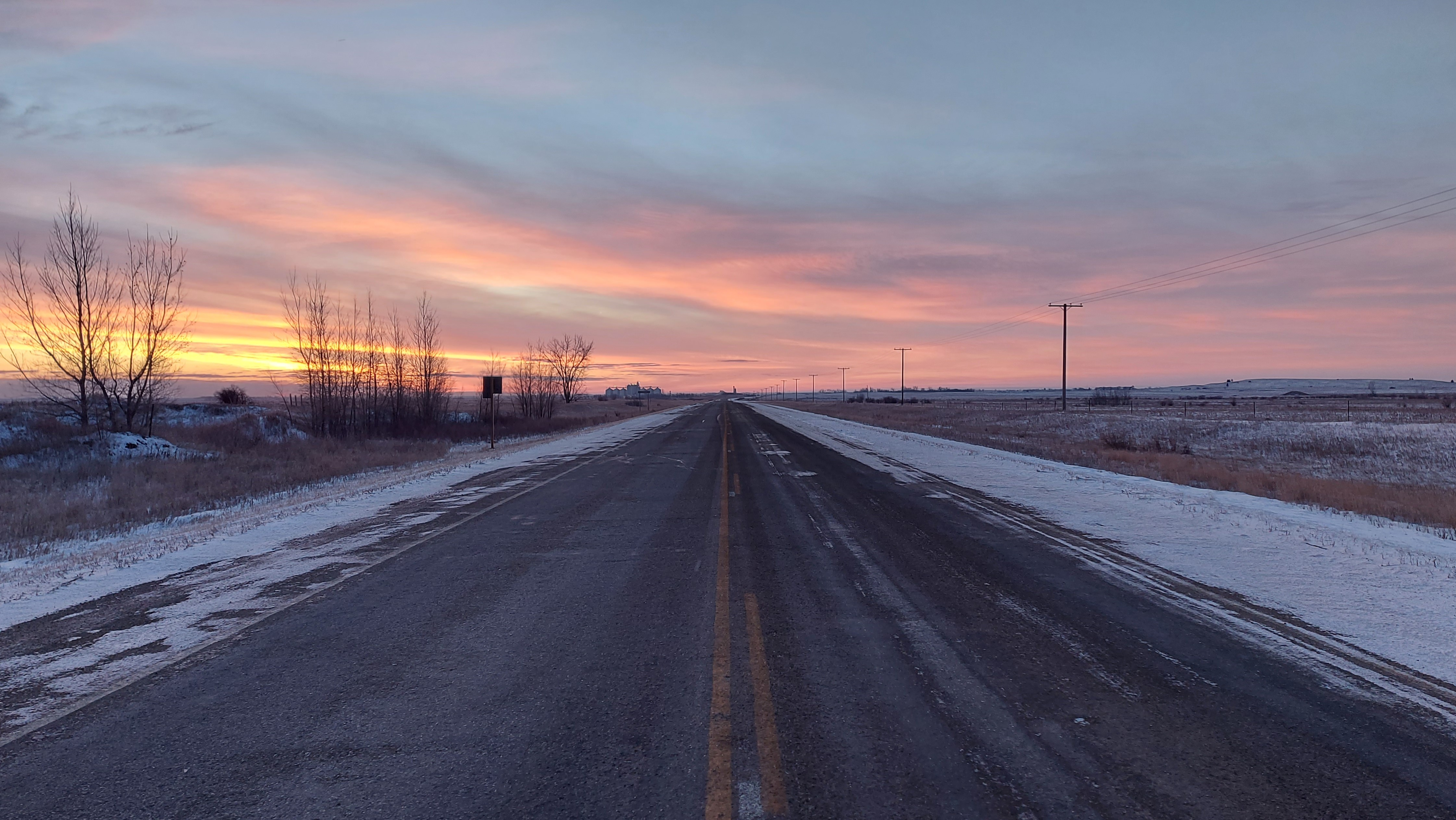
Highway 9 near Elcott at dawn

The southern terminus of Highway 9 begins at the Northgate Border Crossing and heads north. It continues south into the U.S. state of North Dakota as Highway 8. Adjacent to, and east of, the border crossing are the border communities of Northgate, Saskatchewan and Northgate, North Dakota. The original routing of Highway 9 went through the Canadian Northgate to the border station that was between the two Northgates. The two highways were rerouted about 0.5 miles (0.80 km) to the west of the Northgates in 1962. Continuing north from the border crossing, Highway 9 passes by Ceres Northgate Inland Terminal and crosses the Des Lacs River. From that river crossing, the highway bends to the north-west and intersects Highway 603 at its southern terminus (this section of the 603 is known as the Elcott Road as the former community of Elcott sat at this intersection). About 1.6 kilometres (1 mi) from the Elcott Road, Highway 9 turns north-east and descends into the Souris River Valley before crossing the Souris River and climbing up the other side. Once out of the valley, Highway 9 heads north for 16 kilometres (9.9 mi) before intersecting the east–west Highway 18. After a short 1.6 kilometres (1 mi) eastward concurrency with 18, 9 resumes it northerly travels. 3.2 kilometres (2.0 mi) from leaving the concurrency with 18, 9 intersects Township Road 40 at the south-east corner of Alameda. Eastbound on Township 40 crosses the Grant Devine Dam and provides access to Moose Creek Regional Park while west bound accesses Alameda. Continuing north from Alameda, Highway 9 heads to Carlyle. Along this stretch of highway, 9 intersects the eastern terminus of Highway 700, has a 3.2-kilometre (2 mi) long concurrency with the east–west Highway 361, and crosses Moose Mountain Creek.

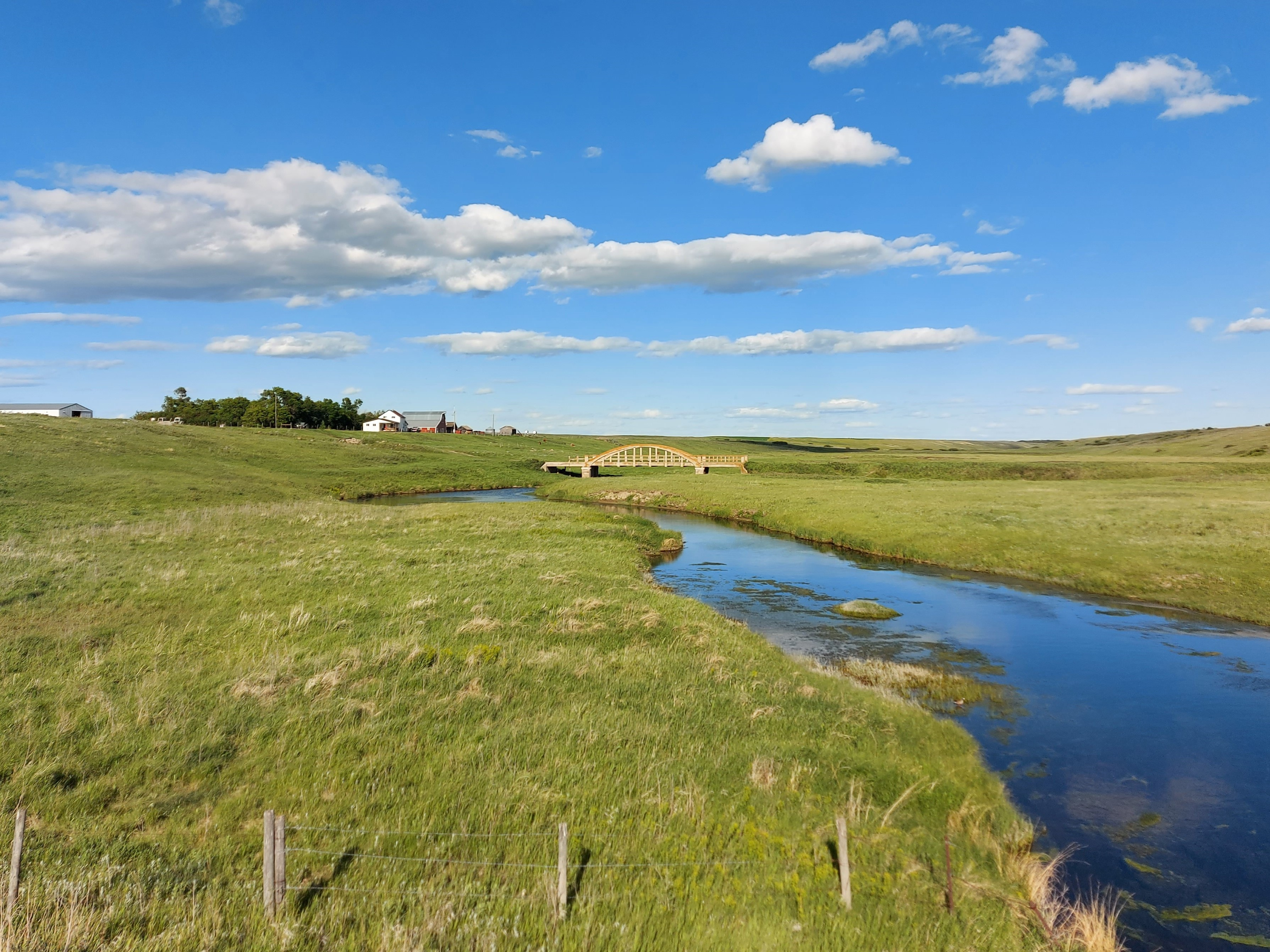
Abandoned Highway 9 Bridge that crosses Moose Mountain Creek, about 8 km (5.0 mi) south of Carlyle

Carlyle, which is at the intersections of Highway 9 and Highway 13 (the Red Coat Trail), has been dubbed the "gateway to the Moose Mountain resorts" as it is just south of Moose Mountain Upland and the recreational amenities found there. The upland is a large, forested plateau covering an area of about 13,000 square kilometres (5,000 sq mi). Highway 9, after a short 1.8-kilometre (1.1 mi) long westbound concurrency with Highway 13, heads north over the Moose Mountain Upland. Entering the upland, Highway 9 travels through the White Bear Indian reserve and Moose Mountain Provincial Park. Communities along Highway 9 through the plateau include Carlyle Lake Resort and Kenosee Lake. Carlyle Lake Resort — the main population centre of the White Bear Indian reserve — is situated along Highway 9 and the shores of White Bear (Carlyle) Lake. Attractions at Carlyle Lake Resort include a beach, the White Bear golf course, and the Bear Claw Casino & Hotel. The village of Kenosee Lake is on the northern shore of Kenosee Lake and is surrounded by Moose Mountain Provincial Park. Access to the park and its amenities is from Highway 209. As Highway 9 heads down the northern slopes of the plateau, it is met by the east–west Highway 48. The two highways share a 13-kilometre (8.1 mi) long northbound concurrency that ends just east of the village of Kennedy. Continuing north, Highway 9 passes by Langbank and intersects Highways 709 and 703 en route to Whitewood and Highway 1, the Trans-Canada Highway. At the intersection of 9 and 703 is a cairn commemorating the site of the historic St. Hubert Mission.

=== Trans-Canada Highway to the Assiniboine River ===
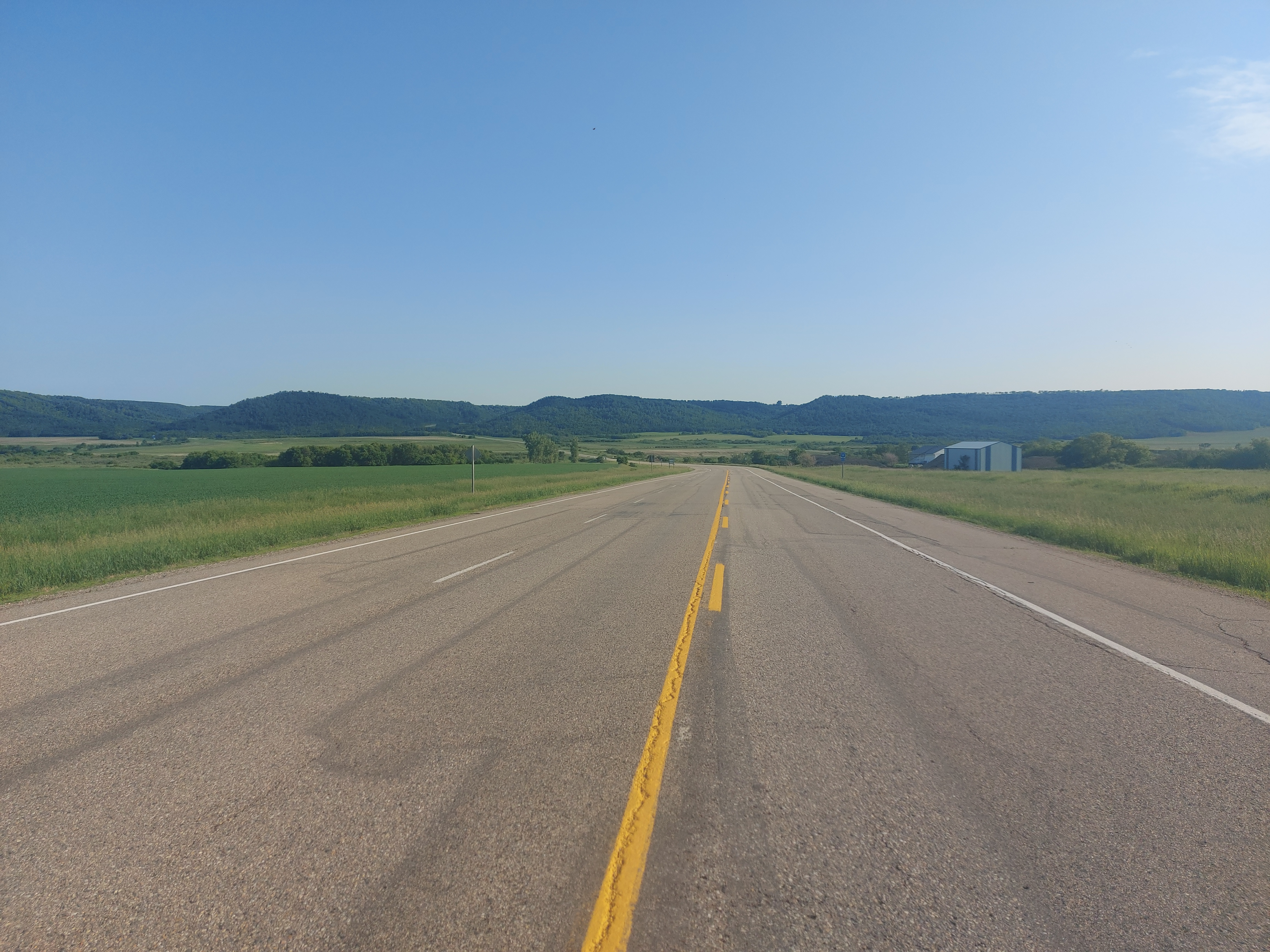
Highway 9 through the Qu'Appelle Valley

Highway 9 crosses the Trans-Canada Highway and continues north towards the Qu'Appelle Valley. As it approaches the valley, it heads down into the Scissor Creek coulee and then climbs back up the other side. There are slow vehicle passing lanes on either side. Once the highway is out of the coulee, it travels a further 3 kilometres (1.9 mi) before descending down into the Qu'Appelle Valley. The southbound side of the highway has a slow vehicle passing lane. The valley is a large, flat bottomed valley that was carved by glaciers at the end of the last ice age. In the valley, Highway 9 crosses the Qu'Appelle River and is met by the westbound Highway 247 that provides access to Round Lake and its amenities. Farther west along Highway 247 is Crooked Lake Provincial Park. As Highway 9 begins its ascent out of the valley, it is met by the western terminus of Highway 637 and begins a northbound slow vehicle passing lane. About 16 kilometres (9.9 mi) north of the valley, Highway 9 comes to a stop sign at Highway 22 and the community of Stockholm. It then follows 22 in a west, then northbound concurrency for 18 kilometres (11 mi). The community of Dubuc and an intersection with Highway 638 are along this stretch. At the point where the concurrencies end, 22 turns west and 9 continues north to Highway 15. It crosses 15 and travels in a northerly direction past Crescent Lake, Leech Lake, and York Lake and across Crescent Creek and Yorkton Creek en route to Yorkton — the only city on Highway 9.

At the south-eastern corner of Yorkton, Highway 9 meets Highways 10 and 16 (the Yellowhead Highway) and begins a northbound concurrency with them that runs along the eastern side of the city. Highway 10 runs concurrently for 1.7 kilometres (1.1 mi) before turning east while 16 continues concurrently for a further 1.6 kilometres (1 mi) before turning west. From the initial intersection with 10 and 16, the highway is four lanes until the overpass at Darlington Street E. Leaving Yorkton after the concurrency with 16 ends at the north-eastern part of the city, Highway 9 travels in a northerly direction until it intersects Highway 49. Along this segment, Highway 9 provides access to Yorkton Regional Airport, Ebenezer, Gorlitz, Whitesand River Recreation Site, Burgis, Canora, and Crystal Lake. It also crosses the Yorkton Creek (again), Whitesand River, and the Assiniboine River. Intersected highways include 309, 650, 229, 5, and 754. Highway 229 goes west to Good Spirit Lake Provincial Park and 5 shares a 1.5-kilometre (0.93 mi) long concurrency with 9 through Canora. Also, a 2.4-kilometre (1.5 mi) long section of 9 through Canora is four lanes.

=== The Assiniboine River to the Manitoba border ===
At the intersection with Highway 49, Highways 9 and 49 begin a 20-kilometre (12 mi) concurrency that travels north-west towards Preeceville following the Assiniboine River. This section of highway provides access to the town of Sturgis and the Sturgis & District Regional Park. As the highway nears Preeceville, 9 turns north while 49 continues west into town. Highway 9 then follows the Lilian River and Via Rail's Winnipeg–Churchill railway north into the Porcupine Hills. Along the way, it provides access to Lady Lake Regional Park, passes through the community of Lady Lake, and intersects Highway 753 at Hinchliffe. The communities of Endeavour and Usherville are situated along the railway with access roads to Highway 9.

The Lilian River, with its source at Etomami Lake, is part of a natural portage through the Porcupine Hills that connects the Assiniboine watershed to the Red Deer River watershed via the Etomami River. In 1691, Hudson's Bay Company fur trader and explorer Henry Kelsey traversed it while in search of a route to the aspen parkland region. The Porcupine Hills are part of the Manitoba Escarpment and is the location of Porcupine Provincial Forest and Porcupine Hills Provincial Park.

Following the Lilian River north, Highway 9 approaches Etomami Lake passing the historical portage. Once past the lake, it then enters the Red Deer River watershed and follows the Etomami River in a northerly direction through the hills en route to the Red Deer River and the town of Hudson Bay. Coming out of the hills, it intersects Highway 983, passes through Reserve, meets the eastern terminus of Highway 23 at Bertwell, provides access to Dagg Creek Recreation Site, and intersects Highway 982. Highway 9 then crosses the Red Deer River just east of where the Etomami River joins the Red Deer River and about 4 kilometres (2 mi) south of the town of Hudson Bay. Once across the river, Highway 9 passes alongside Hudson Bay Regional Park and continues in a northerly direction skirting around the western limits of Hudson Bay. On the western side of town, Highway 9 runs as Marcotte Street and meets the east–west Highway 3. The two highways begin a 1.3-kilometre (0.81 mi) long concurrency that first continues north, then bends east around the town's northern limits as Railway Avenue. Highway 3 continues east while 9 turns north into the Pasquia Hills. The Pasquia Hills are part of the Manitoba Escarpment.

Initially continuing north alongside the Winnipeg–Churchill railway, Highway 9 turns to gravel at an intersection 7.6 kilometres (4.7 mi) north of Hudson Bay. East at that intersection goes to Ruby Lake Recreation Site. It remains a gravel highway for the next 115 kilometres (71 mi) until its northern terminus. From Ruby Lake, the highway continues north traversing the eastern slopes of the Pasquia Hills. Wildcat Hill Provincial Park is a prominent feature of the hills. Running through the hills, Highway 9 crosses several rivers, such as Overflowing River, Pasquia River, Waskwei River, and Bainbridge River. Near the north-eastern slopes, the highway provides access to Mountain Cabin Recreation Site and meets Highway 55. The two highways then run concurrently for the next 35 kilometres (22 mi) to the Manitoba border. Shortly after meeting Highway 55, Highway 9 approaches Carrot River and then follows it in a north-easterly direction. It passes through the Opaskwayak Indian reserve 27A and then continues to follow the Carrot River to the Manitoba border where it carries on as Manitoba Provincial Road 283 to The Pas, Manitoba.

== Major intersections ==
From south to north:

County	Location	km	mi	Destinations	Notes
Eniskillen No. 3	Northgate	0.0	0.0	ND 8 south – Bowbells, Stanley	Continuation into North Dakota
Eniskillen No. 3	Northgate	0.0	0.0	Canada–United States border at Northgate Border Crossing	
Eniskillen No. 3	Elcott	5.3	3.3	Highway 603 north (Elcott Road)	
Eniskillen No. 3		26.7	16.6	Highway 18 west – Estevan	South end of Highway 18 concurrency
Eniskillen No. 3		28.5	17.7	Highway 18 east – Oxbow, Carnduff	North end of Highway 18 concurrency
Moose Creek No. 33	Alameda	32.3	20.1		
Moose Creek No. 33		37.0	23.0	Highway 700 west – Steelman	
Moose Creek No. 33		47.8	29.7	Highway 361 west – Lampman	South end of Highway 361 concurrency
Moose Creek No. 33		51.0	31.7	Highway 361 east – Alida	North end of Highway 361 concurrency
Moose Creek No. 33		54.4	33.8	Highway 702	
Moose Mountain No. 63	Carlyle	73.5	45.7	Highway 13 east (Red Coat Trail) – Redvers	South end of Highway 13 concurrency
Moose Mountain No. 63	Carlyle	74.2	46.1	Highway 13 west (Red Coat Trail) – Weyburn	North end of Highway 13 concurrency
Wawken No. 93	Kenosee Lake	96.8	60.1	Highway 209 west – Moose Mountain Provincial Park	
Wawken No. 93		105.6	65.6	Highway 48 east – Wawota, Virden	South end of Highway 48 concurrency
Wawken No. 93		107.2	66.6	Highway 711 west	
Wawken No. 93		108.8	67.6	Highway 48 west – Kennedy, Kipling	North end of Highway 48 concurrency
Silverwood No. 123		128.7	80.0	Highway 709 – Kipling, Moosomin	
Willowdale No. 153	Whitewood	155.5	96.6	Highway 1 (TCH) – Regina, Moosomin, Winnipeg	
Fertile Belt No. 183	Ochapowace No. 71	175.7	109.2	Highway 247 west – Round Lake	
Fertile Belt No. 183	Ochapowace No. 71	176.0	109.4	Highway 637 east – Esterhazy	
Fertile Belt No. 183	Stockholm	193.6	120.3	Highway 22 east – Esterhazy	South end of Highway 22 concurrency
Grayson No. 184	Dubuc	207.4	128.9	Highway 638 south – Broadview	
Grayson No. 184		211.6	131.5	Highway 22 west – Grayson, Killaly	North end of Highway 22 concurrency
Grayson No. 184		221.4	137.6	Bangor Access Road	
Cana No. 214		232.9	144.7	Highway 15 – Melville, Churchbridge	
Orkney No. 244	No major junctions				
City of Yorkton		265.2	164.8	Highway 10 west (Queen Street) – Melville, Regina; Highway 16 (TCH/YH) east – Langenburg, Winnipeg	South end of Highway 10 / Highway 16 concurrency
City of Yorkton		266.8	165.8	Highway 10 east / Highway 10A west / Highway 16A (TCH) west (Broadway Street) to Highway 52 – Dauphin, City Centre, Ituna	North end of Highway 10 concurrency
City of Yorkton		268.6	166.9	Highway 16 (TCH/YH) west (York Road) – Saskatoon	North end of Highway 16 concurrency
City of Yorkton		270.3	168.0	Grain Millers Drive to Highway 10 / Highway 52A	Bypass route
Orkney No. 244	Ebenezer	283.4	176.1	Highway 309 east – Rhein Highway 726 west – Springside	
Good Lake No. 274		298.2	185.3	Highway 229 west – Good Spirit Lake Provincial Park	
Good Lake No. 274	Canora	313.5	194.8	Highway 5 east – Kamsack	South end of Highway 5 concurrency
Good Lake No. 274	Canora	314.9	195.7	Highway 5 west – Wadena, Humboldt, Saskatoon	North end of Highway 5 concurrency
Buchanan No. 304		323.2	200.8	Highway 754 – Buchanan	
Keys No. 303		337.4	209.7	Tadmore access road	
Clayton No. 333		343.5	213.4	Highway 49 east – Norquay	South end of Highway 49 concurrency
Preeceville No. 334	Sturgis	355.5	220.9	Highway 664 south – Tiny	
Preeceville No. 334	Preeceville	363.1	225.6	Highway 49 west to Highway 47 south – Kelvington	North end of Highway 49 concurrency
Preeceville No. 334		374.7	232.8	Highway 753 – Lintlaw, Danbury	
Preeceville No. 334		386.0	239.8	Highway 759 west – Endeavour	
Hudson Bay No. 394		418.1	259.8	Highway 983 – McBride Lake	
Hudson Bay No. 394	Bertwell	436.8	271.4	Highway 23 north – Porcupine Plain	
Hudson Bay No. 394		452.7	281.3	Highway 982 south (Little Swan Road) – Swan Plain	
Hudson Bay No. 394	Hudson Bay	476.5	296.1	Highway 3 west – Tisdale, Melfort, Prince Albert	South end of Highway 3 concurrency
Hudson Bay No. 394	Hudson Bay	477.7	296.8	Highway 3 east – Swan River	North end of Highway 3 concurrency; paved section of Highway 9 ends 8 km (5 mi) north of Hudson Bay
Hudson Bay No. 394		484.3	300.9	Paved highway ends	
Hudson Bay No. 394		566.3	351.9	Highway 55 west (NWRR) – Nipawin, Prince Albert	South end of Highway 55 / Northern Woods and Water Route concurrency
Northern Administration District		606.2	376.7	PR 283 east (NWWR) – The Pas	Continuation into Manitoba; north end of Highway 55 concurrency
1.000 mi = 1.609 km; 1.000 km = 0.621 mi: Concurrency terminus; Route transition

== See also ==
- Roads in Saskatchewan
- Transportation in Saskatchewan
