= Lady Lake =

Lady Lake may refer to:

- Lady Lake (Vancouver Island), a lake on British Columbia's Vancouver Island
- Lady Lake, Florida, a town in Lake County, Florida, United States
- Lady Lake (Minnesota), a lake
- Lady Lake, Saskatchewan, a hamlet in Saskatchewan, Canada
- Lady Lake (Saskatchewan), a lake in Saskatchewan, Canada
- Lady Lake (album), an album by Gnidrolog
