= Hudson Bay (disambiguation) =

Hudson Bay may refer to:

== In geography ==
- Hudson Bay, a large body of water in northeastern Canada, also known as Hudson's Bay
  - Hudson Bay drainage basin, the drainage basin of Hudson Bay
- Hudson Bay, Saskatchewan, a town in Saskatchewan, Canada
  - Rural Municipality of Hudson Bay No. 394, the surrounding rural municipality
- Hudson Bay Regional Park, a park in Saskatchewan
- Hudson Bay (Nunavut electoral district), a territorial electoral district for the Legislative Assembly of Nunavut, Canada
- Hudson Bay (Northwest Territories electoral district), a former territorial electoral district in the Northwest Territories Legislature
- Hudson Bay, one of the five colonies of New France, apparently becoming Rupert's Land in 1763

== In transportation ==
- Winnipeg – Churchill train, formerly known as the Hudson Bay

== Other ==
- Hudson's Bay Company, a defunct Canadian retailer
  - Hudson's Bay (department store), the company's former department store chain

== See also ==
- Hudson's Bay (disambiguation)
