= Etomami River =

River in Saskatchewan, Canada

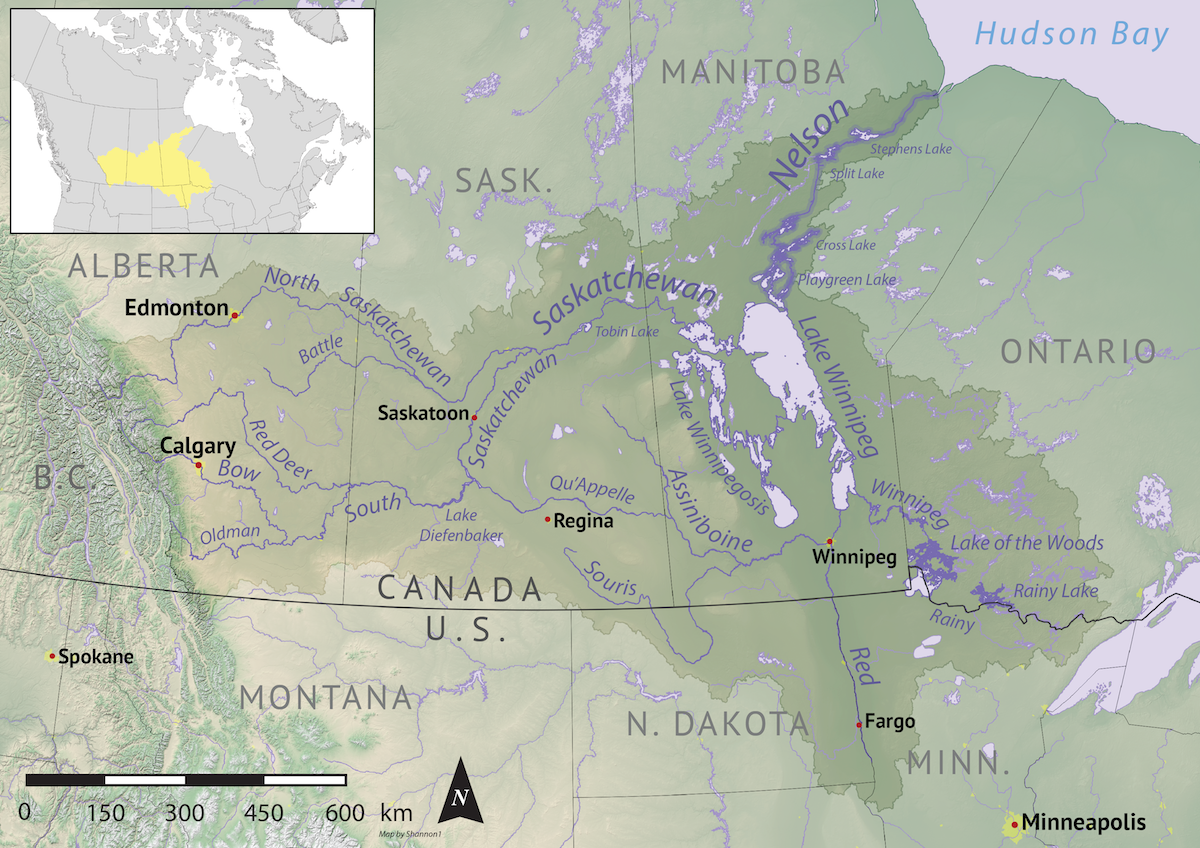
- Nelson River drainage basin

- Location of the mouth in Saskatchewan Etomami River (Canada)

Location
- Country: Canada
- Provinces: Saskatchewan

Physical characteristics
- Source: Etomami Lake
  - coordinates: 52°15′20″N 102°39′4″W
  - elevation: 524 m (1,719 ft)
- Mouth: Red Deer River
  - location: Hudson Bay Regional Park
  - coordinates: 52°49′40″N 102°22′17″W
  - elevation: 363 m (1,191 ft)

Basin features
- River system: Red Deer River drainage basin
- Tributaries
  - left: Piwei River; Shand Creek; Boundary Creek
  - right: Pepaw River; Loiselle Creek

Etomami River is a river in the Canadian province of Saskatchewan. The river originates in the Porcupine Hills and flows northward towards the town of Hudson Bay and into the Red Deer River. "Etomami" is a First Nations word that means "a place that three rivers join". It is in reference to the spot along the Red Deer River where the mouths of the Etomami and Fir Rivers meet the Red Deer River.

== Description ==
The river's source is at the north end of the bifurcating Etomami Lake in the RM of Preeceville No. 334 and flows northward through a deep-cut valley into the RM of Hudson Bay No. 394 following Via Rail's Winnipeg–Churchill train and Highway 9. The south end of the lake is the source of the Lilian River, which flows south into the Assiniboine River. In 1691, Hudson's Bay Company fur trader and explorer Henry Kelsey traversed the length of the Etomami River while in search of a route to the aspen parkland region. Following a trail known to be used by the local Indigenous peoples, at Etomami Lake, he crossed over to the Lilian River system. Etomami River's mouth is located on the Red Deer River on the south side of the town of Hudson Bay in the Hudson Bay Regional Park. The regional park itself is the site of an historical North West Company fur trading fort called Fort Red Deer River.

Upstream from the park along the river and Highway 9 is Dagg Creek Recreation Site, The site has campsites, picnicking, and access to the river.

== Tributaries ==
As the Etomami River flows northward, it is joined by several other rivers and creeks.

Etomami River mainstem

- Piwei River
  - Big Valley Creek
- Shand Creek
  - McKillop Creek
  - Bowman Creek
  - McNab Creek
- Pepaw River
- Boundary Creek
  - Bubbling Creek
- Loiselle Creek

== See also ==
- List of rivers of Saskatchewan
- Assiniboine River fur trade
- Hudson Bay drainage basin
