= Saskatchewan Highway 309 =

Provincial highway in Saskatchewan, Canada

Highway 309

Route information
- Maintained by Ministry of Highways and Infrastructure
- Length: 17.9 km (11.1 mi)

Major junctions
- West end: Highway 9 / Highway 726 near Ebenezer
- East end: Highway 637 / Highway 726 at Rhein

Location
- Country: Canada
- Province: Saskatchewan
- Rural municipalities: Orkney, Wallace

Highway system
- Provincial highways in Saskatchewan
← Highway 308	→ Highway 310

Highway 309 is a provincial highway in the Canadian province of Saskatchewan. It runs from Highway 9 near Ebenezer to Highway 637 in Rhein. It is about 18 kilometres (11 mi) long, and is concurrent with Highway 726 for its entire length.

== Route description ==
Hwy 309 begins in the Rural Municipality of Orkney No. 244 at an intersection with Hwy 9 (Saskota Flyway) just immediately to the south of the village of Ebenezer, with the road continuing west as Hwy 726. Concurrent (overlapped) with Hwy 726, the pair head due east to cross a railway and enter the Rural Municipality of Wallace No. 243, travelling through rural farmland for several kilometres to enter the village of Rhein. The highway crosses over a former railway line before coming to an end on the north side of town at the junction with Hwy 637 (Church Street), with Hwy 726 continuing east. The entire length of Hwy 309 is a paved, two-lane highway.

== Major intersections ==
From west to east:

Rural municipality	Location	km	mi	Destinations	Notes
Orkney No. 244		0.0	0.0	Highway 9 (Saskota Skyway) – Yorkton, Canora, Ebenezer Highway 726 west – Springside	Western terminus; western end of Hwy 726 concurrency; road continues east as Hwy 726
Wallace No. 243	Rhein	17.9	11.1	Highway 637 (Church Street) – Rhein, Veregin, Dunleath Highway 726 east – Stornoway	Eastern terminus; eastern end of Hwy 726 concurrency; road continues east as Hwy 726
1.000 mi = 1.609 km; 1.000 km = 0.621 mi: Concurrency terminus

== See also ==
- Transportation in Saskatchewan
- Roads in Saskatchewan
