= Lilian River =

River in Saskatchewan, Canada

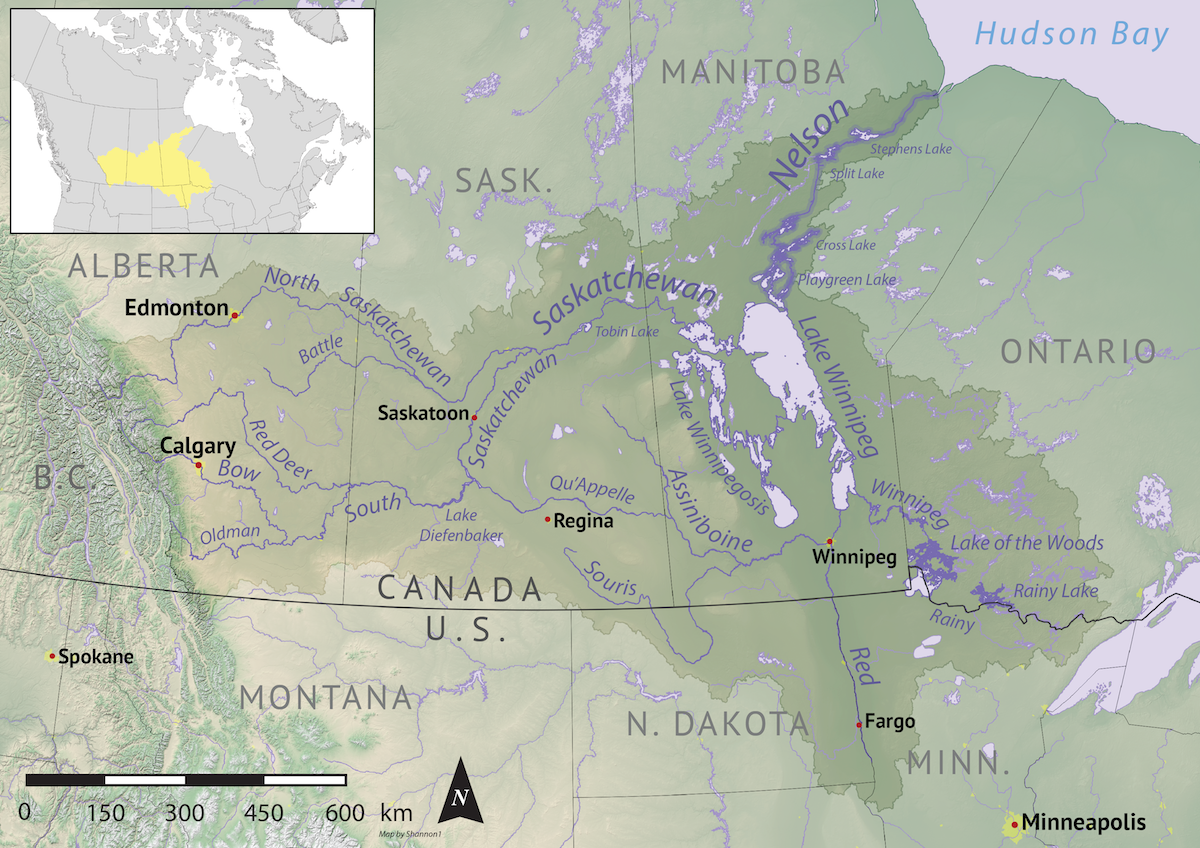
- Map of the Nelson River drainage basin

- Location of river's mouth in Saskatchewan Lilian River (Canada)

Location
- Country: Canada
- Province: Saskatchewan

Physical characteristics
- Source: Lilian Lake
  - location: RM of Preeceville No. 334
  - coordinates: 52.2259°N 102.6515°W
- Mouth: Assiniboine River
  - location: Sturgis
  - coordinates: 51.9403°N 102.5494°W

Basin features
- River system: Nelson River
- Tributaries
  - left: Kop Creek

Lilian River is a river in the Canadian province of Saskatchewan. The river begins at Lilian Lake in the Porcupine Hills and flows south to join to the Assiniboine River at the town of Sturgis. Lilian Lake is connected to the bifurcating Etomami Lake via a natural swampy portage making Etomami Lake the headwaters for both the north flowing Etomami River and the south flowing Lilian River. For most of the river's length, it is followed by Via Rail's Winnipeg–Churchill train and Highway 9. Several small communities and parks are situated on or near the river's banks.

== History ==
In 1691, Hudson's Bay Company fur trader and explorer Henry Kelsey traversed the natural portage between the Etomami and Lilian Rivers while in search of a route to the aspen parkland region. He had travelled south up the Etomami River from the Red Deer River to Etomami Lake where he crossed over to the Lilian River system. The Lilian River led him to the Assiniboine River. He was following a trail known to be used by the local Indigenous peoples.

== Description ==
Lilian River begins at the southern end of Lilian Lake and flows south out of the Porcupine Hills. Lilian Lake, at 47 hectares (120 acres), is a small lake with the hamlet of Usherville on its western shore. Heading south, alongside the Winnipeg–Churchill railway, the river runs by Endeavour, Hinchliffe, the Lady Lake section of Sturgis & Lady Lake Regional Park, and Lady Lake. Highway 9 parallels the river from its source to Lady Lake, at which point the highway crosses the river. The railway crosses the river south of Endeavour. Lilian River continues southward towards Sturgis where it once again gets crossed by the railway and Highway 9 before joining the Assiniboine River in the Sturgis section of the Sturgis & Lady Lake Regional Park.

== Fish species ==
Fish commonly found in Lilian River include northern pike.

== See also ==
- Assiniboine River fur trade
- List of rivers of Saskatchewan
- Hudson Bay drainage basin
