= Sturgis station =

Railway station in Saskatchewan, Canada

Sturgis

General information
- Location: Railway; Sturgis, SK; Canada
- Coordinates: 51°56′26″N 102°32′39″W
- Line: Winnipeg – Churchill train
- Platforms: 1
- Tracks: 1

Construction
- Structure type: Sign post
- Platform levels: 1

History
- Opened: 1918
- Former names: Canadian Northern Railway

Services
Preceding station	Via Rail	Following station
Endeavour toward Churchill	Winnipeg–Churchill	Canora toward Winnipeg
Former services
Preceding station	Canadian National Railway	Following station
Lady Lake toward Hudson Bay Junction	Regina – Hudson Bay Junction	Hassan toward Regina
Location

The Sturgis station is a railway station in Sturgis, Saskatchewan, Canada. It is a flag stop for Via Rail's Winnipeg–Churchill train.

The station building was originally constructed by the Canadian Northern Railway as a two-story third class station, in 1918; in 1986 the building was moved and turned into a museum. The station site is now served as a flag stop.
