= Lady Lake (Saskatchewan) =

Lake in Saskatchewan, Canada

- Location in Saskatchewan Lady Lake (Canada)
- Location: RM of Preeceville No. 334, Saskatchewan
- Coordinates: 52.0224°N 102.6488°W
- Part of: Red River drainage basin
- Primary inflows: Spring-fed
- Basin countries: Canada
- Max. length: 1.6 km (0.99 mi)
- Max. width: 0.8 km (0.50 mi)
- Surface area: 34.7 ha (86 acres)
- Max. depth: 5.7 m (19 ft)
- Shore length^{1}: 4.71 km (2.93 mi)
- Surface elevation: 514 m (1,686 ft)
- ^{1} Shore length is not a well-defined measure.

Lady Lake is a lake in the Canadian Province of Saskatchewan. It is a natural, spring-fed lake in the Rural Municipality of Preeceville No. 334. The lake is south of the Porcupine Hills and Porcupine Provincial Forest in the Boreal Transition ecozone. Along the lake's western shore is the Lady Lake section of Sturgis & District — Lady Lake Regional Park. To the east of the lake is the Lilian River and the community of Lady Lake. The closest town is Preeceville, which is about 11 kilometres (6.8 mi) by road to the south. Access to the lake and its amenities is from Highway 9.

At about 35 hectares (86 acres) in size and less than 6 metres (20 ft) deep, it is a small lake that has been used for recreation since before the formation of the regional park in 1967. The park was born out of 20 acres (8.1 ha) of land donated by the Gogal family from their original homestead. There is also a First Nations legend regarding the lake "which stems from a story of an Indian maiden who drowned herself rather than marry a man she did not love, who was chosen by her Chieftain father".

== Sturgis & District — Lady Lake Regional Park ==
Sturgis & District — Lady Lake Regional Park is a regional park divided into two sections. One section is on the western shore of Lady Lake (52.0272°N 102.6524°W) and the other is along the Assiniboine River at the town of Sturgis (51.9396°N 102.5471°W).

The Sturgis section of the regional park is a campground and picnic area adjacent to Sturgis on the banks of the Assiniboine River. Access is from Highway 664. The Lady Lake section has a campground, picnic area, pavilion, boat launch, and lake access with a sandy beach.

== Fish species ==
Lady Lake is regularly stocked with brown trout, tiger trout, and rainbow trout.

== See also ==
- List of lakes of Saskatchewan
- Tourism in Saskatchewan
