= Preeceville =

Town in Saskatchewan, Canada

- Town
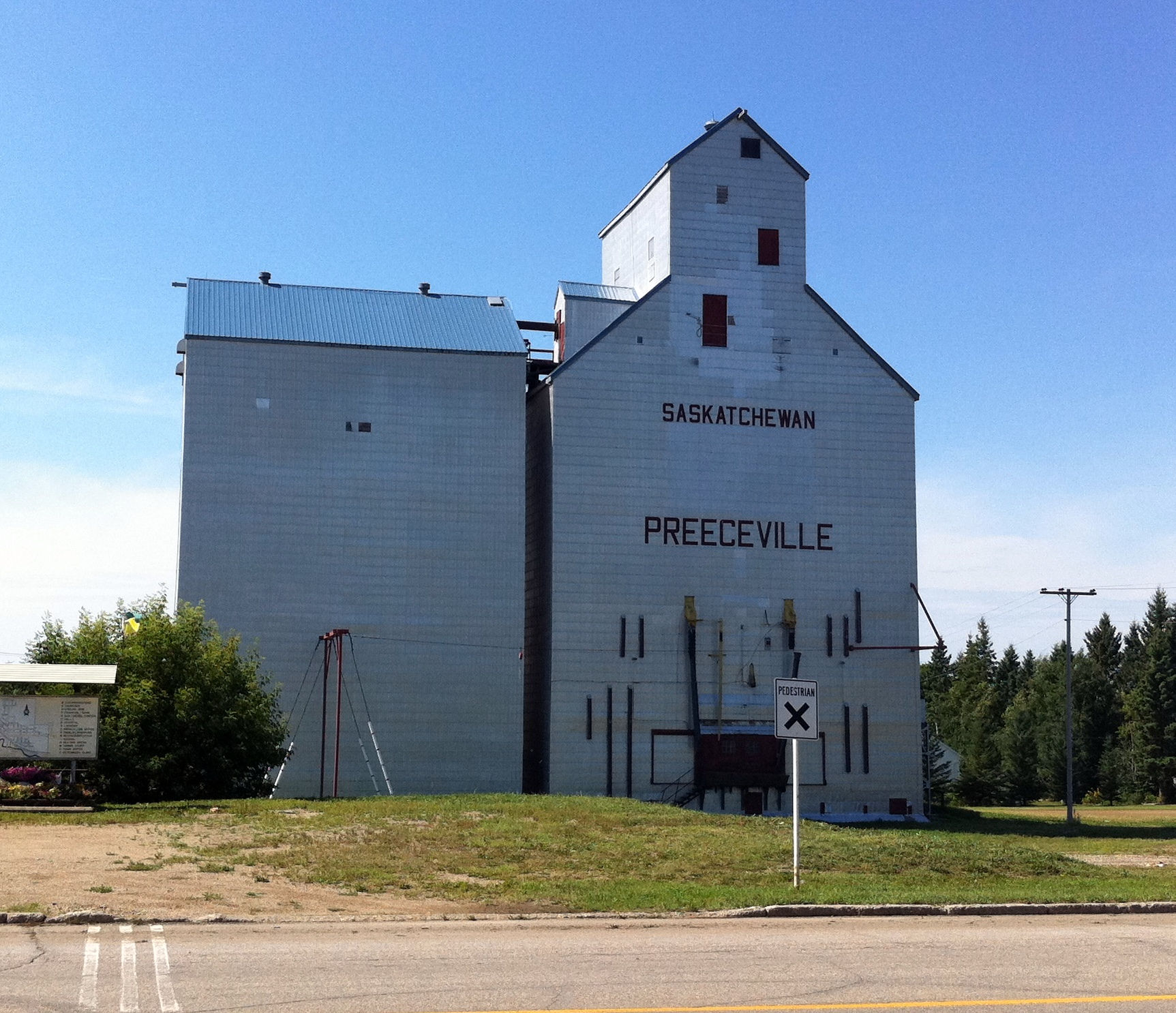
- The grain elevator in Preeceville

- Preeceville in Saskatchewan Preeceville (Canada)
- Coordinates: 51.9580222°N 102.6673164°W
- Country: Canada
- Province: Saskatchewan
- Census division: 9
- Rural municipality: Preeceville No. 334
- Post office Founded: 1912-03-01
- Incorporated (Village): 1912
- Incorporated (Town): 1947

Government
  - Mayor: Darin Newton
  - Administrator: Lorelei Karcha
  - Governing body: Preeceville Town Council

Area
  - Town: 3.06 km^{2} (1.18 sq mi)
- Elevation: 520 m (1,700 ft)

Population (2016)
  - Urban: 1,125
  - Urban density: 368.2/km^{2} (954/sq mi)
- Time zone: UTC-6 (CST)
  - Summer (DST): UTC-6 (CST)
- Postal code: S0A 3B0
- Area codes: 306/639
- Highways: Highway 9 / Highway 47 / Highway 49
- Waterways: Assiniboine River
- Website: Official Website

Preeceville is a town in Saskatchewan, Canada. The town is 10 kilometres (6.2 mi) west of Sturgis and 99 kilometres (62 mi) north of Yorkton at the junction of Highway 49, Highway 47, Highway 9 and near Highway 755.

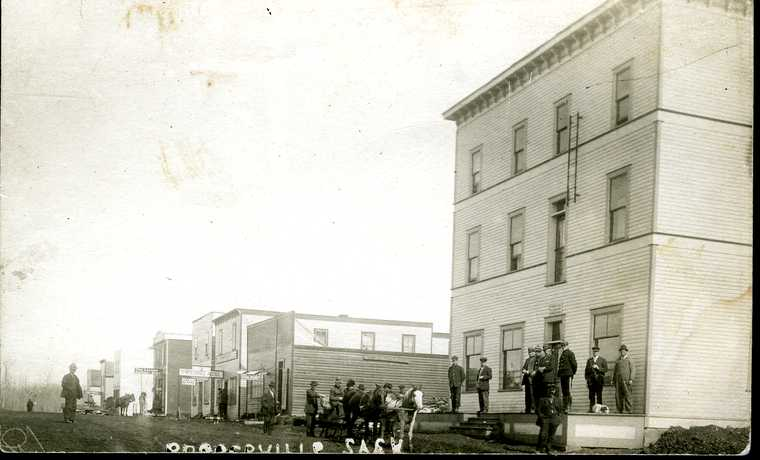
Preeceville (Circa 1909)

== History ==
Settlement in the Preeceville region dates back to fur traders who came to the upper Assiniboine region after explorer David Thompson mapped the area in 1796. Later, ranchers followed the trails left by fur traders and Indigenous peoples, leading to the earliest settlement of the area.

Preeceville was officially established as a village in 1912, the same year the Canadian National Railway arrived, further driving settlement in the region.

The town is named for the Preece family, who set up a homestead where the town now stands in 1905.

== Demographics ==
In the 2021 Census of Population conducted by Statistics Canada, Preeceville had a population of 1,062 living in 492 of its 570 total private dwellings, a change of −5.6% from its 2016 population of 1,125. With a land area of 2.86 square kilometres (1.10 sq mi), it had a population density of 371.3/km^{2} (961.7/sq mi) in 2021.

Canada census – Preeceville community profile

	2021	2011
Population	1,062 (-5.6% from 2016)	1,070 (1.9% from 2006)
Land area	2.86 km^{2} (1.10 sq mi)	3.06 km^{2} (1.18 sq mi)
Population density	371.8/km^{2} (963/sq mi)	350.2/km^{2} (907/sq mi)
Median age	51.6 (M: 48.4, F: 54.4)	53.4 (M: 49.4, F: 57.8)
Private dwellings	495 (total)	579 (total)
Median household income

References: 2021 2011

== Transportation ==
The community is served by Preeceville Airport, which is located 1 nautical mile (1.9 km) southeast.

== See also ==
- List of communities in Saskatchewan
- List of towns in Saskatchewan
