= Profitis Ilias Greek Orthodox Church =

Church in Saskatchewan, Canada

Coordinates: 52.231°N 102.621°W

- Προφήτης Ηλίας
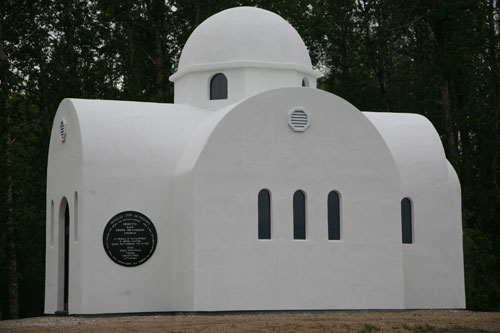
- Greek Orthodox church in Saskatchewan, Canada
- Profitis Ilias Greek Orthodox Church
- Location: Near Endeavour, Saskatchewan, Canada
- Country: Canada
- Denomination: Greek Orthodox Church
- Website: https://prophetelias.ca/

History
- Status: Church
- Founded: 2008
- Founder: Ilias Barlas
- Dedication: Prophet Elias (Elijah)
- Dedicated: July 20, 2009

Architecture
- Functional status: Active

Administration
- Archdiocese: Greek Orthodox Archdiocese of Canada

Clergy
- Priest: Father Michael Michael (2009 dedication)

Profitis Ilias Greek Orthodox Church is a Greek Orthodox church located outside Endeavour, Saskatchewan, Canada, and dedicated to the Prophet Elias. It was built in 2008 on the private property of Ilias Barlas.

There is a traditional Greek celebration every July 20 to celebrate Profitis Ilias memory at the church. On July 20, 2009, the Greek Orthodox Church celebrated the life of Profitis Ilias (The Prophet Elias or Elijah). On this special occasion, Ilias Barlas, family and friends christened this small church and dedicated it to the memory of Profitis Ilias. The service was conducted by Father Michael Michael of Koimisis Tis Theotokou Greek Orthodox Church, Saskatoon SK.

Profitis Ilias Dedication Stone

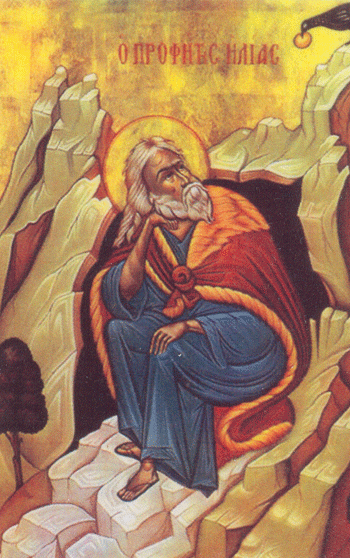
Prophet Elias

Dedication: Because the clouds of flying miracles. Because the mystery of lights that show us the dream.
