= Hudson's Bay =

Hudson's Bay may refer to:

== Places ==
- Hudson Bay, a very large bay in northern Canada

== Brands and enterprises ==
- Hudson Bay Capital Management, American investment management firm headquartered in Greenwich, Connecticut.
- Hudson's Bay Company, the oldest surviving corporation in Canada, founded in 1670
  - Hudson's Bay (department store), a retail subsidiary of the Hudson's Bay Company
- Hudson's Bay point blanket wool blanket traded by the Hudson's Bay Company in exchange for beaver pelts.

== Art, entertainment, and media ==
- Hudson's Bay (film), a 1941 American film
- Hudson's Bay (TV series), a 1959 Western television series

== Other ==
- Hudson's Bay (HBC vessel), operated by the HBC from 1689 to 1697, see Hudson's Bay Company vessels

== See also ==
- Hudson Bay (disambiguation)
