= Hudson Bay Airport =

Airport in Saskatchewan, Canada

- IATA: YHB; ICAO: CYHB

Summary
- Airport type: Public
- Operator: Ministry of Highways & Infrastructure
- Location: RM of Hudson Bay No. 394, near Hudson Bay, Saskatchewan
- Time zone: CST (UTC−06:00)
- Elevation AMSL: 1,178 ft / 359 m
- Coordinates: 52°49′06″N 102°18′40″W
- Website: Town of Hudson Bay

Map
- Location in Saskatchewan CYHB (Canada)

Runways
Direction	Length		Surface
Direction	ft	m	Surface
06/24	5,001	1,524	Asphalt
- Sources: Canada Flight Supplement

Hudson Bay Airport (IATA: YHB, ICAO: CYHB) is located 4 nautical miles (7.4 km; 4.6 mi) south-east of Hudson Bay, Saskatchewan, Canada.

Although no commercial airlines use the Hudson Bay Airport, many people fly there for recreation. It is also used as a base for the provinces Conair Firecat (Grunman G89) water bombers. The water bomber facilities include an 8,000 gallon fire retardant tank, two 10,000 gallon water storage tanks and 10,000 gallon fuel tanks.

In 2011, the provincial government funded repaving of the main runway and constructing a new taxi-way (resulting in the closure of the 2000 ft smaller runway 10/28); these upgrades permit the water bomber fleet that use the airport to expand to also include the Convair 580 and Turbo Aero Commanders.

== See also ==
- List of airports in Saskatchewan
