= Kennedy, Saskatchewan =

Village in Saskatchewan, Canada

Kennedy
- Village
- Village of Kennedy
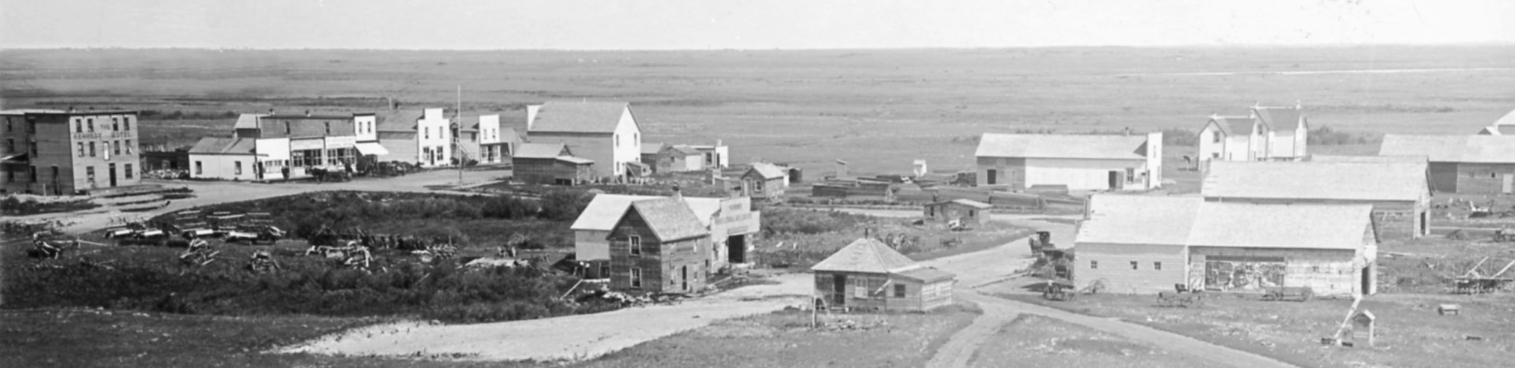
- Kennedy c. 1911

- Location of Kennedy in Saskatchewan Kennedy (Canada)
- Coordinates: 50.014°N 102.346°W
- Country: Canada
- Province: Saskatchewan
- Region: Southeast
- Census division: 1
- Rural Municipality: Wawken No. 93
- Post office Founded: August 1, 1904
- Incorporated (Village): November 5, 1907

Government
  - Type: Municipal
  - Governing body: Kennedy Village Council
  - Mayor: Brendon Dayle
  - Administrator: Jennifer McMillan
  - MP: Robert Kitchen
  - MLA: Dan D'Autremont

Area
  - Total: 1.60 km^{2} (0.62 sq mi)

Population (2016)
  - Total: 214
  - Density: 138.6/km^{2} (359/sq mi)
- Time zone: UTC-6 (CST)
- Postal code: S0G 2R0
- Area code: 306
- Highways: Highway 48
- Railways: None
- Website: Village of Kennedy

Kennedy (2016 population: 216) is a village in the Canadian province of Saskatchewan within the Rural Municipality of Wawken No. 93 and Census Division No. 1. The village lies just south of Highway 48, about 3 kilometres (1.9 mi) west of Highway 9.

Kennedy is home to the Moose Mountain Pro Rodeo which takes place every year on the third weekend in July. A post office (Canada post), bar/restaurant, and a K-8 school exist. There are two parks; one is located on schoolgrounds and one by the campgrounds.

== History ==
Kennedy incorporated as a village on November 5, 1907.

== Demographics ==
Population history (1981–2016)
Year	Pop.	±%
1981	275	—
1986	305	+10.9%
1991	296	−3.0%
1996	231	−22.0%
2001	243	+5.2%
2006	187	−23.0%
2011	241	+28.9%
2016	216	−10.4%
Source: Statistics Canada via Saskatchewan Bureau of Statistics

In the 2021 Census of Population conducted by Statistics Canada, Kennedy had a population of 232 living in 115 of its 131 total private dwellings, a change of 7.4% from its 2016 population of 216. With a land area of 1.57 km^{2} (0.61 sq mi), it had a population density of 147.8/km^{2} (382.7/sq mi) in 2021.

In the 2016 Census of Population, the Village of Kennedy recorded a population of 216 living in 103 of its 143 total private dwellings, a −11.6% change from its 2011 population of 241. With a land area of 1.56 km^{2} (0.60 sq mi), it had a population density of 138.5/km^{2} (358.6/sq mi) in 2016.

== See also ==
- List of communities in Saskatchewan
- List of villages in Saskatchewan
