= Rural Municipality of Preeceville No. 334 =

Rural municipality in Saskatchewan, Canada

Preeceville No. 334
- Rural municipality
- Rural Municipality of Preeceville No. 334

- Location of the RM of Preeceville No. 334 in Saskatchewan
- Coordinates: 52.029°N 102.630°W
- Country: Canada
- Province: Saskatchewan
- Census division: 9
- SARM division: 4
- Formed: January 1, 1913

Government
  - Reeve: Richard Pristie
  - Governing body: RM of Preeceville No. 334 Council
  - Administrator: Lisa Peterson
  - Office location: Preeceville

Area (2016)
  - Land: 1,394.5 km^{2} (538.4 sq mi)

Population (2016)
  - Total: 919
  - Density: 0.7/km^{2} (1.8/sq mi)
- Time zone: CST
  - Summer (DST): CST
- Area codes: 306 and 639

The Rural Municipality of Preeceville No. 334 (2016 population: 919) is a rural municipality (RM) in the Canadian province of Saskatchewan within Census Division No. 9 and SARM Division No. 4.

== History ==
The RM of Preeceville No. 334 incorporated as a rural municipality on January 1, 1913.

== Geography ==
=== Communities and localities ===
The following urban municipalities are surrounded by the RM.

Towns

- Preeceville
- Sturgis

Villages

- Endeavour

The following unincorporated communities are within the RM.

Organized hamlets

- Ketchen
- Usherville

Localities

- Hassan
- Hinchliffe
- Lady Lake

== Demographics ==
Population history (1981–2016)
Year	Pop.	±%
1981	1,563	—
1986	1,552	−0.7%
1991	1,300	−16.2%
1996	1,202	−7.5%
2001	1,092	−9.2%
2006	960	−12.1%
2011	859	−10.5%
2016	919	+7.0%
Source: Statistics Canada via Saskatchewan Bureau of Statistics

In the 2021 Census of Population conducted by Statistics Canada, the RM of Preeceville No. 334 had a population of 966 living in 379 of its 489 total private dwellings, a change of 5.1% from its 2016 population of 919. With a land area of 1,368.92 km^{2} (528.54 sq mi), it had a population density of 0.7/km^{2} (1.8/sq mi) in 2021.

In the 2016 Census of Population, the RM of Preeceville No. 334 recorded a population of 919 living in 374 of its 499 total private dwellings, a 7% change from its 2011 population of 859. With a land area of 1,394.5 km^{2} (538.4 sq mi), it had a population density of 0.7/km^{2} (1.7/sq mi) in 2016.

== Attractions ==
- Lady Lake Regional Park
- Profitis Ilias Greek Orthodox Church
- Sturgis Station House Museum
- Sturgis & District Regional Park

== Government ==
The RM of Preeceville No. 334 is governed by an elected municipal council and an appointed administrator that meets on the second Monday of every month. The reeve of the RM is Richard Pristie while its administrator is Lisa Peterson. The RM's office is located in Preeceville.

== Transportation ==
- Saskatchewan Highway 9
- Saskatchewan Highway 47
- Saskatchewan Highway 49
- Saskatchewan Highway 753
- Canadian National Railway
  - Endeavour station
  - Sturgis Station

== See also ==
- List of rural municipalities in Saskatchewan
