= Ebenezer, Saskatchewan =

Village in Saskatchewan, Canada

Ebenezer
- Village
- Village of Ebenezer
- Location of Ebenezer in Saskatchewan Ebenezer (Canada)
- Coordinates: 51°22′11″N 102°26′54″W
- Country: Canada
- Province: Saskatchewan
- Region: East-central
- Rural municipality: Orkney No. 244
- Post office Founded: 1885
- Incorporated (Village): 1948

Government
  - Type: Municipal
  - Governing body: Ebenezer Village Council
  - Mayor: Braden Ferris
  - Administrator: Joyce Palagian
  - MLA: Greg Ottenbreit
  - MP: Cathay Wagantall

Area
  - Land: 0.62 km^{2} (0.24 sq mi)
- Elevation: 484 m (1,588 ft)

Population (2016)
  - Total: 185
  - Density: 297.5/km^{2} (771/sq mi)
- Time zone: UTC-6 (CST)
- Postal code: S0A 0T0
- Area code: 306
- Highways: Highway 9
- Railways: Canadian National Railway
- Website: https://www.villageofebenezersk.com/

Ebenezer (2016 population: 185) is a village in the Canadian province of Saskatchewan within the Rural Municipality of Orkney No. 244 and Census Division No. 9. The village is located 18 kilometres (11 mi) north of the city of Yorkton, on Highway 9.

== History ==
The first settlers arrived between 1885 and 1887, mostly German-speaking Protestants who named the village after the location of Eben-Ezer mentioned in the Books of Samuel of the Old Testament. Ebenezer incorporated as a village on July 1, 1948. High speed internet became available in 2015 in this hamlet.

== Demographics ==
Population history (1981–2016)
Year	Pop.	±%
1981	164	—
1986	192	+17.1%
1991	182	−5.2%
1996	166	−8.8%
2001	147	−11.4%
2006	139	−5.4%
2011	175	+25.9%
2016	185	+5.7%
Source: Statistics Canada via Saskatchewan Bureau of Statistics

In the 2021 Census of Population conducted by Statistics Canada, Ebenezer had a population of 188 living in 77 of its 80 total private dwellings, a change of 1.6% from its 2016 population of 185. With a land area of 0.6 km^{2} (0.23 sq mi), it had a population density of 313.3/km^{2} (811.5/sq mi) in 2021.

In the 2016 Census of Population, the Village of Ebenezer recorded a population of 185 living in 73 of its 79 total private dwellings, a 5.4% change from its 2011 population of 175. With a land area of 0.62 km^{2} (0.24 sq mi), it had a population density of 298.4/km^{2} (772.8/sq mi) in 2016.

== See also ==
- List of villages in Saskatchewan
