= Hudson Bay Regional Park =

Park in Saskatchewan, Canada

- Location within Saskatchewan Location within Canada
- Location: Saskatchewan
- Nearest city: Hudson Bay
- Coordinates: 52°49′40″N 102°22′17″W
- Area: 364.2 ha (900 acres)
- Governing body: Saskatchewan Regional Parks Association

Hudson Bay Regional Park is a regional park in the Canadian province of Saskatchewan. It is located on the south side of the town of Hudson Bay in the RM of Hudson Bay No. 394 along the shores of the Red Deer River. The park is the site of a North West Company fur trading fort called Fort Red Deer River that was built in 1790. About 14 kilometres (8.7 mi) downstream, near Erwood, was a Hudson's Bay Company trading post that was built in 1757.

Hudson Bay Regional Park is composed about 900 acres of land split up between the main park on the south side of the town of Hudson Bay and along the Red Deer River and three former provincial recreation sites, Ruby Lake, Dagg Creek, and Greenbush River. The park is in the Porcupine Provincial Forest and at the edge of a pre-historic glacial lake called Lake Agassiz.

== Hudson Bay Park ==
The main part of the park is located at the junction of Fir, Red Deer, and Etomami Rivers and features camping, golfing, baseball diamonds, picnicking, hiking, fishing, and cross-country ski trails. The park also features Red Deer Downs, a natural amphitheatre known as "The Bowl", and a gun range.

The campground has over 40 sites for camping (some with electricity), washrooms, showers, potable water, and a sani-dump station.

The golf course, Hudson Bay Golf Club, is a 9-hole, grass green course. It was built in 1971 and is a par 35 with 2,617 yards.

== Recreation sites ==
Besides the main Hudson Bay park area, there are three recreation sites that are part of the regional park. A fourth site at Saginas Lake became part of the Porcupine Hills Provincial Park in 2018.

- Dagg Creek Recreation Site (52.6417°N 102.4025°W) is located south of the town of Hudson Bay along Highway 9 and near the confluence of the Etomami and Pepaw Rivers. There is a small campground there and a picnic site.
- Ruby Lake Recreation Site (52.9601°N 102.3491°W), also known simply as Ruby Beach, is located on the eastern shore of Ruby Lake, about 15 kilometres (9.3 mi) north of Hudson Bay, just off Highway 9 at the southern side of the Pasquia Hills. There is a picnic area, beach, boat launch, and small campground consisting of nine campsites.
- Greenbush River Recreation Site (52.8492°N 102.6875°W) is located on Greenbush River along Highway 3, about 26 kilometres (16 mi) west of Hudson Bay.

== Fort Red Deer River ==
Fort Red Deer River or Fort Rivière la Biche was a North West Company trading post on the Red Deer River near the town of Hudson Bay. It was founded in 1794 by Hugh McGillis, and its date of closure is uncertain. Elizabeth Losey places it at the mouth of the Etomami River in the Hudson Bay Regional Park. There is a provincial marker at the ball diamonds marking the spot.

In 1774, Matthew Cocking described two trading posts on the Red Deer River. The Lower Settlement was located on a flat just upriver of Red Deer Lake, while the Upper Settlement was located 60 miles upriver of the lake. The Upper Settlement likely became Fort Red Deer River. Ruins from both settlements were found by Joseph Tyrrell in 1889.

The great explorer, Sir Alexander Mackenzie, considered this fort to be one of the three chief trading posts of the Lake Manitoba district. The trading post sat at the approximate intersection of the Assiniboine tribes to the south, and the Swampy Cree tribes to the north.

== Flora and fauna ==
With the park situated in and around the Porcupine and Pasquia Provincial Forests there are lots of wildlife viewing opportunities. There are over 350 species of birds, white-tailed deer, elk, moose, black bears, muskrats, woodland caribou, cougars, and beavers.

This region of Saskatchewan features 21 different species of orchids, seven of which are endangered. The ram's head lady slipper is only found in four different locations in Saskatchewan and one of them is at Hudson Bay Regional Park.

== See also ==
- List of protected areas of Saskatchewan
- Tourism in Saskatchewan
- North American fur trade
- Porcupine Hills
