= Usherville =

Hamlet in Saskatchewan, Canada

Coordinates: 52°13′54″N 102°39′27″W

Usherville is a hamlet in the Canadian province of Saskatchewan. It is in the western shore of Lilian Lake in the Rural Municipality of Preeceville No. 334.

== Demographics ==
In the 2021 Census of Population conducted by Statistics Canada, Usherville had a population of 5 living in 3 of its 15 total private dwellings, a change of inf% from its 2016 population of . With a land area of 0.12 km^{2} (0.046 sq mi), it had a population density of 41.7/km^{2} (107.9/sq mi) in 2021.

== See also ==
- List of hamlets in Saskatchewan
