= Lady Lake (Vancouver Island) =

- Location within Vancouver Island
- Location: Vancouver Island, British Columbia
- Coordinates: 49°42′36.3″N 125°18′48.0″W
- Lake type: Natural lake
- Basin countries: Canada

Lady Lake is a lake located on Vancouver Island on Forbidden Plateau, an expansion of Browns River.

== See also ==
- List of lakes of British Columbia
