= Lady Lake (Minnesota) =

Lake in the state of Minnesota, United States

- Location within Minnesota
- Location: Todd County, Minnesota
- Coordinates: 45°51′6″N 94°45′10″W
- Type: lake

Lady Lake is a lake in Todd County, in the U.S. state of Minnesota.

Lady Lake was named for state flower of Minnesota, the lady's slipper (Cypripedium reginae).

== See also ==
- List of lakes in Minnesota
