= Rhein, Saskatchewan =

Village in Saskatchewan, Canada

Coordinates: 51°21′14″N 102°11′41″W

Location of Rhein in Saskatchewan

Rhein (pronounced 'Ryan') (2016 population: 170) is a village in the Canadian province of Saskatchewan within the Rural Municipality of Wallace No. 243 and Census Division No. 9. It is located at the intersection of Highways 309, 637, and 726.

== History ==
Rhein incorporated as a village on March 10, 1913.

== Demographics ==
Population history (1981–2016)
Year	Pop.	±%
1981	271	—
1986	255	−5.9%
1991	218	−14.5%
1996	197	−9.6%
2001	175	−11.2%
2006	161	−8.0%
2011	158	−1.9%
2016	170	+7.6%
2021	149	−12.4%
Source: Statistics Canada via Saskatchewan Bureau of Statistics

In the 2021 Census of Population conducted by Statistics Canada, Rhein had a population of 149 living in 65 of its 81 total private dwellings, a change of −12.4% from its 2016 population of 170. With a land area of 1.08 km^{2} (0.42 sq mi), it had a population density of 138.0/km^{2} (357.3/sq mi) in 2021.

In the 2016 Census of Population, the Village of Rhein recorded a population of 170 living in 71 of its 81 total private dwellings, a 7.1% change from its 2011 population of 158. With a land area of 1.09 km^{2} (0.42 sq mi), it had a population density of 156.0/km^{2} (403.9/sq mi) in 2016.

== Economy ==
In 1928, 1,640 acres of cannabis were grown in Canada, with 200 of those acres located in Rhein.

== Notable residents ==
- Arnie Weinmeister — one of only two Canadians to be elected to the Pro Football Hall of Fame.

== See also ==
- List of communities in Saskatchewan
- List of villages in Saskatchewan
