= Endeavour, Saskatchewan =

Village in Saskatchewan, Canada

Endeavour
- Village
- Village of Endeavour
- Location of Endeavour in Saskatchewan Endeavour (Canada)
- Coordinates: 52.1582°N 102.6534°W
- Country: Canada
- Province: Saskatchewan
- Region: East-central
- Census division: 9
- Rural municipality: Preeceville No. 334
- Post office Founded: December 1, 1915

Government
  - Type: Municipal
  - Governing body: Endeavour Village Council
  - Mayor: James German
  - Administrator: Kathleen Ambrose

Area
  - Total: 0.99 km^{2} (0.38 sq mi)

Population (2016)
  - Total: 65
  - Density: 65.7/km^{2} (170/sq mi)
- Time zone: UTC−6 (CST)
- Postal code: S0A 0W0
- Area code: 306
- Highways: Highway 9; Highway 759
- Railways: Via Rail
- Waterways: Lilian River

Endeavour (2016 population: 65) is a village in the Canadian province of Saskatchewan within the Rural Municipality of Preeceville No. 334 and Census Division No. 9. It is on the west bank of the Lilian River. The Endeavour railway station is served by Via Rail's Winnipeg–Churchill train, as well the village can be accessed via Highway 9.

== History ==
Endeavour incorporated as a village on April 29, 1953. The community, originally named Annette, was renamed Endeavour after the first attempted commercial passenger flight across the Atlantic in 1930.

== Demographics ==
Population history (1981–2016)
Year	Pop.	±%
1981	199	—
1986	191	−4.0%
1991	173	−9.4%
1996	173	+0.0%
2001	154	−11.0%
2006	118	−23.4%
2011	94	−20.3%
2016	65	−30.9%
Source: Statistics Canada via Saskatchewan Bureau of Statistics

In the 2021 Census of Population conducted by Statistics Canada, Endeavour had a population of 75 living in 42 of its 60 total private dwellings, a change of 15.4% from its 2016 population of 65. With a land area of 1 km^{2} (0.39 sq mi), it had a population density of 75.0/km^{2} (194.2/sq mi) in 2021.

In the 2016 Census of Population, the Village of Endeavour recorded a population of 65 living in 34 of its 45 total private dwellings, a −44.6% change from its 2011 population of 94. With a land area of 0.99 km^{2} (0.38 sq mi), it had a population density of 65.7/km^{2} (170.0/sq mi) in 2016.

== In pop-culture ==
A feature on Mars was named for the village: the crater Endeavour, which the rover Opportunity has been investigating since 2011.

Johnny Cash makes reference to Endeavour in his song 'The Girl in Saskatoon': "I left a little town a little south of Hudson Bay."

== See also ==
- List of communities in Saskatchewan
- List of villages in Saskatchewan
