= Sturgis, Saskatchewan =

Town in Saskatchewan, Canada

Sturgis
- Town
- Sturgis in Saskatchewan Sturgis (Canada)
- Coordinates: 51.938°N 102.54°W
- Country: Canada
- Province: Saskatchewan
- Census division: 9
- Rural municipality: Preeceville No. 334
- Post office Founded: 1908
- Incorporated (Village): 1912
- Incorporated (Town): 1951

Government
  - Type: Mayor-Council
  - Mayor: Dean Harris
  - Governing body: Sturgis Town Council

Area
  - Total: 3.41 km^{2} (1.32 sq mi)

Population (2011)
  - Total: 620
  - Density: 181.6/km^{2} (470/sq mi)
- Time zone: CST
- Postal code: S0A 4A0
- Area codes: 306 / 639
- Highways: Highway 9 / Highway 49
- Waterways: Assiniboine River; Lilian River
- Website: Town of Sturgis

Sturgis is a town of 620 people in east-central Saskatchewan, Canada. The Town of Sturgis is 95 kilometres (59 mi) north of Yorkton on Highway 9. It is located in the Assiniboine River valley near the Lakes and Woods region of the province.

The community was named for Sturgis, South Dakota, where Fred Clyde Brooks, the first postmaster, had been raised.

The Sturgis railway station receives scheduled Via Rail service.

== Demographics ==
In the 2021 Census of Population conducted by Statistics Canada, Sturgis had a population of 646 living in 300 of its 333 total private dwellings, a change of 0.3% from its 2016 population of 644. With a land area of 3.15 km^{2} (1.22 sq mi), it had a population density of 205.1/km^{2} (531.2/sq mi) in 2021.

In 2011, the median age of the population in Sturgis increased in 2001 to 51.2 years of age versus 49.7 in 2006. The median age of the division was 46.1 in 2011 and 38.2 for the province.

Canada census – Sturgis, Saskatchewan community profile

	2011
Population	620 (+7.8% from 2006)
Land area	3.41 km^{2} (1.32 sq mi)
Population density	181.6/km^{2} (470/sq mi)
Median age	51.2 (M: 49.8, F: 52.9)
Private dwellings	341 (total)
Median household income

References: 2011

== Economy ==
- Chamber of Commerce
- Sturgis Economic Development Corp
- Sturgis Tourist Information Booth

== Attractions ==
- Station House Museum
- Skating and Curling Rinks
- Sturgis & District Community Hall
- Sturgis Ski Hill
- Sturgis & District Regional Park

== Churches ==
- Grace United Church
- Kingdom Hall of Jehovah's Witnesses
- St. Patrick's Roman Catholic Church
- Evangelical Church
- Ukrainian Greek Orthodox Church

== Education ==
Sturgis is home to Sturgis Elementary School and Sturgis Composite High School a part of the Good Spirit School Division No. 204.

- Parkland Regional Library — Sturgis Branch
- The Kinette Club of Sturgis Nursery School
- Good Spirit School Division Band

== See also ==
- List of communities in Saskatchewan
- List of towns in Saskatchewan
