= Rural Municipality of Orkney No. 244 =

Rural municipality in Saskatchewan, Canada

Orkney No. 244
- Rural municipality
- Rural Municipality of Orkney No. 244
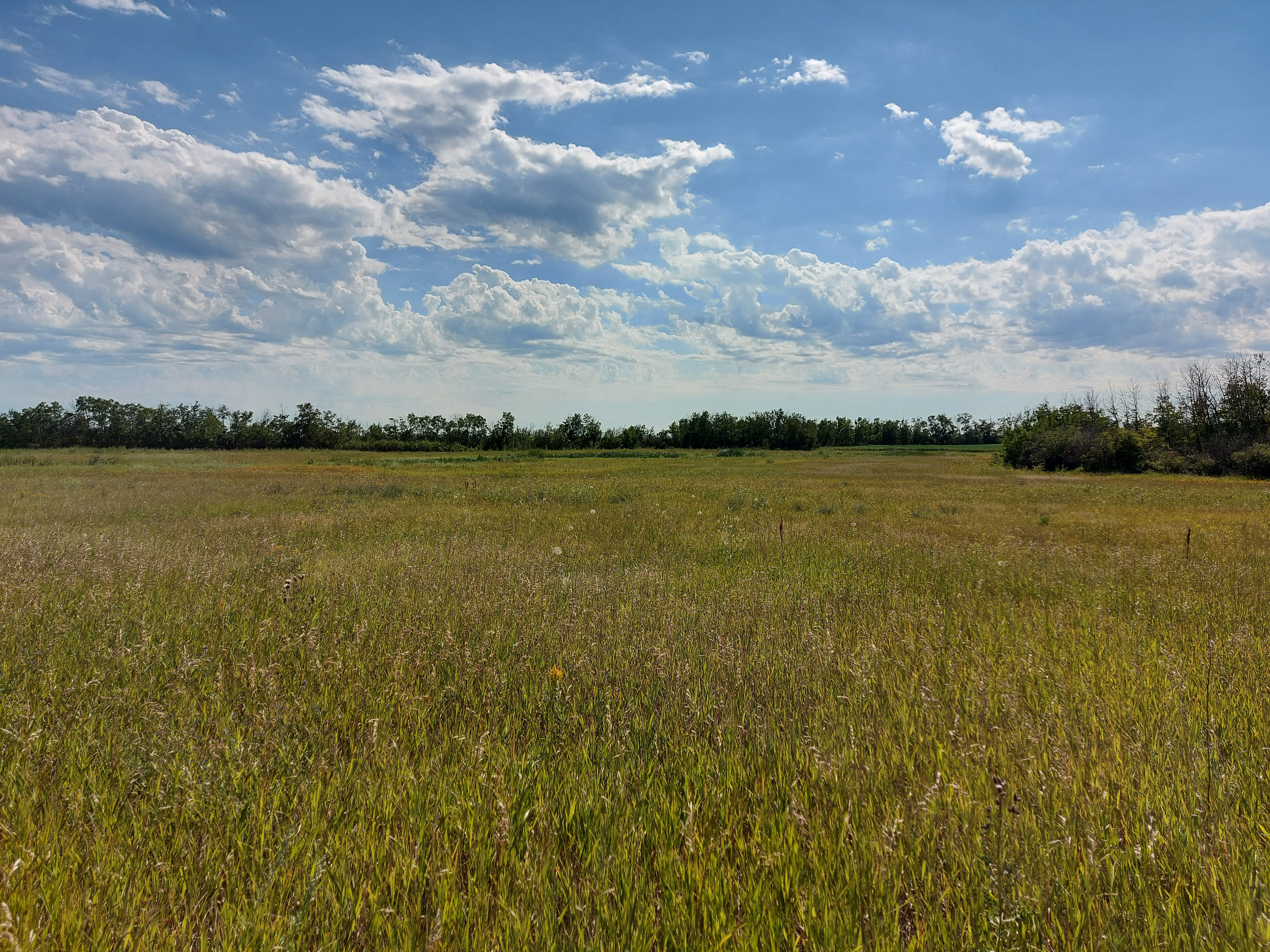
- A meadow in the RM

- Location of the RM of Orkney No. 244 in Saskatchewan
- Coordinates: 51.244°N 102.566°W
- Country: Canada
- Province: Saskatchewan
- Census division: 9
- SARM division: 4
- Formed: January 1, 1913

Government
  - Reeve: Randy Trost
  - Governing body: RM of Orkney No. 244 Council
  - Administrator: Clint Mauthe
  - Office location: Yorkton

Area (2016)
  - Land: 806.99 km^{2} (311.58 sq mi)

Population (2016)
  - Total: 1,875
  - Density: 2.3/km^{2} (6.0/sq mi)
- Time zone: UTC−6 (CST)
  - Summer (DST): CST
- Area codes: 306 and 639

The Rural Municipality of Orkney No. 244 (2016 population: 1,875) is a rural municipality (RM) in the Canadian province of Saskatchewan within Census Division No. 9 and SARM Division No. 4. It is located in the southeast portion of the province.

== History ==
The RM of Orkney No. 244 incorporated as a rural municipality on January 1, 1913.

== Geography ==
=== Communities and localities ===
The following urban municipalities are surrounded by the RM.

Cities

- Yorkton

Towns

- Springside

Villages

- Ebenezer

The following unincorporated communities are within the RM.

Localities

- Orcadia
- Willowbrook

== Demographics ==
Population history (1981–2016)
Year	Pop.	±%
1981	2,254	—
1986	2,094	−7.1%
1991	1,899	−9.3%
1996	1,810	−4.7%
2001	1,728	−4.5%
2006	1,721	−0.4%
2011	1,860	+8.1%
2016	1,875	+0.8%
Source: Statistics Canada via Saskatchewan Bureau of Statistics

In the 2021 Census of Population conducted by Statistics Canada, the RM of Orkney No. 244 had a population of 1,883 living in 756 of its 810 total private dwellings, a change of 0.4% from its 2016 population of 1,875. With a land area of 770.05 km^{2} (297.32 sq mi), it had a population density of 2.4/km^{2} (6.3/sq mi) in 2021.

In the 2016 Census of Population, the RM of Orkney No. 244 recorded a population of 1,875 living in 734 of its 796 total private dwellings, a 0.8% change from its 2011 population of 1,860. With a land area of 806.99 km^{2} (311.58 sq mi), it had a population density of 2.3/km^{2} (6.0/sq mi) in 2016.

== Government ==
The RM of Orkney No. 244 is governed by an elected municipal council and an appointed administrator that meets on the second Thursday of every month. The Reeve of the RM is Randy Trost while its Administrator is Bridgette Rushkewich. The RM's office is located in Yorkton.
