= Red Deer River (Manitoba) =

River in Western Canada

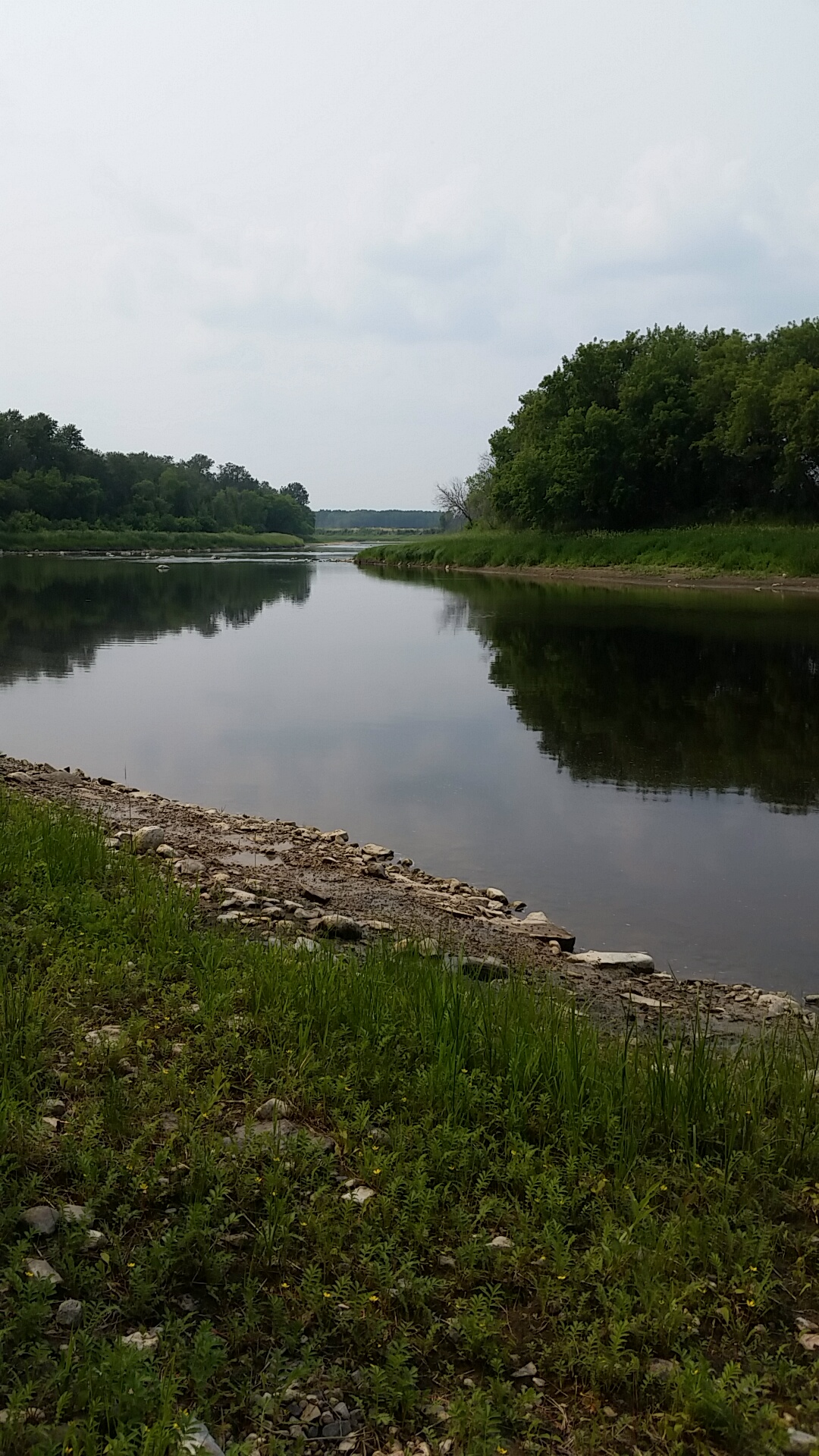
- The Red Deer River near Erwood, Saskatchewan

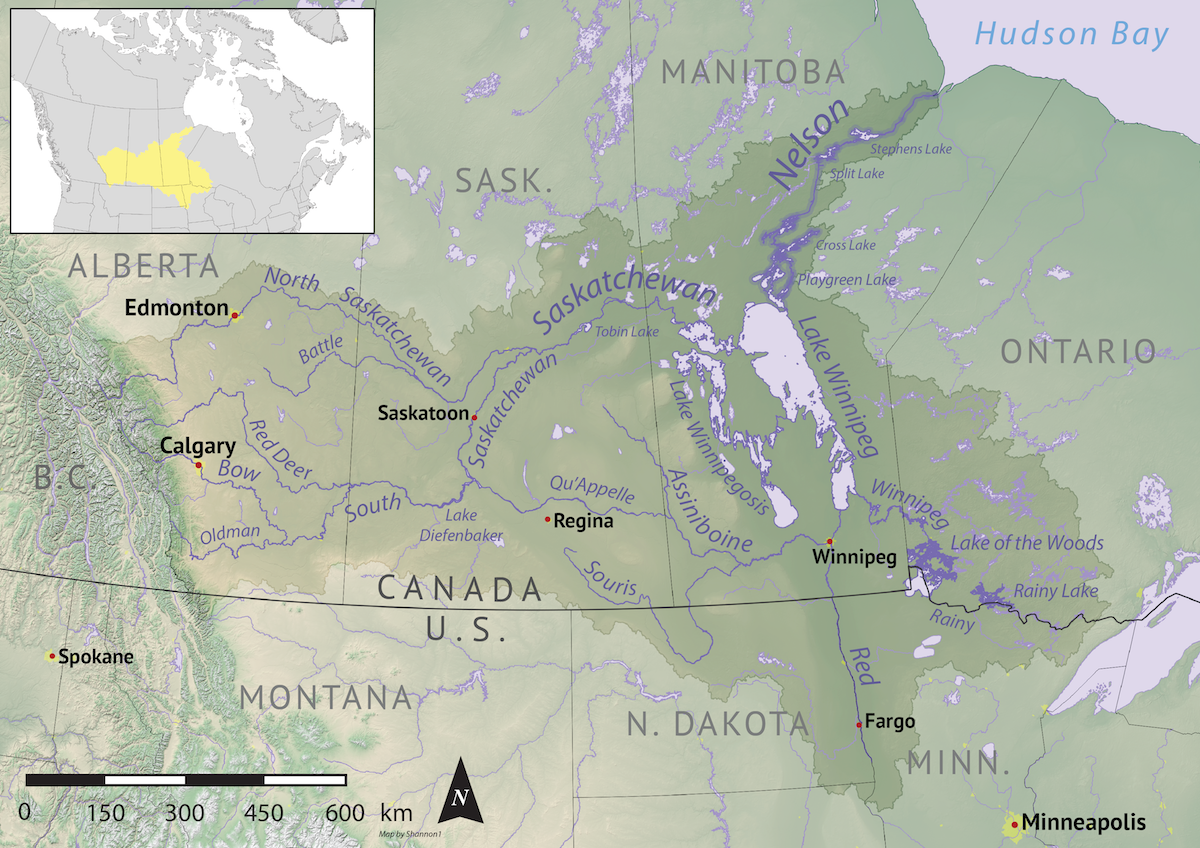
- Nelson River drainage basin

- Location of the mouth in Manitoba Red Deer River (Manitoba) (Canada)

Location
- Country: Canada
- Provinces: Manitoba; Saskatchewan

Physical characteristics
- Source: Nut Lake
  - coordinates: 52.4229°N 103.7009°W
  - elevation: 535 m (1,755 ft)
- Mouth: Dawson Bay on Lake Winnipegosis
  - coordinates: 52°53′42″N 101°00′41″W
  - elevation: 254 m (833 ft)
- Basin size: 11,000 km^{2} (4,200 sq mi)

Basin features
- River system: Nelson River drainage basin
- Tributaries
  - left: Fir River
  - right: Etomami River; Greenwater Creek

Red Deer River is a river in the Canadian provinces of Saskatchewan and Manitoba. It has its source at Nut Lake in east central Saskatchewan and from there, it flows east towards Manitoba where it empties into Dawson Bay of Lake Winnipegosis. To the north of Red Deer's basin is the Saskatchewan River, to the south-west is the upper Assiniboine River, and to the south-east is Swan River.

== Course ==
The Red Deer River begins at the north end of Nut Lake near Highway 349 and west of Porcupine Hills in east central Saskatchewan. From Nut Lake, it heads north past Greenwater Lake Provincial Park towards Pré-Ste-Marié. From there, near the junctions of Highways 679 and 773, it turns east towards the town of Hudson Bay and the Hudson Bay Regional Park, which is the site of a former North West Company fort named Fort Red Deer River. From Hudson Bay, it continues eastward and is the divide between the Pasquia Hills to the north and the Porcupine Hills to the south. It also passes through provincial forests such as Porcupine and Pasquia. From the forests and hills, it continues eastward into Manitoba where 13 kilometres (8.1 mi) past the border, it opens up into Red Deer Lake. The river continues from the east side of Red Deer Lake for about 16 kilometres (9.9 mi) until it empties into Dawson Bay of Lake Winnipegosis. Near the point where it empties into Dawson Bay, it crosses Highway 10, which is part of the Northern Woods and Water Route. That is also the location of Red Deer River Provincial Park.

In 1757, a Hudson's Bay Company fur trading post was established alongside the Red Deer River near the village of Erwood. In 1790, the North West Trading Company set up a trading post at the mouth of the Etomami River called Fort Red Deer River. On the river bank opposite the mouth of the Etomami River, there are the remains of another fort that is believed to be that of the American Fur Company.

== Tributaries ==
The source of the Red Deer River is Nut Lake, of which several creeks and rivers flow into, including Pipestone Creek and Prairie Butte Creek. As the river flows eastward, it is joined by several rivers and creeks. Much of the Pasquia and Porcupine Hills fall within the river's watershed.

Red Deer River tributaries from upstream to downstream, not including ones flowing into either Nut or Red Deer Lakes:

- Barrier River
  - Slough Creek
- Greenwater Creek
- Horsehide Creek
- Bannock Creek
- Prairie River
  - Valley Creek
- Salas Creek
- Greenbush River
  - Jumper Creek
- Fir River
  - Nonsuch Creek
- Etomami River
  - Piwei River
  - Shand Creek
  - Pepaw River
  - Boundary Creek
    - Bubbling Creek
- Willow Creek
- Smoking Tent Creek
- Lost River
- Rice River
  - Little Rice River
  - Baden Creek
- Sucker Creek

== Fish species ==
Several types of fish live in the river, including freshwater drum, brown bullhead, common carp, goldeye, northern pike, and brown trout.

== See also ==
- List of rivers of Manitoba
- List of rivers of Saskatchewan
- Hudson Bay drainage basin
