= Lady Lake, Saskatchewan =

Community in Saskatchewan, Canada

Lady Lake
- Hamlet
- Location of Lady Lake in Saskatchewan Lady Lake (Canada)
- Coordinates: 51°01′30″N 102°37′28″W
- Country: Canada
- Province: Saskatchewan

Area
  - Land: 0.33 km^{2} (0.13 sq mi)
- Elevation: 516 m (1,693 ft)

Population (2006)
  - Total: 25
  - Density: 76/km^{2} (200/sq mi)
- Time zone: CST

Lady Lake is a hamlet in the Canadian province of Saskatchewan. It is on Highway 9 and on the banks of the Lilian River. Lady Lake Regional Park is about 3 kilometres (1.9 mi) to the west.

== Demographics ==
In the 2021 Census of Population conducted by Statistics Canada, Lady Lake had a population of 20 living in 7 of its 9 total private dwellings, a change of 100% from its 2016 population of 10. With a land area of 0.34 km^{2} (0.13 sq mi), it had a population density of 58.8/km^{2} (152.4/sq mi) in 2021.

== See also ==
- List of communities in Saskatchewan
