= Hudson Bay, Saskatchewan =

Town in Saskatchewan, Canada

Hudson Bay Etomami
- Town
- Nickname: The Bay
- Motto: The Moose Capital of the World!
- Location of Hudson Bay in Saskatchewan Hudson Bay (Canada)
- Coordinates: 52.851°N 102.392°W
- Country: Canada
- Province: Saskatchewan
- Census division: No. 14
- Rural municipality: Hudson Bay No. 394
- Etamomi: 1907
- Hudson Bay Junction: 1909
- Hudson Bay: 1947

Government
  - Type: Municipal Governance
  - Mayor: Betty Lou Palko
  - Town Manager: Teresa Parkman
  - Governing body: Hudson Bay Town Council

Area
  - Total: 17.35 km^{2} (6.70 sq mi)

Population (2011)
  - Total: 1,504
  - Density: 86.7/km^{2} (225/sq mi)
- In town population
- Time zone: CST
- Postal code: S0E 0Y0
- Area code: 306
- Highways: Highway 3; Highway 9
- Waterways: Red Deer River
- Website: Official website

Hudson Bay is a town in the east-central part of the Canadian province of Saskatchewan, about 49 kilometres (30 mi) west of the Manitoba border. The town is surrounded by the Rural Municipality of Hudson Bay No. 394.

== History ==
In 1757, a Hudson's Bay Company fur trading post was established in the Hudson Bay District beside the Red Deer River. Ruins from the post have been found near the village of Erwood. In 1790, the North West Trading Company set up a trading post at the mouth of the Etomami River called Fort Red Deer River. Speculators think that a South Company's post was set up on the opposite mouth of the River, where there are remains of a second post unaccounted for.

Over the years a settlement grew and, in July 1907, an application was made to erect Etomami as a village; Etomami was a First Nations word that meant "a place that three rivers join". However, to establish a hamlet needed fifteen occupied dwelling houses. By August, the list was completed and the village was formed. Mr. B.F. Noble was the first "overseer" of the village. The post office was also established at that time. It was on the 100 block of Churchill Street. Then, in 1909, the Canadian Northern Railway Company chose the name Hudson Bay Junction and so the name was changed.

During the early years, many difficulties were encountered in trying to maintain the village. It was even suggested at one time that it be disorganized but, as time moved on, things improved and the town continued to grow. The town was incorporated in 1946 and at the first council meeting, which was held in 1947, the town's name was shortened by dropping "Junction".

The Hudson Bay School Building is a registered municipal heritage property. It was built in 1910 to house the composite school as a four-room schoolhouse. It was built out of cement block in a Georgian Classicism/American Colonial style. Today, the building houses the Hudson Bay Museum.

== Demographics ==
In the 2021 Census of Population conducted by Statistics Canada, Hudson Bay had a population of 1,403 living in 693 of its 782 total private dwellings, a change of −2.3% from its 2016 population of 1,436. With a land area of 17.38 km^{2} (6.71 sq mi), it had a population density of 80.7/km^{2} (209.1/sq mi) in 2021.

Canada census – Hudson Bay community profile

	2021	2011
Population	1,403 (-2.3% from 2016)	1,504 (-8.6% from 2006)
Land area	17.38 km^{2} (6.71 sq mi)	17.35 km^{2} (6.70 sq mi)
Population density	80.7/km^{2} (209/sq mi)	86.7/km^{2} (225/sq mi)
Median age	51.2 (M: 49.6, F: 54.4)
Private dwellings	782 (total) 693 (occupied)	799 (total)
Median household income	$62,000

References: 2021 2011

== Economy ==
Hudson Bay has a diverse economy based on forestry, agriculture, processing, and eco-tourism. Forestry has continued to be the major source of employment and economic generator over the years, and its community has shown itself to be capable of supporting existing world class industries in the production of plywood and oriented strand board. In 1979 Hudson Bay earned the title of Forestry Capital of Canada. In addition, with the abundance of wildlife in the area, it has also become known as the "Moose Capital of the World". The vast tracts of untouched wilderness enable visitors to enjoy year round recreational pursuits. The nutrient rich soils which surround Hudson Bay have enabled farmers to produce a wide range of crops on over 175,000 cultivated acres (710 km^{2}).

=== Wood products ===
Wizewood Products Ltd. established Canada's first waferboard plant in September 1961, this was taken over by MacMillan Bloedel and Powell River (Saskatchewan) Ltd. in 1965, followed by a $4 Million dollar expansion in 1968–69 making it the largest particle board complex in Canada. A $14.8 million expansion followed in 1983, and by 1995 the plant was operating as a joint venture between Macmillan Bloedel and Saskatchewan Forest Products Corporation (SFPC) under the name SaskFor. When SaskFor opened the new oriented strand board mill, the old waferboard plant was shut down. In 1999 Macmillan Bloedel bought-out its part taking over full control of SaskFor, that same year Macmillan Bloedel was taken over by Weyerhaeuser. Wood products continue to play an important role in the local economy with both Weyerhaeuser and C&C Wood Products operating within the area.

=== Agriculture ===
Alfalfa is grown within the valley. Then dehydrated, it yields over 10,000 tonnes of alfalfa pellets annually for local sales and export. Wheat, Barley, and Canola are also grown in the area.

=== Coal ===
On May 8, 2008, a major coal discovery by Goldsource Mines Inc. sparked a land rush for coal prospecting permits. There have been many successful drill programs by such companies as Saturn Minerals, Wescan Goldfields Inc., North American Gem, and Westcore Drilling.

=== Tourism ===
Renowned for its diverse natural landscapes, Hudson Bay is known for recreational snowmobiling, attracting tourists from across North America. In tandem with winter recreation, the local big-game hunting industry has expanded significantly, cementing the area's reputation as a key destination for outdoor winter sports.

Two kilometres south of town is the Hudson Bay Regional Park, which features a 9-hole golf course, camping, hiking, Red Deer Downs, a natural amphitheatre called "the Bowl", and a gun range. The park is along the Red Deer River at the junction of two other rivers, the Fir River and Etomami River.

== Transportation ==
Hudson Bay is accessible by road and air. The town is at the junction of Highways 3 (east and west) and 9 (north and south). The Canadian National Railway has three lines including the Bay Route to the Port of Churchill.

=== Highways ===
Highway 9, also known as "Saskota Flyway", runs from Hudson Bay south to Northgate at the border with North Dakota and north to the Manitoba border near The Pas. West from Hudson Bay, Highway 3 heads to the Alberta border passing through Prince Albert and to the east Highway 3 heads to the border with Manitoba.

=== Railways ===
Hudson Bay is a major railway junction with the railway running in three different directions. Via Rail's Winnipeg–Churchill train provides scheduled passenger service at the Hudson Bay railway station.

Services
- Preceding station	Via Rail	Following station
  The Pas toward Churchill	Winnipeg–Churchill	Reserve toward Winnipeg
  Former services
  Preceding station	Canadian National Railway	Following station
  Veillardville toward North Battleford	North Battleford – Winnipeg via Swan River and Hallboro	Erwood toward Winnipeg
  Akosane toward Arborfield	Hudson Bay Junction – Arborfield via Chelan	Terminus
  Akosane toward Regina	Regina – Hudson Bay Junction	Terminus
  Wachee toward Flin Flon	Hudson Bay Junction – Flin Flon	Terminus

=== Airport ===
Hudson Bay Airport provides service for charter and local aircraft and serves a water bomber base for forest protection. The airport, with a 5,000-foot runway and a 2,000-foot cross wind runway is able to accommodate almost any size of aircraft. A beacon and lights allow for night landing.

== Education ==
There is one public school in the town of Hudson Bay, Hudson Bay Community School. It serves all the children of the town and surrounding areas. HBCS is a K-12 school. The enrolment is roughly 385 children.

The HBCH/HBCS Riders football team have made it to 13 provincial final games in 6-man and 9-man football, most notably their six straight 9-man finals appearances in the late 80s-90s.

== Clubs and organizations ==
Hudson Bay has a number of established groups whose mandates are to provide cultural and artistic opportunities for the residents of Hudson Bay and District.

The Hudson Bay Allied Arts Council is very active in bringing professional performing artists to the Community.

The forest, rivers, and lakes surrounding Hudson Bay provide inspirations for the members of the Hudson Bay Art Club. The active club organizes classes by professional artists for adults wishing to hone their skills and acquire new techniques.

Choral groups and instrumental ensembles from Stewart Hawke Elementary School consistently bring home trophies from the district musical festival. Both the elementary and high school have active drama clubs which attend Provincial adjudications. The High School has a well-equipped fine arts wing which houses its drama area and stage and its arts department.

Hudson Bay's active volunteer network provides a wide variety of cultural and artistic activities with the support of the Town of Hudson Bay and the School Division.

The Hudson Bay Economic Development and Tourism Committee is appointed by the Councils of the town of Hudson Bay, the Rural Municipality of Hudson Bay #394 and the Hudson Bay Chamber of Commerce. The purpose of the Committee is to provide aid to local economic opportunities, striving to renew and revitalize the economic interest of the community and to examine and investigate all alternatives that are available. The Committee keeps an up-to-date list of local business opportunities as well as a current list of business / office space and industrial sites available.

Service Clubs include: Rotary Club, Lions Club, Knights of Columbus, Masons, Elks and Royal Purple, Royal Canadian Legion, Legion Ladies Auxiliary, and Health Care Auxiliary. Other organizations focused on the youth in this area are: 4-H, Beavers, Cubs, AWANA, Scouts, and Army Cadets.

== Notable people ==
- Grant Jennings, ice hockey player
- Kalsey Kulyk, country music singer and songwriter
- Trent Yawney, ice hockey player and coach

== See also ==
- List of communities in Saskatchewan
- List of towns in Saskatchewan
