= Assiniboine River =

River in Western Canada

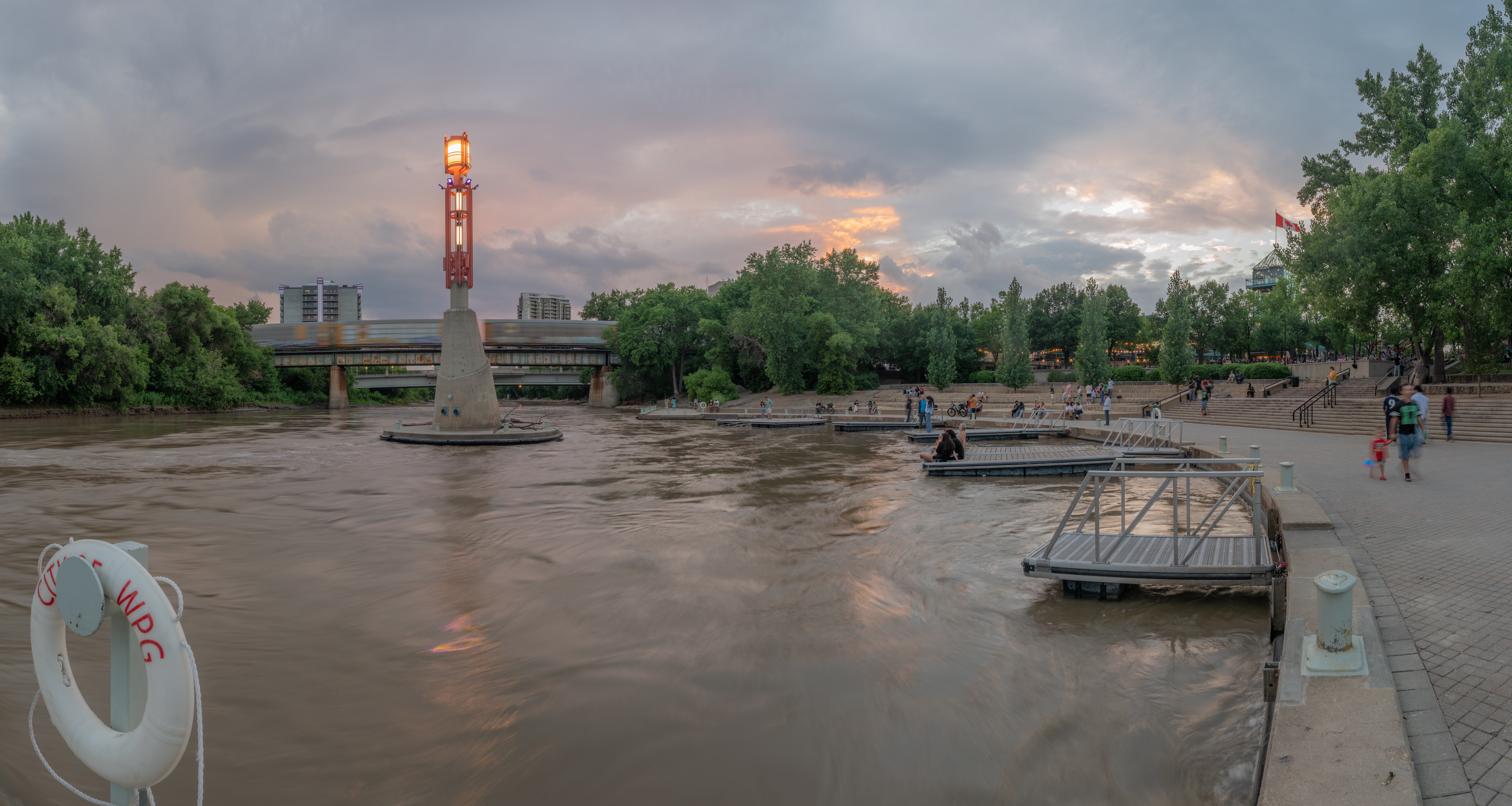
- The Assiniboine River near its confluence with the Red River, at The Forks in Winnipeg

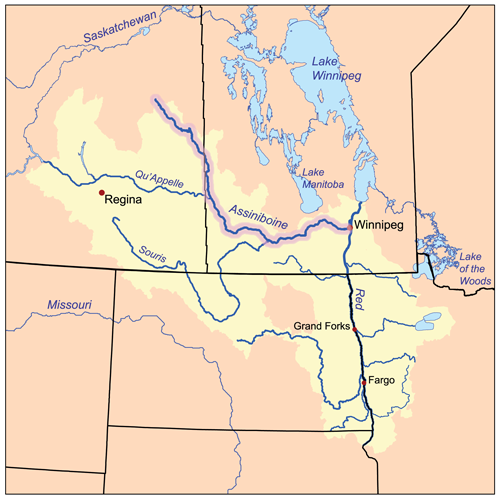
- Red River drainage basin, with the Assiniboine River highlighted

- River mouth in Manitoba Assiniboine River (Canada)

Location
- Country: Canada
- Provinces: Saskatchewan; Manitoba

Physical characteristics
- Source: Windy Lake east of Kelvington
  - location: Saskatchewan
  - coordinates: 52°18′15″N 103°06′01″W
  - elevation: 640 m (2,100 ft)
- Mouth: Red River
  - location: The Forks in Winnipeg, Manitoba
  - coordinates: 49°53′09″N 97°07′41″W
  - elevation: 230 m (750 ft)
- Length: 1,070 km (660 mi)
- Basin size: 182,000 km^{2} (70,000 sq mi)
- Discharge
  - average: 45 m^{3}/s (1,600 cu ft/s)

Basin features
- Progression: Red River → Lake Winnipeg → Nelson River → Hudson Bay
- River system: Red River

The Assiniboine River (/əˈsɪnɪbɔɪn/ ə-SIN-ih-boyn; French: Rivière Assiniboine) is a 1,070-kilometre (660 mi) long river that runs through the prairies of Western Canada in Saskatchewan and Manitoba. It is a tributary of the Red River. The Assiniboine is a typical meandering river with a single main channel embanked within a flat, shallow valley in some places and a steep valley in others. Its main tributaries are the Qu'Appelle, Souris, Shell River and Whitesand Rivers.

The river takes its name from the Assiniboine, a First Nations peoples of the northern Great Plains. Robert Douglas of the Geographical Names Board of Canada (1933) made several comments as to its origin: "The name commemorates the Assiniboine natives called by La Vérendrye in 1730 'Assiniboils' and by Governor Knight in 1715 of the Hudson's Bay Company 'stone Indians.' Assiniboine is the name of an Indian tribe and is derived from 'assine' a stone and 'bwan' native name of the Sioux, hence Stony Sioux name was possibly given because they used heated stones in cooking their food."

== Course ==
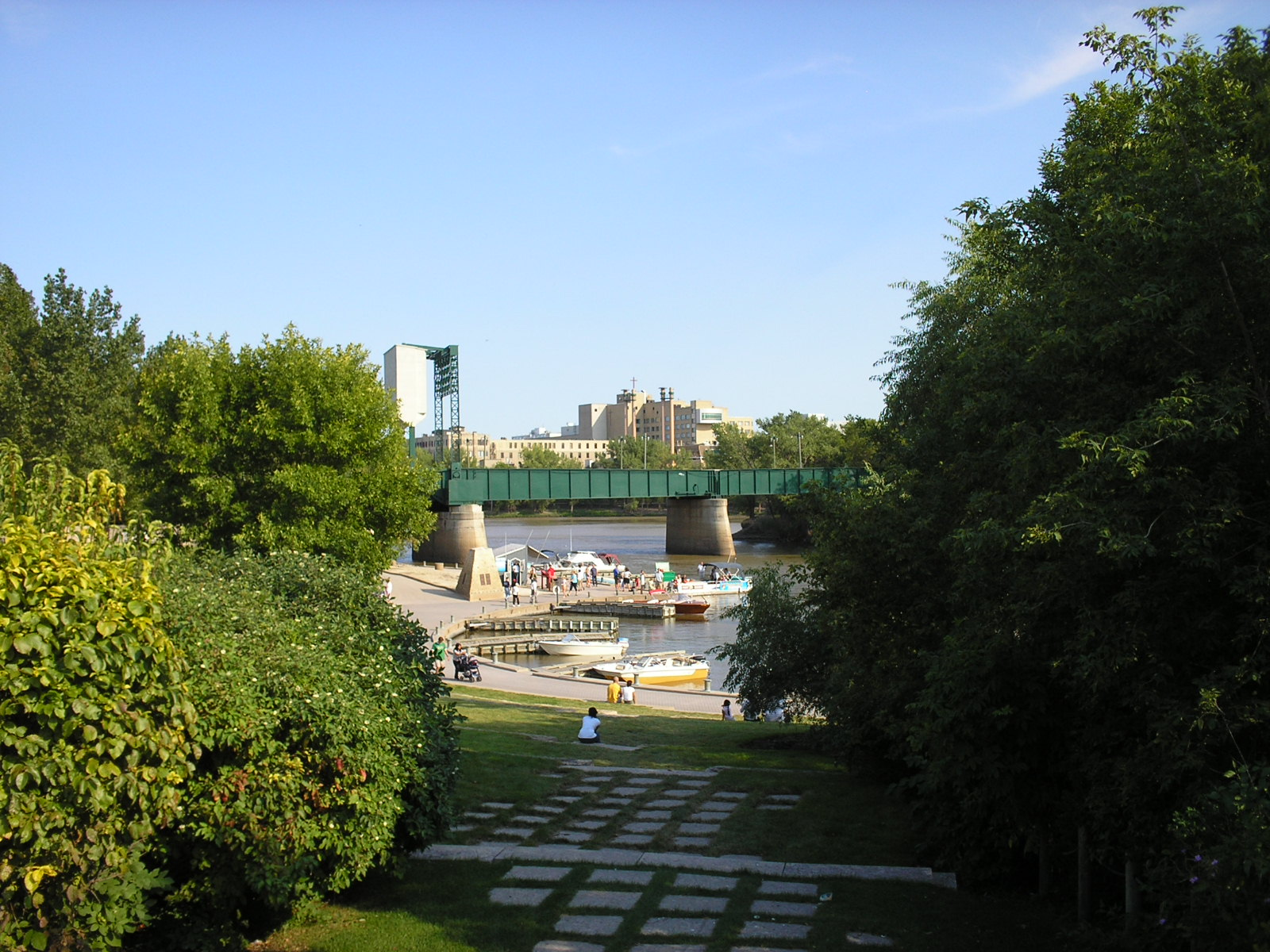
Junction of the Red and Assiniboine rivers in Downtown Winnipeg

The Assiniboine River rises in eastern Saskatchewan east of the community of Kelvington on the upper prairie level above the Manitoba Escarpment. The Assiniboine River flows through three basic zones with different channel characteristics. Upstream of Brandon, the main stem of the river and its most important tributaries flow within a very large valley. The valley was cut by huge glacial melt water flows at the end of the last glaciation. The floor of this spillway valley provides a natural floodplain for the river and the valley provides a significant storage volume making the construction of the Shellmouth Dam north of Russell both technically and economically viable. The major tributaries in this reach are the Qu'Appelle, Shell, and Little Saskatchewan Rivers.

The glacial flows created a large delta east of Brandon extending almost to Portage la Prairie. The river has eroded down through sediments of the delta cutting a narrow valley through these sediments as it drops through a vertical distance of about 150 m (490 ft) to the Lake Agassiz – Red River Plain. In this valley, the river is confined with a narrow valley floor. The Souris River is the primary tributary contributing flow to the Assiniboine in this reach.

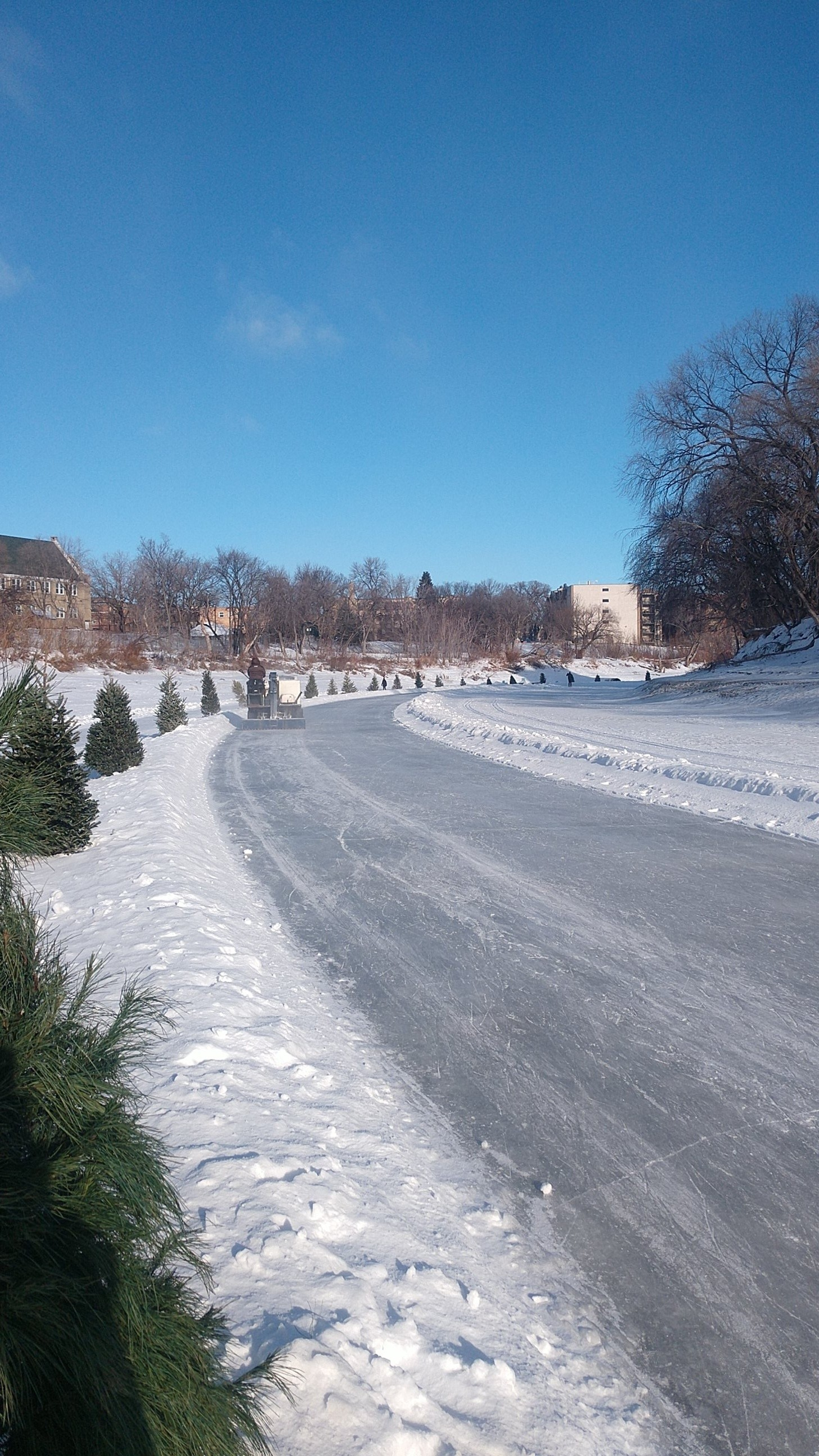
Skating trail section on the Assiniboine River near Osborne Village in Winnipeg

Near Portage la Prairie the river emerges from the delta reach onto the relatively flat Red River plain (the floor of former glacial Lake Agassiz) and at this point it can flow in any direction from roughly northwest to roughly southeast. The gradient of the river channel within the delta reach to the west is relatively high, so the river water velocities are fairly high and the waters of the river carry significant amounts of sediment. The gradient in the flat Red River plain is much less and the velocity of the river water flowing over this plain is much lower. Therefore, the sediments carried by the river waters as they flow through the delta reach are deposited onto the plain. The Assiniboine winds its way east eventually joining the Red River at The Forks in Winnipeg, Manitoba.

The Assiniboine River has changed course numerous times over past centuries. It has followed its modern course for approximately 700 years. The Assiniboine River formerly met the Red River near the present-day mouth of the La Salle River. A Government of Manitoba report following the 2011 Assiniboine River flood found that the flood "could have resulted in the river flowing east by a different route, possibly joining the Red River south of Winnipeg, or potentially even flowing north to Lake Manitoba as it did thousands of years ago," without the flood control infrastructure currently in place.

=== Tributaries ===
Notable tributaries of the Assiniboine River include:

- Whitesand River, which joins it near Kamsack, Saskatchewan
- Lilian River, which joins it at Sturgis, Saskatchewan
- Shell River, which joins at Lake of the Prairies
- Souris River, which joins it near Wawanesa, Manitoba
- Birdtail Creek which joins at the Birdtail Sioux First Nation
- Little Saskatchewan River, which joins west of Brandon
- Qu'Appelle River, which joins near the historic Fort Ellice site of the Hudson's Bay Company

== Flow rates and flood potential ==
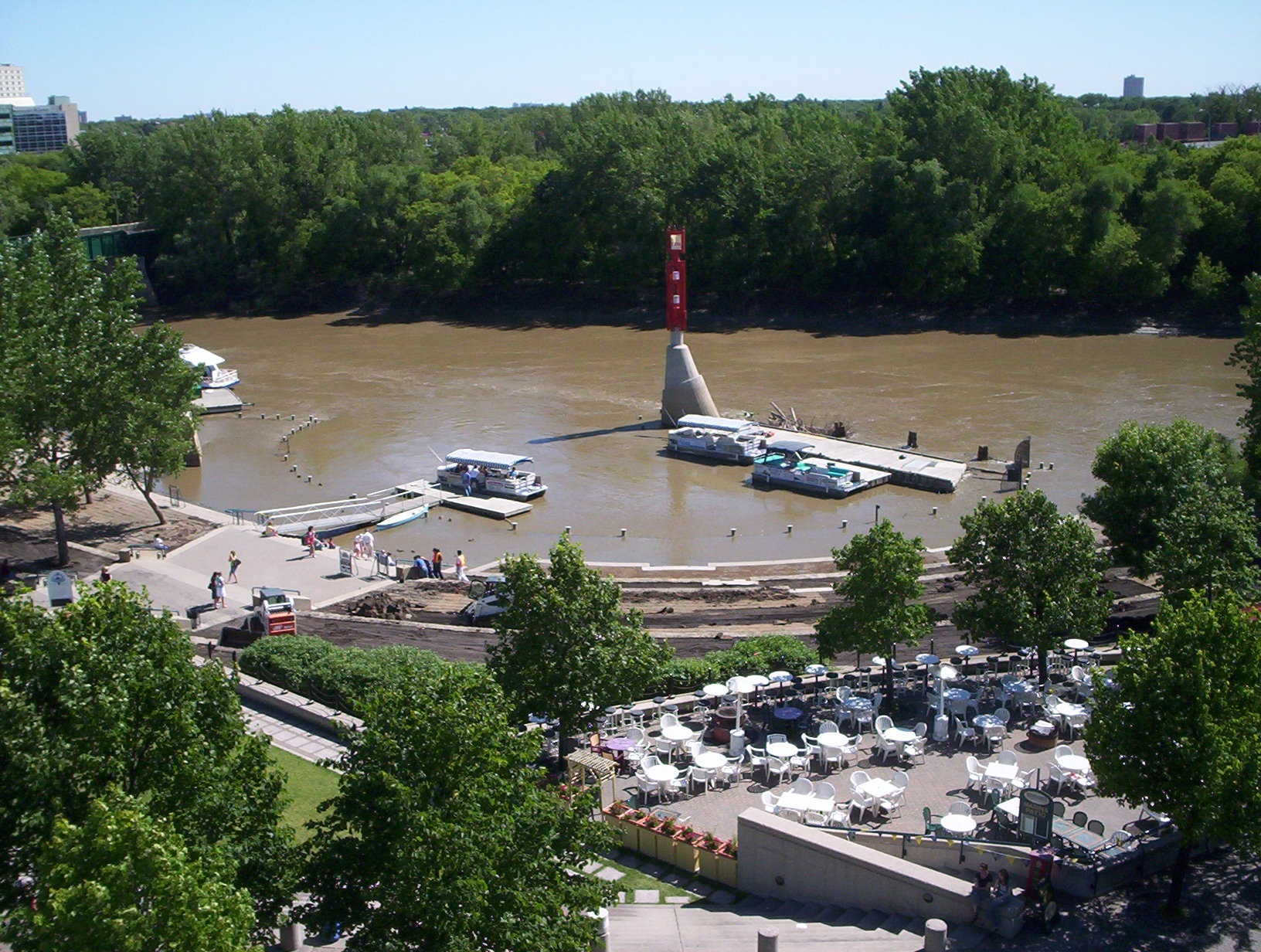
The Assiniboine River flooding the Forks Marina in Winnipeg

There are three hydrometric stations on the river that have been taking measurements since 1913. The Assiniboine River near Headingley has an average discharge of 45 m^{3}/s (1,600 cu ft/s). One millimeter of runoff from half the watershed would take 70 hours to drain at flow rates of 360 m^{3}/s (13,000 cu ft/s). The following discharge rates were recorded during the 1995 flood:

Location	Peak flow, 1995	Mean flow, April 1995	Mean flow, May 1995	Max flow, date
Russell	360 m^{3}/s (13,000 cu ft/s); May 4	34.2 m^{3}/s (1,210 cu ft/s)	46.3 m^{3}/s (1,640 cu ft/s)	504 m^{3}/s (17,800 cu ft/s); April 29, 1922
Brandon	566 m^{3}/s (20,000 cu ft/s); April 26	81.1 m^{3}/s (2,860 cu ft/s)	104.0 m^{3}/s (3,670 cu ft/s)	651 m^{3}/s (23,000 cu ft/s); May 7, 1923
Headingley	300 m^{3}/s (11,000 cu ft/s); April 20	115.0 m^{3}/s (4,060 cu ft/s)	142.0 m^{3}/s (5,010 cu ft/s)	614 m^{3}/s (21,700 cu ft/s); April 27, 1916

It is prone to spring flooding. Some flood flows can be diverted into Lake Manitoba at Portage la Prairie. In 1967, the Shellmouth Dam was built in Shellmouth to help reduce flood peaks and to supplement flows during dry periods. The Portage Diversion was completed in 1970. Despite these efforts, in May 2011 it was necessary to breach one of the dikes beside the river to relieve flood stresses east of Portage la Prairie. A Manitoba-wide state of emergency was declared in the wake of one in three hundred-year floods on the Assiniboine River at Brandon. Below are the actual observed flow rates for major floods at different locations along the river:

Location	1882 peak flow	1976 peak flow	2011 peak flow	2014 peak flow	2017 peak flow
Brandon	1,200 m^{3}/s (43,000 cu ft/s)	610 m^{3}/s (21,700 cu ft/s)	1,040 m^{3}/s (36,700 cu ft/s)	1,101 m^{3}/s (38,870 cu ft/s)	670 m^{3}/s (23,500 cu ft/s)
Portage la Prairie	1,456 m^{3}/s (51,414 cu ft/s)	1,400 m^{3}/s (49,000 cu ft/s)	1,500 m^{3}/s (53,100 cu ft/s)	1,480 m^{3}/s (52,100 cu ft/s)	1,100 m^{3}/s (39,000 cu ft/s)
Headingley	910 m^{3}/s (32,000 cu ft/s)	610 m^{3}/s (21,700 cu ft/s)	540 m^{3}/s (19,200 cu ft/s)	TBD	435 m^{3}/s (15,360 cu ft/s)

- Note: Flows in 1882 occurred before any flood protection measures such as the Shellmouth Reservoir and Portage Diversion were built.

Looking specifically at the Assiniboine River at Portage La Prairie, where maximum river flows occur prior to historical spillovers (prior to construction of the Portage Diversion and the Lower Assiniboine River Dikes) into the watersheds of Lake Manitoba and the La Salle River, the top 10 calculated natural peak flow rates before construction of the current flood infrastructure are:

Year	Calculated peak flow
1882	1,456 m^{3}/s (51,414 cu ft/s)
1902	915 m^{3}/s (32,322 cu ft/s)
1904	1,184 m^{3}/s (41,806 cu ft/s)
1974	853 m^{3}/s (30,121 cu ft/s)
1976	1,420 m^{3}/s (50,137 cu ft/s)
1995	893 m^{3}/s (31,551 cu ft/s)
2009	770 m^{3}/s (27,202 cu ft/s)
2011	1,702 m^{3}/s (60,114 cu ft/s)
2014	1,540 m^{3}/s (54,369 cu ft/s)
2017	1,143 m^{3}/s (40,350 cu ft/s)

== Fish species ==
Fish species commonly found in the river include walleye, yellow perch, northern pike, mooneye, burbot, channel catfish, brown bullhead, rock bass, white sucker, shorthead redhorse, and common carp.

== See also ==
- List of longest rivers of Canada
- List of rivers of Manitoba
- List of rivers of Saskatchewan
- Assiniboine River fur trade
