= Woody River =

River in Western Canada

- Location of the mouth in Manitoba Woody River (Canada)

Location
- Country: Canada
- Provinces: Manitoba; Saskatchewan

Physical characteristics
- Source: Woody Lake
  - location: Porcupine Hills
  - coordinates: 52.4657°N 101.6911°W
  - elevation: 691 m (2,267 ft)
- Mouth: Swan Lake
  - location: Division No. 17, Manitoba
  - coordinates: 52.5103°N 100.8463°W
  - elevation: 259 m (850 ft)

Basin features
- River system: Nelson River
- Tributaries
  - left: Whitefish Creek; Hubbell Creek; Bowsman River
  - right: Hart Creek

Woody River is a river in the Canadian provinces of Manitoba and Saskatchewan. The river's source is in the Porcupine Hills and Porcupine Provincial Forest of eastern Saskatchewan. From there it flows south through boreal forest and then east through Boreal Plains in the Parkland Region of Manitoba en route to Swan Lake. The river parallels the Swan River for much of its route as it travels through Swan River Valley between Duck Mountain and Porcupine Hills of the Manitoba Escarpment. Bowsman is the only notable community along the course of Woody River. Several highways cross it, including Saskatchewan's Highway 980, Manitoba's Roads 588, 366, 268, and Manitoba's Highway 10.

== Course ==
Woody River begins from the southern shore of Woody Lake at Woody Lake Weir in Porcupine Hills Provincial Park. The main tributary for Woody Lake is Midnight Creek which has its source deep in the Porcupine Hills and is connected to several lakes in the provincial park, including Isbister, Townsend, Elbow, Spirit, and Island Lakes.

From Woody Lake and Porcupine Provincial Park, Woody River travels south through the RM of Hudson Bay No. 394 and out of Porcupine Hills. It enters the RM of Livingston No. 331 and the Swan River Valley before heading east. The river parallels Swan River, which also has its source in the Porcupine Hills, and it is joined by multiple tributaries, crossed by several highways, and passes through Bowsman, which is at confluence of Woody River and Smith Creek. It empties into the western shore of Swan Lake at Swan Lake First Nation.

=== Tributaries ===
Tributaries of Woody River, from upstream to downstream, include:

- Midnight Creek (flows into Woody Lake)
  - Island Creek
- Whitefish Creek (from Whitefish Lake)
  - Little Fish Creek (into Whitefish Lake)
    - Smallfish Creek
  - Rock Creek (into Whitefish Lake)
    - Mud Creek
- McVey Creek
- Mink Creek
- Hart Creek
- Hubbell Creek
  - Trout Creek
- Whitebeech Creek
- Smith Creek
- Bowsman River
- Camp Nine Creek
  - Mullin Creek
- Kemulch Creek
- Birch River
- Caldon River

== Parks and recreation ==
At the headwaters of Woody River in Saskatchewan is a portion Porcupine Hills Provincial Park called the Woody River Block. The park is centred around the lakes that make up the source of the river, including Isbister Lake, Townsend Lake, Elbow Lake, Woody Lake, Spirit Lake, Island Lake, and Smallfish Lake. Amenities and activities include camping, fishing, snowmobiling, swimming, and hiking.

Whitefish Lake Provincial Park is a provincial park in Manitoba on Whitefish Lake, which is upstream along Whitefish Creek, a tributary of Woody River. The park has 40-unserviced campsites and lake access for fishing and other watersports.

== Fish species ==
Fish commonly found in the river include walleye and northern pike.

== See also ==
- List of rivers of Saskatchewan
- List of rivers of Manitoba
- Tourism in Saskatchewan
- Hudson Bay drainage basin
- Wood River, a river of a similar name in south-western Saskatchewan
