= Parr Hill Lake =

Lake in Saskatchewan, Canada

- Location in Saskatchewan Parr Hill Lake (Canada)
- Location: RM of Hudson Bay No. 394, Saskatchewan
- Coordinates: 52.3706°N 102.1939°W
- Part of: Nelson River drainage basin
- River sources: Porcupine Hills
- Primary outflows: Swan River
- Basin countries: Canada
- Surface area: 143.7 ha (355 acres)
- Max. depth: 12.01 m (39.4 ft)
- Shore length^{1}: 6.58 km (4.09 mi)
- Surface elevation: 484 m (1,588 ft)
- ^{1} Shore length is not a well-defined measure.

Parr Hill Lake is a lake in the east-central part of the Canadian province of Saskatchewan in the boreal forest ecozone of Canada. It is part of the Swan River drainage basin and is situated in the Porcupine Hills and Saskatchewan's Porcupine Provincial Forest. A block of Porcupine Hills Provincial Park is on the north-eastern shore of the lake. The lake and park are accessed from Highway 982, which is also known as Little Swan Road.

Parr Hill Lake sits in a glacier-formed valley in the Porcupine Hills and is fed by several small rivers and the surrounding muskeg. It is connected to Swan River via a short channel that flows out of the south end of the lake. To the north of the lake, and in the same valley, is Pepaw Lake. While the lakes are in different river systems–Pepaw Lake flows north into Pepaw River and Parr Hill Lake flows south into Swan River–only a marshy portage separates the lakes.

== Parks and recreation ==
Along the north-eastern shore of the lake is Parr Hill Lake Recreation Site, which is part of Porcupine Hills Provincial Park. It was a stand-alone park until 2018 when it and four other nearby recreation sites were amalgamated in the creation of Saskatchewan's newest provincial park, Porcupine Hills. The site features a campground with 12 campsites, a picnic area, dock, fish cleaning station, and lake access.

== Fish species ==
Fish commonly found in the lake include northern pike and yellow perch.

== See also ==
- List of lakes of Saskatchewan
- List of protected areas of Saskatchewan
- Tourism in Saskatchewan
- Hudson Bay drainage basin
