= Pepaw Lake =

Lake in Saskatchewan, Canada

- Location in Saskatchewan Pepaw Lake (Canada)
- Location: RM of Hudson Bay No. 394, Saskatchewan
- Coordinates: 52.4243°N 102.2246°W
- Part of: Nelson River drainage basin
- River sources: Porcupine Hills
- Primary outflows: Pepaw River
- Basin countries: Canada
- Surface area: 85.9 ha (212 acres)
- Max. depth: 7.93 m (26.0 ft)
- Shore length^{1}: 4.55 km (2.83 mi)
- Surface elevation: 486 m (1,594 ft)
- ^{1} Shore length is not a well-defined measure.

Pepaw Lake, also spelt Peepaw and Pee Paw, is a lake in the east-central part of the Canadian province of Saskatchewan in the boreal forest ecozone of Canada. There is a provincial park on the eastern shore of the lake, and it is located at the junction of Highway 983 and Highway 982, which is also known as Little Swan Road. Access to the lake and the park is from Little Swan Road.

Pepaw Lake is situated in a glacier-formed valley in the Porcupine Hills and within Saskatchewan's Porcupine Provincial Forest. While it is not along the course of the Pepaw River, it is connected to the river via a short stream through a marshy area. Upstream along the Pepaw River is McBride Lake and downstream is Saginas Lake; both lakes have recreation sites that are part of Porcupine Hills Provincial Park. To the south of the lake, and in the same valley, is Parr Hill Lake, which also has a recreation site belonging to the same provincial park. While the lakes are in different river systems–Pepaw Lake flows north into Pepaw River and Parr Hill Lake flows south into Swan River–only a marshy portage separates them.

== Parks and recreation ==
Along the eastern shore of the lake is Pepaw Lake Recreation Site, which is one of five blocks that make up Porcupine Hills Provincial Park. Until 2018, the recreation site was a stand-alone park. At that time Pepaw Lake and four other recreation sites were merged into one to create Porcupine Hills Provincial Park.

The recreation site has access to the lake, which includes a beach and a dock. There is also a small picnic area and a 7.4 kilometre trail that encircles the lake.

== Fish species ==
Fish commonly found in the lake include northern pike and walleye.

== See also ==
- List of lakes of Saskatchewan
- List of protected areas of Saskatchewan
- Tourism in Saskatchewan
- Hudson Bay drainage basin
