= Smallfish Lake =

Lake in Saskatchewan, Canada

- Location in Saskatchewan Smallfish Lake (Canada)
- Location: Porcupine Hills Provincial Park, Saskatchewan
- Coordinates: 52.4001°N 101.6505°W
- Part of: Nelson River drainage basin
- Primary outflows: Smallfish Creek
- Catchment area: Woody River
- Basin countries: Canada
- Surface area: 240.8 ha (595 acres)
- Max. depth: 3.7 m (12 ft)
- Shore length^{1}: 10.1 km (6.3 mi)
- Surface elevation: 656 m (2,152 ft)
- ^{1} Shore length is not a well-defined measure.

Smallfish Lake is a lake in the Canadian province of Saskatchewan. It is located in the east-central part of the province right alongside the border with Manitoba in the Porcupine Hills and Porcupine Provincial Forest. The lake is part of the Woody River Block of Porcupine Hills Provincial Park and is situated in boreal forest surrounded by hills, other small lakes, and muskeg. Access to the lake is on the western side from Highway 980.

== Description ==
Smallfish Lake is in the Woody River drainage basin which flows into Manitoba's Swan Lake. Several streams and rivers flow into Smallfish Lake from the surrounding hills and other lakes, including Spring Lake, Pickerel Lake, and Grassy Lake. The lake's outlet, Smallfish Creek, is located at the north-east corner of the lake and it flows east into Manitoba where it meets up with Little Fish Creek. Little Fish Creek is a tributary of Whitefish Lake. Whitefish Creek flows out of Whitefish Lake back into Saskatchewan where it meets up with Woody River.

On the western shore of the lake, there is a small campground that is part of Porcupine Hills Provincial Park. There are no communities nor other amenities on the lake.

== Parks and recreation ==
Prior to the formation of Porcupine Hills Provincial Park in 2018, the park on Smallfish Lake was part of a provincial recreation site called Woody River Recreation Site. On the lake's western shore there's a small campground with six campsites, a boat launch, fish cleaning station, and a picnic area.

== Fish species ==
Fish commonly found in the lake include walleye, perch, and northern pike. Smallfish Lake is a shallow lake at about 12 feet deep and is prone to freeze nearly to the bottom on occasions. In 2004, winter kill killed the perch population and the lake had to be restocked.

== See also ==
- List of lakes of Saskatchewan
- Tourism in Saskatchewan
