= Saginas Lake =

Lake in Saskatchewan, Canada

- Location in Saskatchewan Saginas Lake (Canada)
- Location: RM of Hudson Bay No. 394, Saskatchewan
- Coordinates: 52.5001°N 102.2338°W
- Part of: Nelson River drainage basin
- Primary inflows: Pepaw River
- Primary outflows: Pepaw River
- Basin countries: Canada
- Surface area: 114.63 ha (283.3 acres)
- Max. depth: 4.6 m (15 ft)
- Shore length^{1}: 7.62 km (4.73 mi)
- Surface elevation: 466 m (1,529 ft)
- ^{1} Shore length is not a well-defined measure.

Saginas Lake, is a lake in the east-central part of the Canadian province of Saskatchewan in the boreal forest ecozone of Canada. It is located along the course of the Pepaw River and is situated in the Porcupine Hills. It is within Saskatchewan's Porcupine Provincial Forest and a portion of Porcupine Hills Provincial Park is on the eastern shore of the lake. Upstream along the Pepaw River is Pepaw and McBride Lakes—both of which lakes also have recreation sites that are part of Porcupine Hills Provincial Park. The lake and park are accessed from Highway 982, also known as Little Swan Road.

== Parks and recreation ==
Along the eastern shore of the lake is Saginas Lake Recreation Site (52.5101°N 102.2288°W) which is part of Porcupine Hills Provincial Park. It was part of Hudson Bay Regional Park until 2018 when it and four other nearby recreation sites were amalgamated in the creation of Saskatchewan's newest provincial park, Porcupine Hills.

The park has a beach, small campground, dock, fish cleaning station, and bathrooms. The campground is not suited for RVing. The park was slated to be decommissioned but through the efforts of the Hudson Bay Wildlife Federation, the park was saved and is now part of the Porcupine Hills Provincial Park. Prior to becoming part of the provincial park, it was part of Hudson Bay Regional Park.

== Fish species ==
To increase the lake's depth and improve fish habitat, a small earthen dam was built downstream (52.5324°N 102.2547°W) of the lake along the Pepaw River. Fish commonly found in the lake include northern pike, walleye, yellow perch, and white sucker. It was last stocked with 200,000 walleye fry in 2019.

== See also ==
- List of lakes of Saskatchewan
- List of protected areas of Saskatchewan
- Tourism in Saskatchewan
- Hudson Bay drainage basin
