= Piwei River =

River in Saskatchewan, Canada

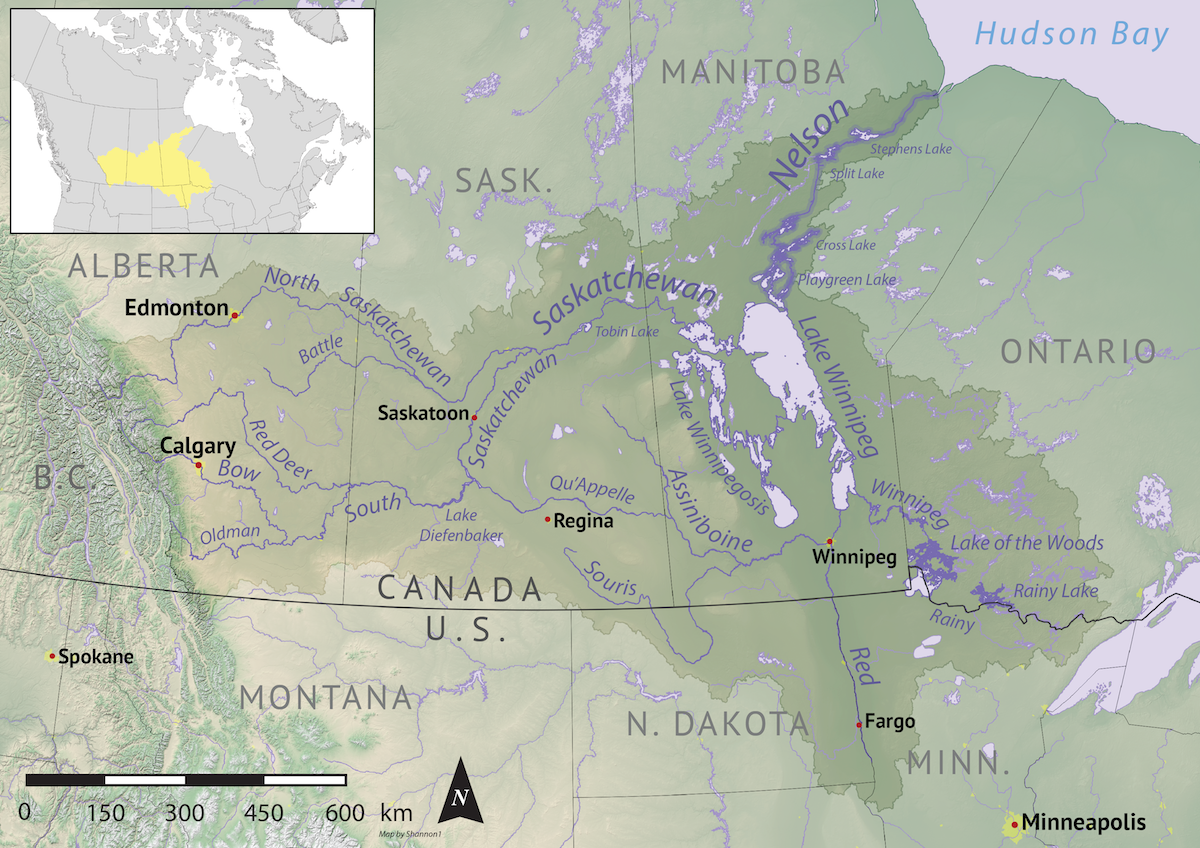
- Nelson River drainage basin

- Location of the mouth in Saskatchewan Piwei River (Canada)

Location
- Country: Canada
- Provinces: Saskatchewan
- Rural municipality: RM of Hudson Bay No. 394

Physical characteristics
- Source: Porcupine Hills
  - location: Piwei Lakes
  - coordinates: 52.5365°N 103.1580°W
  - elevation: 511 m (1,677 ft)
- Mouth: Etomami River
  - coordinates: 52.4336°N 102.6802°W
  - elevation: 477 m (1,565 ft)

Basin features
- River system: Red Deer River
- Tributaries
  - right: Big Valley Creek, Ravina Creek, Cameron Creek, Gara Creek

Piwei River is a river in the east-central part of the Canadian province of Saskatchewan in the boreal forest ecozone of Canada. It begins at the western end of the Porcupine Hills at Piwei Lakes and heads in an easterly direction through a glacier-formed valley and into the Etomami River, which is a tributary of the Red Deer River.

The river is accessed from Highways 984 and 983. Save for a small recreation park on the river's north bank, there are no communities nor settlements along its course. Big Valley Lake Ecological Reserve, one of Saskatchewan's Representative Area Ecological Reserves, is in Piwei River's watershed upstream along Big Valley Creek's course on the shore of Big Valley Lake.

== Course ==
Piwei River begins south of the town of Porcupine Plain at an elevation of 511 m (1,677 ft) in a chain of several lakes called the Piwei Lakes at the western end of the Porcupine Hills. From the lakes, it heads east through the Porcupine Provincial Forest and glacier-formed valleys en route to its terminus at the Etomami River. The valley that the river follows continues east past Etomami River and is a natural portage to the Pepaw River, which follows that same valley farther east.

Tributaries

- Mud Creek (into Piwei Lakes)
- Big Valley Creek
  - Wells Creek
    - Lawson Creek
- Ravina Creek
- Cameron Creek
- Gara Creek

== Piwei River Recreation Site ==
Piwei River Recreation Site (52.4843°N 102.9883°W) is a recreation site located on the north bank of Piwei River, just downstream from the Piwei Lakes. It is about 8 ha (20 acres) in size and 509 metres (1,670 ft) above sea level. The park facilities include an access to snowmobile trails, a warm up shelter, and access to the river. Accessed to the park is from Highway 984.

== See also ==
- List of rivers of Saskatchewan
- Tourism in Saskatchewan
- Hudson Bay drainage basin
