= Armit River =

River in Western Canada

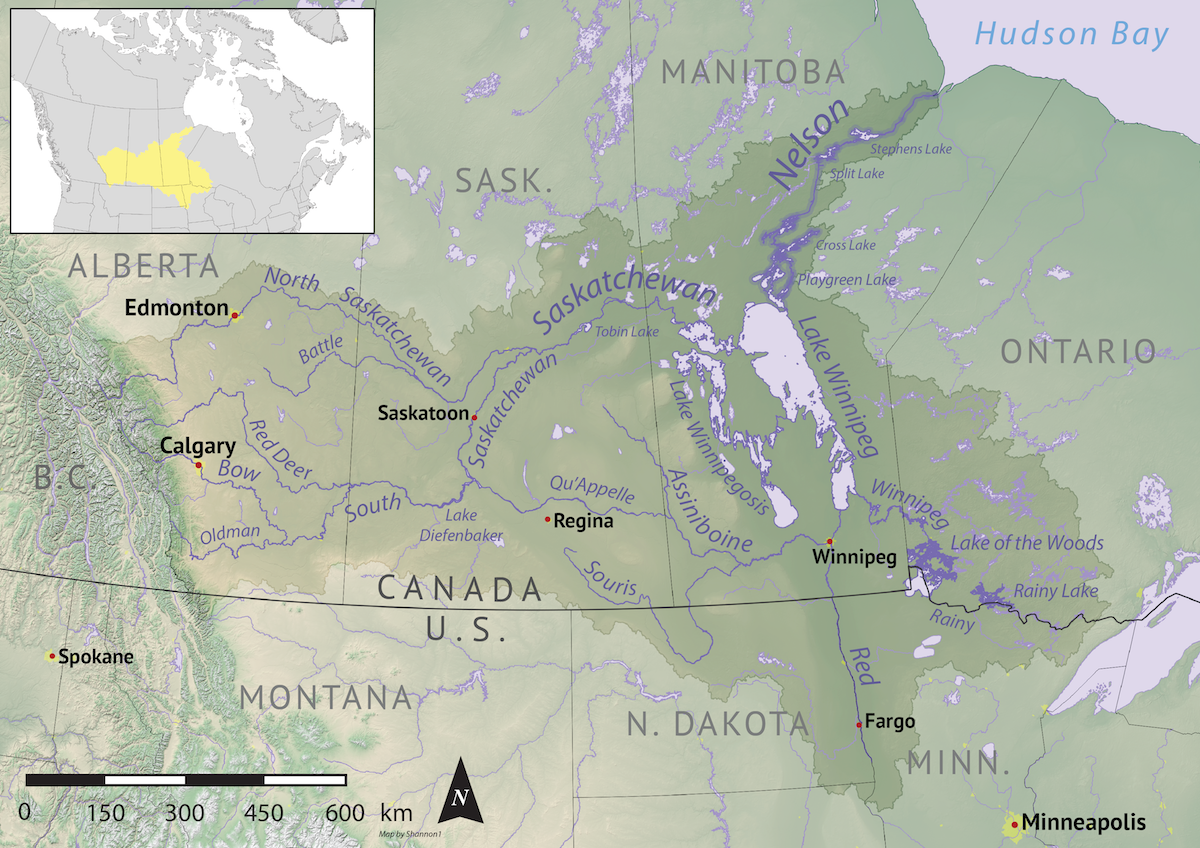
- Nelson River drainage basin

- Location of the mouth in Manitoba Armit River (Canada)

Location
- Country: Canada
- Provinces: Saskatchewan; Manitoba

Physical characteristics
- Source: Armit Lake
  - location: Porcupine Hills
  - coordinates: 52.5593°N 101.6201°W
  - elevation: 725 m (2,379 ft)
- Mouth: Red Deer Lake
  - coordinates: 52.9359°N 101.5131°W
  - elevation: 259 m (850 ft)

Basin features
- River system: Red Deer River
- Tributaries
  - left: Duncan Creek, Little Armit River
  - right: Johnson Creek

Armit River is a river in the Canadian provinces of Manitoba and Saskatchewan in the Nelson River drainage basin. The river begins in the Porcupine Hills of the Manitoba Escarpment at Armit Lake and flows in a northerly direction closely following the Manitoba / Saskatchewan border and into Red Deer Lake along the course of the Red Deer River.

== Course ==
Armit River begins from the north-western shore of Armit Lake, which is the largest lake in the Porcupine Hills, and flows northward through boreal forest, canyons, muskeg, and rolling hills en route to Red Deer Lake. Once the river leaves Armit Lake, it flows into the smaller Little Armit Lake and from there, it crosses into Saskatchewan following a valley. Shortly after, the river re-enters Manitoba and flows through muskeg and into Muskeg Lake. North from Muskeg Lake, the river flows through the 264-hectare (650-acre) Armit Meadows Ecological Reserve and then into Armit River Canyon, which takes it out of the Porcupine Hills and back into Saskatchewan. The river then parallels the border past Highway 3 before returning to Manitoba where it is met by Little Armit River. Armit River carries on to the north-east and into a large marshy estuary at Red Deer Lake. Several other rivers flow into this same estuary, such as Red Deer River, Little Woody River, and Lost River. Most of the river's course is in the Porcupine Provincial Forest.

=== Tributaries ===
Several rivers flow into Armit River, including the following:

- Johnson Creek
- Little Armit River
  - North Armit River
  - Kinakin Creek
    - Geize Creek
- Duncan Creek

== Armit River Recreation Site ==
Armit River Recreation Site (52.8302°N 101.6777°W) is a Saskatchewan provincial recreation site on the banks of the Armit River in the RM of Hudson Bay No. 394. It is right on the border with Manitoba and accessed from Saskatchewan's Highway 3. It has a small campground, hiking trails, and access to the river for fishing. Brook trout are a commonly found fish in the river.

== Fish species ==
Armit River (and its tributaries) have a naturalised population of brook trout. In addition, the Saskatchewan Ministry of Natural Resources stocks the river with brown trout and more brook trout.

== See also ==
- List of rivers of Manitoba
- List of rivers of Saskatchewan
- List of protected areas of Manitoba
- List of protected areas of Saskatchewan
- List of ecological reserves in Manitoba
