= Geography of Manitoba =

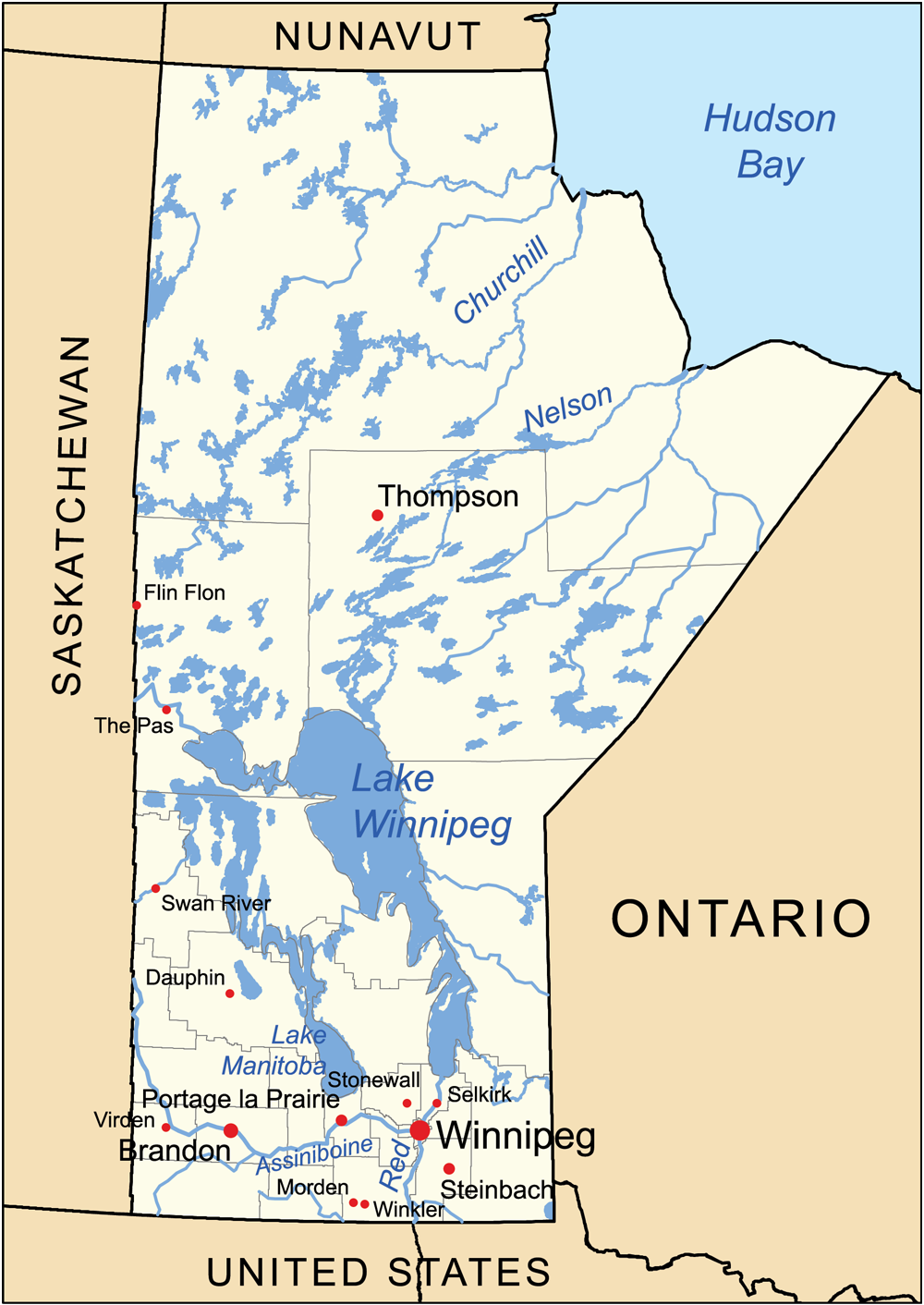
Map of Manitoba

The geography of Manitoba addresses the easternmost of the three prairie Canadian provinces, located in the longitudinal centre of Canada. Manitoba borders on Saskatchewan to the west, Ontario to the east, Nunavut to the north, and the American states of North Dakota and Minnesota to the south. Although the border with Saskatchewan appears straight on large-scale maps, it actually has many right-angle corners that give the appearance of a slanted line. In elevation, Manitoba ranges from sea level on Hudson Bay to 2727 ft (831 m) on top of Baldy Mountain. The northern sixty percent of the province is on the Canadian Shield. The northernmost regions of Manitoba lie permafrost (permanently frozen subsoil), and a section of tundra bordering Hudson Bay.

All waters in the province flow into Hudson Bay, due to its coastal area. Lake Winnipegosis and Lake Winnipeg are two of its largest lakes. Important rivers are the Red River, Assiniboine River, Nelson River, and Churchill River. Manitoba is the sixth largest Canadian province, and the eighth largest Canadian province by percentage of fresh water. The capital and largest city of the province is Winnipeg; the province lies in the time zone UTC −6.

== Environmental geography ==
Manitoba has an extreme climate, but southern latitudes allow agriculture. The northern area of the region ranges from coniferous forests to muskeg to tundra in the far north. Before settlement had occurred, a vast portion of southern Manitoba was either flood plain or swamp. An extensive system for drainage ditches was required throughout south-central Manitoba to make the region suitable for cultivation.

Boreal forests of the southern part of the province have extensive black spruce and white spruce forests. The tundra region of northern Manitoba exhibits more sparse black spruce forests whose tree heights are limited by the thin soils, permafrost underlayer and generally cold climate. In this region polar bears are found, denning in the Wapusk National Park and migrating to hunt for seals when pack ice forms on Hudson Bay.

=== Ecozones and ecoregions ===
The following ecozones and ecoregions are found in Manitoba.

- Southern Arctic Ecozone
  - Maguse River Upland Ecoregion (Hubbart Point Ecodistrict)
- Taiga Shield Ecozone
  - Kazan River Upland Ecoregion (Pakulak Lake Ecodistrict, Blevens Lake Ecodistrict, Nejanilini Lake Ecodistrict)
  - Selwyn Lake Upland Ecoregion (Nueltin Lake Ecodistrict, Seal River Ecodistrict, Sprott Lake Ecodistrict, Embleton Lake Ecodistrict, Big Sand Lake Ecodistrict, Northern Indian Lake Ecodistrict)
- Boreal Shield Ecozone
  - Churchill River Upland Ecoregion (Reindeer Lake Ecodistrict, Wells Lake Ecodistrict, Southern Indian Lake Ecodistrict, Waskaiowaka Lake Ecodistrict, Granville Lake Ecodistrict, Orr Lake Ecodistrict, Three Point Lake Ecodistrict, Wekusko Ecodistrict, Flin Flon Ecodistrict, Reed Lake Ecodistrict)
  - Hayes River Upland Ecoregion (Knee Lake Ecodistrict, Pikwitonei Lake Ecodistrict, Silsby Lake Ecodistrict, Sipiwesk Lake Ecodistrict, Island Lake Ecodistrict, Gods Lake Ecodistrict, Norway House Ecodistrict, Gunisao Lake Ecodistrict, Cantin Lake Ecodistrict)
  - Lac Seul Upland Ecoregion (Berens River Ecodistrict, Wrong Lake Ecodistrict, Nopiming Ecodistrict)
  - Lake of the Woods Ecoregion (Stead Ecodistrict, Pinawa Ecodistrict, Kenora Ecodistrict, Whitemouth Ecodistrict, Piney Ecodistrict
- Boreal Plains Ecozone
  - Mid-Boreal Lowland Ecoregion (Playgreen Lake Ecodistrict, Namew Lake Ecodistrict, Cormorant Lake Ecodistrict, Cedar Lake Ecodistrict, Summerberry Ecodistrict, The Pas Moraine Ecodistrict, Saskatchewan Delta Ecodistrict, Grand Rapids Ecodistrict, Narrows Islands Ecodistrict, Overflowing River Ecodistrict, Pelican Lake Ecodistrict, Chitek Lake Ecodistrict, Sturgeon Bay Ecodistrict, Grindstone Ecodistrict)
  - Boreal Transition Ecoregion (Swan River Ecodistrict)
  - Mid-Boreal Uplands Ecoregion (Porcupine Hills Ecodistrict, Duck Mountain Ecodistrict, Riding Mountain Ecodistrict)
  - Interlake Plain Ecoregion (Swan Lake Ecodistrict, Waterhen Ecodistrict, Gypsumville Ecodistrict, Ashern Ecodistrict, Gimli Ecodistrict, Steinbach Ecodistrict)
- Prairies Ecozone
  - Aspen Parkland Ecoregion (St. Lazare Ecodistrict, Melville Ecodistrict, Hamiota Ecodistrict, Shilo Ecodistrict, Stockton Ecodistrict, Carberry Ecodistrict, Gainsborough Creek Ecodistrict, Oak Lake Ecodistrict, Hilton Ecodistrict, Killarney Ecodistrict, Manitou Ecodistrict, Grandview Ecodistrict)
  - Lake Manitoba Plain Ecoregion (Dauphin Ecodistrict, Alonsa Ecodistrict, Ste. Rose Ecodistrict, McCreary Ecodistrict, Lundar Ecodistrict, Gladstone Ecodistrict, Langruth Ecodistrict, Winnipeg Ecodistrict, MacGregor Ecodistrict, Portage Ecodistrict, Winkler Ecodistrict, Emerson Ecodistrict)
  - Southwest Manitoba Uplands Ecoregion (Pembina Hills Ecodistrict, Turtle Mountain Ecodistrict)
- Hudson Plains Ecozone
  - Coastal Hudson Bay Lowland Ecoregion (Churchill Ecodistrict, York Factory Ecodistrict, Fort Severn Ecodistrict)
  - Hudson Bay Lowland Ecoregion (Winisk River Lowland Ecodistrict, French Creek Ecodistrict, Sombert Lake Ecodistrict)

== Historical geography ==
Manitoba is bordered on the east by Ontario, on the south by North Dakota and Minnesota, on the west by Saskatchewan, and on the north by Nunavut. Northeast Manitoba follows the Hudson Bay shoreline. Churchill, on the Hudson Bay is the only port for the prairie provinces. The harbour serves as an open market for grain.

There are only three ice-free months a year that allow for the shipments to be sent when shipping through the home port of Churchill.

The Canadian Shield limits the amount of farming in the north, but there are some forestry and mining operations. The majority of the grain production is found in farms in the south.

Central and southern Manitoba is covered by lakes and rivers. Most of the population is centred in the southern third of the province.

Manitoba played a significant role in the European settlement of the Canadian west. Explorers arrived in Manitoba by the Hudson Bay, in search of a passage to China. As the fur trade boomed, settlements rose up in the province to trading posts for the Natives and the voyageurs. The settlement was not easy, and colonization slowed down for several years around 1816. In 1870, the Hudson's Bay Company sold its huge domain to the confederation of Canada.

Settlement inflated in Manitoba when the railway was built in the province and again in late 19th, early 20th century when government promoted settlement by European immigrants.

== Mountain ranges of Manitoba ==
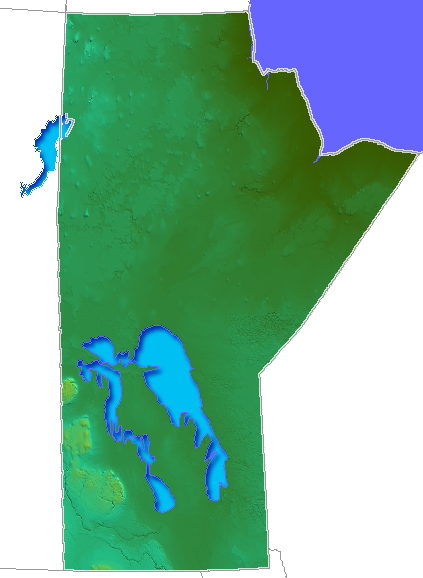
Relief of Manitoba

Manitoba has two mountain/hill ranges, which are both escarpments formed by prehistoric Lake Agassiz: the Pembina Escarpment and the Manitoba Escarpment.

- The Pembina Mountains are located in southern Manitoba and extend to the Assiniboine River and over North Dakota border. The highest point is 2,000 feet.
- The Manitoba Escarpment has four different sets of mountains/hills, and three are in Manitoba: the Riding Mountains, the Duck Mountains, and the Porcupine Mountains.

The highest point in Manitoba is Baldy Mountain, which reaches 2,727 feet (832 m) and is located in the Duck Mountains. Hart Mountain, which is located in the Porcupine Mountains, rises to 2,700 feet and is not far behind.

== Climate ==
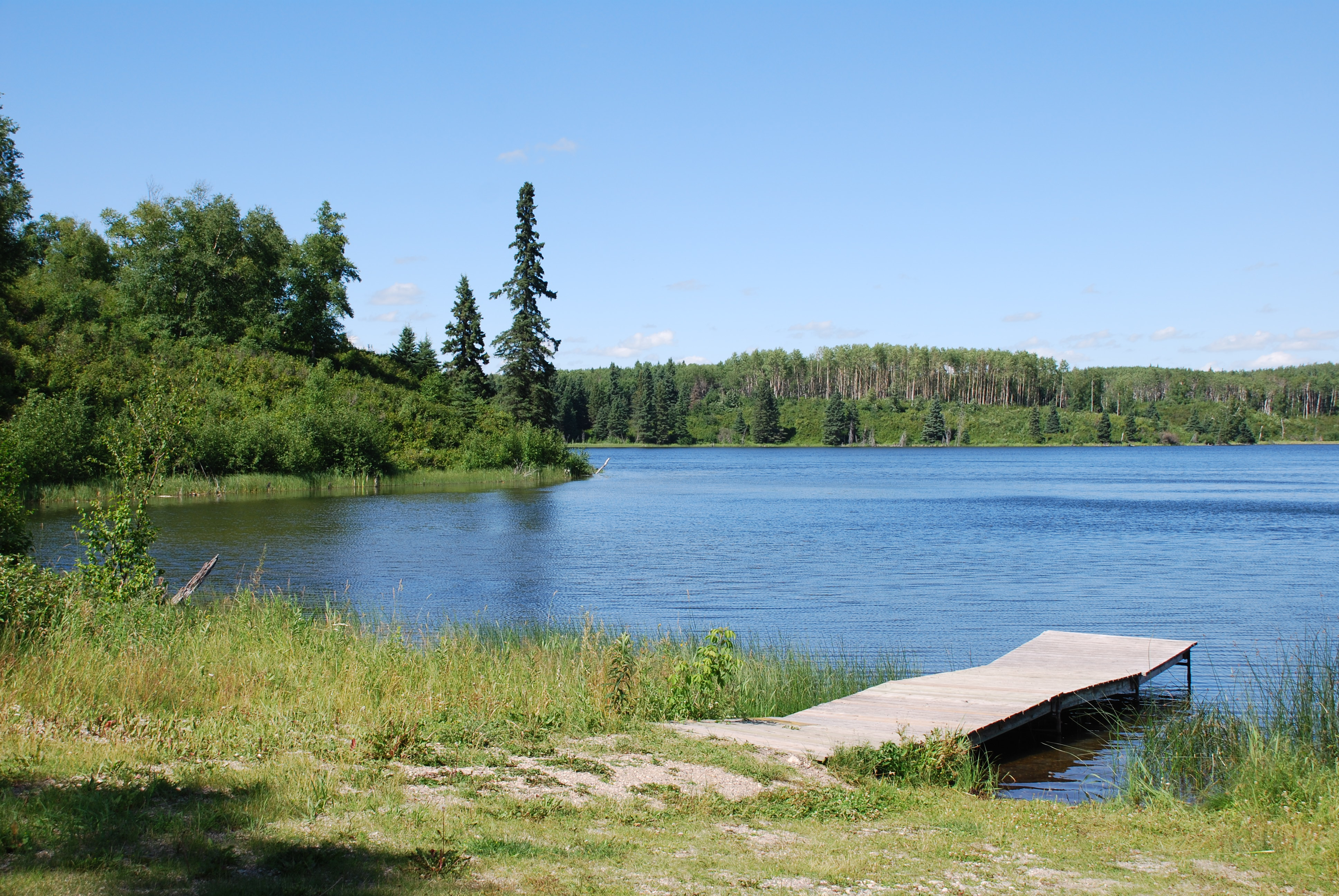
Deep Lake at Riding Mountain National Park

Manitoba has an extreme continental climate. Temperatures and precipitation generally decrease from south to north and increase from east to west. Manitoba is far from the moderating influences of mountain ranges or large bodies of water. Because of the generally flat landscape, it is exposed to cold Arctic high-pressure air masses from the northwest during January and February. In the summer, air masses sometimes come out of the Southern United States, as warm humid air is drawn northward from the Gulf of Mexico. Temperatures exceed 30 °C (86 °F) numerous times each summer, and the combination of heat and humidity can bring the humidex value to the mid-40s. Carman, Manitoba, recorded the second-highest humidex ever in Canada in 2007, with 53.0. According to Environment Canada, Manitoba ranked first for clearest skies year round and ranked second for clearest skies in the summer and for the sunniest province in the winter and spring.

Southern Manitoba (including the city of Winnipeg), falls into the humid continental climate zone (Köppen Dfb). This area is cold and windy in the winter and often has blizzards because of the open landscape. Summers are warm with a moderate length. This region is the most humid area in the prairie provinces, with moderate precipitation. Southwestern Manitoba, though under the same climate classification as the rest of Southern Manitoba, is closer to the semi-arid interior of Palliser's Triangle. The area is drier and more prone to droughts than other parts of southern Manitoba. This area is cold and windy in the winter and has frequent blizzards due to the openness of the Canadian Prairie landscape. Summers are generally warm to hot, with low to moderate humidity.

Southern parts of the province, just north of Tornado Alley, experience tornadoes, with 16 confirmed touchdowns in 2016. In 2007, on 22 and 23 June, numerous tornadoes touched down, the largest an F5 tornado that devastated parts of Elie (the strongest recorded tornado in Canada).

Köppen climate types of Manitoba

The province's northern sections (including the city of Thompson) fall in the subarctic climate zone (Köppen climate classification Dfc). This region features long and extremely cold winters and brief, warm summers with little precipitation. Overnight temperatures as low as −40 °C (−40 °F) occur on several days each winter.

=== Climate data ===
Community	Region	July daily maximum	January daily maximum	Annual precipitation
Morden	Pembina Valley	26 °C (79 °F)	−10 °C (14 °F)	541 mm (21 in)
Winnipeg	Winnipeg	26 °C (79 °F)	−11 °C (12 °F)	521 mm (21 in)
Pierson	Westman Region	27 °C (81 °F)	−9 °C (16 °F)	457 mm (18 in)
Dauphin	Parkland	25 °C (77 °F)	−10 °C (14 °F)	482 mm (19 in)
Steinbach	Eastman	25 °C (77 °F)	−11 °C (12 °F)	581 mm (23 in)
Portage la Prairie	Central Plains	26 °C (79 °F)	−9 °C (16 °F)	532 mm (21 in)
Brandon	Westman	25 °C (77 °F)	−11 °C (12 °F)	474 mm (19 in)
The Pas	Northern	24 °C (75 °F)	−14 °C (7 °F)	450 mm (18 in)
Thompson	Northern	23 °C (73 °F)	−18 °C (0 °F)	474 mm (19 in)
Churchill	Northern	18 °C (64 °F)	−22 °C (−8 °F)	453 mm (18 in)

== Statistics ==
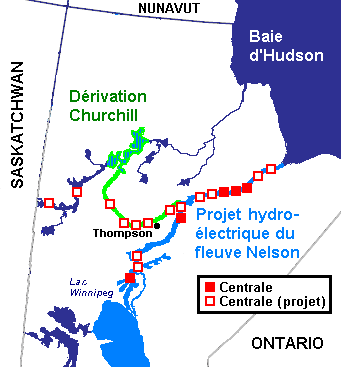
Hydroelectrical complex on Churchill and Nelson rivers

=== Location and boundary ===
- Area: 250,946 mi^{2} / 649,950 km^{2}
- Land surface: 211721 mi^{2} / 548,360 km^{2}
- North to south: 761 miles / 1225 km
- Width (south): 279 miles / 449 km
- North boundary (width): 260 miles / 418 km
- Coastline: 400 miles / 645 km
- Water surface: 39,225 mi^{2} / 101,593 km^{2}
- Widest point: 493 miles / 793 km

=== Population ===
- Total population 1,272,000 (2014)
- Population density 1.78 people/km^{2} (ranked 5th among Canadian provinces and territories)

== See also ==
- Geography of Canada
- List of highest points of Canadian provinces and territories

== Line note references ==
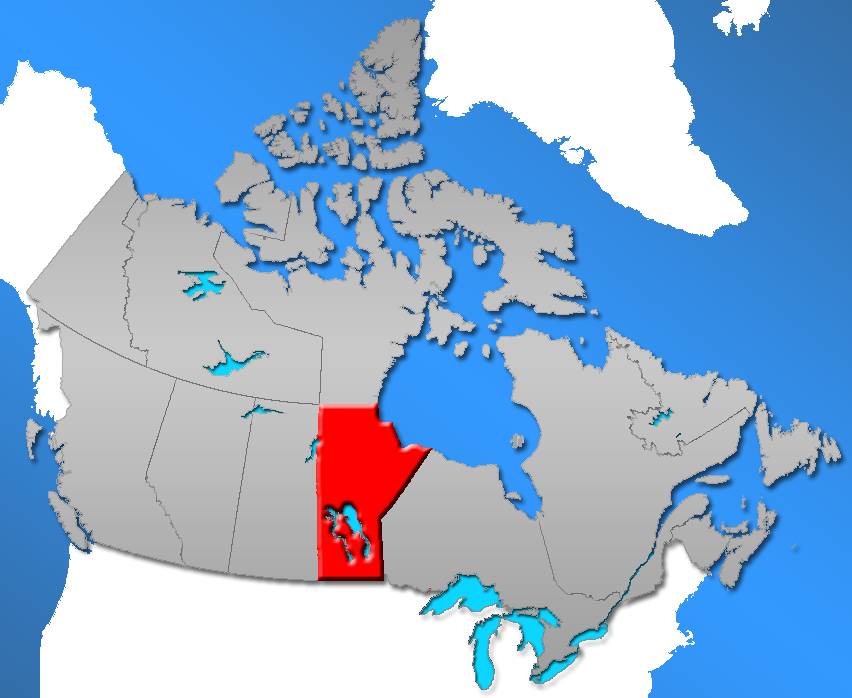
Location of Manitoba in Canada
