= Midnight Creek =

River in Saskatchewan, Canada

- Location of the mouth in Saskatchewan Midnight Creek (Canada)

Location
- Country: Canada
- Provinces: Saskatchewan

Physical characteristics
- Source
  - location: Porcupine Hills
  - coordinates: 52.5663°N 101.8732°W
  - elevation: 749 m (2,457 ft)
- Mouth: Elbow Lake
  - location: Porcupine Hills Provincial Park
  - coordinates: 52.4900°N 101.7171°W
  - elevation: 689 m (2,260 ft)

Basin features
- River system: Nelson River
- Tributaries
  - left: Island Creek

Midnight Creek is a river in the Canadian province of Saskatchewan. The river begins in the heart of the Porcupine Hills and of the Manitoba Escarpment and heads in a generally south-east direction through the Porcupine Provincial Forest before emptying into Elbow Lake. A short river connects Elbow Lake to Woody Lake, which is the source for Woody River. Highway 980 follows the river for much of its course.

Midnight Creek travels through boreal forest, muskeg, and connects many lakes of Porcupine Hills Provincial Park including Isbister, Spirit, Island, and Elbow Lakes. Halliday, Isbister, and Midnight Lakes are along the river's course. Island Creek, which comes from Island and Spirit Lakes, meets up with Midnight Creek just upstream from Midnight Lake.

== See also ==
- List of rivers of Saskatchewan
- Tourism in Saskatchewan
- Hudson Bay drainage basin
