= Woody Lake (Saskatchewan) =

Lake in Saskatchewan, Canada

- Location in Saskatchewan Woody Lake (Canada)
- Location: Porcupine Hills Provincial Park, Saskatchewan
- Coordinates: 52.4716°N 101.6999°W
- Part of: Nelson River drainage basin
- Primary outflows: Woody River
- Basin countries: Canada
- Surface area: 124.5 ha (308 acres)
- Max. depth: 3.82 m (12.5 ft)
- Water volume: 2,109 dam^{3} (1,710 acre⋅ft)
- Shore length^{1}: 8.66 km (5.38 mi)
- Surface elevation: 691 m (2,267 ft)
- Settlements: None
- ^{1} Shore length is not a well-defined measure.

Woody Lake is a lake in the Canadian province of Saskatchewan. It is located in the east-central part of the province in the Porcupine Hills and Porcupine Provincial Forest. The entire lake is in the Woody River Block of Porcupine Hills Provincial Park. Highway 980 provides access to the lake.

Woody Lake is the source of Woody River. The lake's outflow is controlled by the 2.6-metre (8 ft 6 in) Woody Lake Weir. The weir was built in 1978 and then upgraded in 1998. It is owned and operated by the Saskatchewan Water Security Agency. Woody River is a river that flows south then east into neighbouring Manitoba and Swan Lake. The main inflow for Woody Lake is a short River that flows south from Elbow Lake, which is fed by Midnight Creek. On the western end of Woody Lake, another short river flows into it from neighbouring Townsend Lake.

== Parks and recreation ==
Prior to the formation of Porcupine Hills Provincial Park in 2018, the parkland around Woody Lake was a provincial recreation site called Woody River Recreation Site. Access to the lake is at the north-western shore and amenities include a boat launch, picnic area, and fish cleaning station.

== Fish species ==
Fish commonly found in the lake include walleye, perch, and northern pike.

== See also ==
- List of lakes of Saskatchewan
- Tourism in Saskatchewan
