= Armit Meadows Ecological Reserve =

Protected area in Manitoba, Canada

- IUCN category Ia (strict nature reserve)
- Interactive map of Armit Meadows Ecological Reserve
- Coordinates: 52°39′N 101°35′W
- Area: 263 ha (650 acres)
- Established: 2015

Armit Meadows Ecological Reserve is an ecological reserve located in Porcupine Provincial Forest, Manitoba, Canada. It was established in 2015 under the Manitoba Ecological Reserves Act. It is 2.63 square kilometres (1.02 sq mi) in size.

== Geography ==
Armit Meadows Ecological Reserve is located about 30 kilometres (19 mi) northwest of Swan River, Manitoba near the Manitoba Saskatchewan border.

The reserve is situated within the Porcupine Hills, the northernmost area of hills associated with the Manitoba Escarpment within Manitoba. The hills lie within the eastern portion of the Western Canadian Sedimentary Basin in an area where the Souris River Formation overlays the Precambrian bedrock. This layer of shale and limestone was deposited by a shallow sea during the Devonian period. The bedrock underneath the hills is higher than in the surrounding region. During the Quaternary period, when the ice sheets advanced and retreated, these raised areas of bedrock snagged more glacial till than their surroundings, further increasing their height.

The reserve contains part of the course of the Armit River as it flows north through the Armit River Canyon. This canyon cuts through the layers of glacial till and the Devonian sediments creating substantial cliffs parallel to the river.

== Ecology ==
The reserve protects the riparian zone of the Armit River and the adjacent uplands containing spruce forest, sphagnum meadows and fescue prairie. This area marks the most northerly location of fescue prairie in Manitoba.

Fescue bunchgrasses found in the reserve provide winter forage for elk.

Leatherleaf and cottongrass bloom in dry sphagnum meadows within the reserve.

The reserve is within the Porcupine Hills Ecodistrict in the Mid-Boreal Uplands Ecoregion within the Boreal Plains Ecozone. This eco-district has significant forested areas with mixed stands of white spruce and balsam fir. Trembling aspen, balsam poplar, and jack pine are found on drier sites. Black spruce and tamarack grow in poorly drained areas.

== See also ==
- List of ecological reserves in Manitoba
- List of protected areas of Manitoba
