= Armit Lake =

Lake in Western Canada

- Location in Manitoba Armit Lake (Canada)
- Location: Parkland Region, Manitoba; RM of Hudson Bay No. 394, Saskatchewan
- Coordinates: 52.5486°N 101.5858°W
- Part of: Nelson River drainage basin
- River sources: Porcupine Hills
- Primary outflows: Armit River
- Basin countries: Canada
- Max. length: 8.5 km (5.3 mi)
- Max. width: 7.2 km (4.5 mi)
- Surface area: 2,631 ha (6,500 acres)
- Max. depth: 17.1 m (56 ft)
- Shore length^{1}: 40 km (25 mi)
- Surface elevation: 725 m (2,379 ft)
- Islands: Jim Wright Island
- Settlements: None
- ^{1} Shore length is not a well-defined measure.

Armit Lake is a lake in the Canadian provinces of Manitoba and Saskatchewan. The lake is about 50 kilometres (31 mi) north-northwest of Swan River, Manitoba, 62 kilometres (39 mi) east-southeast of Hudson Bay, Saskatchewan, and is situated in the Porcupine Hills of the Manitoba Escarpment. Most of the lake is in Manitoba with only the very western end across the border into Saskatchewan. With no public roads going to the lake, it is notoriously difficult to get to.

== Description ==
At 2,631 hectares (6,500 acres), Armit Lake is the largest lake in the Porcupine Hills. The lake's outflow, Armit River, flows north into Red Deer Lake. Red Deer Lake is along the course of the Red Deer River which begins in Saskatchewan and ends at Lake Winnipegosis in Manitoba.

It is a remote lake with no communities along its shores and no public roads going to it. Access is from a 32.5-kilometre (20.2 mi) long ATV trail that begins at Manitoba Provincial Road 365 and from another ATV trail that begins at Spirit Lake in Saskatchewan's Porcupine Hills Provincial Park.

== Fish species ==
Fish commonly found in Armit Lake include walleye, northern pike, yellow perch, burbot, lake whitefish, and tullibee.

== See also ==
- List of lakes of Manitoba
- List of lakes of Saskatchewan
