= Townsend Lake =

Lake in Saskatchewan, Canada

- Location in Saskatchewan Townsend Lake (Canada)
- Location: Porcupine Hills Provincial Park, Saskatchewan
- Coordinates: 52.4828°N 101.7385°W
- Part of: Nelson River drainage basin
- Catchment area: Woody River
- Basin countries: Canada
- Surface area: 173.5 ha (429 acres)
- Max. depth: 10.4 m (34 ft)
- Shore length^{1}: 7.2 km (4.5 mi)
- Surface elevation: 691 m (2,267 ft)
- ^{1} Shore length is not a well-defined measure.

Townsend Lake is a lake in the Canadian province of Saskatchewan. It is located in the east-central part of the province in the Porcupine Hills and Porcupine Provincial Forest. The lake is in the Woody River Block of Porcupine Hills Provincial Park. Highway 980 provides access to the east side of the lake and its amenities. Several small creeks feed into the lake from the surrounding hills, lakes, and muskeg. The outflow is a short river at the eastern end of the lake that flows into the western end of Woody Lake.

The lake is named in memory of Flight Sergeant Robert Wilfred Ernest Townsend who died fighting in World War II on 29 July 1944. Since 1947 Saskatchewan started naming lakes after fallen soldiers and now there are more than 4,000 such lakes in the province.

== Parks and recreation ==
Prior to the formation of Porcupine Hills Provincial Park in 2018, the parkland around Townsend Lake was a provincial recreation site called Woody River Recreation Site. The recreation site has a campground with 33 campsites, a boat launch, two fish cleaning stations, and a picnic area.

Moose Range Lodge, located on the northern shore of the lake, is an outfitters with modern cabins, boat rentals, fuel, and a restaurant. In the winter, the lodge is the centre for snowmobiling in the park.

== Fish species ==
Fish commonly found in the lake include walleye, perch, and northern pike.

== See also ==
- List of lakes of Saskatchewan
- Tourism in Saskatchewan
