= Whitefish Lake (Manitoba) =

Lake in Manitoba, Canada

- Location of the lake in Manitoba Whitefish Lake (Canada)
- Location: Manitoba
- Coordinates: 52°20′N 101°36′W
- Primary inflows: Little Fish Creek; Rock Creek
- Primary outflows: Whitefish Creek
- Catchment area: Woody River
- Basin countries: Canada
- Surface area: 712 ha (1,760 acres)
- Average depth: 8.1 m (27 ft)
- Max. depth: 18.9 m (62 ft)
- Surface elevation: 579 m (1,900 ft)
- Settlements: None

Whitefish Lake is a lake in the Canadian province of Manitoba. It is on the western side of the province immediately east of the border with Saskatchewan in the Porcupine Hills of the Manitoba Escarpment. The lake is in Manitoba's Porcupine Provincial Forest, which is a boreal forest. Accessed is on the east side from Provincial Road 279.

Several small creeks from the surrounding hills, muskeg, and smaller lakes feed into Whitefish Lake. Whitefish Creek is the outflow. It is located on the western side of the lake and flows west into Saskatchewan and then into Woody River. Woody River works itself south then back east into Manitoba and eventually empties into Swan Lake. The whole system is in the Nelson River watershed, which flows into the Hudson Bay.

== Parks and recreation ==
Whitefish Lake Provincial Park is a provincial park on the eastern shore of Whitefish Lake. The park has 81 unserviced campsites and 29 cottages as well as lake access for fishing, swimming, and other watersports. The area also has picnic sites and hiking trails.

== Fish species ==
Fish commonly found in Whitefish Lake include walleye, northern pike, yellow perch, lake whitefish, cisco, and burbot.

== See also ==
- List of lakes of Manitoba
