= Roaring River (Manitoba) =

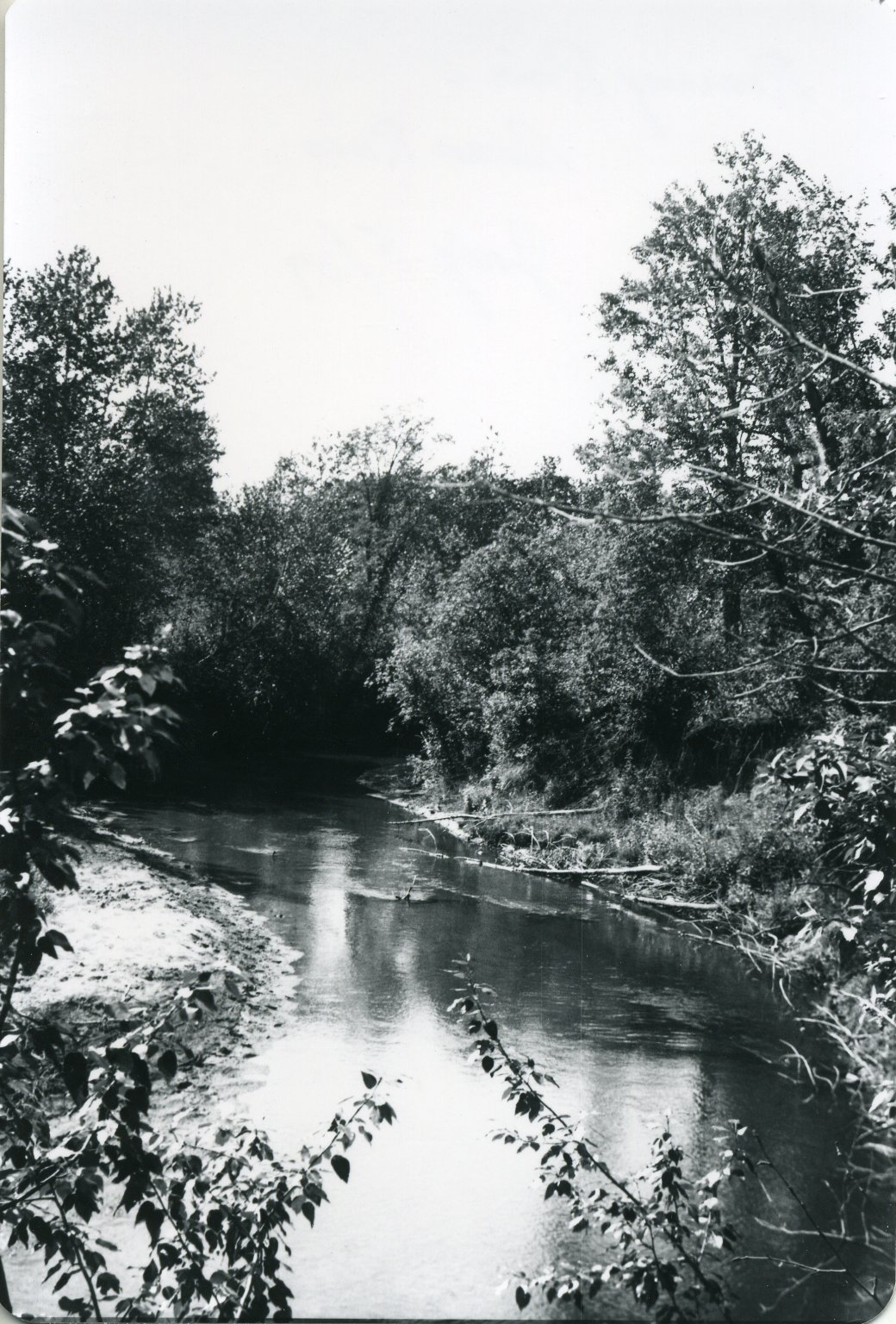
- Section of Roaring River near Swan River, 1937

Location
- Country: Canada
- Region: Western Manitoba

Physical characteristics
- Mouth
  - coordinates: 52.2092000°N 101.0289000°W
  - elevation: 388 m (1,273 ft)
- Length: 15.1 km (9.4 mi)

Basin features
- River system: Swan River

The Roaring River is a right tributary of the Swan River in Manitoba, Canada.

== Geography ==
Manitoba's Duck Mountain is part of the Manitoba Escarpment. It has steep slopes on the north and east sides, with a total relief of about 500 metres (1,600 ft). The mountain is forest-covered, and contains many lakes and streams. The Roaring River drains the north side of the Duck Mountain Provincial Park of Manitoba. It receives the Favel River on its right. It runs northeast until it joins the Swan River from the south. The Swan River continues northeast and discharges into the Swan Lake.

A site along the river has been analyzed for pollen records of the Middle Pleistocene, c. 781 to 126 thousand years ago. It shows a sequence from a cool climate with boreal forest, to a warm climate with grassland and then oak savanna, and then a return to boreal forest.

== Hydrology ==
Usually there is less than 600 millimetres (24 in) of precipitation per year, one third of which falls as snow in the winter. A gauge near Minitonas records highly variable flows from one year to another, averaging about 66,000 cubic metres (2,300,000 cu ft). Most of the flow (about 60%) occurs during the spring run-off from April to May, as the snow in the watershed melts. The flow tapers off during the summer and fall.

== History ==
Settlement of the region began in 1899 with the completion of the Canadian National Railway to Swan River. The Roaring River School District was organized in October 1902. Until 1951 children were taught in a wood-frame school building in the west of the Rural Municipality of Minitonas. In 1911 Gertrude Twilley (later Gertrude Richardson by marriage) and her mother moved from England to Canada to stay with Gertrude's brother Fred on his homestead in the Roaring River district of Manitoba. The Roaring River Suffrage Association was founded in March 1912, with both men and women as members. Getrude Twilley was president and her sister Fannie Livesey was secretary. They were one of the first suffrage groups in Manitoba.

== Sources ==
- Goldsborough, Gordon (2014-08-29). "Roaring River School No. 1215 (RM of Minitonas)". Manitoba Historical Society.
- Graham, Alan (1999-02-25). Late Cretaceous and Cenozoic History of North American Vegetation : North of Mexico: North of Mexico. Oxford University Press. ISBN 978-0-19-534437-0.
- Gutkin, Harry; Gutkin, Mildred (Autumn 1996). ""Give us our due!" How Manitoba Women Won the Vote". Manitoba History (32).
- Richea, Nathen (2010). "Reconstructing the historical stream flow from stream morphology in Duck Mountain, Manitoba" (PDF). Prairie Perspectives.
- "Swan Lake IWMP Surface Water Hydrology Report" (PDF). Government of Manitoba. 2011-07-01.
