= Elbow Lake (Saskatchewan) =

Lake in Saskatchewan, Canada

- Location in Saskatchewan Elbow Lake (Canada)
- Location: Porcupine Hills Provincial Park, Saskatchewan
- Coordinates: 52.4851°N 101.7099°W
- Part of: Nelson River drainage basin
- Primary inflows: Midnight Creek
- River sources: Porcupine Hills
- Basin countries: Canada
- Surface area: 147.9 ha (365 acres)
- Max. depth: 15.6 m (51 ft)
- Shore length^{1}: 13.6 km (8.5 mi)
- Surface elevation: 691 m (2,267 ft)
- Settlements: Elbow Lake
- ^{1} Shore length is not a well-defined measure.

Elbow Lake is a lake in the Canadian province of Saskatchewan. It is located in the east-central part of the province at the terminus of Midnight Creek in the Porcupine Hills and Porcupine Provincial Forest. The lake is in the Woody River Block of Porcupine Hills Provincial Park and is situated in boreal forest surrounded by hills, other small lakes, and muskeg. The small community of Elbow Lake is located at the north-west corner and Highway 980 provides access to it and the lake.

== Description ==
Prior to the formation of Porcupine Hills Provincial Park in 2018, the parkland around Elbow Lake was a provincial recreation site called Woody River Recreation Site. The Elbow Lake's primary inflow, Midnight Creek, enters the lake at the north-west corner beside the community of Elbow Lake. To the west of Elbow Lake is Stark Lake which is connected by a short stream. A stream from Spirit Lake enters along the northern shore and at the southern end of the lake. The outflow is a short river that flows out from the southern shore into Woody Lake, which is the source of the Woody River.

== Fish species ==
Fish commonly found in Elbow Lake include walleye, perch, and northern pike.

== See also ==
- List of lakes of Saskatchewan
- Tourism in Saskatchewan
