= McBride Lake =

Lake in Saskatchewan, Canada

- Location in Saskatchewan McBride Lake (Canada)
- Location: RM of Hudson Bay No. 394, Saskatchewan
- Coordinates: 52.4501°N 102.4171°W
- Part of: Nelson River drainage basin
- Primary inflows: Pepaw River
- Primary outflows: Pepaw River
- Basin countries: Canada
- Surface area: 187.8 ha (464 acres)
- Max. depth: 7.62 m (25.0 ft)
- Shore length^{1}: 15.8 km (9.8 mi)
- Surface elevation: 481 m (1,578 ft)
- ^{1} Shore length is not a well-defined measure.

McBride Lake is a lake in the east-central part of the Canadian province of Saskatchewan in the boreal forest ecozone of Canada. It is a narrow lake that runs west to east along the course of the Pepaw River known for its fishing and recreational opportunities. It is situated in the Porcupine Hills and within Saskatchewan's Porcupine Provincial Forest. There is a provincial park and a small subdivision along the lake's shore and access is from Highway 983. Eldredge Lake is upstream from McBride Lake along the course of the Pepaw River and Pepaw Lake is downstream. Swallow lake is to the north and a short stream flows from Swallow Lake into the eastern end of McBride Lake.

Along the northern shore of the lake is McBride Lake Recreation Site, which is one of five blocks that make up Porcupine Hills Provincial Park. Until 2018, the recreation site was a stand-alone park. At that time McBride Lake and four other recreation sites were merged into one to create Porcupine Hills Provincial Park. The campground in the park has 51 campsites.

== Fish species ==
Fish commonly found in the lake include northern pike, walleye, and yellow perch.

== See also ==
- List of lakes of Saskatchewan
- List of protected areas of Saskatchewan
- Tourism in Saskatchewan
