= Pepaw River =

River in Saskatchewan, Canada

Pepaw River Peepaw River
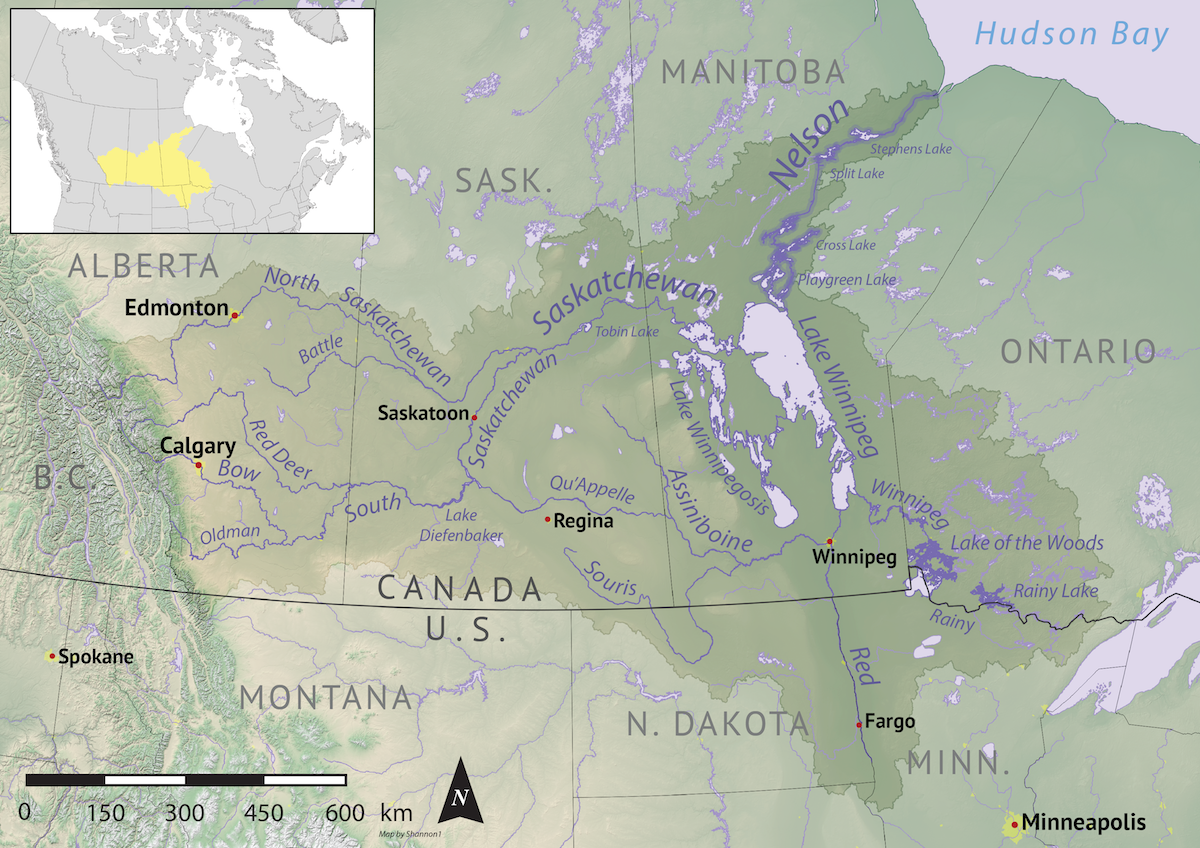
- Nelson River drainage basin

- Location of the mouth in Saskatchewan Pepaw River (Canada)

Location
- Country: Canada
- Provinces: Saskatchewan
- Rural municipality: RM of Hudson Bay No. 394

Physical characteristics
- Source
  - location: Porcupine Hills
  - coordinates: 52.3570°N 102.5177°W
  - elevation: 599 m (1,965 ft)
- Mouth: Etomami River
  - coordinates: 52.6730°N 102.3730°W
  - elevation: 386 m (1,266 ft)

Basin features
- River system: Red Deer River

Pepaw River, also spelt Peepaw, is a river in the east-central part of the Canadian province of Saskatchewan in the boreal forest ecozone of Canada. It begins in the Porcupine Hills and flows northward and meets up with the Etomami River south of the town of Hudson Bay. Much of the river is within Saskatchewan's Porcupine Provincial Forest and as such has various recreational opportunities along its course.

Pepaw River and its amenities are accessed from three different highways. The part of the river that runs west to east past McBride Lake is paralleled by Highway 983 and the north flowing leg at the lower end of the river is paralleled by Highway 982, also known as Little Swan Road. Highway 9 crosses the river near its mouth.

== River's course ==
The course of the Pepaw River takes it through boreal forest, muskeg, glacier-formed valleys, and several lakes. The river begins at a small unnamed lake in the Porcupine Hills and flows north through forest and rolling hills before flowing into a valley and emptying into the western end of the narrow Eldredge Lake.

This valley runs in an east-west direction and to the west of where Pepaw River flows into the valley, is a portage to the Etomami River. At the eastern end of the lake, the Pepaw River continues and follows the valley and empties into McBride Lake. From the eastern end of McBride Lake, the river continues eastward through the valley until the east-west valley meets a north-south valley. To the south is Pepaw Lake and a portage to the Swan River and to the north, the Pepaw River continues and empties into Saginas Lake.

A short distance downstream from Saginas Lake there is a small earthen dam (52.5324°N 102.2547°W) designed to increase the lake's water level for improved fish habitat. Continuing north from the dam, Pepaw River leaves the Porcupine Hills and meets up with the Etomami River near the intersection of Highway 9 and Little Swan Road and Dagg Creek Recreation Site.

== Parks and recreation ==
Three of the five sites that make up Porcupine Hills Provincial Park are along the course of Pepaw River. These sites include McBride Lake Recreation Site, Pepaw Lake Recreation Site, and Saginas Lake Recreation Site. At the mouth of Pepaw River is another recreation site called Dagg Creek Recreation Site, which is part of Hudson Bay Regional Park. These parks offer a variety of activities including camping, fishing, hiking, boating, and picnicking.

== Fish species ==
Fish commonly found in the river include northern pike and walleye.

== See also ==
- List of rivers of Saskatchewan
- Tourism in Saskatchewan
- Hudson Bay drainage basin
