= Spirit Lake (Saskatchewan) =

Lake in Saskatchewan, Canada

- Location in Saskatchewan Spirit Lake (Canada)
- Location: Porcupine Hills Provincial Park, Saskatchewan
- Coordinates: 52.514°N 101.685°W
- Part of: Nelson River drainage basin
- Primary outflows: Island Creek
- Basin countries: Canada
- Surface area: 337.4 ha (834 acres)
- Max. depth: 14.03 m (46.0 ft)
- Shore length^{1}: 12.6 km (7.8 mi)
- Surface elevation: 745 m (2,444 ft)
- ^{1} Shore length is not a well-defined measure.

Spirit Lake is a lake in the Canadian province of Saskatchewan. It is located in the east-central part of the province in the Porcupine Hills and Porcupine Provincial Forest. The lake is part of the Woody River Block of Porcupine Hills Provincial Park and is situated in boreal forest surrounded by hills, other small lakes, and muskeg. Access to the lake is on the southern side from Spirit Lake Road which branches off Highway 980.

== Description ==
Spirit Lake is a bifurcation lake meaning it has two outflows. At the southern end is a small creek that flows south out of the lake and into neighbouring Elbow Lake. The main outflow is to the north into Island Lake and then into Midnight Creek via Island Creek. To the east of the lake is Spirit Mountain, which rises almost 800 metres (2,600 ft) above sea level. To the north-east of Spirit Mountain, Island Lake, and Spirit Lake is Armit Lake, which, other than the western most point, is entirely within the province of Manitoba. Armit lake, which is the largest in the Porcupine Hills, can be accessed from a rough ATV trail that begins at Spirit Lake.

At the southern end of Spirit Lake is a campground with lake access. There are no communities nor other amenities on the lake.

== Parks and recreation ==
Prior to the formation of Porcupine Hills Provincial Park in 2018, the park on Smallfish Lake was part of a provincial recreation site called Woody River Recreation Site. At this site there is a small campground, boat launch, picnic area, fish cleaning station, and lake access. The ATV trail to Armit Lake begins at the campground.

== Fish species ==
Fish commonly found in the lake include walleye, perch, white sucker, and northern pike.

== See also ==
- List of lakes of Saskatchewan
- Tourism in Saskatchewan
