= Saskatchewan Highway 981 =

Provincial highway in Saskatchewan, Canada

Highway 981

Route information
- Maintained by Ministry of Highways and Infrastructure
- Length: 22 km (14 mi)

Major junctions
- East end: Highway 980 south of Armit
- West end: Township Road 441

Location
- Country: Canada
- Province: Saskatchewan

Highway system
- Provincial highways in Saskatchewan
← Highway 980	→ Highway 982

Highway 981 is a provincial highway in the east central region of the Canadian province of Saskatchewan. It runs from Highway 980 until it transitions to Township Road 441. It is about 22 kilometres (14 mi) long.

Highway 981 lies entirely within the Porcupine Provincial Forest in the Porcupine Hills and provides access to Porcupine Hills Provincial Park.

== See also ==
- Roads in Saskatchewan
- Transportation in Saskatchewan
- List of highways numbered 981
