= Isbister Lake =

Lake in Saskatchewan, Canada

- Location in Saskatchewan Isbister Lake (Canada)
- Location: Porcupine Hills Provincial Park, Saskatchewan
- Coordinates: 52.5333°N 101.7671°W
- Part of: Nelson River drainage basin
- Primary inflows: Midnight Creek
- River sources: Porcupine Hills
- Primary outflows: Midnight Creek
- Basin countries: Canada
- Surface area: 33.6 ha (83 acres)
- Max. depth: 3.7 m (12 ft)
- Shore length^{1}: 6.13 km (3.81 mi)
- Surface elevation: 703 m (2,306 ft)
- Settlements: None
- ^{1} Shore length is not a well-defined measure.

Isbister Lake is a lake in the Canadian province of Saskatchewan. It is situated in the east-central part of the province along the course of Midnight Creek in the Porcupine Hills and Porcupine Provincial Forest. The lake is in the Woody River Block of Porcupine Hills Provincial Park. Highway 980 provides access to the southern shore of the lake and its amenities. Isbister Lake is situated in boreal forest and surrounded by hills, other small lakes, and muskeg.

The lake was named in memory of Rifleman Archie Isbister of the Regina Rifle Regiment who died on 6 June 1944 fighting in World War II. Since 1947 Saskatchewan has been naming lakes after fallen soldiers and there are now more than 4,000 such lakes in the province.

== Parks and recreation ==
Prior to the formation of Porcupine Hills Provincial Park in 2018, the parkland around Isbister Lake was a provincial recreation site called Woody River Recreation Site. At Isbister Lake, there is a small campground, dock, fish cleaning station, and picnic tables.

== Fish species ==
Fish commonly found in the lake include northern pike, perch, and walleye.

== See also ==
- List of lakes of Saskatchewan
- Tourism in Saskatchewan
