= Saskatchewan Highway 980 =

Provincial highway in Saskatchewan, Canada

Highway 980

Route information
- Maintained by Ministry of Highways and Infrastructure
- Length: 85 km (53 mi)

Major junctions
- North end: Highway 3 near Armit
- Highway 981
- South end: Range Road 1304

Location
- Country: Canada
- Province: Saskatchewan

Highway system
- Provincial highways in Saskatchewan
← Highway 970	→ Highway 981

Highway 980 is a provincial highway in the east central region of the Canadian province of Saskatchewan. It runs from Highway 3 near Armit until it transitions into Range Road 1304 at its southern terminus but not before passing through the Woody River Recreation Site and the community of Elbow Lake. It also connects with Highway 981. It is about 53 kilometres (33 mi) long.

Highway 980 traverses the Porcupine Provincial Forest in the Porcupine Hills and it is the main access to several lakes including Townsend, Isbister, Elbow, Spirit, Smallfish, and Woody. The highway follows Woody River, Midnight Creek, and Little Armit River for much of its route through the Porcupine Hills.

== See also ==
- Roads in Saskatchewan
- Transportation in Saskatchewan
