= Erwood, Saskatchewan =

Community in Saskatchewan, Canada

Coordinates: 52°51′25″N 102°11′03″W

Erwood is a hamlet in the Rural Municipality of Hudson Bay No. 394 in Saskatchewan, Canada. It is on the east bank of the Red Deer River along Highway 3. Highway 981 connects to Highway 3 on the east side of town.

Erwood has an outfitting business (for guided hunting), a community centre, and a Church of God.

== Demographics ==
In the 2021 Census of Population conducted by Statistics Canada, Erwood had a population of 35 living in 18 of its 30 total private dwellings, a change of −30% from its 2016 population of 50. With a land area of 0.44 km^{2} (0.17 sq mi), it had a population density of 79.5/km^{2} (206.0/sq mi) in 2021.

== Railway ==
In 1890, the Canadian Northern Railway began building a line north from Swan River with the intention of reaching the Hudson Bay. They started building the line in the narrow corridor between the Porcupine Hills and Lake Winnipegosis, but instead decided to turn west into the North-West Territories where the logging industry was developing.

By 1900, the line was terminated at E.R. Wood, which later became known as Erwood. From 1903 to 1905, the line was extended west to Melfort.

From 1907 to 1910, another rail line was built to connect the Erwood–Melfort line to The Pas, Manitoba. The two rail lines intersected at Etomami River, which was later renamed Hudson Bay Junction, because the new line to The Pas was intended to continue to the shores of the Hudson Bay.

== Lumber mills ==
Several sawmills existed around Erwood throughout the early 20th century. Between the 1920s and 1940s, corporate sawmills were owned by Dart Lumber Company and Dovich Brothers, and private sawmills were owned by P.E. Sturby and Nick Ukrainetz.

== Church of God ==
The Church of God in Erwood has been operating since the 1920s. The services were originally conducted in Russian, due to the large number of Belarusian, Russian, and Ukrainian immigrants in the area. Today, the services take place on Sunday mornings in English. The church also supports a summer camp at Greenwater Lake Provincial Park.

== See also ==
- List of communities in Saskatchewan
