= Elizabeth Losey =

American biologist and environmentalist

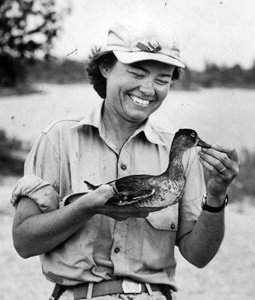
- Betty Losey doing field work at Seney National Wildlife Refuge.
- Born: Elizabeth Brown Beard; December 25, 1912; East Orange, New Jersey
- Died: 2005 (aged 92–93)
- Education: University of Michigan
- Occupations: Conservationist; Refuge biologist

Elizabeth Brown Losey (née Beard) (December 25, 1912 – 2005) was an American conservationist who is recognized as being the first female refuge biologist.

== Education ==
Losey was born in East Orange, New Jersey on December 25, 1912. She went to high school in Lynn, Massachusetts. She graduated from the University of Michigan with a degree in wildlife management and conservation in 1946. Initially, Losey could not find work because she was a woman. She worked as a research assistant for the University of Michigan until 1952. She created a series of teaching aids in wildlife management, including the Outline of upland game bird management (1947).

== Career ==
In 1947 she was employed by the United States Fish and Wildlife Service as a biologist at Seney National Wildlife Refuge. Her assignment was to understand the importance of beavers in waterfowl management. Losey was the first woman research biologist in the country. She quit when she was told she was being transferred West, as by that time "romance had crept in". She was only employed by the agency for three years, but built up a successful career as an ornithologist. Rachel Carson recognized Losey's preparations for a manuscript on trumpeter swans as "an excellent job of organizing the material for an effective story". In 1964 she published her observation of duck broods at the Seney National Wildlife Refuge.

Losey travelled America and Canada taking photographs of fur trading posts and collecting Native American art, which was later donated to the DeVos Art Museum in Michigan. Losey wrote two books. Let Them Be Remembered: The Story of the Fur Trade Forts, the story of the Hudson's Bay Company and the 1600 fur trade, was published in 1999. Her second, Seney National Wildlife Refuge: its story, was published in 2003. She remained a volunteer at Seney National Wildlife Refuge until her death in 2005. She wrote her final peer-reviewed paper at the age of 92 on the history of the Sharp-tailed Grouse, which was published after her death. She was a lifetime sponsor of Delta Waterfowl Foundation. She is regarded as a pioneer in gender equality within fieldwork.
