= Porcupine Hills Provincial Park =

Provincial park in Saskatchewan, Canada

- IUCN category V (protected landscape/seascape)
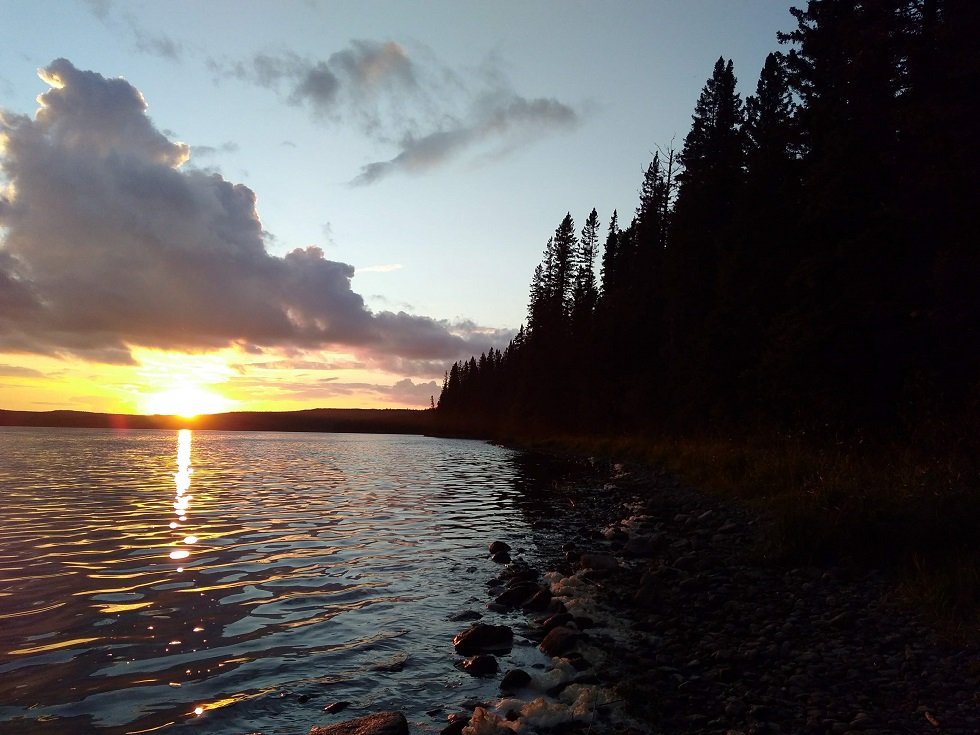
- Townsend Lake

- Location within Saskatchewan Location within Canada
- Location: Saskatchewan, Canada
- Nearest city: Hudson Bay
- Coordinates: 52°27′33″N 102°22′55″W
- Established: 2018
- Governing body: Sask Parks

Porcupine Hills Provincial Park is the newest provincial park in the Canadian Province of Saskatchewan. It was created in 2018 through the amalgamation of five pre-existing provincial recreation sites south-east of the town of Hudson Bay. The park is in the Porcupine Provincial Forest in the Porcupine Hills, which is a geographical feature in eastern Saskatchewan and western Manitoba. The hills are part of a range of hills called the Manitoba Escarpment.

Initial consultation for the creating of the park began in 2011 with local First Nations, Métis people, and other stakeholders to share information, identify concerns, and come up with a name. Porcupine Hills Provincial Park was the overwhelmingly favourite choice.

"Designating this new provincial park is an exciting opportunity for our province," Parks, Culture and Sport Minister Gene Makowsky said. "As an area known for its natural beauty, this new provincial park will ensure it remains available for camping, fishing, hunting and many more of Saskatchewan’s best-known outdoor activities for generations to come."

The park's total area is 29,800 ha (74,000 acres) and is composed of five previously existing recreation parks that were divided between two blocks. The original names for these blocks were Woody River Block and McBride Lake Block. After the creation of the park, these blocks were renamed East Block and West Block with new names to be determined at a later date. The East and West Blocks are quite different in landscape and cultural features with the West Block consisting of open grasslands mixed aspen, birch, and white spruce while the East Block is covered in dense evergreen forests and lakes. The East Block has several campgrounds, a year-round lodge, and a cottage subdivision while the West Block has two campgrounds and three cottage subdivisions. Four of the five original recreation parks are in the West Block. The Woody River Recreation Site plus additional Crown land makes up the East Block.

== West Block (McBride Lake Block) ==
The West Block is composed of four separate recreation sites.

- McBride Lake Recreation Site (52.4582°N 102.3788°W) is on the northern shore of McBride Lake and has a campground with 51 campsites. The site is accessed from Highway 983.
- Pepaw Lake Recreation Site (52.4246°N 102.2174°W) is on the eastern shore of Pepaw Lake and is accessed from Highway 982. The site has lake access with a dock, a picnic area, and a 7.4 kilometre loop trail around the lake.
- Parr Hill Lake Recreation Site (52.3792°N 102.1876°W) is on the north-eastern corner of Parr Hill Lake, just north of Swan River. It is accessed from Highway 982 and features a small campground with 12 campsites, a dock, fish cleaning station, and a picnic area with a shelter.
- Saginas Lake Recreation Site (52.5101°N 102.2288°W) is located on the north-eastern corner of Saginas Lake, right beside Pepaw River. Highway 982 runs along the east side of the site. The site features a small campground, dock, fish cleaning station, beach, and washrooms. It was formally part of Hudson Bay Regional Park.

== East Block (Woody River Block) ==
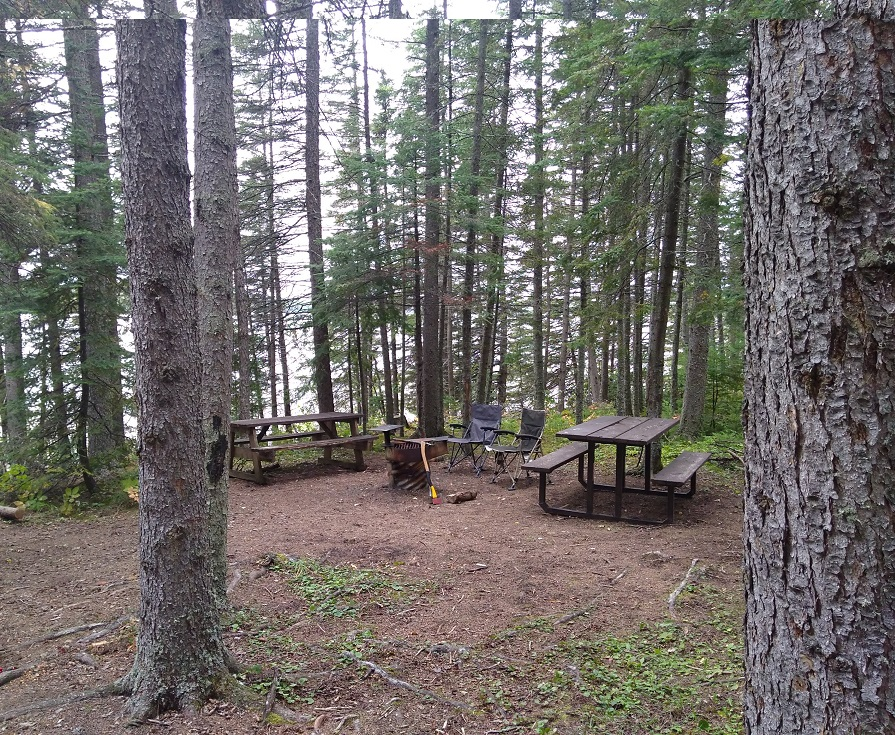
A campsite at Townsend Lake

Woody River Recreation Site (52.4791°N 101.7009°W) consists of separate parcels of land plus additional Crown land centred around several lakes, Woody River, and Midnight Creek in the Porcupine Hills. Access is from Highway 980, which connects all of the lakes and amenities in the park, and by snowmobile. When travelling by snowmobile from the town of Hudson Bay, there are two warm-up shelters along the way. Accessible lakes within the East Block include Isbister, Spirit, Smallfish, Woody, Elbow, and Townsend. All six lakes have boat access and fish commonly found in the lakes include walleye, perch, and northern pike. Campsites and picnic areas exist at Spirit, Isbister, Smallfish, and Townsend Lakes. A rough ATV trail begins at the Spirit Lake Campground and heads north-east past Spirit Mountain and goes to Armit Lake, which is the largest lake in the Porcupine Hills.

Rental cabins are available within the park at Moose Range Lodge on Townsend Lake. The lodge is the centre for snowmobiling in the area and has a restaurant, gasoline, and groceries. The 14-kilometre network of snowmobile trails are maintained by Hudson Bay Trail Riders.

== Flora and fauna ==
Almost 20 different types of trees are found in the boreal forest of Porcupine Provincial Park. Some of the more common evergreen trees include spruce, fir, and pine. Deciduous trees include trembling aspen, balsam poplar, and birch. A variety of birds make the park home including ducks, loons, kingfishers, and grebes. Mammals include wolves, Canada lynx, elk, deer, and black bears.

== See also ==
- List of protected areas of Saskatchewan
- Tourism in Saskatchewan
- Manitoba Escarpment
