= Saskatchewan Highway 984 =

Provincial highway in Saskatchewan, Canada

Highway 984

Route information
- Maintained by Ministry of Highways and Infrastructure
- Length: 18 km (11 mi)

Major junctions
- South end: Dead end south of Piwei River
- Highway 983
- North end: Highway 23 near Somme

Location
- Country: Canada
- Province: Saskatchewan

Highway system
- Provincial highways in Saskatchewan
← Highway 983	→ Highway 994

Highway 984 is a provincial highway in the east central region of the Canadian province of Saskatchewan. It runs from Highway 23 near Somme to a dead end past the Piwei River Recreation Site. The highway connects with Highway 983 and is about 18 kilometres (11 mi) long.

== See also ==
- Roads in Saskatchewan
- Transportation in Saskatchewan
