= Saskatchewan Highway 982 =

Provincial highway in Saskatchewan, Canada

Highway 982
- Little Swan Road

Route information
- Maintained by Ministry of Highways and Infrastructure
- Length: 57 km (35 mi)

Major junctions
- South end: Highway 8 north of Swan Plain
- Highway 983
- North end: Highway 9 south of Hudson Bay

Location
- Country: Canada
- Province: Saskatchewan

Highway system
- Provincial highways in Saskatchewan
← Highway 981	→ Highway 983

Highway 982, also known as Little Swan Road, is a provincial highway in the east central region of the Canadian province of Saskatchewan. It runs from Highway 8 to Highway 9 and is about 57 kilometres (35 mi) long.

Highway 982 travels along the western edge of Porcupine Hills, from near Swan Plain to Highway 9 near where Pepaw River and Etomami River meet. Much of the northern route of the highway follows the Pepaw River. The highway gives access to Porcupine Hills Provincial Park and passes by several lakes, including Saginas Lake, Pepaw Lake, Parr Hill Lake, and Kenney Lake. Highway 982 also connects with Highway 983.

== See also ==
- Roads in Saskatchewan
- Transportation in Saskatchewan
