= Baldy Mountain (Manitoba) =

Highest peak in Manitoba

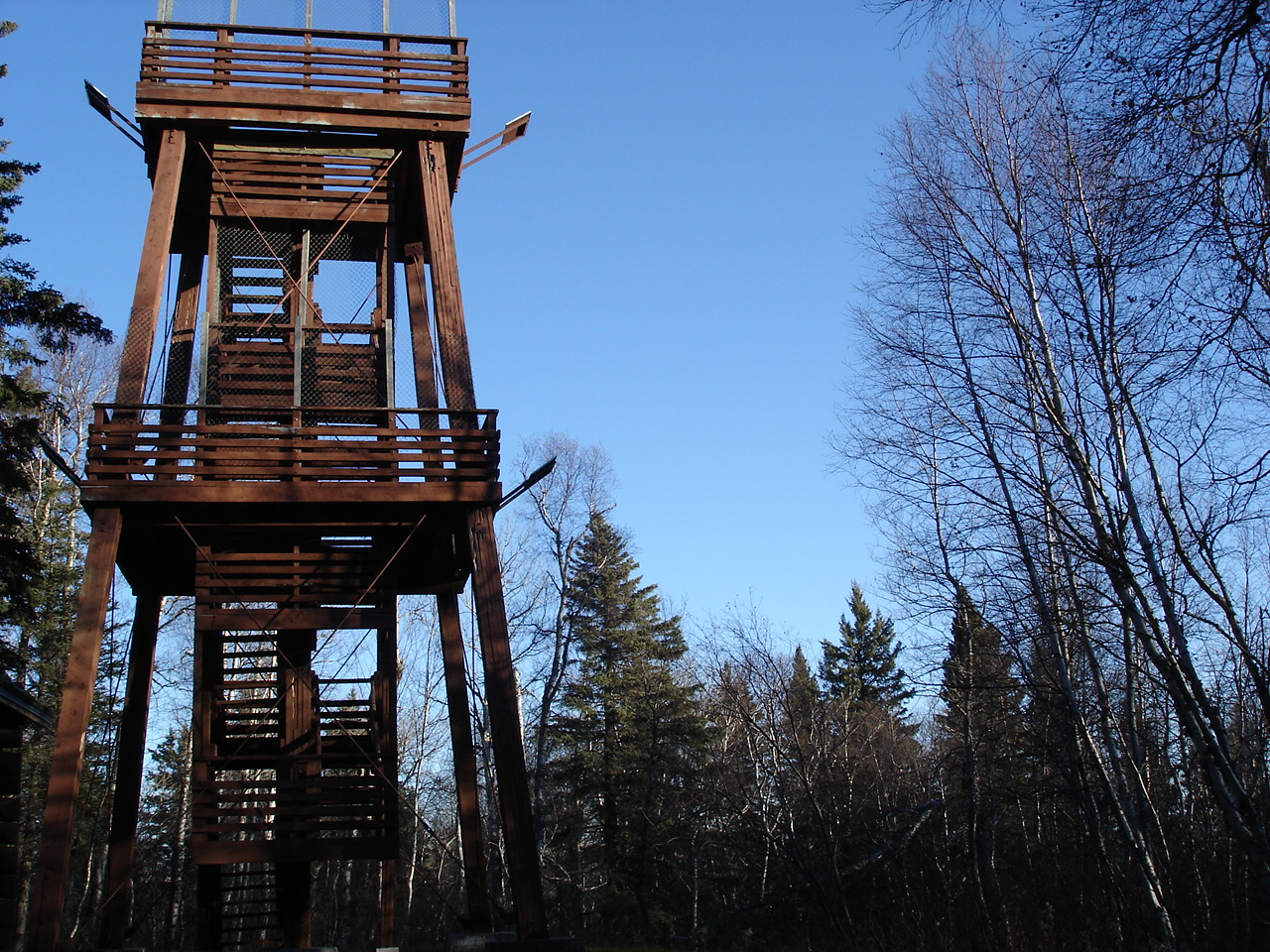
- Observation tower on Baldy Mountain

Highest point
- Elevation: 832 m (2,730 ft)
- Prominence: 381 m (1,250 ft)
- Listing: Mountains of Manitoba; Canadian Subnational High Points 9th
- Coordinates: 51°28′07″N 100°43′42″W

Geography
- Location within Manitoba
- Country: Canada
- Province: Manitoba
- Protected area: Duck Mountain Provincial Park
- Parent range: Manitoba Escarpment
- Topo map: Baldy Mountain 62 N/7 1:50,000

Baldy Mountain is the highest peak in Manitoba, Canada. It is located in the Duck Mountain Provincial Park, North of Grandview. It is 832 metres (2,730 feet) tall, making it the highest peak in the 563-kilometre-long (350-mile) Manitoba Escarpment.
