= Swan Lake (Manitoba) =

Lake in Manitobao, Canada

- Location of the lake in Manitoba Swan Lake (Canada)
- Location: Division No. 19, Manitoba
- Coordinates: 52°31′N 100°45′W
- Primary inflows: Swan River, Woody River
- Catchment area: 3,880 sq mi (10,000 km^{2})
- Basin countries: Canada
- Average depth: 7.5 ft (2.3 m)
- Water volume: 571,200 acre⋅ft (704,600,000 m^{3})
- Surface elevation: 851 ft (259 m)

Swan Lake is a lake located in the Canadian province of Manitoba. The lake, and several other features in the area, are named after the trumpeter swans found in the region.

== Description ==
Swan Lake covers an area of 119 square miles (310 km^{2}), with an average depth of 7.5 feet (2.3 m), giving a contained water volume of 571,200 acre-foot (705,000,000 m^{3}). There is a large marsh complex along the west shore of Swan Lake, near the Swan and Woody Rivers, which is a significant area for migrating birds in the region.

The Swan Lake drainage basin covers 3,880 square miles (10,000 km^{2}) and extends into the province of Saskatchewan. It is located between the Duck Mountains and the Porcupine Hills. Two major rivers discharge into Swan Lake from the basin, the Swan River and the Woody River. Other topographic features include Thunder Hill, the Swan River valley and plain, the two river's many tributaries, and Swan Lake and its surrounding delta wetland area. In addition to Swan Lake, there are approximately 30 smaller lakes in the basin; the major ones being, Lac La Course, Madge Lake, Sarah Lake, Wellman Lake, Whitefish Lake, and Woody Lake. Land elevations vary from 2,600 and 2,300 feet above sea level in the Porcupine Hills and Duck Mountains respectively, to 851 feet above sea level at Swan Lake.

The Porcupine Hills and Duck mountains are forested, as was the majority of the remainder of the basin originally. Explorer Thomas Simpson remarked when travelling through the area in 1837:

The industry of man may, in some future age, convert this wilderness into a habitable land, as the climate is good, and barley, potatoes, and other vegetable produce have been raised at several points along Swan River.

Much of the forest has since been cleared and replaced with agriculture. The area also supports significant forestry, hunting, sport-fishing, tourism, and outdoor recreational activities. Currently 42.7% of the basin is forested, 38.4% is devoted to agriculture, 15.5% is surface water, with the remaining 3.4% unclassified. Wetlands occupy 10% of the basin, mostly bogs and shallow ponds located in the headwater areas of the Duck Mountains and Porcupine Hills, as well as the Swan Lake marsh complex.

Average annual precipitation in the basin is 19 inches. Frost free period ranges from 87 to 110 days. The basin's average annual discharge is approximately 495,000 acre-foot (610,000,000 m^{3}). Of that, up to 5,500 US gallons (21 m^{3}) of water per day are free for domestic use without a water rights licence. Less than 2,000 acre-foot (2,500,000 m^{3}) of annual water rights licences have been approved (2005).

Total population living in the basin is approximately 14,000, the largest component consisting of approximately half of the total being rural residents living outside of major communities. The only communities on the lake itself are the main reserve of the Wuskwi Sipihk First Nation (Swan Lake 65C) and the northern part of the Rural Municipality of Mountain, both on the lake's western shores. The largest community in the basin is Swan River, Manitoba, with a population of 4,032. The remaining communities with the exception of Minitonas, have fewer than 500 residents. These communities are:

In Saskatchewan:

- Arran
- Arabella
- Danbury
- Norquay
- Pelly
- Swan Plain
- Whitebeech

In Manitoba:

- Benito
- Bowsman
- Durban
- Kamsack Beach
- Key Reserve
- Kenville
- Lenswood
- Minitonas
- Novra
- Renwer
- Swan Lake Reserve

== See also ==
- List of lakes of Manitoba
