= Hart Mountain (Manitoba) =

Mountain in Manitoba, Canada

- Location within Manitoba Location within Canada

Highest point
- Elevation: 823 m (2,700 ft)
- Listing: Mountains of Canada
- Coordinates: 52°28′53″N 101°25′27″W

Geography
- Location: Manitoba, Canada
- Parent range: Porcupine Hills

Hart Mountain in Manitoba is the highest peak in the Porcupine Hills of central Canada, with a max elevation of 823 m (2,700 ft). It is aboit 43 kilometres (27 mi) north-northwest of the town of Swan River.
