= Pembina Escarpment =

Coordinates: 50°37′02″N 99°31′35″W

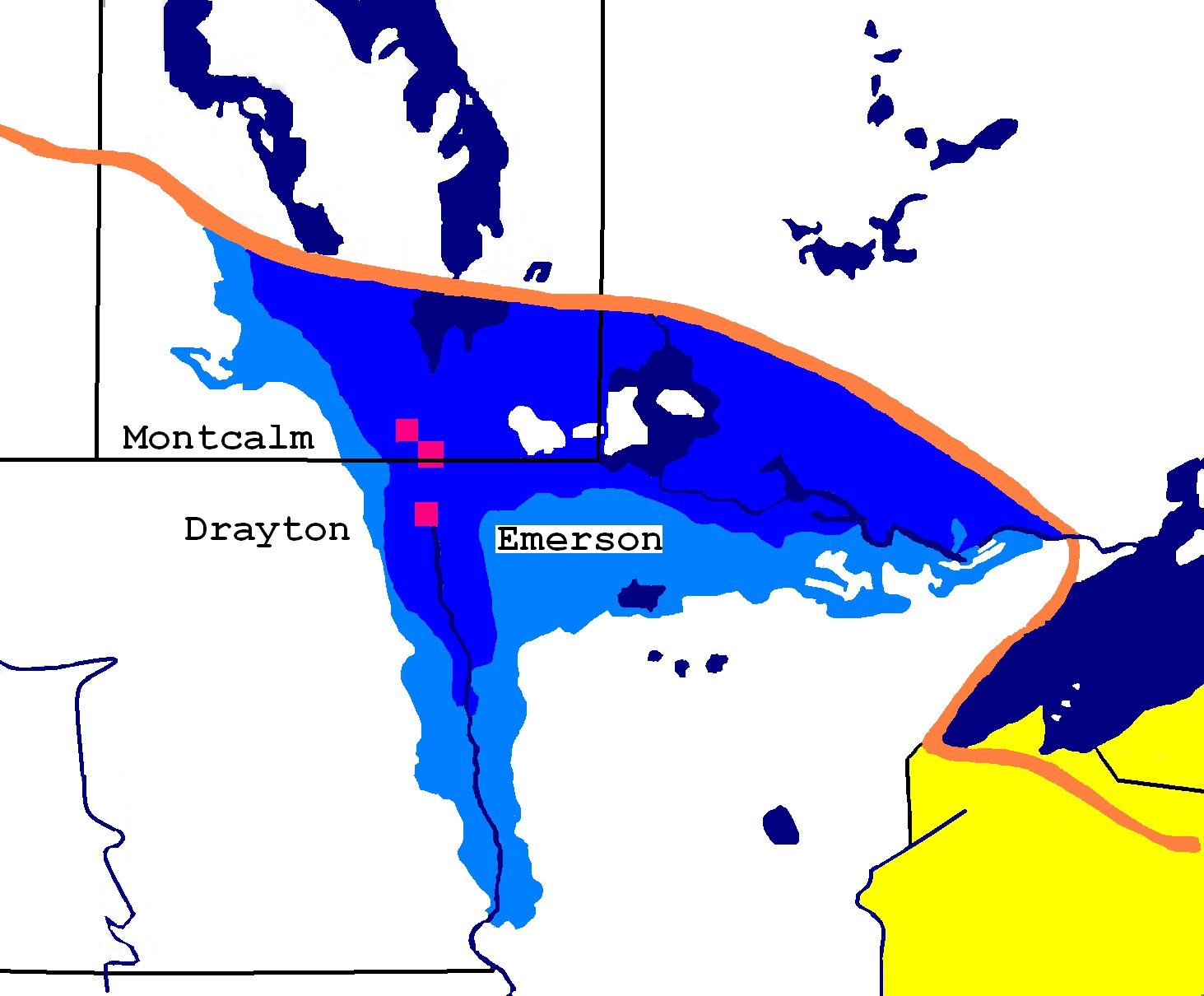
Lockhart Phase of Lake Agassiz approximately 11,500 years ago when the Pembina Escarpment was formed. The area north of the orange line was the Laurentide Ice Sheet.

The Pembina Escarpment is a scarp that runs from South Dakota to Manitoba, and forms the western wall of the Red River Valley. The height of the escarpment above the river valley is 300–400 feet (91–122 m).

== Geology ==
The escarpment was originally formed by the undercutting of Cretaceous sandstones (the Dakota Formation) by the ancestral Red River. The escarpment was later steepened by glacial scouring. The escarpment is preserved due to a layer of erosion-resistant shale (the Pierre Formation) on top of the sandstone. The vista today, of wooded hills with small farms tucked into valleys (such as the Pembina Valley), is reminiscent of pastoral sections of New England. Streams flowing off the escarpment have high gradients and a cobble substrate.

The final form of the escarpment we know today was not created until the end of the last ice age around 12,000 years ago. During the ice age, much of North America was covered by the Laurentide Ice Sheet. As the ice sheet began to melt and recede, the meltwaters filled the ancestral Red River Valley to create Lake Agassiz. The valley walls, including the escarpment to the west, provided east and west boundaries for the lake, and remaining part of the ice sheet provided the northern boundary. During this period of time—known as the Lockhart Phase of Lake Agassiz—water flowed south from the lake into the Mississippi River and into the Gulf of Mexico.

== Geography ==
In the US, the Pembina Escarpment is a Level 4 ecoregion, as defined by the U.S. Environmental Protection Agency. The ecoregion covers 274 square miles (710 km^{2}), and is part of the Level 3 Northern Glaciated Plains ecoregion.

In Canada, the Pembina Escarpment is considered an Ecodistrict within the Southwest Manitoba Uplands Ecoregion, and the Southwest Manitoba Uplands Ecoregion is part of the Prairies Ecozone. A Canadian Ecodistrict is equivalent to a US Level 4 Ecoregion and a Canadian Ecoregion is equivalent to a US Level 3 Ecoregion. A Canadian Ecozone is equivalent to a US Level 1 Ecoregion.

Both the US and Canada consider Turtle Mountain to be a sibling ecodistrict with the Pembina Escarpment, as both countries place both areas within the same larger ecoregions.

Some US sources use the term "Manitoba Escarpment" for the Canadian portion of the Pembina Escarpment, but in Canada, the term Manitoba Escarpment refers to a separate geographical region along the Saskatchewan-Manitoba border. The Pembina Escarpment is separated from the Manitoba Escarpment by the Assiniboine and Souris River valleys, which were covered by Lake Souris at the time of Lake Agassiz when both escarpments were formed.

== Ecology ==
Before the Europeans settled in this region, the slopes and peaks of the escarpment were largely covered by a deciduous forest of burr oak and trembling aspen. The wetter, cooler, shadier slopes had more aspen, and the drier, warmer, sunnier slopes had more oak. The shrubbery along the slopes consisted of beaked hazel, high bush cranberry, saskatoon berry, and pin cherry.

The areas along rivers and creeks with more moisture had Manitoba maple, green ash, red osier dogwood and willows.

Native vegetation has largely been cleared to make way for agriculture, but still exists on steep slopes and near water where farming is difficult.

== See also ==
- List of escarpments
