= Elbow Lake, Saskatchewan =

Hamlet in Saskatchewan, Canada

Coordinates: 52°29′30″N 101°42′52″W

Elbow Lake is a hamlet in the Canadian province of Saskatchewan.

The community is situated on the north-west corner of Elbow Lake in the Porcupine Hills.

== Demographics ==
In the 2021 Census of Population conducted by Statistics Canada, Elbow Lake had a population of 10 living in 5 of its 29 total private dwellings, a change of inf% from its 2016 population of . With a land area of 0.01 km^{2} (0.0039 sq mi), it had a population density of 1,000.0/km^{2} (2,590.0/sq mi) in 2021.

== See also ==
- List of communities in Saskatchewan
