= Saskatchewan Highway 983 =

Provincial highway in Saskatchewan, Canada

Highway 983

Route information
- Maintained by Ministry of Highways and Infrastructure
- Length: 54 km (34 mi)

Major junctions
- West end: Highway 984 south of Somme
- Highway 9
- East end: Highway 982 in McBride Lake Recreation Site

Location
- Country: Canada
- Province: Saskatchewan

Highway system
- Provincial highways in Saskatchewan
← Highway 982	→ Highway 984

Highway 983 is a provincial highway in the east-central region of the Canadian province of Saskatchewan.

The highway runs from Highway 984 near Somme and McNab Creek to Highway 982 near the Pepaw Lake Recreation Site. The highway's route from west to east follows along the Piwei River, Pepaw River, Eldredge Lake, McBride Lake, through the McBride Lake Recreation Site, and on to Highway 982 near Pepaw Lake. Highway 983 connects with Highway 9 near where the Etomami River meets the Piwei River. It is about 54 kilometres (34 mi) long.

== See also ==
- Roads in Saskatchewan
- Transportation in Saskatchewan
