= Rural Municipality of Hudson Bay No. 394 =

Rural municipality in Saskatchewan, Canada

Hudson Bay No. 394
- Rural municipality
- Rural Municipality of Hudson Bay No. 394

- Location of the RM of Hudson Bay No. 394 in Saskatchewan
- Coordinates: 53.137°N 102.206°W
- Country: Canada
- Province: Saskatchewan
- Census division: 14
- SARM division: 4
- Federal riding: Desnethé—Missinippi—Churchill River; Yorkton—Melville
- Provincial riding: Carrot River Valley
- Formed: May 1, 1977

Government
  - Reeve: Neal Hardy
  - Governing body: RM of Hudson Bay No. 394 Council
  - Administrator: Tracy Smith
  - Office location: Hudson Bay

Area (2016)
  - Land: 12,462.61 km^{2} (4,811.84 sq mi)

Population (2016)
  - Total: 1,114
  - Density: 0.1/km^{2} (0.26/sq mi)
- Time zone: CST
  - Summer (DST): CST
- Postal code: S0E 0Y0
- Area codes: 306 and 639

The Rural Municipality of Hudson Bay No. 394 (2016 population: 1,114) is a rural municipality (RM) in the Canadian province of Saskatchewan within Census Division No. 14 and SARM Division No. 4. At 12,462 km^{2} (4,812 sq mi) in area, it is the largest rural municipality in Saskatchewan. It is in the northeast-central portion of the province.

== History ==
The RM of Hudson Bay No. 394 incorporated as a rural municipality on May 1, 1977.

== Geography ==
=== Communities and localities ===
The following urban municipalities are surrounded by the RM.

Towns

- Hudson Bay

The following unincorporated communities are within the RM.

Organized hamlets

- Elbow Lake
- Erwood
- Little Swan River

Localities

- Akosane
- Bertwell
- Etomami
- Hudson Bay Junction
- Reserve
- Veillardville

The RM also surrounds several First Nations communities.

== Demographics ==
Population history (1981–2016)
| Year | Pop. | ±% |
|---|---|---|
| 1981 | 2,224 | — |
| 1986 | 2,100 | −5.6% |
| 1991 | 1,889 | −10.0% |
| 1996 | 1,577 | −16.5% |
| 2001 | 1,492 | −5.4% |
| 2006 | 1,359 | −8.9% |
| 2011 | 1,122 | −17.4% |
| 2016 | 1,114 | −0.7% |
Source: Statistics Canada via Saskatchewan Bureau of Statistics

In the 2021 Census of Population conducted by Statistics Canada, the RM of Hudson Bay No. 394 had a population of 1,145 living in 494 of its 849 total private dwellings, a change of 4.9% from its 2016 population of 1,092. With a land area of 12,399.12 km^{2} (4,787.33 sq mi), it had a population density of 0.1/km^{2} (0.2/sq mi) in 2021.

In the 2016 Census of Population, the RM of Hudson Bay No. 394 recorded a population of 1,114 living in 485 of its 852 total private dwellings, a −0.7% change from its 2011 population of 1,122. With a land area of 12,462.61 km^{2} (4,811.84 sq mi), it had a population density of 0.1/km^{2} (0.2/sq mi) in 2016. It is the least densely populated rural municipality in Saskatchewan.

== Government ==
The RM of Hudson Bay No. 394 is governed by an elected municipal council and an appointed administrator that meets on the second Tuesday of every month. The reeve of the RM is Neal Hardy while its administrator is Tracy Smith. The RM's office is located in Hudson Bay.

== Transportation ==
Rail

- Hudson Bay Branch CNR — serves Hudson Bay Junction, Wachee, Ceba, Chemong)
- Swan River — Prince Albert Branch CNR — serves Baden, Powell, Barrows Junction, Westgate, Roscoe, Erwood, Hudson Bay Junction, Greenbush, Prairie River, Bannock, Mistatim, Peesane, Crooked River, Eldersley, Tisdale, Valparaiso
- Reserve station in Reserve is served by the Winnipeg-Churchill train.
Services
- | Preceding station | Via Rail | Following station |
  |---|---|---|
  | Hudson Bay toward Churchill | Winnipeg–Churchill | Endeavour toward Winnipeg |
  Former services
  | Preceding station | Canadian National Railway | Following station |
  | Bertwell toward Hudson Bay Junction | Regina – Hudson Bay Junction | Tallpines toward Regina |

Roads

- Highway 3—serves Hudson Bay and Erwood
- Highway 9—serves Hudson Bay
- Highway 55—Comes near Shoal Lake First Nation and Red Earth First Nation
- Highway 980—serves Woody River Recreation Site
- Highway 981—serves Erwood
- Highway 982 (Little Swan Road)—connects Hudson Bay and Swan Plain, Saskatchewan
- Highway 983 (McBride Lake Road)—serves Reserve

== See also ==
- List of rural municipalities in Saskatchewan
