= Swan River (Manitoba–Saskatchewan) =

River in Manitoba, Canada

Coordinates: 52°29′40″N 100°45′15″W

Location
- Country: Canada
- Provinces: Manitoba; Saskatchewan

Physical characteristics
- Source
  - location: Porcupine Hills
- Mouth
  - location: Swan Lake
- Length: 110 mi (180 km)
- Basin size: 1,635 mi^{2} (4,230 km^{2})
- Discharge
  - average: 8,511 cu ft/s (241.0 m^{3}/s)

Swan River is located in the Canadian provinces of Manitoba and Saskatchewan. The river, and several other features in the area, are named after the trumpeter swans found in the region.

== Description ==
The river is located in the Swan Lake drainage basin. It arises in the northwest corner of the basin in the Porcupine Hills and flows generally south, contained in a large valley two miles (3 km) wide and 400 feet (120 m) deep, until it nears Pelly, Saskatchewan. Here it turns northeast, collecting tributary streams off the north escarpment of the Duck Mountains, and terminates at Swan Lake. Slopes on the south escarpment of the Porcupine Hills average 100 feet per mile (19 m/km). The elevation of the Swan River plain at Norquay, Saskatchewan is 1,700 feet (520 m) above sea level, and at Swan Lake it is 850 feet (260 m) above sea level, with an average slope of 13 feet per mile (2.5 m/km).

The Swan River has a drainage area of 1,635 square miles (4,230 km^{2}), a maximum annual discharge of 478,000 acre-feet (590×10^{6} m^{3}) (1922), and a maximum daily discharge of 8,511 cubic feet per second (241.0 m^{3}/s) (1995). Major tributaries include Maloneck Creek and Spruce Creek, (which originate in the Swan River plain), and Bear Head Creek, Roaring River, the West and East Favel Rivers, and the Sinclair River, (which originate in the Duck Mountains).

Communities located on the river include Swan River and Lenswood. Communities located on its tributaries include Norquay (on Spruce Creek), and Minitonas (on the East Favel River). The average annual discharge of the river at the Town of Swan River is approximately 200,000 acre-feet (250×10^{6} m^{3}) of water.

Surface water quality is generally good to fair. In recent years, total nitrogen and total phosphorus concentration data have shown a decreasing trend.

== See also ==
- Assiniboine River fur trade#Upper Assiniboine and Swan River fur trade
- List of rivers of Manitoba
- List of rivers of Saskatchewan
