= Manitoba Escarpment =

Range of hills in Saskatchewan and Manitoba, Canada

A map showing the hills and mountains that comprise the Manitoba Escarpment

The Manitoba Escarpment, or the Western Manitoba Uplands, are a range of hills along the Saskatchewan–Manitoba border. The eastern slopes of the range are considered to be a scarp. They were created by glacial scouring and formed the western shore of prehistoric Lake Agassiz.

== History ==
The region was inhabited by several different aboriginal tribes before Europeans arrived including: Swampy Cree, Plains Cree, Assiniboine, and Saulteaux. The geography of the hills helped to demarcate the boundaries of the land controlled by different tribes, and the river valleys provided trade routes.

The first European to explore the region was Henry Kelsey, who travelled with a group of Cree traders from York Fort to the Red Deer River to encourage the aboriginal people there to trade with the Hudson's Bay Company.

Throughout the 18th and 19th centuries, the fur trade brought many Europeans to the region who established trading posts and communities.

In the 1890s, the Canadian Northern Railway built a line on the east side of the escarpment which was eventually terminated in the Red Deer River Valley at Erwood in 1900. The building of this railroad led to the establishment of the forestry industry in this region, which overtook trapping as the main economic sector of the region.

Throughout the 20th century, people began immigrating to the region to farm on the east and west sides of the range, and also in the river valleys. In Western Canada, it was common for settlers to arrange themselves by ethnicity to form Block Settlements, and in this area, most settlers were Ukrainian, Russian, or Polish.

== Geography ==
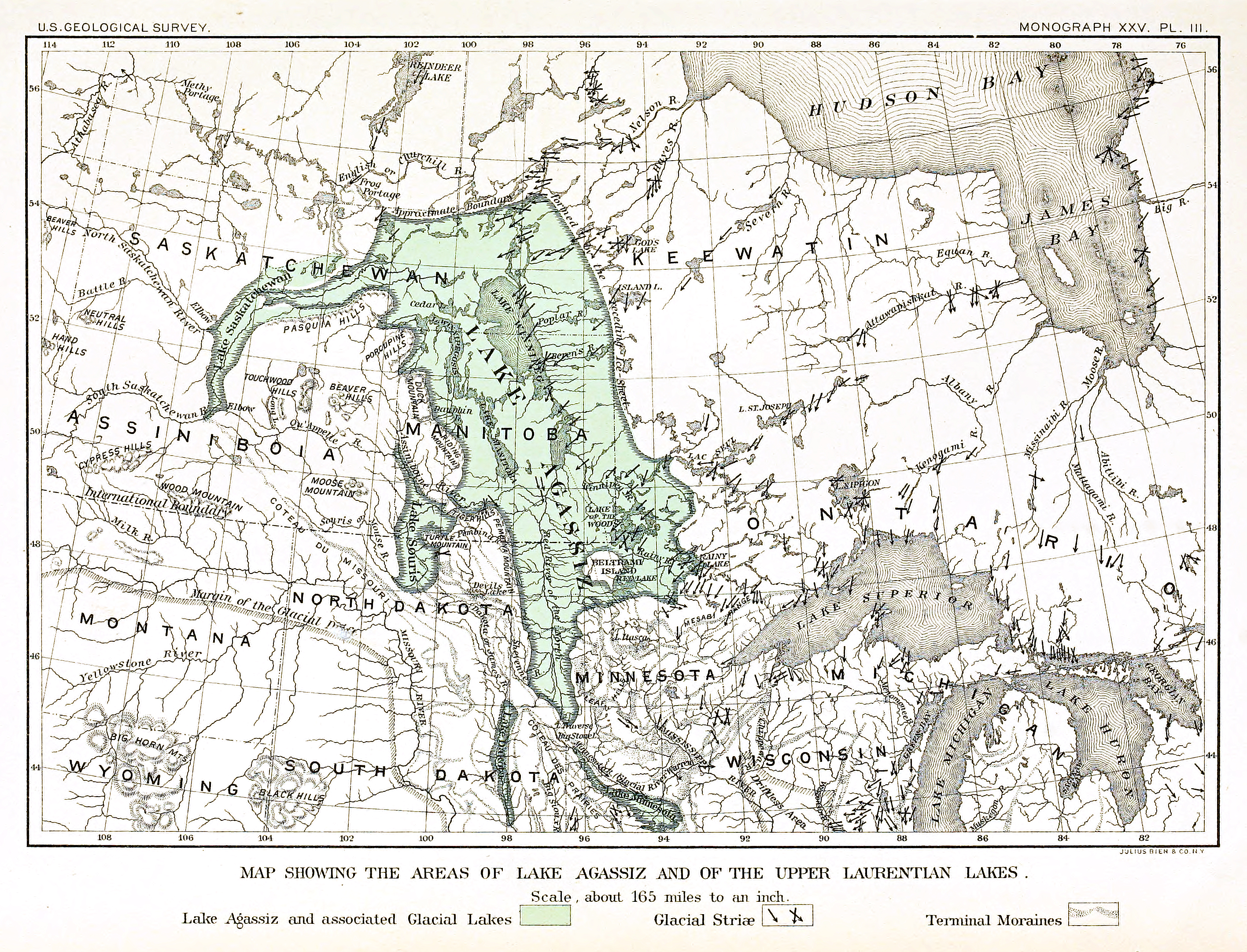
An early map of Lake Agassiz by geologist Warren Upham, which shows the hills and mountains comprising the Manitoba Escarpment. The map also shows Lake Saskatchewan and Lake Souris which created the northern and southern boundaries of the range.

To the east of the range lie the Manitoba Lowlands, which consist of many interconnected lakes, including Lake Winnipegosis, Dauphin Lake, and Lake Manitoba. The lakes in this lowland region (with the largest being Lake Winnipeg) are the last remnants of Lake Agassiz.

To the north lies the Saskatchewan River, and its associated lowlands, which were once covered by prehistoric Lake Saskatchewan which may have been a bay off of Lake Agassiz.

To the west lies Aspen Parkland which was a sparse deciduous forest until the 20th century, but today has been cleared to make way for farmland.

To the south lies the Assiniboine and Souris River valleys, which were once covered by Lake Souris, which may have been a bay off of Lake Agassiz. South of this valley is the Pembina Escarpment, which also formed part of the shores of Lake Agassiz.

The range is intersected by three rivers, whose valleys divide the range into four distinct sets of hills.

- The Red Deer River separates the Pasquia Hills and the Porcupine Hills
- The Swan River separates the Porcupine Hills and the Duck Mountains
- The Valley River separates the Duck Mountains and the Riding Mountains

== Geology ==
The final form of the escarpment was not created until the end of the last ice age, between 9,000 and 10,000 years ago. During the ice age, much of North America was covered by the Laurentide Ice Sheet. As the ice sheet began to melt and recede, the meltwaters became trapped between the higher-elevated land to the west and the remaining portion of the ice sheet to the east, which steepened the slopes of the escarpment to give it the form it has today.

The Pasquia and Porcupine Hills, and the Duck and Riding Mountains, did already exist before the ice age, but it was after the ice age that the eastern slopes were steepened into an escarpment.

== Ecology ==
The forests of the hills are mixed, and consist of mainly aspen, poplar, spruce, and fir. Clusters of white birch are also prevalent. Drier parts of the hills contain jack pines, while wetter parts contain tamarack. A dense layer of shrubs and herbs exists below the trees, and the forest floor is covered by mosses, ferns, and grass.

The isolated nature of these hills means that many rare plant species can be found here. For example, the Hudson Bay, SK area has at least 6 species of rare violets and 21 species of rare orchids.

== See also ==
- Asessippi Ski Area — built on the escarpment
- List of escarpments
