= Porcupine Provincial Forest =

Provincial forest in Saskatchewan and Manitoba, Canada

Coordinates: 52°24′57″N 101°56′26″W

Location of the Porcupine Hills

The Porcupine Provincial Forest is a protected forest which covers the Porcupine Hills in the Canadian provinces of Saskatchewan and Manitoba.

In 1906, the Canadian government established the Porcupine Forest Reserve in the hills. In 1930, once natural resources were transferred from the federal government to the prairie provinces, the Saskatchewan government created the Department of Natural Resources and continued management of the forest.

In 2018, Saskatchewan created the 29,800-hectare (74,000-acre) recreational Porcupine Hills Provincial Park in the forest.

== History ==
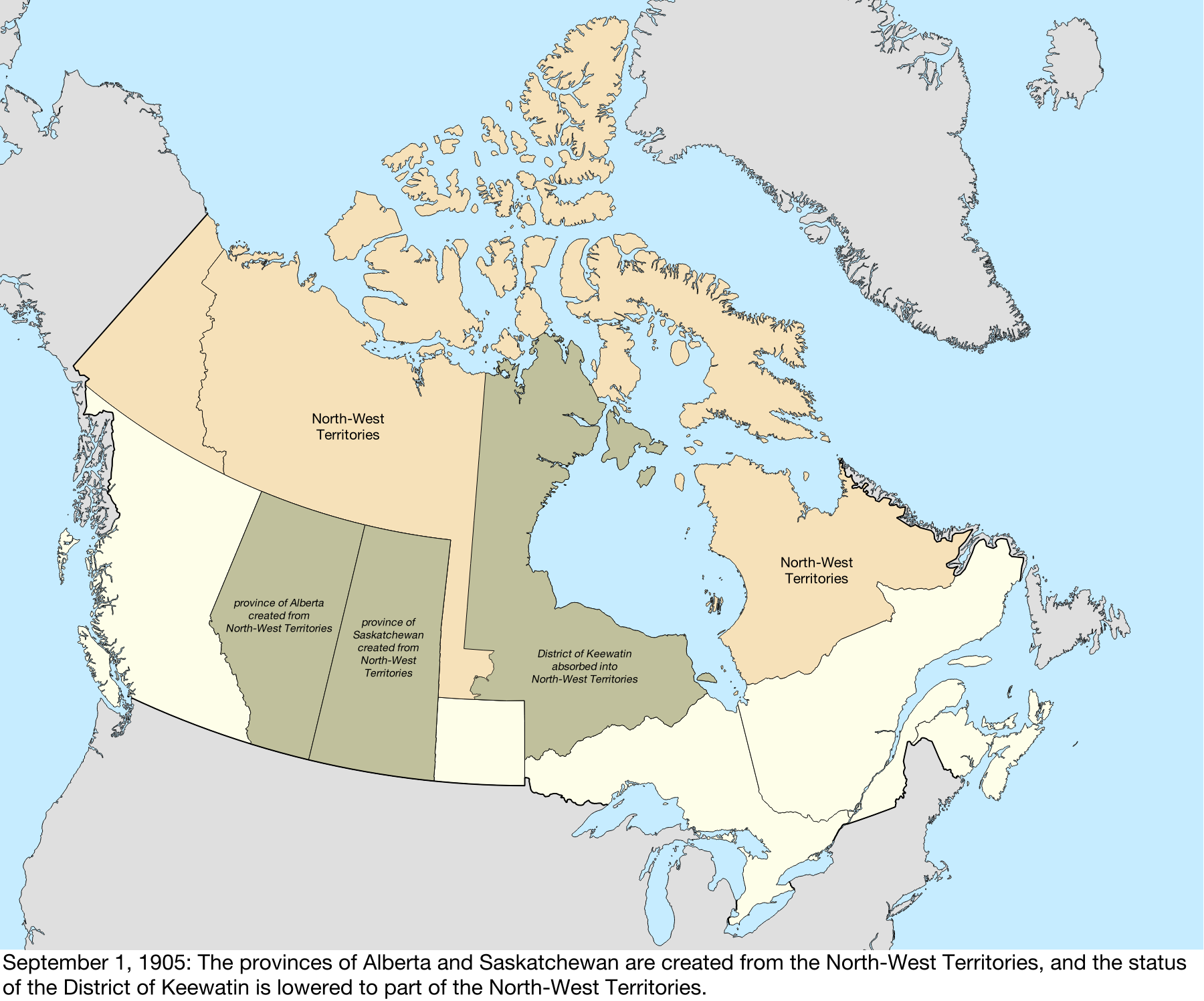
Canada's borders in 1905

By the end of the 19th century, Eastern Canada had essentially run out of marketable timber due to unsustainable logging techniques, land clearing for settlement and agriculture, and an increase in forest fires caused by settlement. In 1899, the Minister of the Interior Clifford Sifton appointed Elihu Stewart as the chief inspector of timber and forestry for the Dominion of Canada. Stewart's job was to protect undisturbed federal forests from unsustainable logging and settlement practices, and to revitalize lands that had already been deforested. Before 1905, the Porcupine Hills were located entirely within the North-West Territories in the District of Saskatchewan, which meant that the Porcupine Forest was under full federal control. By 1901, a fire ranging service was established in Western Canada, and plans were made to determine which areas could be used for agriculture, and which areas would be left as forest.

In 1905, the province of Saskatchewan was created, and its eastern border cut through the Porcupine Forest. Approximately 80% of the forest lay within the new province, and the other 20% remained within the North-West Territories. Unlike the five eastern provinces and British Columbia, the three Prairie Provinces were not given control over their own natural resources. So even though Saskatchewan owned the land beneath the forest, they could not build infrastructure or settlements, or cut any wood, without permission of the federal government.

In 1906, the Canadian government passed the first Dominion Forest Reserves Act, which officially established the Porcupine Forest Reserve as a national forest. They hired forest rangers and built a headquarters at Ushta, Saskatchewan. Many of the first rangers were either forestry engineers from the University of New Brunswick, First World War veterans, or both. By 1914, the new forest reserve was overseen by 11 rangers, and one ranger-in-charge, and these rangers also oversaw the nearby Pasquia Forest Reserve. In addition to the headquarters, four ranger cabins, five stables, and four fire towers were built for the rangers.

In 1930, the Saskatchewan Natural Resources Act was passed, which transferred control of Saskatchewan forests (and other natural resources) from the federal government to the Saskatchewan government. Once Saskatchewan officially received ownership of their natural resources, they created the Department of Natural Resources (DNR) to manage them. The rangers that had previously worked for the Dominion Forest Service now worked for the Saskatchewan DNR.

== Description ==
The Porcupine Forest is near the southern limit of the boreal forest of Saskatchewan and Manitoba and covers the Porcupine Hills. The Porcupine Hills are part of a series of hills in western Manitoba and eastern Saskatchewan known as the Manitoba Escarpment.

Manitoba's portion of the Porcupine Provincial Forest has an area of 2,090 square kilometres (810 sq mi) and is located mostly in an unorganized part of Census Division No. 20, with small parts of it extending southward into the Rural Municipality of Swan River, and eastward into the Rural Municipality of Mountain, both of which are in the same census division.

In Saskatchewan, the forest covers parts of several rural municipalities, including Hudson Bay No. 394, Porcupine No. 395, Kelvington No. 366, Preeceville No. 334, Hazel Dell No. 335, Clayton No. 333, and Livingston No. 331.

== See also ==
- List of Saskatchewan provincial forests
- List of Manitoba provincial forests
