= Porcupine Hills =

Geological formation in Manitoba and Saskatchewan, Canada

Coordinates: 52°33′40″N 101°22′20″W

Manitoba Escarpment

The Porcupine Hills refer to various groups of hills and uplands in the Canadian provinces of Saskatchewan and Manitoba. They are part of the Manitoba Escarpment, which was the shoreline of the ancient glacial Lake Agassiz. The hills are located north-west of Swan River, Manitoba, and are the headwaters of the Swan River. The highest elevation in the Porcupine Hills is Hart Mountain, at an elevation of 823 metres (2,700 ft), which makes it Manitoba's second-highest point. The Porcupine Provincial Forest surrounds the area. On the Saskatchewan side, is the Porcupine Hills Provincial Park.

== See also ==
- List of mountains of Saskatchewan
