= List of protected areas of Saskatchewan =

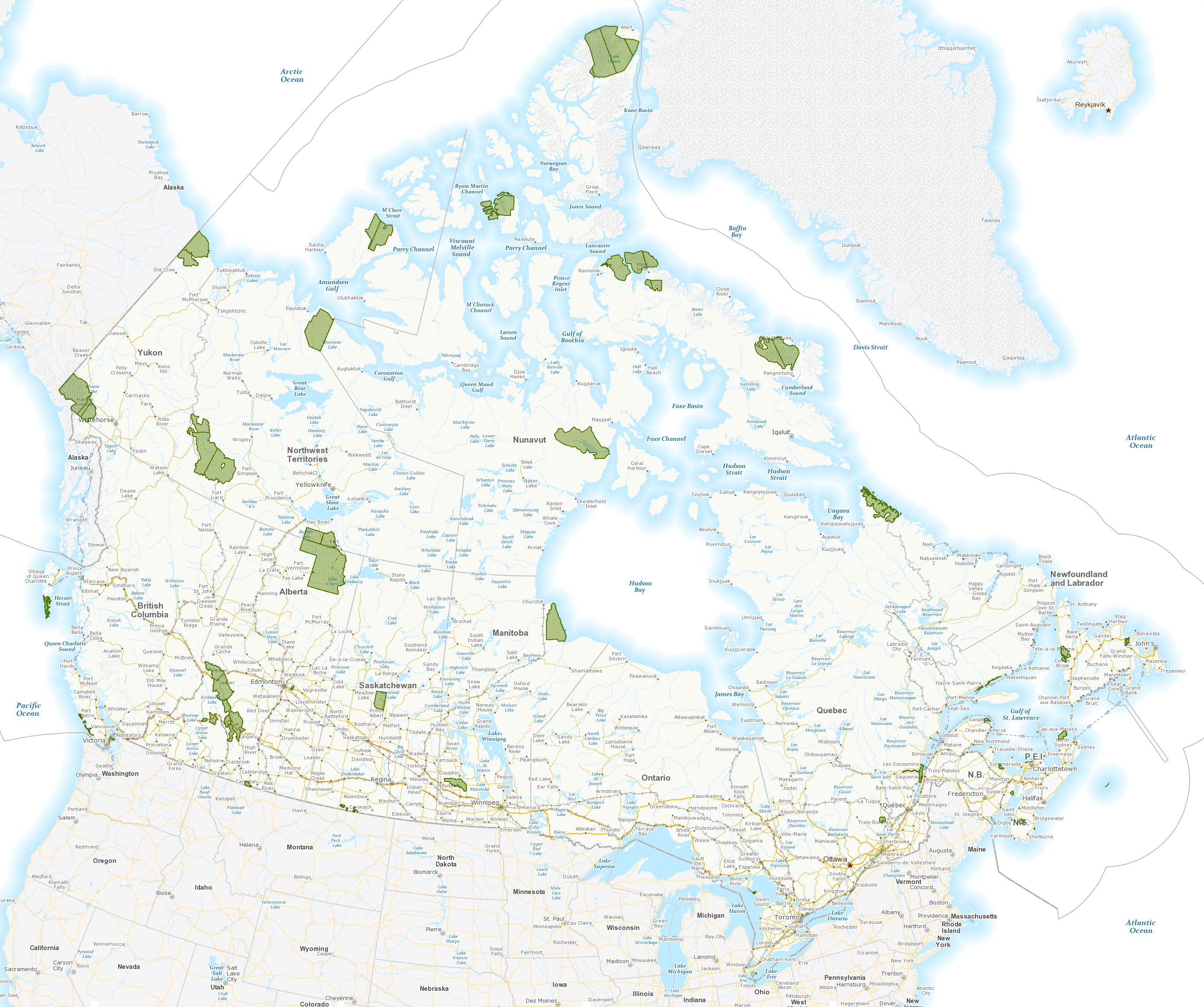
Canada's National Parks and National Reserves by provinces and territories

This is a list of protected areas of Saskatchewan in Canada.

== National parks ==
There are two Canadian national parks in Saskatchewan.

Name	Location	Established	Coordinates
Grasslands National Park	RM of Old Post No. 43; RM of Waverley No. 44; RM of Mankota No. 45; RM of Val Marie No. 17	1981	West Block: 49.1693°N 107.6269°W; East Block: 49°04'04.3"N 106°31'57.2"W
Prince Albert National Park	Northern Administration District	1927	53.9469°N 106.3888°W

== Provincial parks ==
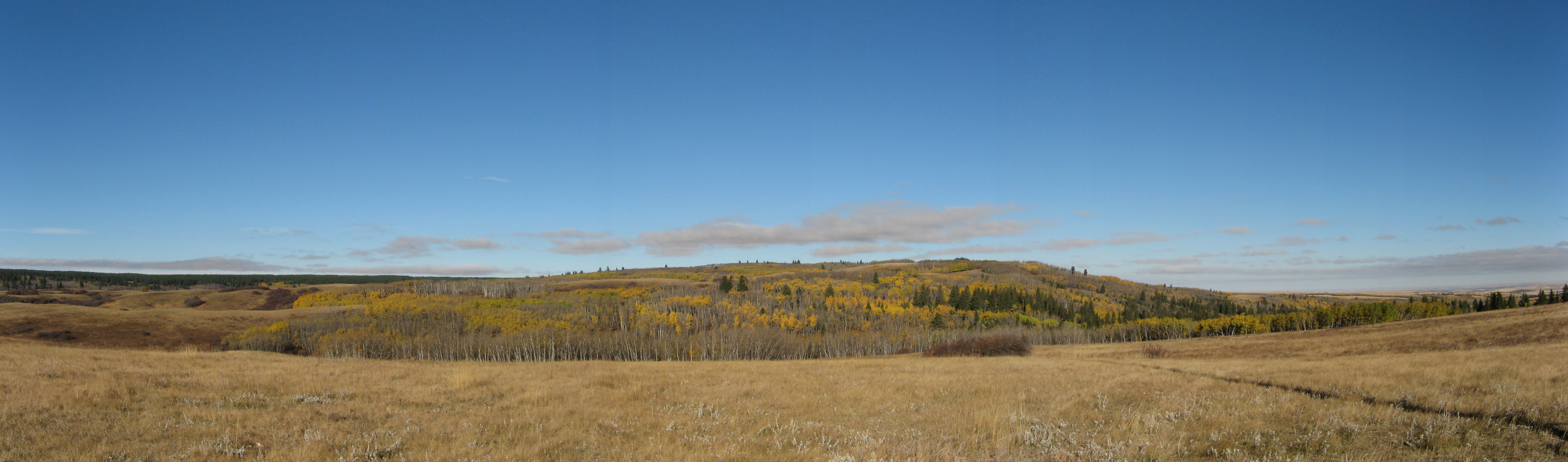
Cypress Hills Interprovincial Park

Sask Parks operates 39 provincial parks in Saskatchewan. One of the parks, Cypress Hills Interprovincial Park, straddles the border with the neighbouring province of Alberta.

== Regional parks ==
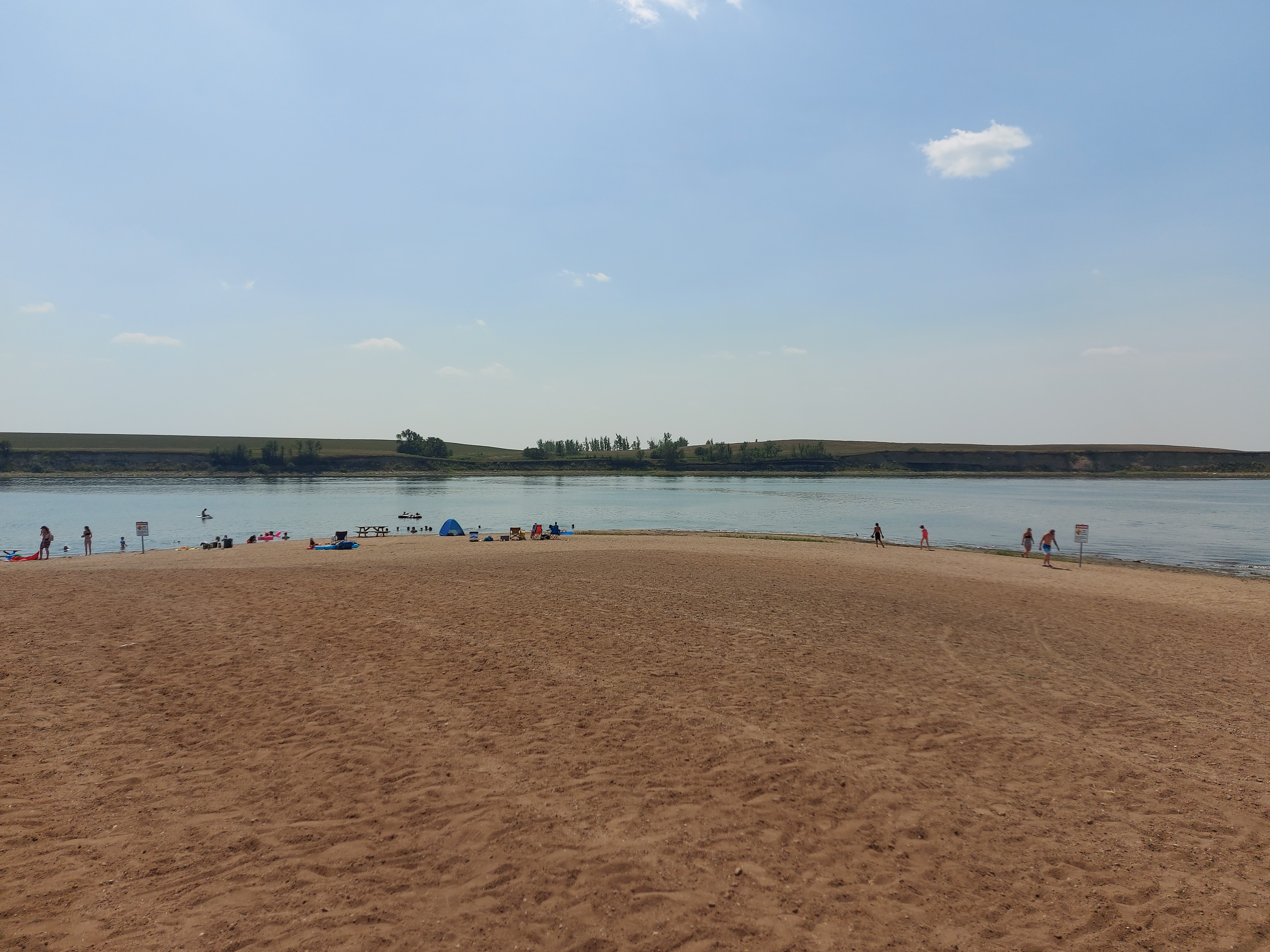
Main Beach at Woodlawn-Boundary Dam

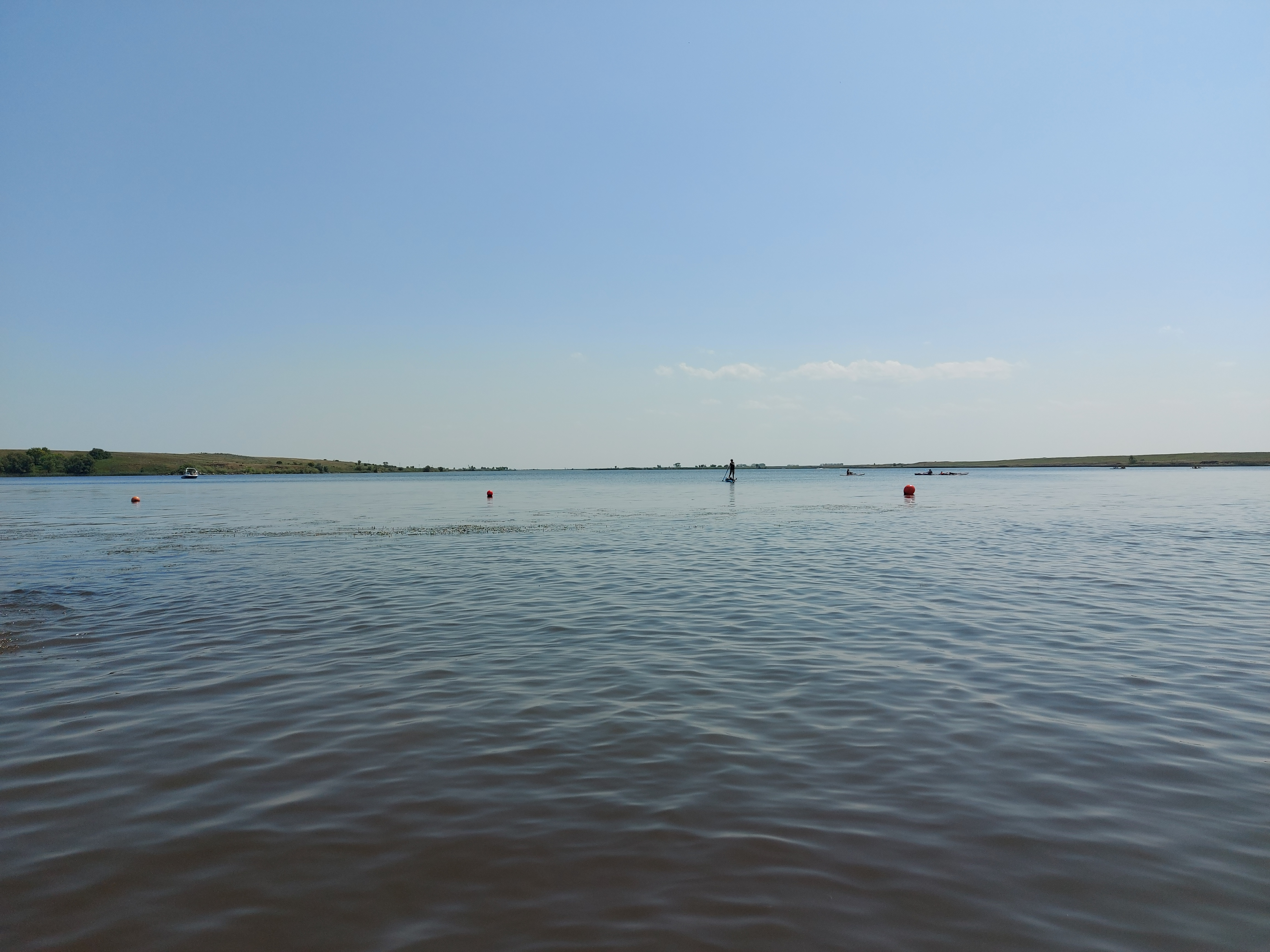
Nickle Lake Regional Park

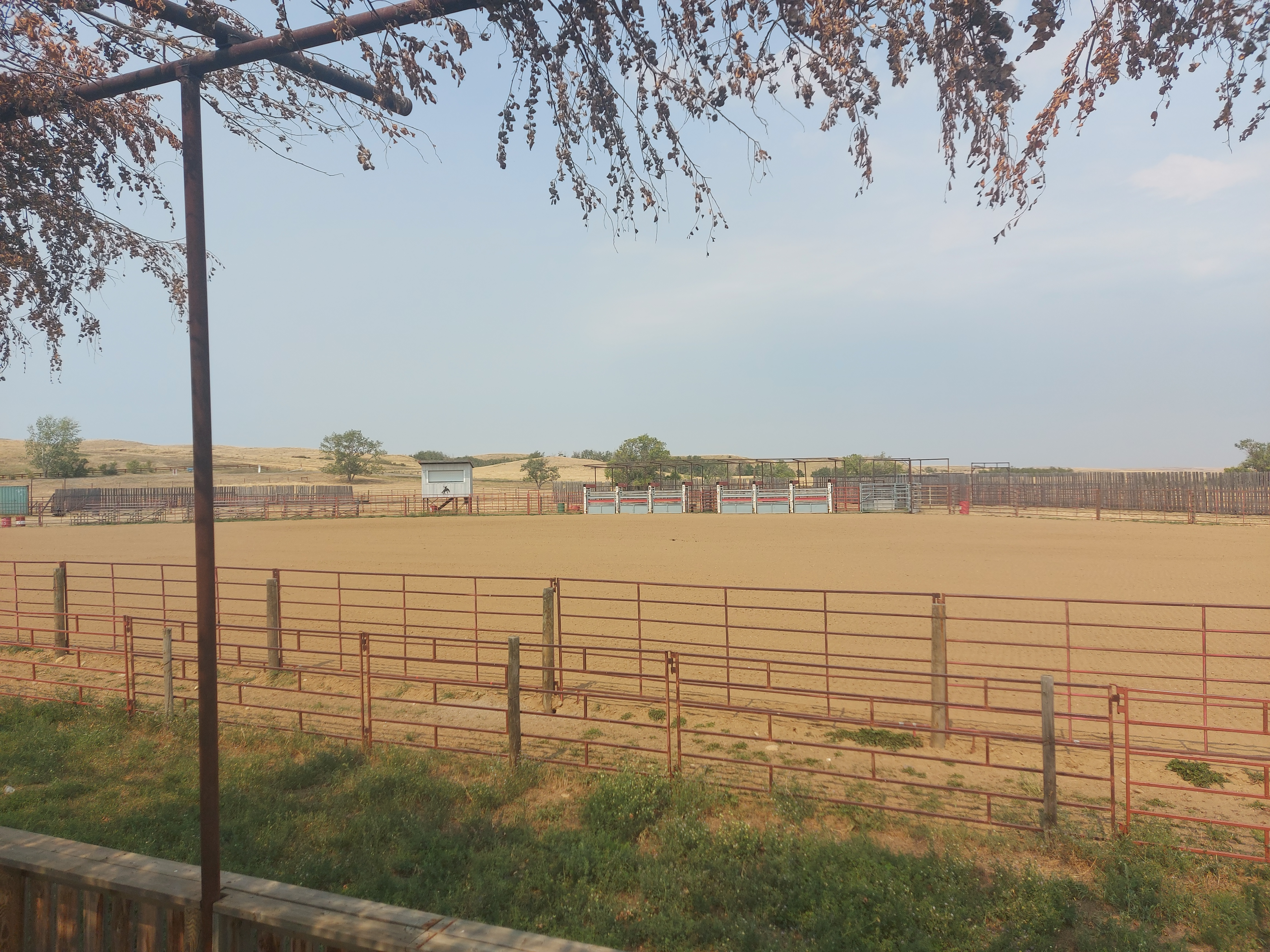
Rodeo grounds at Wood Mountain Regional Park

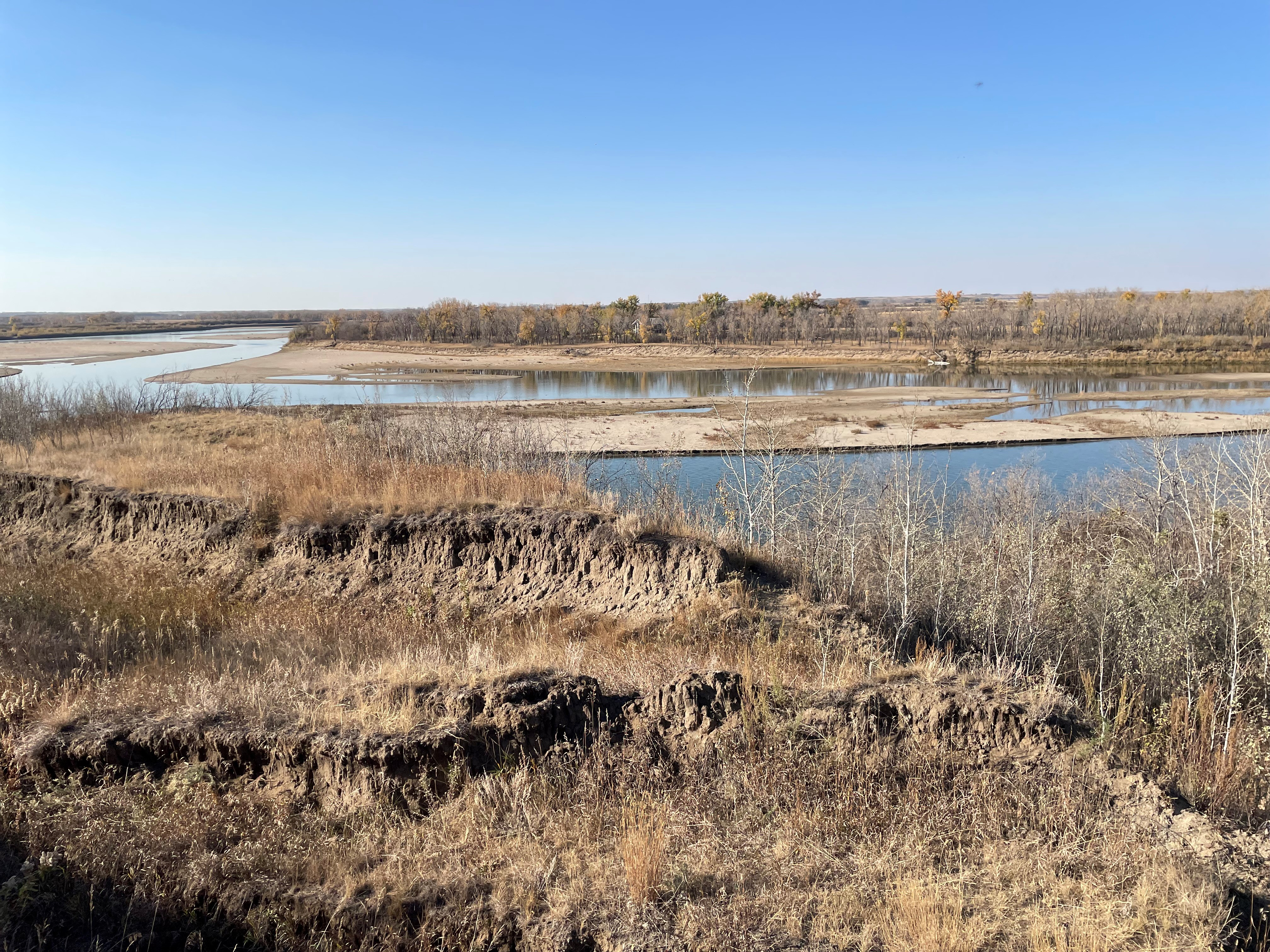
Beaver Creek Conservation Area

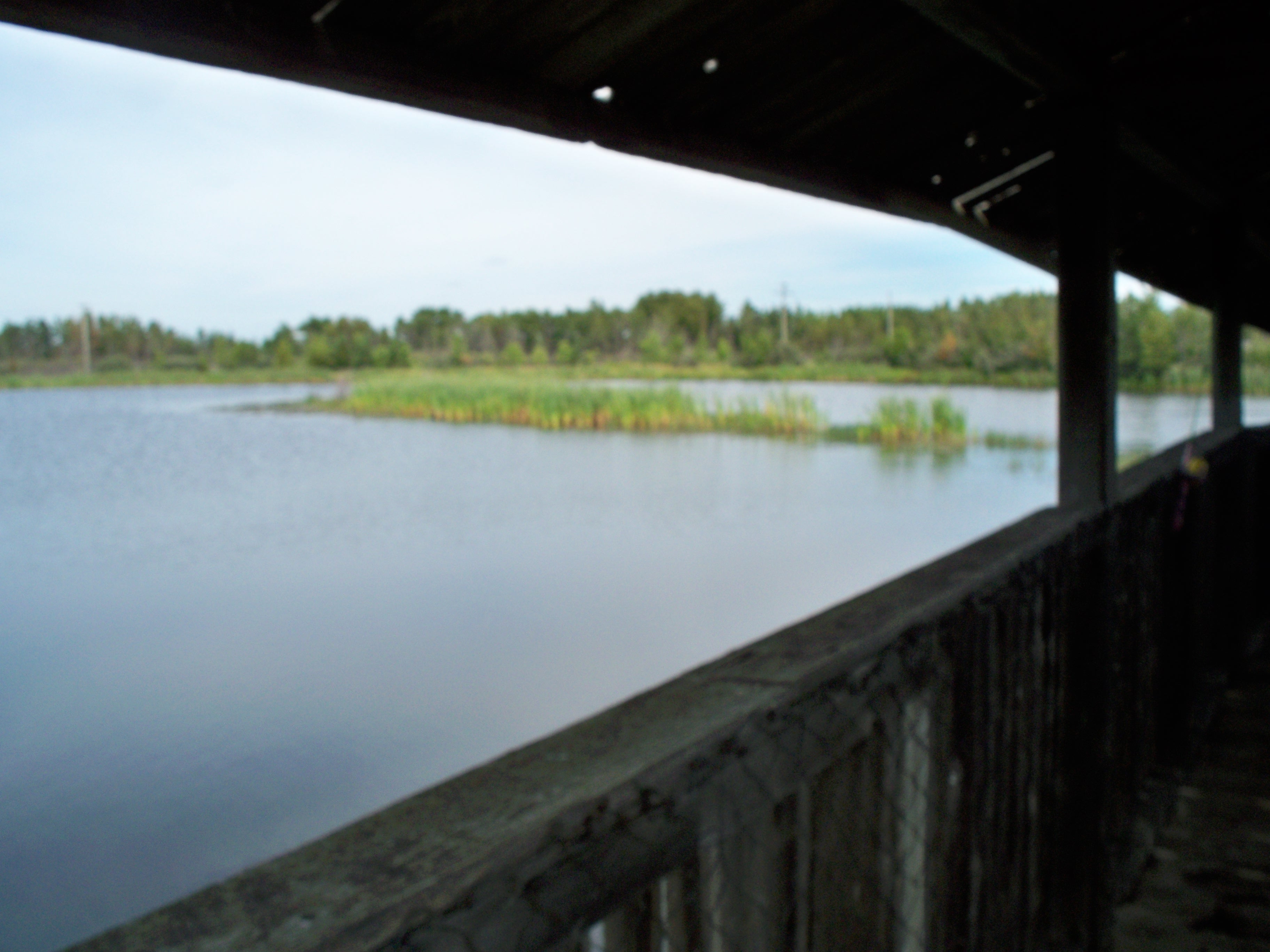
Biggar Trout Pond at Biggar & District Regional Park

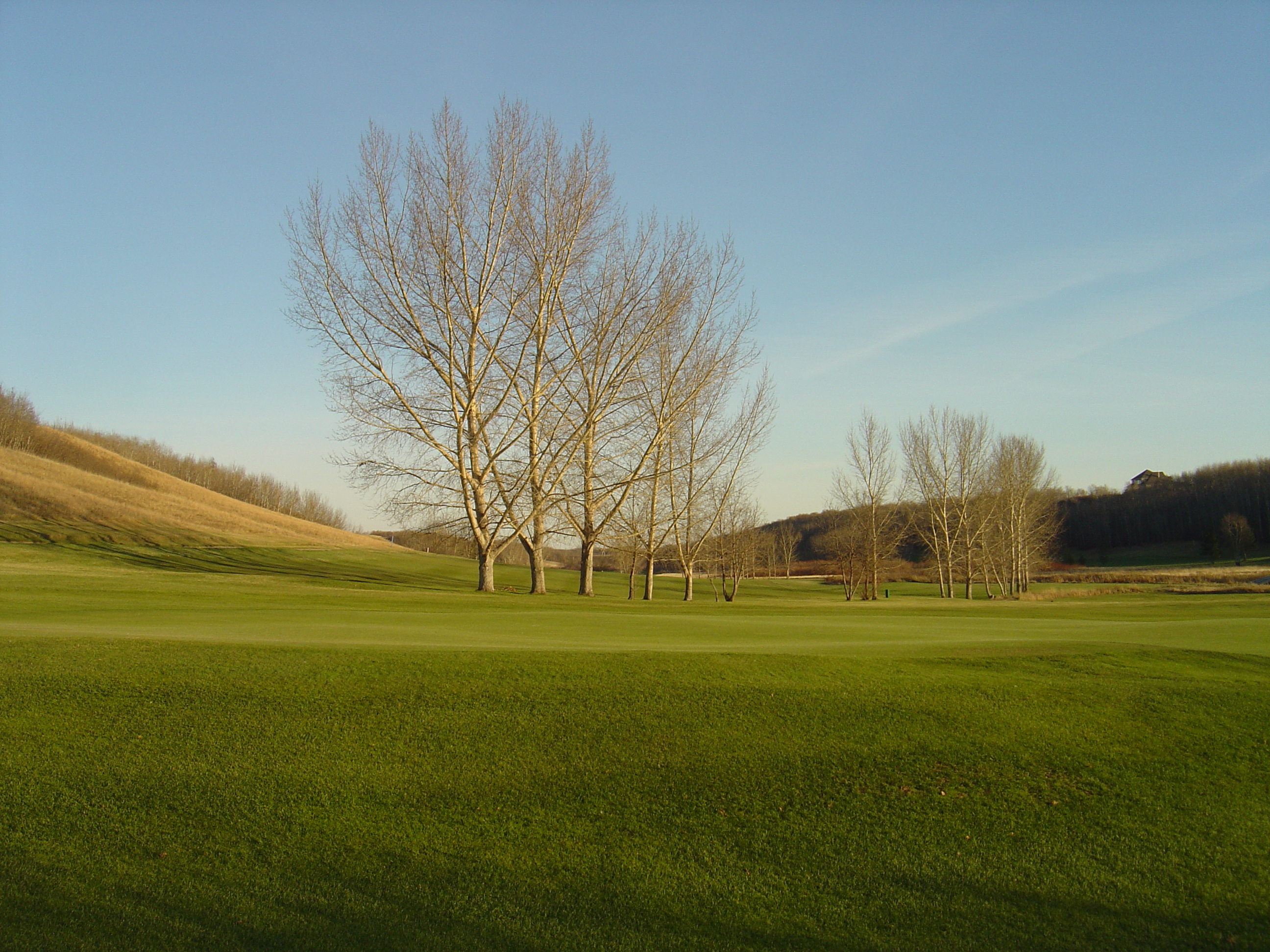
Esterhazy Golf and Country Club at Esterhazy Regional Park

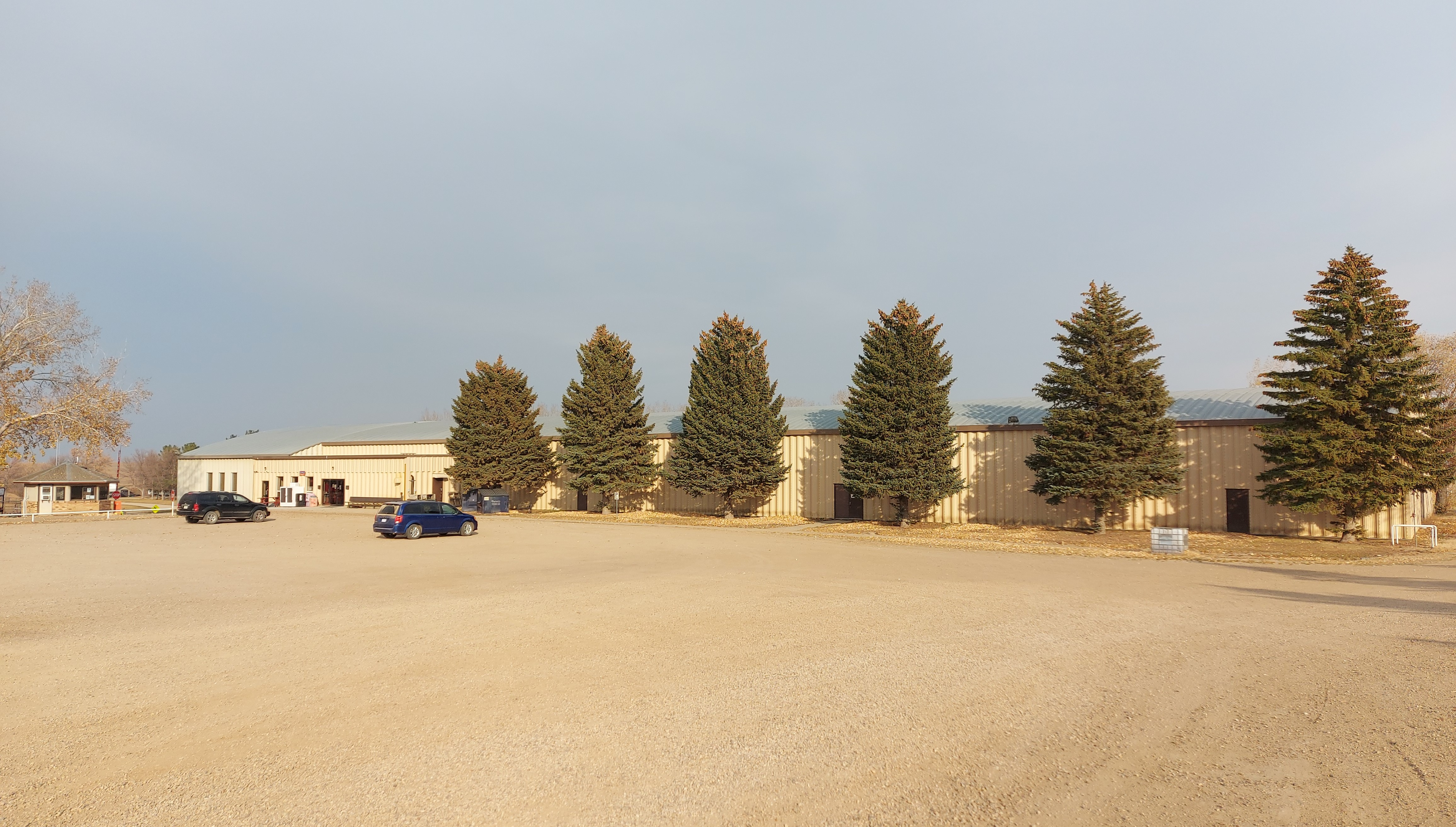
Souris Valley Communiplex at Oungre Park

Most Regional Parks are established as per the Regional Parks Act. Virtually all of the regional parks in Saskatchewan are affiliated with the Saskatchewan Regional Parks Association (SRPA). The SPRA supports the parks by assisting with research, education, marketing, etc.

A yearly park pass purchased at any SRPA park also grants access to all other SRPA parks.

The Meewasin Valley Authority Act, the Wakamow Valley Authority Act, and the Provincial Capital Commission Act also give authority to create regional parks.

The following is a list of all the regional parks:

Name	Affiliation	Established	Coordinates
Antelope Lake Regional Park	Saskatchewan Regional Parks Association	1972	50.2778°N 108.4146°W
Assiniboia Regional Park	Saskatchewan Regional Parks Association	1977	49.6263°N 105.9905°W
Atton's Lake Regional Park	Saskatchewan Regional Parks Association	1965	52.8324°N 108.8585°W
Beaver Creek Conservation Area	Meewasin Valley Authority	1979	51.9796°N 106.7159°W
Bengough & District Regional Park	Saskatchewan Regional Parks Association	1975	49.3918°N 105.1268°W
Big Manitou Regional Park	Saskatchewan Regional Parks Association	2019	52.7967°N 109.7886°W
Big River Regional Park	Saskatchewan Regional Parks Association	1978	53.8379°N 107.0239°W
Biggar & District Regional Park	Saskatchewan Regional Parks Association		52.0792°N 107.9756°W
Brightsand Lake Regional Park	Saskatchewan Regional Parks Association	1965	53.6436°N 108.8458°W
Cabri Regional Park	Saskatchewan Regional Parks Association	1976	50.6694°N 108.2668°W
Canwood Regional Park	Saskatchewan Regional Parks Association	1961	53.3647°N 106.5457°W
Carlton Trail Regional Park	Saskatchewan Regional Parks Association	1972	50.6752°N 101.6949°W
Ceylon Regional Park	Saskatchewan Regional Parks Association	1965	49.4834°N 104.3172°W
Clearwater Lake Regional Park	Saskatchewan Regional Parks Association		50.8683°N 107.9285°W
Craik & District Regional Park	Saskatchewan Regional Parks Association	1971	51.0607°N 105.7986°W
Cranberry Flats Conservation Area	Meewasin Valley Authority		52.0311°N 106.7005°W
Dunnet Regional Park	Saskatchewan Regional Parks Association	1967	49.9931°N 105.0115°W
Eagle Creek Regional Park	Saskatchewan Regional Parks Association	1963	52.2167°N 107.4006°W
Emerald Lake Regional Park	Saskatchewan Regional Parks Association	1968	53.1806°N 106.9631°W
Esterhazy Regional Park	Saskatchewan Regional Parks Association	1984	50.6583°N 102.0588°W
Eston Riverside Regional Park	Saskatchewan Regional Parks Association	1967	50.9639°N 108.7664°W
Glenburn Regional Park	Saskatchewan Regional Parks Association	1967	52.4956°N 107.7017°W
Government House	Provincial Capital Commission	1968	50.4541°N 104.6477°W
Hazlet Regional Park	None	1960	50.4071°N 108.6471°W
Hudson Bay Regional Park	Saskatchewan Regional Parks Association		52.8278°N 102.3714°W
Ituna & District Regional Park	Saskatchewan Regional Parks Association	1966	51.1575°N 103.4899°W
Jean Louis Legare Regional Park	Saskatchewan Regional Parks Association	1961	49.3741°N 105.6573°W
Kemoca Regional Park	Saskatchewan Regional Parks Association	1970	50.2149°N 103.4482°W
Kindersley Regional Park	Saskatchewan Regional Parks Association	1968	51.4498°N 109.1451°W
Kipabiskau Regional Park	Saskatchewan Regional Parks Association	1965	52.5737°N 104.1898°W
Lac Pelletier Regional Park	Saskatchewan Regional Parks Association	1964	49.9839°N 107.9256°W
Lake Charron Regional Park	Saskatchewan Regional Parks Association	1972	52.4099°N 104.3112°W
Last Mountain Regional Park	Saskatchewan Regional Parks Association	1963	51.3514°N 105.2172°W
Leroy Leisureland Regional Park	Saskatchewan Regional Parks Association	1972	51.9981°N 104.8337°W
Leslie Beach Regional Park	Saskatchewan Regional Parks Association	1967	51.8082°N 103.5611°W
Little Loon Regional Park	Saskatchewan Regional Parks Association		53.3545°N 108.2592°W
Lucien Lake Regional Park	Saskatchewan Regional Parks Association	1967	52.4788°N 105.3162°W
Macklin Lake Regional Park	Saskatchewan Regional Parks Association	1962	52.3253°N 109.9362°W
Mainprize Regional Park	Saskatchewan Regional Parks Association	1961	49.3691°N 103.5821°W
Manitou & District Regional Park	Saskatchewan Regional Parks Association	1962	51.7157°N 105.4514°W
Martins Lake Regional Park	Saskatchewan Regional Parks Association	1962	52.9955°N 106.9963°W
McLaren Lake Regional Park	Saskatchewan Regional Parks Association	1961	50.2956°N 109.8841°W
McNab Regional Park	Saskatchewan Regional Parks Association	1980	52.1227°N 104.5284°W
Meeting Lake Regional Park	Saskatchewan Regional Parks Association	1965	53.1999°N 107.7103°W
Meewasin Northeast Swale	Meewasin Valley Authority		52.1681°N 106.6028°W
Meewasin Trail	Meewasin Valley Authority		
Melville Regional Park	Saskatchewan Regional Parks Association		50.9369°N 102.7961°W
Memorial Lake Regional Park	Saskatchewan Regional Parks Association	1962	53.2973°N 107.0617°W
Meota Regional Park	Saskatchewan Regional Parks Association		53.0379°N 108.4507°W
Moose Creek Regional Park	Saskatchewan Regional Parks Association		49.2939°N 102.2022°W
Moosomin Lake Regional Park	Saskatchewan Regional Parks Association	1955	50.0784°N 101.7106°W
Morin Lake Regional Park	Saskatchewan Regional Parks Association	1984	53.4978°N 107.0539°W
Nickle Lake Regional Park	Saskatchewan Regional Parks Association	1964	49.5953°N 103.7781°W
Nipawin & District Regional Park	Saskatchewan Regional Parks Association	1965	53.3847°N 104.0083°W
Notukeu Regional Park	Saskatchewan Regional Parks Association	1964	49.7501°N 107.4854°W
Ogema Regional Park	Saskatchewan Regional Parks Association	1967	49.5721°N 104.9168°W
Oungre Memorial Regional Park	Saskatchewan Regional Parks Association	1963	49.1644°N 103.8088°W
Outlook & District Regional Park	Saskatchewan Regional Parks Association	1961	51.4834°N 107.0673°W
Palliser Regional Park	Saskatchewan Regional Parks Association	1962	50.8776°N 106.9277°W
Pasquia Regional Park	Saskatchewan Regional Parks Association	1967	53.1889°N 103.5796°W
Pine Cree Regional Park	Saskatchewan Regional Parks Association	1970	49.6122°N 108.7546°W
Prairie Lake Regional Park	Saskatchewan Regional Parks Association	1984	50.7125°N 107.3839°W
Radville-Laurier Regional Park	Saskatchewan Regional Parks Association	1965	49.4576°N 104.3027°W
Redberry Lake Regional Park	Saskatchewan Regional Parks Association	1969	52.7120°N 107.217°W
Rockin Beach Regional Park	None		49.1971°N 105.8641°W
Saltcoats & District Regional Park	Saskatchewan Regional Parks Association	1963	51.0278°N 102.1561°W
Sandy Beach Regional Park	Saskatchewan Regional Parks Association	1966	53.4501°N 109.9925°W
Saskatchewan Legislative Building	Provincial Capital Commission	1978	50.4324°N 104.6151°W
Saskatoon Natural Grasslands	Meewasin Valley Authority		
Shamrock Regional Park	Saskatchewan Regional Parks Association	1961	50.0591°N 106.4606°W
Silver Lake Regional Park	Saskatchewan Regional Parks Association	1964	53.2284°N 109.2679°W
St. Brieux Regional Park	Saskatchewan Regional Parks Association	1972	52.6321°N 104.9025°W
Struthers Lake Regional Park	Saskatchewan Regional Parks Association	1965	52.8449°N 105.2324°W
Sturgeon Lake Regional Park	Saskatchewan Regional Parks Association	1965	53.4221°N 106.1541°W
Sturgis & District — Lady Lake Regional Park	Saskatchewan Regional Parks Association		52.0263°N 102.653°W
Suffern Lake Regional Park	Saskatchewan Regional Parks Association	1967	52.6405°N 109.898°W
Table Mountain Regional Park	None		52.8148°N 108.6048°W
Thomson Lake Regional Park	Saskatchewan Regional Parks Association	1961	49.7687°N 106.5775°W
Valley — Rosthern Regional Park	Saskatchewan Regional Parks Association	1974	52.6834°N 106.3006°W
Wakaw Lake Regional Park	Saskatchewan Regional Parks Association	1965	52.6641°N 105.6096°W
Waldheim Valley Regional Park	None		52.6167°N 106.6339°W
Wapiti Valley Regional Park	Saskatchewan Regional Parks Association	1984	53.2334°N 104.4588°W
Wascana Centre	Provincial Capital Commission	1962	50.4325°N 104.6068°W
Welwyn Centennial Regional Park	Saskatchewan Regional Parks Association	1967	50.3408°N 101.5197°W
Whitesand Regional Park	Saskatchewan Regional Parks Association	1965	51.4904°N 102.8944°W
Wilkie Regional Park	Saskatchewan Regional Parks Association	1970	52.4127°N 108.7147°W
Wood Mountain Regional Park	Saskatchewan Regional Parks Association		49.3202°N 106.3825°W
Woodlawn Regional Park	Saskatchewan Regional Parks Association	1962	49.1147°N 102.9857°W
York Lake Regional Park	Saskatchewan Regional Parks Association	1969	51.1652°N 102.4889°W

== Provincial recreation sites ==
The following is a list of Saskatchewan provincial recreation sites:

Name	Location	Notes	Coordinates
Amisk Lake Recreation Site	Northern Administration District		54.6845°N 102.0773°W
Anglin Lake Recreation Site	District of Lakeland No. 521	Former recreation site, now part of Great Blue Heron Provincial Park	53.7021°N 105.9617°W
Arm River Recreation Site	RM of Sarnia No. 221		50.8366°N 105.4431°W
Armit River Recreation Site	RM of Hudson Bay No. 394		52.8302°N 101.6777°W
Beatty Lake Recreation Site	Northern Administration District		54.5108°N 107.8818°W
Beaupré Creek Recreation Site	Northern Administration District		54.5308°N 107.2702°W
Beaver / Cowan Rivers Recreation Site	Northern Administration District		54.4243°N 107.8568°W
Beaver River Recreation Site	RM of Meadow Lake No. 588		54.2965°N 108.6052°W
Besant Recreation Site	RM of Caron No. 162		50.4636°N 105.9617°W
Besnard Lake Recreation Site	Northern Administration District		55.4073°N 106.0682°W
Bethune Recreation Site	RM of Dufferin No. 190	Was a rest area along Highway 11 about 5.5 km (3.4 mi) west of Bethune. It is now closed.	50.7387°N 105.2712°W
Big Sandy Lake Recreation Site	Northern Administration District		54.4849°N 104.1854°W
Big Shell Lake Recreation Site	RM of Spiritwood No. 496		53.2257°N 107.1724°W
Bigstone Cutoff Recreation Site	Northern Administration District		53.9334°N 102.3434°W
Birchbark Lake Recreation Site	RM of Torch River No. 488		53.5291°N 105.0909°W
Bird's Point Recreation Site	Bird's Point		50.5462°N 102.3702°W
Borden Bridge Recreation Site	RM of Corman Park No. 344		52.3779°N 107.1419°W
Boundary Dam Reservoir Recreation Site	RM of Estevan No. 5	Former recreation site, now part of Woodlawn Regional Park	49.0739°N 103.0311°W
Broadview Recreation Site	RM of Elcapo No. 154	Is a rest area 3 km (1.9 mi) east of Broadview on Highway 1	50.3773°N 102.5315°W
Bronson Forest Recreation Site	RM of Loon Lake No. 561		53.9263°N 109.5769°W
Buffalo Narrows Sand Dunes Park	Northern Administration District	Formally 'Big Buffalo Beach Recreation Site', now a park operated by the community of Buffalo Narrows	55.8834°N 108.6007°W
Bug Lake Recreation Site	RM of Big River No. 555		53.9098°N 107.7284°W
Camp 10 Lake Recreation Site	Northern Administration District		54.2562°N 105.9595°W
Canoe Lake Recreation Site	Northern Administration District		55.2119°N 108.3343°W
Chitek Lake Recreation Site	RM of Big River No. 555		53.7532°N 107.7562°W
Coldwell Park Recreation Site	RM of Fertile Valley No. 285		51.3098°N 106.9353°W
Condie Nature Refuge Recreation Site	RM of Sherwood No. 159		50.5613°N 104.7153°W
Courtenay Lake Recreation Site	Northern Administration District		57.3923°N 103.9667°W
Cowan Dam Recreation Site	Northern Administration District		54.1930°N 107.4503°W
Culdesac Lake Recreation Site	RM of Hudson Bay No. 394		53.6389°N 101.7908°W
Cypress Lake Recreation Site	RM of Reno No. 51		49.4554°N 109.5012°W
D. Gerbrandt Recreation Site	RM of Moose Range No. 486	Leased and operated by Thunder Rapids Lodge	53.6891°N 103.3413°W
Dagg Creek Recreation Site	RM of Hudson Bay No. 394	Former recreation site, now part of Hudson Bay Regional Park	52.6417°N 102.4025°W
Dana Recreation Site	RM of Bayne No. 371	A rest area along Highway 2	52.2517°N 105.7551°W
Davin Lake Recreation Site	Northern Administration District		56.8784°N 103.5918°W
Deer Creek Recreation Site	RM of Britannia No. 502 & RM of Frenchman Butte No. 501	The park is bisected by the North Saskatchewan River.	53.5212°N 109.6197°W
Delaronde Lake (Zig Zag Bay) Recreation Site	RM of Big River No. 555		53.9448°N 106.9378°W
Deschambault Lake (South East Arm) Recreation Site	Northern Administration District		54.7062°N 103.2346°W
Devil Lake Recreation Site	Northern Administration District	Former recreation site, now part of Lac La Ronge Provincial Park	55.6597°N 104.7293°W
Dore Lake Recreation Site	Northern Administration District	Located at Michel Point on Doré Lake	54.6985°N 107.2332°W
Dragline Channel Recreation Site	Northern Administration District		53.8332°N 102.9437°W
Duff Recreation Site	RM of Stanley No. 215		50.8806°N 103.0463°W
East Trout–Nipekamew Lakes Recreation Site	Northern Administration District		54.3566°N 104.9771°W
Elaine Lake Recreation Site	Northern Administration District		54.4302°N 106.3536°W
Elbow Harbour Recreation Site	RM of Loreburn No. 254		51.1082°N 106.6075°W
Emma Lake (Murray Point) Recreation Site	District of Lakeland No. 521	Former recreation site, now part of Great Blue Heron Provincial Park	53.6039°N 105.9266°W
Etters Beach Recreation Site	Etters Beach		51.2354°N 105.3001°W
Fir River Road Recreation Site	RM of Hudson Bay No. 394		53.0821°N 102.6653°W
Fowler Lake Recreation Site	RM of Loon Lake No. 561		54.0184°N 109.4142°W
Geikie River Recreation Site	Northern Administration District		57.7064°N 103.9513°W
Gordon Lake Recreation Site	Northern Administration District		55.7814°N 106.5456°W
Granite Lake Recreation Site	Northern Administration District		54.8638°N 102.5292°W
Greenbush River Recreation Site	RM of Hudson Bay No. 394	Former recreation site, now part of Hudson Bay Regional Park	52.8492°N 102.6875°W
Hanson Lake Recreation Site	Northern Administration District		54.6775°N 102.8561°W
Helene Lake Recreation Site	RM of Parkdale No. 498		53.5462°N 108.2258°W
Heritage Lake Recreation Site	RM of Paddockwood No. 520		53.9301°N 105.1438°W
Island Lake Recreation Site	RM of Meadow Lake No. 588		53.9745°N 107.7381°W
Jayjay Lake Recreation Site	Northern Administration District		54.5136°N 104.2256°W
Lac Île-à-la-Crosse (South Bay) Recreation Site	Northern Administration District	Also known as 'Ile a la Crosse War Veterans Park Campground'	55.3559°N 107.8676°W
Jan Lake Recreation Site	Northern Administration District		54.8845°N 102.8169°W
Langenburg Recreation Site	RM of Langenburg No. 181	Picnic area on the south side of Langenburg	50.8313°N 101.7078°W
Lebret Recreation Site	Lebret	Located at Haffern Beach at Lebret on Mission Lake. Has a boat launch and picnic area.	50.7541°N 103.7041°W
Limestone Lake Recreation Site	Northern Administration District		54.6807°N 103.1888°W
Little Amyot Lake Recreation Site	Northern Administration District		55.1806°N 107.8173°W
Little Bear Lake Recreation Site	Northern Administration District		54.3011°N 104.6710°W
Lovering Lake Recreation Site	RM of Craik No. 222		50.8420°N 105.6266°W
MacLennan River Recreation Site	Northern Administration District		54.2088°N 105.9798°W
Margo Recreation Site	RM of Sasman No. 336		51.8532°N 103.3975°W
McBride Lake Recreation Site	RM of Hudson Bay No. 394	Former recreation site, now part of Porcupine Hills Provincial Park	52.4582°N 102.3788°W
Meridian Creek Recreation Site	Northern Administration District		54.5392°N 102.1352°W
Montreal River Recreation Site	Northern Administration District		54.7209°N 105.6966°W
Mountain Cabin Recreation Site	RM of Hudson Bay No. 394		53.5838°N 102.1245°W
Norvil Olson Recreation Site	Northern Administration District	Located at the southern end of Reindeer Lake	56.3360°N 103.2825°W
Ness Lake Recreation Site	RM of Big River No. 555		53.8863°N 106.8007°W
Nesset Lake Recreation Site	RM of Meadow Lake No. 588		54.0765°N 108.6449°W
Nesslin Lake Recreation Site	RM of Big River No. 555		53.9384°N 106.7745°W
Overflowing River Recreation Site	RM of Hudson Bay No. 394	Is an ecological reserve where Highway 9 crosses the Overflowing River, about 20 km (12 mi) north of Hudson Bay	53.0332°N 102.3151°W
Pagan Lake Recreation Site	RM of Meadow Lake No. 588		54.3186°N 108.2951°W
Parr Hill Lake Recreation Site	RM of Hudson Bay No. 394	Former recreation site, now part of Porcupine Hills Provincial Park	52.3792°N 102.1876°W
Pasquia Hills North Recreation Site	RM of Hudson Bay No. 394	Is a small campground on the northern slopes of the Pasquia Hills	53.5379°N 102.3475°W
Pasquia River Recreation Site	RM of Hudson Bay No. 394	Is a picnic area along Highway 9 and Pasquia River	53.2552°N 102.1144°W
Pepaw Lake Recreation Site	RM of Hudson Bay No. 394	Former recreation site, now part of Porcupine Hills Provincial Park	52.4246°N 102.2174°W
Petrofka Recreation Site	RM of Blaine Lake No. 434		52.6578°N 106.8586°W
Piprell Lake Recreation Site	Northern Administration District		54.1546°N 104.9023°W
Piwei River Recreation Site	RM of Porcupine No. 395		52.4843°N 102.9883°W
Puskwakau River Recreation Site	Northern Administration District		54.5104°N 103.5278°W
Raymore Recreation Site	RM of Mount Hope No. 279	A rustic campground about 5 km (3.1 mi) north of Raymore along Highway 6	51.4546°N 104.5402°W
Regina Beach Recreation Site	Regina Beach		50.7926°N 104.9751°W
Roche Percee Recreation Site	RM of Coalfields No. 4		49.0762°N 102.7485°W
Round Lake Recreation Site	RM of Kelvington No. 366		52.3594°N 103.3926°W
Ruby Lake Recreation Site	RM of Hudson Bay No. 394	Former recreation site, now part of Hudson Bay Regional Park	52.9600°N 102.3491°W
Saginas Lake Recreation Site	RM of Hudson Bay No. 394	Former recreation site, now part of Porcupine Hills Provincial Park	52.5101°N 108.1698°W
Saint Cyr Hills Trails Recreation Site	RM of Meadow Lake No. 588		54.2044°N 104.8414°W
Saskatchewan River Forks Recreation Site	RM of Prince Albert No. 461		53.2304°N 105.0843°W
Shell Lake Recreation Site	RM of Big River No. 555		53.8275°N 107.6078°W
Shirley Lake Recreation Site	Northern Administration District		54.4881°N 107.2521°W
Smoothstone Lake Recreation Site	Northern Administration District		54.5926°N 106.9588°W
Sturgeon River Recreation Site	RM of Buckland No. 491		53.2121°N 105.8854°W
Taylor Lake Recreation Site	Northern Administration District		56.0438°N 108.6709°W
Tobin Lake Recreation Site	RM of Torch River No. 488		53.5177°N 103.8024°W
Turtle Lake Recreation Site	RM of Parkdale No. 498		53.6157°N 108.5826°W
Valeport Recreation Site	RM of Longlaketon No. 219		50.7478°N 104.8709°W
Wapiti Recreation Site	RM of Torch River No. 488	Part of Wapiti Valley Regional Park	53.2611°N 104.4677°W
Wascana Trails	RM of Sherwood No. 159	Formally known as 'Wascana Valley Nature Recreation Site'	50.5571°N 104.8414°W
Waskesiu River Recreation Site	Northern Administration District		54.0804°N 105.9401°W
Waterhen River Recreation Site	Northern Administration District		54.6412°N 107.8178°W
Weyakwin Lake (Ramsey Bay) Recreation Site	Northern Administration District		54.4472°N 105.9748°W
White Butte Trails Recreation Site	RM of Edenwold No. 158	Cross-country ski area	50.4765°N 104.3676°W
Whitesand River Recreation Site	RM of Good Lake No. 274		51.5295°N 102.4536°W
Whiteswan Lake (Whelan Bay) Recreation Site	Northern Administration District		54.0326°N 105.1087°W
Wollaston Lake (Hidden Bay) Recreation Site	Northern Administration District		58.1006°N 103.7904°W
Woody River Recreation Site	RM of Hudson Bay No. 394	Former recreation site, now part of Porcupine Hills Provincial Park	52.4791°N 101.7009°W

== Wildlife refuges ==
The following is a list of Saskatchewan provincial wildlife refuges:

Name	Location	Notes	Coordinates
Backes Island Wildlife Refuge	Northern Saskatchewan Administration District		54.9583°N 109.7073°W
Bazill Wildlife Refuge	Northern Saskatchewan Administration District		54.7268°N 107.5241°W
Fairy Island Wildlife Refuge	District of Lakeland No. 521	A protected island in Emma Lake	53.6187°N 105.9463°W
Fishing Lake Wildlife Refuge	RM of Sasman No. 336		51.8667°N 103.5505°W
Frenchman River Wildlife Refuge	RM of Val Marie No. 17	A protected area within the Frenchman River watershed	49.05002°N 107.6339°W
Gatehouse Island Wildlife Refuge	Northern Saskatchewan Administration District		55.5834°N 108.3507°W
Heglund Island Wildlife Refuge	RM of Reno No. 51		49.4726°N 109.4615°W
Hidden Valley Wildlife Refuge	RM of Lumsden No. 189	A protected area on the south bank of the Qu'Appelle River	50.7167°N 104.7172°W
Horseshoe Lake Wildlife Refuge	RM of Good Lake No. 274	A 65 ha (160-acre) protected area at Horseshoe Lake operated by Nature Conservancy Canada	51.4667°N 102.6005°W
Ingvald Opseth Wildlife Refuge	RM of Invergordon No. 430	A protected area at the northern end of Dickson (also spelt Dixon) Lake, which is a lake along the course of the Carrot River	52.8499°N 105.3267°W
Isle of Bays Wildlife Refuge	RM of Hillsborough No. 132	The refuge encompasses all of Isle of Bays in Old Wives Lake	50.1167°N 105.9173°W
Janusson Wildlife Refuge	RM of Foam Lake No. 276		51.6833°N 103.5172°W
Lenore Lake Wildlife Refuge	RM of Lake Lenore No. 399		52.5334°N 104.9505°W
Mud Lake Wildlife Refuge	RM of Lakeside No. 338		51.9333°N 104.2172°W
Nisku Wildlife Refuge	RM of Huron No. 223		50.9334°N 106.1673°W
Osage Wildlife Refuge	RM of Fillmore No. 96		49.9334°N 103.5505°W
Preston Lake Wildlife Refuge	Northern Saskatchewan Administration District	A protected island near the western shore of Preston Lake	57.4049°N 109.1833°W
Redberry Wildlife Refuge	RM of Redberry No. 435		52.7001°N 107.2006°W
Rock Island Wildlife Refuge	Northern Saskatchewan Administration District		54.7249°N 107.1628°W
Scheelhaase Island Wildlife Refuge	Northern Saskatchewan Administration District		54.3501°N 102.8171°W

== Provincial forests ==
- Canwood Provincial Forest
- Fort à la Corne Provincial Forest
- Nisbet Provincial Forest
- Northern Provincial Forest
- Porcupine Provincial Forest
- Torch River Provincial Forest

== Ecological reserves ==
- Bainbridge River Ecological Reserve
- Big Valley Lake Ecological Reserve
- Caribou Flats Ecological Reserve
- Fir River Ecological Reserve
- Great Sandhills Ecological Reserve
- Greenbush River Ecological Reserve
- Little Armit River Ecological Reserve
- Pasquia River Ecological Reserve
- Lobstick Lake Ecological Reserve
- Lower Armit River Ecological Reserve
- Nitenai Salt Marsh Ecological Reserve
- North Armit River Ecological Reserve
- Overflowing River Ecological Reserve
- Pink Lake Representative Area Ecological Reserve
- Red Deer River Ecological Reserve
- Rice River Canyon Ecological Reserve
- Smoking Tent Creek Ecological Reserve
- Upper Armit River Ecological Reserve

== Nature Saskatchewan ==
There are six nature sanctuaries managed and inventoried through Nature Saskatchewan.

- Brandon Land
- Crooked Lake Fen
- Maurice G. Street Wildlife
- Rendek Elm Forest
- Turtle Lake
- Van Brienen Land

== Other sites with provincial protection ==
The list of protected areas below comes from the Parks Act.

- Anderson Island
- Bakken – Wright Bison Drive
- Besant Midden
- Brockelbank Hill
- Christopher Lake
- Fort Black
- Glen Ewen Burial Mound
- Grasslands Protected Area
- Gray Archaeological Site
- Gull Lake
- Harder Archaeological Site
- Hickson – Maribelli Lakes Pictographs
- Lemsford Ferry Tipi Rings
- Macdowall Bog
- Massold Clay Canyons
- Matador Grasslands
- Maurice Street Wildlife Sanctuary
- Minton Turtle Effigy
- Nipekamew Sand Cliffs
- Ogema Boulder Effigy
- Pine Island Trading Post
- Thomas Battersby
- Valeport Wildlife Management Area
- Walter Felt Bison Drive
- Waskwei River Protected Area

== National Wildlife Areas ==
#	Label	Area	Established	Notes	Coordinates
1	Bradwell NWA	RM of Blucher No. 343	1968		51.9084°N 106.2506°W
2	Last Mountain Lake NWA	RM of Wreford No. 280	1994		51.3667°N 105.2339°W
3	Raven Island NWA	RM of Lake Lenore No. 399	1982		52.4417°N 105.0005°W
4	Stalwart NWA	RM of Big Arm No. 251	1968		51°13'19.7"N 105°24'40.8"W
5	St. Denis NWA	RM of Grant No. 372	1967	Public access prohibited without permit	
6	Tway NWA	RM of Invergordon No. 430	1971		52.7584°N 105.4172°W
7	Webb NWA	RM of Webb No. 138	1980		50°12'05.7"N 108°09'09.5"W
8	Thickwood Hills NWA		2025	32 km (20 mi) north-west of Blaine Lake in the Thickwood Hills	52.95°N 107.17°W
9	Moose Mountain Creek NWA		2025		
10	Harris Sandhills NWA		2025		
11	Great Sandhills NWA		2025		
12	Longspur NWA		2025		
13	Prairie NWA	Saskatchewan	1977	Properties located throughout Saskatchewan. For further location details visit: CWS Prairie NWA	

== Migratory Bird Sanctuaries ==
#	Label	Area	Established	Coordinates
1	Basin and Middle Lakes MBS	8,720 ha (21,500 acres)	1925	
2	Duncairn Reservoir MBS	1,546 ha (3,820 acres)	1948	
3	Indian Head MBS	32 ha (79 acres)	1924	
4	Last Mountain Lake MBS	4,736 ha (11,700 acres)	1887	
5	Lenore Lake MBS	8,830 ha (21,800 acres)	1925	
6	Murray Lake MBS	1,165 ha (2,880 acres)	1948	
7	Neely Lake MBS	809 ha (2,000 acres)	1952	
8	Old Wives Lake MBS	26,060 ha (64,400 acres)	1925	
9	Opuntia Lake MBS	1,391 ha (3,440 acres)	1952	51.8001°N 108.5674°W
10	Redberry Lake MBS	6,395 ha (15,800 acres)	1925	
11	Scent Grass Lake MBS	633 ha (1,560 acres)	1948	
12	Sutherland MBS	130 ha (320 acres)	1924	
13	Upper Rousay Lake MBS	518 ha (1,280 acres)	1948	
14	Val Marie Reservoir MBS	505 ha (1,250 acres)	1948	
15	Wascana Lake MBS	104 ha (260 acres)	1956	

== Nature Conservancy Canada properties ==
#	Label	Rural Municipality	Established	Notes	Size	Coordinates
1	Old Man on His Back	RM of Frontier No. 19				49°12'50.1"N 109°12'15.8"W
2	Wideview	RM of Mankota No. 45				49°08'44.0"N 107°11'08.6"W
3	Key West	RM of Key West No. 70				49°43'54.1"N 105°04'54.2"W
4	Saskairie	RM of Moose Mountain No. 63	1974			49°42'24.0"N 102°23'06.1"W
5	Mortach	RM of Wheatlands No. 163				50°20'41.5"N 106°05'47.9"W
6	Thunder Creek	RM of Eyebrow No. 193				50°40'24.3"N 106°14'40.1"W
7	Stark Coulee	RM of Marquis No. 191				50°47'40.8"N 105°51'23.9"W
8	Big Valley	RM of Lumsden No. 189				50°44'20.5"N 104°53'19.1"W
9	Lumsden Beach	RM of Lumsden No. 189				50°45'53.3"N 104°55'43.7"W
10	Fairy Hill South	RM of Lumsden No. 189				50°46'46.7"N 104°35'50.5"W
11	Edenwold	RM of Edenwold No. 158				50°43'53.2"N 104°15'38.6"W
12	Buffalo Valley	RM of King George No. 256				51°01'10.8"N 107°33'34.5"W
13	Punnichy	RM of Kutawa No. 278				51°22'55.6"N 104°18'34.4"W
14	Upper White Sand	RM of Invermay No. 305				51°43'31.5"N 103°15'10.5"W
15	Big Quill Lake	RM of Big Quill No. 308				51°44'40.6"N 104°32'21.1"W
16	Maymont	RM of Eagle Creek No. 376				52°29'04.4"N 107°42'36.2"W
17	Nebo	RM of Canwood No. 494				53°16'04.8"N 106°43'12.1"W
18	Valley View	RM of Lumsden No. 188				
19	Buffalo Pound	RM of Craik No. 222	2020			
20	Mackie Ranch	RM of Chaplin No. 164	2021	Eastern shore of Chaplin Lake	646 ha (1,600 acres)	
21	Frenchman River Watershed			Frenchman River		

== National Historic Sites ==
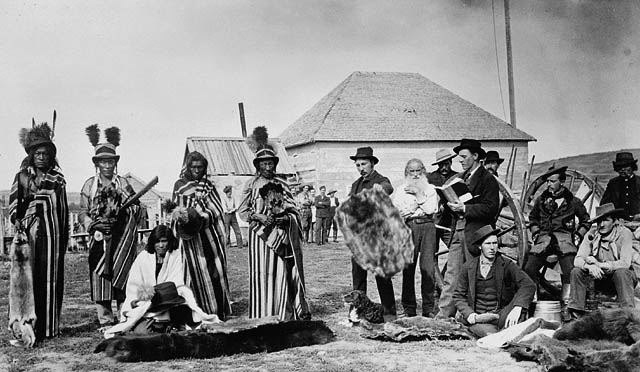
Big Bear at Fort Pitt

There are 49 National Historic Sites designated in Saskatchewan, 10 of which are administered by Parks Canada.

== See also ==
- List of nature centres in Saskatchewan
- List of Canadian protected areas
- List of National Parks of Canada
