= Bainbridge River =

River in Saskatchewan, Canada

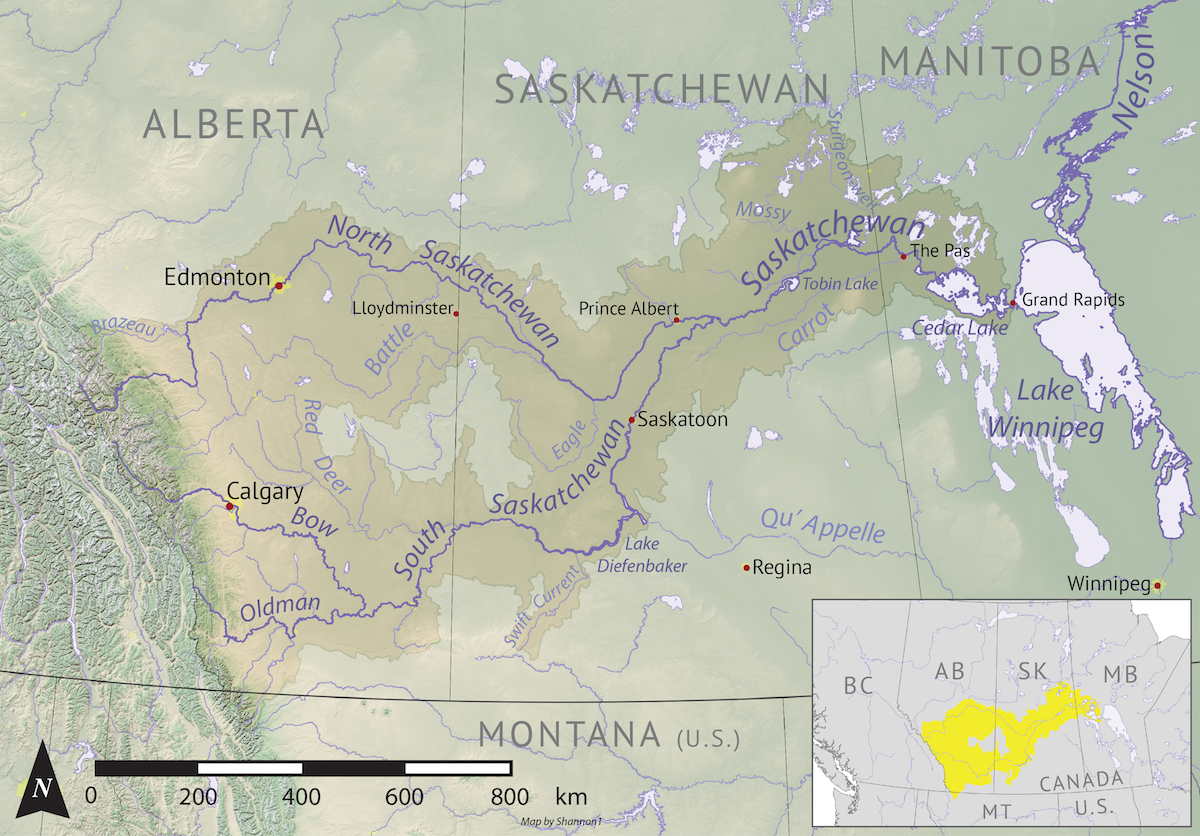
- Map of Saskatchewan River drainage basin

- Location of the river's mouth in Saskatchewan Bainbridge River (Canada)

Location
- Country: Canada
- Province: Saskatchewan
- Rural municipality: Hudson Bay No. 394

Physical characteristics
- Source: Twin Lakes
  - location: Pasquia Hills
  - coordinates: 53.5088°N 102.229°W
- Mouth: Whitepoplar Creek
  - location: Saskatchewan River Delta
  - coordinates: 53.55004°N 101.9838°W

Basin features
- Progression: Whitepoplar Creek; Waskwei River; Pasquia River; Saskatchewan River
- River system: Saskatchewan River

Bainbridge River is a river in the RM of Hudson Bay No. 394 in Saskatchewan, Canada. It begins at Twin Lakes in the Pasquia Hills and flows east to Whitepoplar Creek at the southern edge of the Saskatchewan River Delta. Along the river's course, it flows through a fossil bonebed, the Bainbridge River Ecological Reserve, crosses Highway 9, and runs past Mountain Cabin Recreation Site. It meets Whitepoplar Creek near Helldiver Lake. Whitepoplar Creek is a tributary of Waskwei River.

== Bainbridge River Ecological Reserve ==
The Bainbridge River Ecological Reserve covers 10.36 square kilometres (4.00 sq mi) and was established in 2004. The reserve begins at Bainbridge River on the west side of Highway 9 and follows the river upstream encompassing much of the gully that the river flows through.

== Bainbridge River Bonebed ==
Along the course of the river, there is a fossil bonebed (53.4806°N 102.241°W) from the Upper / Late Cretaceous (Mid-Cenomanian Event) period from between 99.6 – 93.5 Ma. The fossils are found in areas of mass wasting and mudstone outcrops. Some of the fossilised marine species found in the bonebed include pachyrhizodus minimus, ichthyodectes ctenodon, crow shark, ptychodus anonymus, enchodus gladiolus, and dallasiella willistoni.

== See also ==
- List of rivers of Saskatchewan
- Hudson Bay drainage basin
- List of protected areas of Saskatchewan
