= Fir River =

River in Saskatchewan, Canada

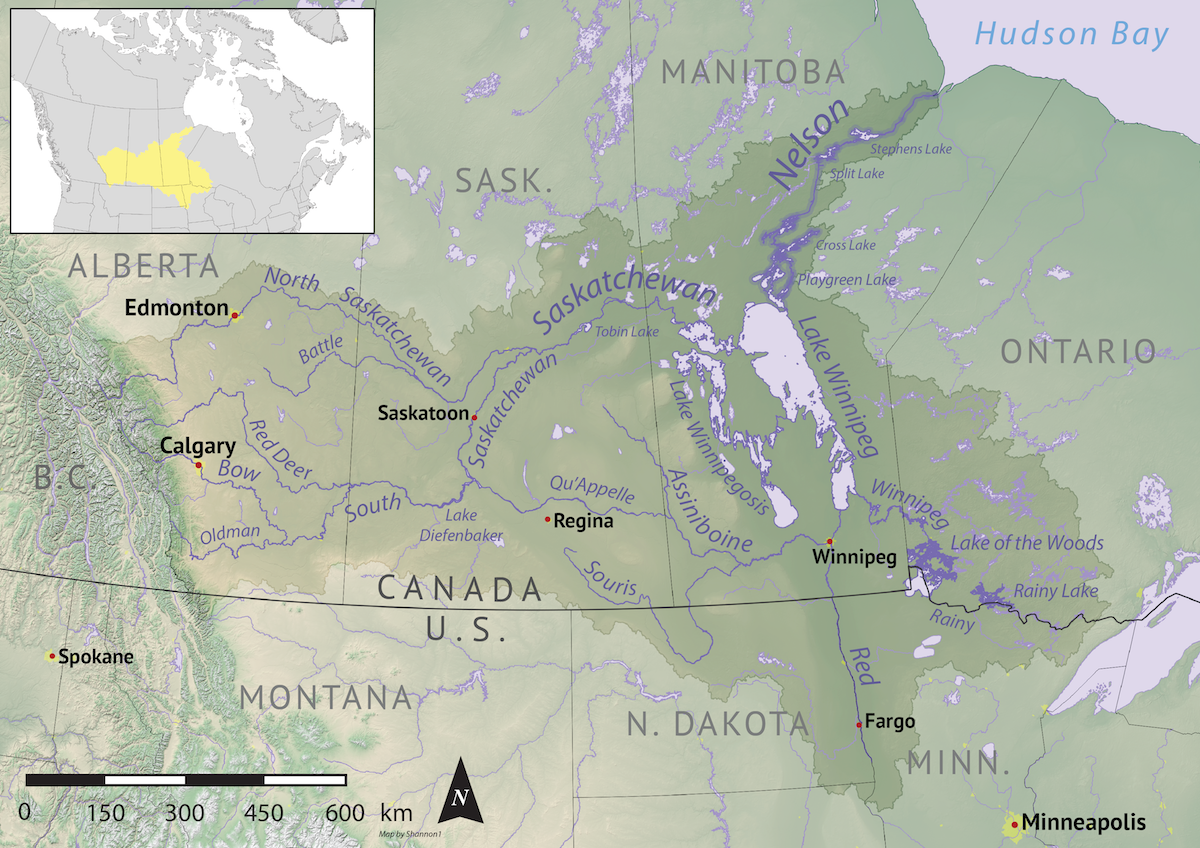
- Nelson River drainage basin

- Location of mouth in Saskatchewan Fir River (Canada)

Location
- Country: Canada
- Province: Saskatchewan
- Rural municipality: RM of Hudson Bay No. 394

Physical characteristics
- Source: Pasquia Hills
  - location: Wildcat Hill Provincial Park
  - coordinates: 53.2297°N 102.4429°W
- Mouth: Red Deer River
  - location: Hudson Bay Regional Park
  - coordinates: 52.8185°N 102.3785°W
  - elevation: 363 m (1,191 ft)

Basin features
- River system: Red Deer River drainage basin
- Tributaries
  - right: Nonsuch Creek

Fir River is a river in the Canadian province of Saskatchewan. The river's source is in the east central part of the province in the heart of the Pasquia Hills, which is one of four landforms that make up the Manitoba Escarpment. It flows in a southward direction until it meets up with the Red Deer River south of the town of Hudson Bay in Hudson Bay Regional Park. The river is in the boreal forest. Fir River is in the Nelson River drainage basin.

Fir River begins at a small lake in the south-east corner of Wildcat Hill Provincial Park in the Pasquia Hills. The lake is in a small valley just west of Bankside Lake, which flows into Man River. While Fir River heads south towards Red Deer River, Man River eventually makes its way northward and is in the Saskatchewan River watershed. Wildcat Hill (53.2995°N 102.4836°W), while in the Man River watershed, is only about 6.5 kilometres (4.0 mi) north of Fir River's source. The Pasquia River's source is just on the north-east side of Bankside Lake and it flows north-east and into the Saskatchewan River at The Pas, Manitoba.

== Course ==
From Fir River's source, it flows southward towards Overflow Lake (the source of Overflowing River) where it turns north-west until it meets a valley. The river flows into the valley and heads south past several small lakes, including Bell, Chartier, Dagg, and Rat. As the river comes out of the hills, it passes through Fir River Road Recreation Site and Fir River Eco Reserve en route to Hudson Bay and the Red Deer River. As it approaches Hudson Bay, the land flattens out and it is met by Nonsuch Creek just north-west of town. At the mouth of the river, is Hudson Bay Regional Park, which features camping, golfing, and picnicking. The park is also the site of historical fur trading forts, most notably Fort Red Deer River.

== Fir River Road Recreation Site ==
Fir River Road Recreation Site (53.0821°N 102.6653°W) is a provincial recreation park along Fir River and Fir River Road that is divided into two sections—one at mile marker 16 and the other at mile marker 21. Activities at the recreation site include picnicking, ATVing, fishing, and hunting. Brook trout can be found in the river. In the winter, there are two warm-up shacks for snowmobilers that are maintained by the local snowmobile club.

The recreation site also provides access to Fir River Ecological Reserve.

== See also ==
- List of rivers of Saskatchewan
- Hudson Bay drainage basin
- Tourism in Saskatchewan
- Etomami River
- Assiniboine River fur trade
