= Culdesac Lake =

Lake in Western Canada

- Location in Saskatchewan Culdesac Lake (Canada)
- Location: RM of Hudson Bay No. 394, Saskatchewan and Northern Manitoba
- Coordinates: 53.6208°N 101.7692°W
- Part of: Saskatchewan River drainage basin
- Primary inflows: Culdesac River
- Basin countries: Canada
- Surface area: 764 ha (1,890 acres)
- Shore length^{1}: 14 km (8.7 mi)
- Settlements: None
- ^{1} Shore length is not a well-defined measure.

Culdesac Lake is a lake in the Canadian provinces of Saskatchewan and Manitoba. It is situated in the Saskatchewan River Delta and is in the Mid-Boreal Lowland ecoregion. It is surrounded by muskeg and boreal forest. Its primary inflow is from a channel connected to Culdesac River, which is a tributary of the Carrot River. An outlet from the eastern end of Culdesac Lake connects it to the Pasquia River — a tributary of the Saskatchewan River. The lake falls within the Cumberland Marshes (SK 102) Important Bird Area of Canada.

Most of Culdesac Lake is in the RM of Hudson Bay No. 394 in Saskatchewan while only the eastern most end is in Northern Manitoba. There are no communities along the lake's shore and Highway 9 is the closest highway. On the northern shore is a Saskatchewan provincial recreation site.

== Culdesac Lake Recreation Site ==
Culdesac Lake Recreation Site (53.6389°N 101.7908°W) is located on the northern shore of Culdesac Lake at the lake's primary inflow. The park was established in 1986. At 60 hectares (150 acres), it is a small park that has a rustic campground and provides access to the lake for fishing and boating. It is about 15 kilometres (9.3 mi) south of Highway 9.

== See also ==
- List of lakes of Saskatchewan
- List of lakes of Manitoba
