= Mountain Cabin Recreation Site =

Recreation site in Saskatchewan, Canada

Mountain Cabin
- Recreation area
- Location within Saskatchewan Location within Canada
- Coordinates: 53.5837787°N 102.1244641°W
- Country: Canada
- Province: Saskatchewan
- Census division: 14
- Rural Municipality: Hudson Bay No. 394
- Established: 1917

Government
  - MP: Cathay Wagantall
  - MLA: Fred Bradshaw
- Time zone: UTC-6 (CST)
- Postal code: S0E 1G0
- Area code: 306
- Highways: Highway 9 / Highway 55 (Northern Woods and Water Route)

Mountain Cabin Recreation Site is a recreation site, and former settlement, near the north-eastern ridge of the Pasquia Hills in Canadian province of Saskatchewan.

The recreation area is near Bainbridge River and has free camping, fire pits, a shelter, and bathrooms, and is one of the closest free camping areas to Wildcat Hill Provincial Park.

It is located at the junction of Highways 9 and 55, approximately 88 kilometres (55 mi) north of Hudson Bay, 76 kilometres (47 mi) south of The Pas, and 42 kilometres (26 mi) east of Pakwaw Lake.

The Pasquia Hills are sometimes known as the Pasquia Mountains, or The Pas Mountains, which is where the word Mountain comes from in the name. The original cabin belonged to a mining prospector, and was embedded into the side of a hill.

Another potential origin of the name comes from the Forest Ranger cabin in the area. From 1906 to 1930, the Dominion Forest Service built over a dozen ranger cabins in the Pasquia National Forest Reserve, including one at the mouth of Mountain Creek, which originates in the Pasquia Hills and empties into the Nitenai River. The cabin was officially called Mountain Creek Cabin, but was often shortened to Mountain Cabin, even in official correspondence. The Mountain Creek Cabin was destroyed by a fire in 1961.

== See also ==
- List of communities in Saskatchewan
- List of protected areas of Saskatchewan
