= List of Saskatchewan provincial forests =

In Saskatchewan, Provincial Forests are designated as such by the Lieutenant Governor in Council, as per The Forest Resources Management Act.

In 1930, the Saskatchewan Natural Resources Act gave the province control over forest resources within its boundaries. Before 1930, forests in Saskatchewan were under federal control, and many of the Provincial Forests listed below were classified as National Forests under the Dominion Forest Reserves Act.

== Official list ==
The official list of Saskatchewan Provincial Forests can be found in The Forest Resources Management Regulations:

- Canwood Provincial Forest
- Fort à la Corne Provincial Forest
- Nisbet Provincial Forest
- Northern Provincial Forest
- Porcupine Provincial Forest
- Torch River Provincial Forest

== Northern provincial forest ==
From a legal perspective, all of the contiguous forestland in Northern Saskatchewan is one forest. In other contexts, several distinct forests are identified.

- Pasquia Provincial Forest
- Suggi Lowlands Provincial Forest

== Other forests with provincial protection ==
The two laws in Saskatchewan that protect forestland are the Forest Resources Management Act and the Parks Act. The Forest Resources Management Act and Regulations are written so that the Parks Act is applicable whenever land area is defined in both laws. The Parks Act provides stronger protections for forests than the Forest Resources Management Act. For example, in provincial parks, no trees can be cut without a permit, whereas in provincial forests, individuals can harvest Christmas trees and collect dead and fallen trees for fuelwood.

The forests of the Cypress Hills and Moose Mountain are protected by the Parks Act, and are therefore provincially-protected, but the forests are not officially provincial forests.

Duck Mountain Provincial Forest is also protected in Saskatchewan by the Parks Act, and the Manitoba portion is classified as a provincial forest in that province.

Bronson Forest, located between Paradise Hill and Pierceland, is not protected under the Forest Resources Management Act or the Parks Act, but the Protection of the Wild Ponies of the Bronson Forest Act prohibits any activities in the Bronson Forest that could negatively impact the wild horses.

== See also ==
- List of protected areas of Saskatchewan
- Forests of Canada
