= Birchbark Lake =

Lake in Saskatchewan, Canada

- Location in Saskatchewan Birchbark Lake (Canada)
- Location: Saskatchewan
- Coordinates: 53.5501°N 105.1169°W
- Part of: Saskatchewan River drainage basin
- Primary outflows: Birchbark Creek
- Basin countries: Canada
- Surface area: 1,134.62 ha (2,803.7 acres)
- Max. depth: 3.2 m (10 ft)
- Shore length^{1}: 28 km (17 mi)
- Surface elevation: 502 m (1,647 ft)
- ^{1} Shore length is not a well-defined measure.

Birchbark Lake is a lake in the central part of the Canadian province of Saskatchewan. Most of the western half of the lake is in the RM of Paddockwood No. 520, while the eastern side is in the RM of Torch River No. 488. A provincial recreation site is located on the south-eastern shore of the lake and access is from a grid road connecting to Highway 55.

Birchbark Lake is in the Boreal Transition ecozone and is surrounded by a forest of trembling aspen, balsam poplar, white spruce, and balsam fir. Birchbark Creek flows out from the north end of the lake and into Hunt Lake. From Hunt Lake, the creek continues north into Torch Lake, which is connected to Candle Lake via Fisher Creek. Candle Lake is the source of the Torch River, a tributary of the Saskatchewan River.

== Birchbark Lake Recreation Site ==
Birchbark Lake Recreation Site (53.5291°N 105.0909°W) is a provincial campground in the RM of Torch River located on the south-eastern shore of Birchbark Lake. The campground is small and free with no facilities. There is lake access for fishing and boating.

== See also ==
- List of lakes of Saskatchewan
- Tourism in Saskatchewan
