= Kazan Lake =

Lake in Saskatchewan, Canada

- Location in Saskatchewan Kazan Lake (Canada)
- Location: Northern Administration District, Saskatchewan
- Coordinates: 55.5831°N 108.3341°W
- Part of: Churchill River drainage basin
- Primary outflows: Kazan River
- Basin countries: Canada
- Max. length: 16 km (9.9 mi)
- Max. width: 10 km (6.2 mi)
- Surface area: 8,369.1 ha (20,680 acres)
- Shore length^{1}: 67 km (42 mi)
- Surface elevation: 431 m (1,414 ft)
- Islands: Sharp Island; Gatehouse Island; Nichol Island
- Settlements: None
- ^{1} Shore length is not a well-defined measure.

Kazan Lake is a lake about 30 kilometres (19 mi) south of the village of Buffalo Narrows in the Canadian province of Saskatchewan. The lake is surrounded by muskeg and boreal forest, with black spruce being the most common tree. Several small streams feed into the lake while its outflow is the Kazan River. The Kazan River flows out of the lake at the north end and travels north for about 15 kilometres (9.3 mi) before emptying into Peter Pond Lake. Peter Pond Lake is at the headwaters of the Churchill River.

Situated in Crown land, the entirety of Kazan Lake is within an Important Bird Area of Canada. Near the north end of the lake is the three-hectare Gatehouse Island Wildlife Refuge (55.5834°N 108.3507°W). There are no communities on the lake and Highway 155 is the nearest highway.

Fish commonly found in Kazan Lake include walleye, northern pike, burbot, white sucker, and yellow perch.

== Kazan Lake IBA ==
The Kazan Lake (SK 110) Important Bird Area (IBA) of Canada encompasses 249.18 km^{2} (96.21 sq mi) of the lake and surrounding shoreline. The IBA is important habitat for American white pelicans and double-crested cormorants. Other birds found there include the great blue heron and the osprey.

== GeoMemorial Commemorative Naming Program ==
The GeoMemorial Commemorative Naming Program is a program that names geographical features in honour of those who lost their lives in the service of Canada. There are several features related to Kazan Lake named through this program.

- Sharp Island — Andrew Sharp
- Nichol Island — Walter Wilson Nichol
- Shaw Bay — Robert Simpson Shaw
- Reid Bay — John Bertram Reid

== See also ==
- List of lakes of Saskatchewan
- List of protected areas of Saskatchewan
