= Waskwei River =

River in Saskatchewan, Canada

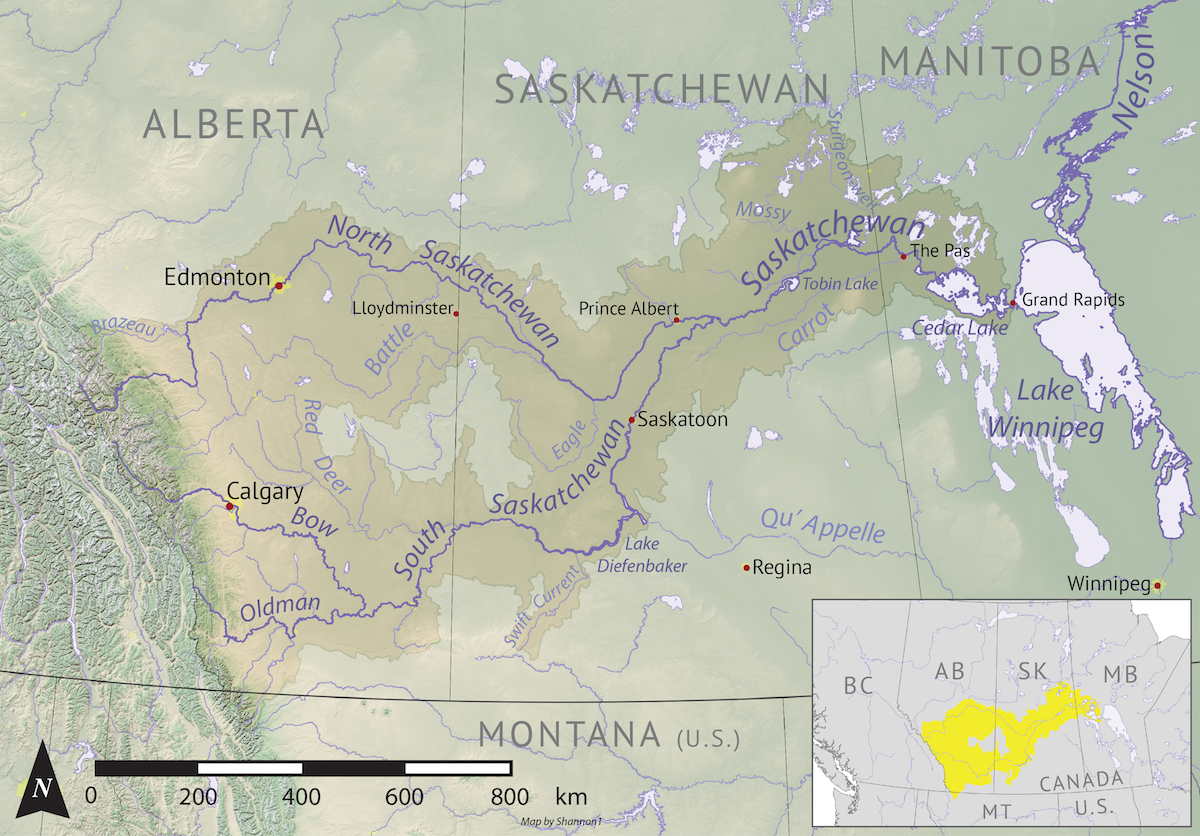
- Map of Saskatchewan River drainage basin

- Location of the river's mouth in Saskatchewan Waskwei River (Canada)

Location
- Country: Canada
- Province: Saskatchewan
- Rural municipality: Hudson Bay No. 394

Physical characteristics
- Source
  - location: Pasquia Hills
  - coordinates: 53.4317°N 102.2825°W
- Mouth: Pasquia River
  - location: Saskatchewan River Delta
  - coordinates: 53.5731°N 101.7695°W

Basin features
- Progression: Pasquia River; Saskatchewan River
- River system: Saskatchewan River
- Tributaries
  - left: Stony Creek; Whitepoplar Creek
  - right: Schell Creek; Niska Creek

Waskwei River is a river in the Rural Municipality of Hudson Bay No. 394 in Saskatchewan, Canada. It begins in the Pasquia Hills of the Manitoba Escarpment and flows in an easterly direction to the Pasquia River in the Saskatchewan River Delta. The Saskatchewan River Delta, also known as the Cumberland Marshes, is the largest inland river delta in North America.

There is small protected area along the river where it crosses Highway 9. There are no communities along the river.

== Course ==
Waskwei River begins in the forested Pasquia Hills at a small lake at an elevation of over 800 metres (2,600 ft). It flows eastward through the Pasquia Provincial Forest and out of the hills through a gully. As it leaves the hills, it enters the Waskwei River Protected Area (53.4202°N 102.0526°W) and crosses Highway 9. The terrain flattens out and the river continues east for a short distance before turning north towards the Saskatchewan River Delta. As it approaches the delta, it is joined by Schell and Stony Creeks. Once in the delta, it turns east, is met by several tributaries, and runs past multiple lakes, including Helldiver, Niska, and Turnberry. Waskwei River's mouth is at Nosamwokwu Lake, which is a lake along the course of the Pasquia River.

=== Tributaries ===
Waskwei River's tributaries include:

Left

- Stony Creek
- Thickbush Creek
- Sale Creek
- Whitepoplar River
  - Bainbridge River

Right

- Schell Creek
- Niska Creek

== See also ==
- List of rivers of Saskatchewan
- Hudson Bay drainage basin
- List of protected areas of Saskatchewan
