= Nickle Lake =

Reservoir in Saskatchewan, Canada

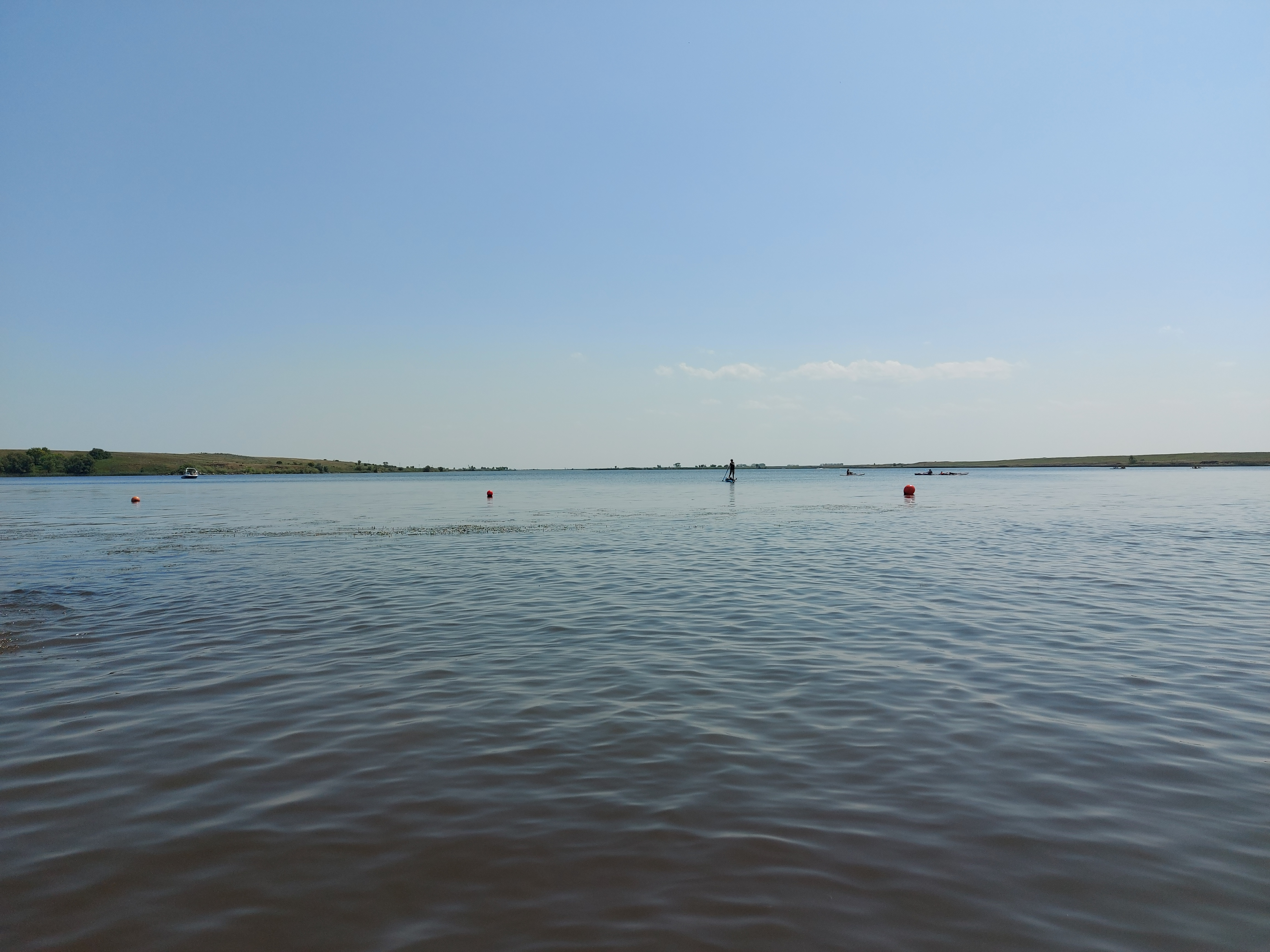
- Nickle Lake viewed from Nickle Lake Regional Park

- Location in Saskatchewan Nickle Lake (Canada)
- Location: RM of Weyburn No. 67, Saskatchewan
- Coordinates: 49.5832°N 103.7779°W
- Type: Reservoir
- Part of: Red River drainage basin
- Primary inflows: Souris River
- Primary outflows: Souris River
- Basin countries: Canada
- Max. length: 8 km (5.0 mi)
- Surface area: 421.6 ha (1,042 acres)
- Max. depth: 5.4 m (18 ft)
- Shore length^{1}: 32.6 km (20.3 mi)
- Surface elevation: 471 m (1,545 ft)
- Settlements: None
- ^{1} Shore length is not a well-defined measure.

Nickle Lake is a man-made reservoir in the Canadian province of Saskatchewan. It was created with the construction of a dam across the Souris River in the 1950s to supply water to the city of Weyburn. In the 1980s, the dam — named Albert Douglas Dam — was expanded increasing the size of the lake.

The two main inflows for Nickle Lake are the Souris River and Rinfret Brook, which enter the lake at the northern end. The Souris River exits the south end at Albert Douglas Dam. On the eastern shore is Nickle Lake Regional Park, which is about 11 kilometres (6.8 mi) south-east of Weyburn. There are no communities along the lake's shore and access is from Highway 39.

The Albert Douglas Dam (49.5645°N 103.7517°W), which impounds Nickle Lake, was completed on 1 August 1984. It was built to ensure a stable and reliable source of water for Weyburn as the city grew and to expand Nickle Lake for recreational purposes. It was named after Albert Douglas, who was the first person born in Briercrest, Saskatchewan, a local farmer, and a Member of Parliament for the Assiniboia riding from 1969 to 1971.

== Nickle Lake Regional Park ==
Nickle Lake Regional Park (49.5953°N 103.7781°W) is located on the eastern shore of Nickle Lake. Nickle Lake Park was founded in 1955 and became a regional park in 1964. The park has a campground, sandy beach, picnic area, mini golf, and two boat launches for lake access. The campground has about 350 campsites.

== Fish species ==
Fish commonly found in Nickle Lake include walleye, perch, northern pike, and burbot. The lake was last stocked with 22,000 walleye fingerlings in 2022.

== See also ==
- List of lakes of Saskatchewan
- List of protected areas of Saskatchewan
- List of dams and reservoirs in Canada
- Tourism in Saskatchewan
