= Wildcat Hill Provincial Park =

Provincial park in Saskatchewan, Canada

- IUCN category Ib (wilderness area)
- Location within Saskatchewan Location within Canada
- Location: Northern Administration District, Saskatchewan
- Nearest city: Hudson Bay, Saskatchewan
- Coordinates: 53°15′58″N 102°29′59″W
- Area: 21,752 ha (53,750 acres)
- Governing body: Sask Parks

Wildcat Hill Provincial Park is a wilderness provincial park in eastern Saskatchewan, Canada, approximately 40 kilometres (25 mi) from the town of Hudson Bay. It is located amongst the Pasquia Hills, south of Highway 55, and west of Highway 9. The 21,752-hectare park was established as a protected area in 1971, and became a provincial park in 1992.

The main attractions of Wildcat Hill Provincial Park are hunting and snowmobiling. The snowmobile trails in the park are part of a 684.14-km network of trails maintained by the Hudson Bay Trail Riders. In addition to the groomed trails, there are also many kilometres of unmaintained trails.

Moose, white-tailed deer, wolves, american black bear, coyotes, and cougar are commonly found inside the park. In addition to hunting, fishing can be done in the park at Bankside Lake, Firhead Lake, Fir River, and Pasquia River.

== Park access ==
While not accessible by car, the park is reachable by ATV or snowmobile.

== See also ==
- List of protected areas of Saskatchewan
- Tourism in Saskatchewan
