= Fort à la Corne Provincial Forest =

Protected forest in Saskatchewan, Canada

- Location within Saskatchewan Location within Canada
- Interactive map of Fort à la Corne Provincial Forest

Geography
- Location: Saskatchewan, Canada
- Coordinates: 53.163°N 104.866°W

The Fort à la Corne Provincial Forest is a mixed-wood forest conservation area in Saskatchewan, Canada. It is east of the city of Prince Albert and just north of the James Smith First Nation. The fort takes its name for a historic Hudson's Bay Company post in the area (see Fort à la Corne for more details). Recently the area has been subject to diamond exploration by various companies including Shane Resources, United Uranium, Shore Gold and most recently Rio Tinto.

== See also ==
- List of Saskatchewan provincial forests
