= Pasquia Hills =

Hilly plateau in Saskatchewan, Canada

- Location within Saskatchewan Location within Canada

Highest point
- Elevation: 785 m (2,575 ft)
- Prominence: 301 m (988 ft)
- Coordinates: 53°7′52″N 102°44′36″W

Geography
- Location: RM of Hudson Bay No. 394, Saskatchewan, Canada
- Parent range: Manitoba Escarpment

Pasquia Hills are hills in the Canadian province of Saskatchewan. They are located in the east central part of the province in the RM of Hudson Bay No. 394 near the Manitoba border. The hills are the northern most in a series of hills called the Manitoba Escarpment. The Manitoba Escarpment marks the western edge of the pre-historical glacial Lake Agassiz. The other four hills include Porcupine Hills, Duck Mountain, and Riding Mountain.

There are three main watersheds that flow from Pasquia Hills, all of which are part of the Hudson Bay drainage basin. The rivers originating from the north side flow into the Saskatchewan River. From the eastern slopes, the Pasquia River flows east into Manitoba and meets the Saskatchewan River at The Pas. The Overflowing River starts at Overflow Lake on the eastern side of the hills and travels east into Manitoba where it flows into Overflow Bay on Lake Winnipegosis. On the south side, the rivers drain south into the Red Deer River, which flows into Dawson Bay of Lake Winnipegosis.

== Parks and recreation ==
There are several parks and protected areas on the Pasquia Hills, including a provincial park, recreation sites, and regional parks. At the heart of the hills is Wildcat Hill Provincial Park, which is a wilderness park with no services that covers 22,000 ha (54,000 acres). Wildcat Hill (53.2995°N 102.4836°W), at 784 metres (2,572 ft) above sea level, is near the centre of the provincial park.

Other parks in the Pasquia Hills include:

- Rice River Canyon Ecological Reserve (53.5161°N 102.4059°W) is situated on the northern slopes of the Pasquia Hills and is centred around the Rice River Canyon. Over the last 12,000 years, the Rice River carved out the canyon, which has walls that reach almost 400 feet above the riverbed. At the bridge across Rice River on Highway 55, about 94 kilometres (58 mi) east of Carrot River, is the trail head for the Rice River Canyon hiking trail. It is a 10.6-kilometre (6.6 mi) "rugged backcountry wilderness hike" along the river up to the river forks.
- Pasquia Hills North Recreation Site (53.5379°N 102.3475°W) is a small, rustic campground on the northern slopes of the Pasquia Hills. Access is from Highway 55.
- Mountain Cabin Recreation Site (53.5838°N 102.1245°W) is a free campground at the intersection of Highways 9 and 55.
- Pasquia Regional Park (53.1889°N 103.5796°W) is a park on the Carrot River.
- Pasquia River Recreation Site (53.2552°N 102.1144°W)
- Overflowing River Recreation Site (53.0332°N 102.3151°W)
- Fir River Road Recreation Site (53.0821°N 102.6653°W)
- Ruby Lake Recreation Site (52.9600°N 102.3491°W) is a campground on Ruby Lake and is part of Hudson Bay Regional Park.
- Waskwei River Protected Area (53.4202°N 102.0526°W)

== Pasquia Provincial Forest ==
The Pasquia Provincial Forest is the forest that encompasses the Pasquia Hills and it is part of the Northern Boreal Forest in a sub region called Mid-Boreal Upland. It is one of several provincial forests in Saskatchewan. Recreation and logging are very important industries in the region. The forests of Wildcat Hill Provincial Park were originally protected in 1971 as a forest reserve and in 1992, it became a provincial park.

The trees of the Pasquia forest are typical of the Mid-Boreal Upland consisting of mixed coniferous and deciduous. The trees are medium to tall, closed stands of trembling aspen and balsam poplar, white and black spruce, and balsam fir. There are 21 different orchid species in the forest, including the rare ram's head lady slipper.

Wildlife in and around the forest include elk, white tail deer, moose, bears, muskrats, beavers, woodland caribou, and cougars. There are over 350 bird species in the forest.

== See also ==
- List of protected areas of Saskatchewan
- Porcupine Provincial Forest
- List of Saskatchewan provincial forests
- List of mountains of Saskatchewan
- Geography of Saskatchewan
- Pasquiaornis
