= Rural Municipality of Kutawa No. 278 =

Former rural municipality in Saskatchewan, Canada

Coordinates: 51°25′00″N 104°20′02″W

The Rural Municipality of Kutawa No. 278 (2006 Population 221) was a rural municipality (RM) in the Canadian province of Saskatchewan. It was dissolved on January 1, 2004.

== Geography ==
=== Communities and localities ===
Before getting absorbed by the RM of Mount Hope in January 2004, these are the following urban municipalities that were surrounded by the former RM.

Towns

- Raymore

Villages

- Punnichy
- Quinton

The following unincorporated communities are within the RM.

Localities

- Kutawa

== Demographics ==
Canada census – Rural Municipality of Kutawa No. 278 community profile

Population
Land area
Population density
Median age
Private dwellings
Median household income
