= Wakamow Valley Authority =

The Wakamow Valley Authority is a conservation organization created by the Provincial Government of Saskatchewan in Canada, and dedicated to conserving the cultural and natural resources of the Wakamow Valley. The Authority's activities include education, development and conservation. The Authority may also appoint special constables to exercise some of its responsibilities and provide peacekeeping within the Wakamow Valley, which includes parts of the city of Moose Jaw.

The facilities operated by the Authority include:

- Sportsman's Centre, a 200-seat historic hall
- Kiwanis River Park Pavilion and Kiwanis River Park Lodge
- Valley trails, Trans Canada Trail and parkland
- Lorne Calvert Campground - Oldest running campground in North America, since 1927
