= Overflowing River =

River in Western Canada

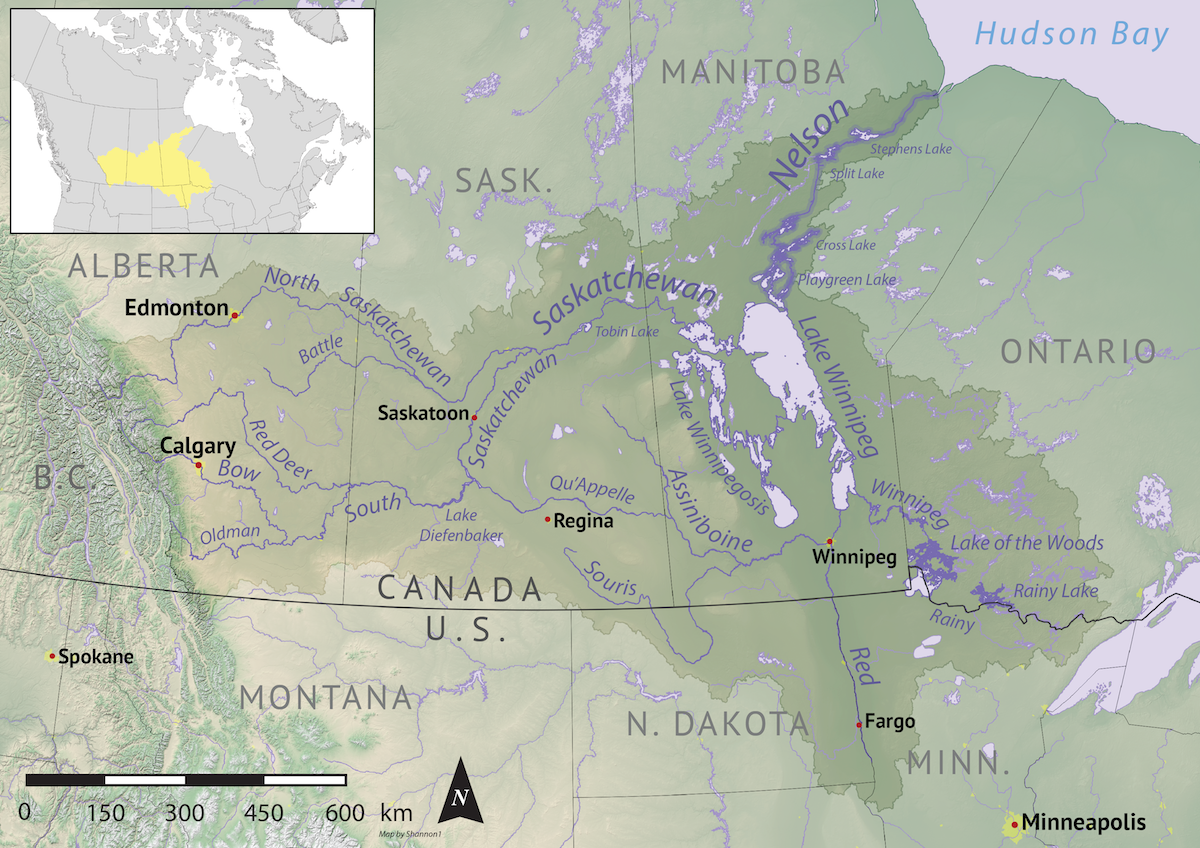
- Map of the Nelson River drainage basin

- Location of river's mouth in Manitoba Overflowing River (Canada)

Location
- Country: Canada
- Provinces: Manitoba; Saskatchewan

Physical characteristics
- Source: Overflow Lake
  - location: RM of Hudson Bay No. 394, Saskatchewan
  - coordinates: 53.1479°N 102.4832°W
  - elevation: 637 m (2,090 ft)
- Mouth: Overflowing Bay, Lake Winnipegosis
  - location: Overflowing River Sapotaweyak Cree Nation Indian Reserve, Northern Manitoba
  - coordinates: 53.1301°N 101.0836°W
  - elevation: 254 m (833 ft)

Basin features
- River system: Nelson River
- Tributaries
  - left: Leaf River; Ceba Creek; Chemong Creek; Rat Creek
  - right: Teepee Creek; Senton River
- Waterbodies: Leaf Lake

Overflowing River is a river in the Canadian provinces of Manitoba and Saskatchewan. It begins in Saskatchewan at Overflow Lake in the Pasquia Provincial Forest and flows in a generally eastward direction into Manitoba and then Lake Winnipegosis. The river traverses boreal forests and muskeg in the Boreal Plains Ecozone, moving from the Mid-Boreal Upland of the Pasquia Hills east to the Mid-Boreal Lowland.

== Course ==
Overflowing River begins at the south end of Overflow Lake in the Pasquia Hills, just south of the southern boundary of Wildcat Hill Provincial Park. The river flows south out of the hills towards the town Hudson Bay, where it is met by Teepee Creek. Upstream along Teepee Creek is the Tee-Pee Creek Dam. The dam is 3 metres (9.8 ft) high and contains a reservoir with a volume of 270 dam^{3} (220 acre⋅ft). It was built in 1950 and is owned and operated by the Saskatchewan Water Security Agency.

From Teepee Creek, Overflowing River carries on and crosses Highway 9 and then turns east. A small provincial ecological reserve called Overflowing River Recreation Site is at the intersection of the river and Highway 9. From Highway 9 eastward, Overflowing River parallels the Red Deer River as it flows towards Manitoba. Once in Manitoba, Overflowing River continues eastward and then empties into Overflowing Bay at Lake Winnipegosis. At the river's mouth is the small community of Overflowing River, Overflowing River Provincial Park, and Overflowing River Sapotaweyak Cree Nation Indian reserve.

== Tributaries ==
The tributaries of Overflowing River from its headwaters to its mouth:

- Teepee Creek
- Leaf River
- Ceba Creek
  - Berdahl Creek
- Chemong Creek
  - North Chemong Creek
- Rat Creek
- Senton River

== Fish species ==
Fish commonly found in Overflowing River include walleye, northern pike, yellow perch, freshwater drum, common carp, and brown bullhead. Overflowing River Provincial Park, which is accessed from Manitoba's Highway 10, provides access to the river for fishing.

== See also ==
- List of rivers of Saskatchewan
- List of rivers of Manitoba
- Hudson Bay drainage basin
