= Pasquia River =

River in Western Canada

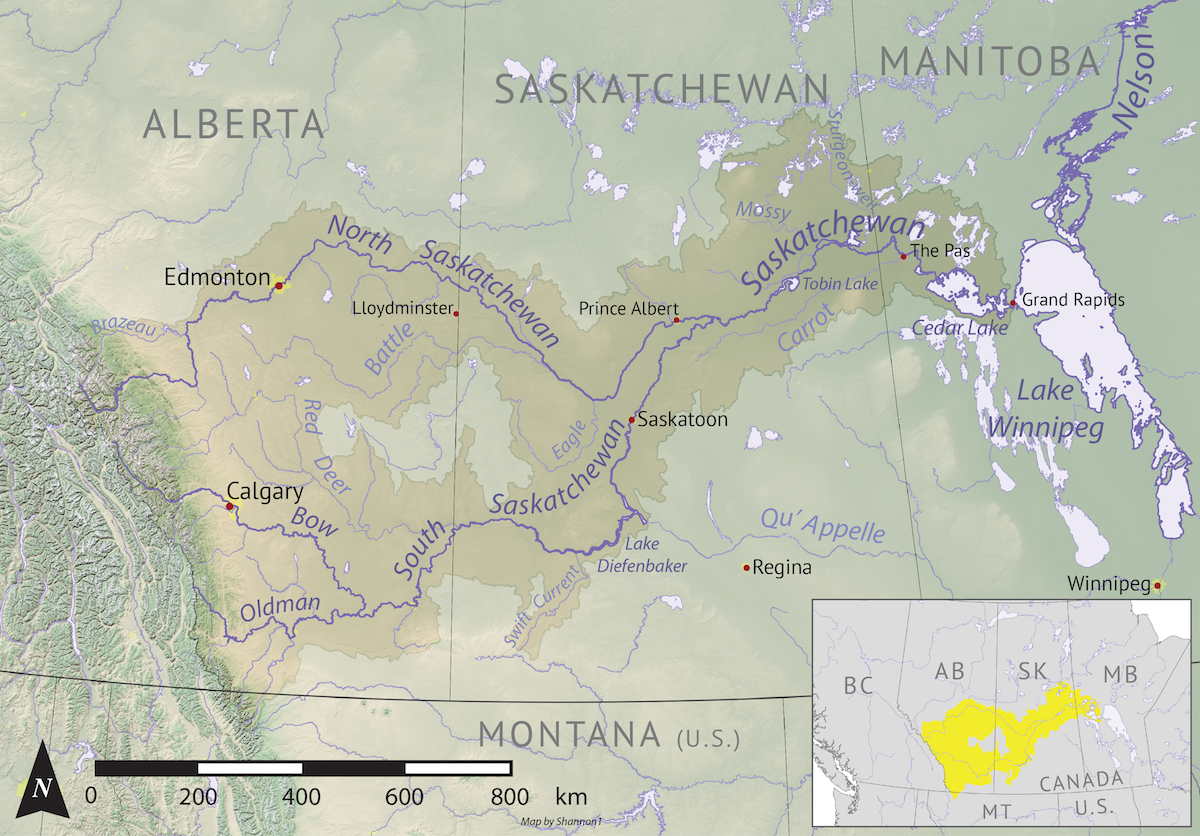
- Map of the Saskatchewan River drainage basin

- Location of river's mouth in Manitoba Pasquia River (Canada)

Location
- Country: Canada
- Provinces: Manitoba; Saskatchewan

Physical characteristics
- Source: Pasquia Hills
  - location: RM of Hudson Bay No. 394, Saskatchewan
  - coordinates: 53.2539°N 102.3836°W
- Mouth: Saskatchewan River
  - location: The Pas, Manitoba
  - coordinates: 53.5703°N 101.7443°W
  - elevation: 271 m (889 ft)
- Basin size: 830 km^{2} (320 sq mi)

Basin features
- River system: Nelson River
- Tributaries
  - left: Waskwei River
- Waterbodies: Nosamwokwu Lake; Askandigan Lake

Pasquia River is a river in the Canadian provinces of Manitoba and Saskatchewan. It begins in Saskatchewan in the Pasquia Hills and traverses boreal forests and muskeg in the Boreal Plains Ecozone, moving from the Mid-Boreal Upland of the Pasquia Hills east to the Mid-Boreal Lowland. It meets the Saskatchewan River in Manitoba at The Pas. Near the river's mouth, several small dams, dykes, and other water control structures have been built to control water flows.

== Description ==
Pasquia River begins at a small lake in the Rural Municipality of Hudson Bay No. 394 at the eastern boundary of Wildcat Hill Provincial Park in the Pasquia Hills. Coming out of the hills, it crosses Highway 9 and flows in an easterly direction towards the Manitoba border. At the Highway 9 bridge, there is a picnic area and access to the river from the Pasquia River Recreation Site (53.2552°N 102.1144°W). As the river nears the border with Manitoba, it begins to flow north paralleling it. At Nosamwokwu Lake, the river turns east and meets the Saskatchewan River at The Pas, just downstream from Carrot River.

In 1941, the Pasquia River Control Structure (Knapp Dam) was built by Ducks Unlimited Canada to control the waters from Pasquia Lake and improve conditions for waterfoul. Big Lake (which naturally drains into the Carrot River) was developed to store water during spring runoff. It releases water into Pasquia Lake then Pasquia River. The Kapp Dam also works to hold back water from the Saskatchewan River. Other diversions, dykes, and water control structures were built near the mouth in 1954 and 1960.

== Fish species ==
Fish commonly found in Pasquia River include walleye, burbot, lake sturgeon, and northern pike.

== See also ==
- List of rivers of Saskatchewan
- List of rivers of Manitoba
- List of dams in Manitoba
- Hudson Bay drainage basin
